= Korean People's Army State Merited Chorus and Symphony Orchestra =

North Korean musical ensemble

- Official army patch of the group

Background information
- Origin: North Korea
- Genres: Classical, hymns, opera, revolutionary, folk and traditional music, popular music (North Korean)
- Years active: 1947-present
- Labels: Kwangmyong Music Company, Mokran Video

Korean name
- Hangul: 조선인민군공훈국가합창단
- Hanja: 朝鮮人民軍功勳國家合唱團
- RR: Joseon inmingun gonghun gukga hapchangdan
- MR: Chosŏn inmin'gun konghun kukka hapch'angdan

The State Merited Chorus and Symphony Orchestra of the Korean People's Army (Korean: 조선인민군공훈국가합창단) is the principal musical performing unit of the Korean People's Army (KPA), based in the North Korean capital city of Pyongyang. As the second oldest military chorus and instrumental ensemble (after the Song and Dance Ensemble of the Korean People's Army), it serves as one of the outstanding premier musical ensembles within the whole KPA proper and has been hailed as a model institution. It has been in existence since February 1947.

== Brief history ==
The ensemble was established on February 25, 1947 by orders of the founding Premier of the DPRK and Supreme Commander of the KPA, Kim Il Sung, as a subdivision of the General Political Bureau of the KPA's arts and culture section, and performed its first public concert on that day, which has been marked as its anniversary ever since.

The SMCSO-KPA has been one of the more experienced of the military arts ensembles of North Korea, having made appearances in many events concerning the KPA, the Workers' Party of Korea (WPK) and the nation at large. During the Korean War, musicians and singers of the Chorus performed at the front lines before servicemen and women of the KPA, and many were decorated with state orders and decorations for valorous participation in the war effort. Postwar, it became one of the premier musical ensembles of the growing nation, and attention was given to its performances that featured songs praising the leadership of the country and helped in the propagation of the cult of personality of the state, the importance of Juche, economic progress and of national defense against the United States and its allies, and the building of a socialist future for the country and the world. Through its seven decades of existence the Chorus was also privileged to perform before many foreign heads of state and government in their state visits to the country.

In the mid-1990s up to his death in 2011, Kim Jong Il, in his capacity as Supreme Commander, attended many of its holiday and special concerts and made the Chorus a model musical group as part of the campaigns to strengthen the Songun ideology of the KPA and as an ambassador of North Korean music to the world. Many of his appearances in its concerts inspired the ensemble's musicians and singers to work harder to fulfill the tasks set by the Party and the KPA to provide the people with revolutionary-styled songs that portray the country as one that is strong, prosperous and independent, led by the Supreme Leaders, guided by the WPK in its pursuit of living the national ideology and defended to the last by the men and women of the People's Army, the armed forces guided by the Songun political ideology. Also, the Chorus made music videos shown daily on Korean Central Television of many of its best compositions, with the rise of pro-DPRK channels on social media sites like YouTube in the mid-2000s, the videos of their songs exposed the men of the ensemble and its symphonic orchestra to online viewers outside the country (except in South Korea, where such videos have been banned). In the late 2000s the Chorus began its series of collaboration concerts then with the now defunct Unhasu Orchestra, the Samjiyon Band and Orchestra, and the State Symphony Orchestra, in an effort to update its musical selections, in 2013 it continued on its collaboration concerts, this time, with the Moranbong Band and the Chongbong Band, alongside the Symphony Orchestra of the State Affairs Commission, appearing occasionally.

Kim Jong Un's administration saw the modernization of the ensemble and of its instrumentation to keep up with the times and formally included women soloists and instrumentalists beginning in 2014 as it transitioned into a dynamic musical group and the KPA's flagship ensemble, adopting pop-styled music in addition to its usual classical, ideological and patriotic music compositions performed in its concert schedules, some of which he attended personally in his capacity as Supreme Leader of the Republic and Supreme Commander of the KPA. However, despite these modernization efforts, the State Merited Chorus (SMC) initially faced difficulties adapting to the new performance style. During the 4th Congress of the Workers’ Party of Korea in 2013, the chorus performed jointly with the Moranbong Band under the direction of conductor Jang Ryong-sik, an occasion that highlighted these challenges. In subsequent joint performances with the Moranbong Band, the SMC gradually showed improvement and greater coordination. Over time, however, certain performances increasingly favored arrangements without orchestral collaboration. To mark the 70th year of the WPK in 2015, the Chorus, as part of the "Songs Full of Memories" concert series (February–March), also performed with musicians from both the Pochonbo Electronic Ensemble and the Wangjaesan Light Music Band. In 2019, it gained a permanent home at the WPK Central Committee Annex Building in Pyongyang, following years of performing in major concert halls in the capital, using a new set of white dress uniforms (debuted 2018), which are used occasionally with the new styled khaki uniforms, used since 2015 in concert performances.

It began performing overseas after many years in September 2015, when it performed in Moscow to mark the 70th anniversary of the Allied victory in the Pacific, followed by an impressive performance in January 2019, when it performed at the National Concert Hall in Beijing, China.

On June 21, 2019, the Chorus and Symphony Orchestra played in the formal reopening night of the 2019 Arirang Mass Games "People's Country" at Pyongyang's Rungrado 1st of May Stadium in the presence of both Kim Jong Un and the General Secretary of the Chinese Communist Party, Xi Jinping.

In 2018, the State Merited Chorus (SMC) presented the New Year’s performance jointly with the Moranbong Band, an event widely regarded as their final collaboration with a full orchestra. In 2022, the SMC participated in joint performances with the Band of the State Affairs Commission. Reports indicated that Kim Jong-un was in attendance; however, he was not shown in the official broadcast footage, leading to speculation that Kim Kyong-hui was present, despite earlier rumors regarding her death. From 2023 to 2025, performances were conducted exclusively by the State Merited Chorus, with no orchestral collaboration.

During the 74th Founding Anniversary of the Democratic People’s Republic of Korea on September 9, 2022, the SMC performed numerous pieces in collaboration with the Pyongyang State Orchestra, with conductor Jang Ryong-sik leading the finale. This event is believed to have marked his final appearance as conductor. The following year, during the 75th anniversary celebrations, performances were jointly presented with the Samjiyon Band.

In contrast, during the 76th anniversary celebrations, the SMC appeared only briefly and performed independently, without collaboration with another major ensemble. This appearance was not broadcast on state television; however, short performance clips were later identified in several videos uploaded online, primarily from Chinese sources.

On 10 October 2025, the State Merited Chorus, together with the Samjiyon Band and the Pyongyang State Orchestra, performed at Pyongyang’s Rungrado 1st of May Stadium in commemoration of the 80th Anniversary of the Workers’ Party of Korea. The event was attended by Kim Jong-un and various foreign officials. Hence the theme, "Long Live the Workers' Party of Korea".

== See also ==
- Music of North Korea
- Republic of Korea Army Band

== Conductors ==
- Recent Conductors
  - Kim Chung-il: (2012 - onwards)
  - Heo Myeong-gwon: (2022 - onwards)
- Former Conductors
  - Jang Ryong-sik: (Chief Conductor: 2013 - 2022)
  - Yoon Beom-ju: (2013)
  - Kim Ho-Yun: (2022 - 2025)
  - Ryu Hyon-o: (2012 - 2019)
  - Sung Seong-il
  - Kim Kwang-hun
  - Ri Il-chan
