= Kim Ok Ju =

North Korean singer

Kim Ok Ju 김옥주 People's Artiste
- Genres: Pop music; Folk music
- Occupation: Singer
- Years active: 2008–present
- Member of: Band of the State Affairs Commission
- Formerly of: Wanjaesan Band; Unhasu Orchestra; Moranbong Ensemble; Moranbong Band; Chongbong Band; Samjiyon Orchestra

Kim Ok Ju (Korean: 김옥주) is a North Korean singer. She is currently a singer for the Band of the State Affairs Commission but does solo work also. She was previously a part of the famed pop group Moranbong Band. She has performed at major concerts attended by several world leaders, including Moon Jae-in, Xi Jinping, Vladimir Putin, Tô Lâm, Alexander Lukashenko.

== Early career ==
Kim progressed her career part of the "Moranbong Quartet" singing with Wangjaesan Band and Pochonbo Electronic Ensemble. Her career kicked off more with the Unhasu Orchestra singing many songs solo but also singing songs with the wider Moranbong Ensemble sextet. After the Unhasu Orchestra disbanded in 2013, she appeared in the newly formed Chongbong Band in 2015. From 2017, she was moved from the Chongbong Band to the Moranbong Band where she wore a military uniform of a Major which is the second highest within the band after Lieutenant Colonel, she was described as the vocal manager of the Moranbong Band. She appeared once at a Samjiyon Orchestra concert on the 31st December 2019.

== In recent years ==
Kim Ok Ju joined the Band of the State Affairs Commission following its formation in 2020, since joining the band she has sung and starred in a series of state media music videos and as well starred in a multitude of concerts watched by Kim Jong Un.

In 2021, she was awarded the title of "People's Artiste" at an award ceremony in the Mansudae Assembly Hall, according to state media it was awarded because the band "distinguished themselves in creative activities for ushering in a new period of efflorescence of socialist literature and arts, true to the important tasks set forth at the 8th Congress of the Workers' Party of Korea"

She has performed several Russian songs at the concerts on the occasions of visits of various Russian delegations, including Vladimir Putin. She was lauded for her perfect Russian and excellent vocals.

In 2025 she performed at the concerts for KPA soldiers returning after deployment in Russia.

In 2026 she performed Belarusian songs at the concert on the occasion of the visit of the President of Belarus Alexander Lukashenko .
