= List of North Korean musicians =

This is a list of musical artists that are of North Korean nationality.

== North Korean musicians ==
Titles and awards	Name	Korean name	Instrument	Famous works	Orchestra	Notes	Ref
Merited Artist	Kim Il Jin		Cello, conductor		Mansudae Art Troupe, Isang Yun Orchestra	Married to film actress Kim Yong Suk.	
	Kim Yong Jae	김용재	Vocals, piano		Unhasu Orchestra		
	Kim Jong Nyo	김정녀	Vocals	Ours is a Family of Soldiers, Arirang of Prosperity	Pochonbo Electronic Ensemble, Wangjaesan Light Music Band		
Merited Actress	Jo Kum Hwa	조금화	Vocals	Wild Geese Flying in the Sky, Campfire, I Can't Tell	Pochonbo Electronic Ensemble	Only alto in the Pochonbo Electronic Ensemble.	
People's Actress	Jon Hye Yong	전혜영	Vocals	Whistle, Cuckoo	Pochonbo Electronic Ensemble		
	Yun Hye Yong	윤혜영	Vocals	This is an Attack, Stars Whispering One, Two, Three	Pochonbo Electronic Ensemble, Wangjaesan Light Music Band		
Merited Actress	Ryu Jin A	류진아	Vocals		Moranbong Band	Lead singer of the Moranbong Band after succeeding to Kim Kyong Hui.	
People's Artist	Mun Kyong Jin	문경진	Violin		Unhasu Orchestra, Mansudae Art Troupe	Foreign-educated concertmaster of the Unhasu Orchestra.	
Merited Actress	Ri Kyong Suk	리경숙	Vocals	Glad to Meet You, My Country is the Best, Don't Ask My Name	Pochonbo Electronic Ensemble	Married to bassist Kim Yong Il.	
Merited Actress	Ri Ok Hwa	리옥화	Vocals		Moranbong Band, Moranbong Chorus		
Merited Actress	Ri Pun Hui	리분희	Vocals	Don't Advance Night of Pyongyang, The Voice Calling Me	Pochonbo Electronic Ensemble		
	Ri Sol Ju	리설주	Vocals	Burn High, Campfire!	Unhasu Orchestra, Moranbong Chorus, Wangjaesan Light Music Band	Current first lady of North Korea.	
Merited Actress	Hyon Song Wol	현송월	Vocals	A Girl in the Saddle of a Steed, Without a Break!	Pochonbo Electronic Ensemble, Wangjaesan Light Music Band, Unhasu Orchestra, Samjiyon Orchestra, Moranbong Band	One of North Korea's most powerful women, close to leader Kim Jong Un. Director of the Moranbong Band.	
Merited Actress	Ra Yu Mi	라유미	Vocals		Moranbong Band		
People's Actress	Kim Kwang Suk	김광숙	Vocals	The Dear Name, Mother's Song, Where are You, Dear General?	Pochonbo Electronic Ensemble	Died in 2018 due to a Heart Attack. Married to Jon Kwon.	
People's Actor	Kim Won Il	김원일	Synthesizers		Pochonbo Electronic Ensemble	Removed from footage in 2009, probably purged.	
Merited Actor	Kim Hae Song	김해성	Synthesizers		Pochonbo Electronic Ensemble		
Merited Actor	Kim Mun Hyok	김문혁	Synthesizers		Pochonbo Electronic Ensemble		
	Kwon Kyong Hak	권경학	Synthesizers		Pochonbo Electronic Ensemble		
	Kim Song Ryop	김성렵	Synthesizers		Pochonbo Electronic Ensemble		
People's Artist	Jon Kwon	전권	Piano		Pochonbo Electronic Ensemble, Wangjaesan Light Music Band	Also arranged foreign music for the Pochonbo Electronic Ensemble.	
	Jang Jong Won	장정원	Piano		Pochonbo Electronic Ensemble		
	Ri Mun	리문	Electronic Organ		Pochonbo Electronic Ensemble		
Merited Actor	Kang Chol Ho	강철호	Electronic Organ		Pochonbo Electronic Ensemble		
	Kang Kum Chol	강금철	Electronic Organ		Pochonbo Electronic Ensemble		
	Pak Ui Hyon	박의현	Electric Guitar		Pochonbo Electronic Ensemble		
Merited Actor	Song Kwang	송광	Electric Guitar		Pochonbo Electronic Ensemble		
Merited Actor	Choe Yong Chol	최영철	Electric Guitar		Pochonbo Electronic Ensemble		
	Kim Yong Il	김영일	Bass Guitar		Pochonbo Electronic Ensemble	Married to vocalist Ri Kyong Suk.	
Merited Actor	Choe Mun Chol	최문철	Drums		Pochonbo Electronic Ensemble		
Merited Actor	Kim Jin	김진	Percussions, vocals	My Love, My Happiness	Pochonbo Electronic Ensemble	Served often as the only male vocalist in the Pochonbo Electronic Ensemble, besides Kim Hae Song. Possibly deceased or retired.	
Merited Artist	Kim Yon Su	김연수	Conductor		Pochonbo Electronic Ensemble, Korean People's Army Song and Dance Ensemble		
Labour Hero, People's Artist	Ri Jong O	리종오	Conductor, concert flute		Pochonbo Electronic Ensemble, Mansudae Art Troupe	Main conductor and leader of the Pochonbo Electronic Ensemble. Died in 2016.	
People's Actress	Choe Sam Suk	최삼숙	Vocals	I Shall be a Flower Harbinger of Spring, I Know it Now	Korean Radio and Film Music Orchestra, Mansudae Art Troupe	Major film song vocalist, with hundreds of titles featuring her voice.	
People's Actor	Kim Sung Yon	김승연	Vocals	Song of Comradeship	Korean Radio and Film Music Orchestra, Mansudae Art Troupe	Major film song vocalist	
	Ri In Suk	리인숙	Vocals				
	Mo Yong Il	모영일	Vocals				
	Kim Hyok	김혁	Guitar			Not to be confused with composer Kim Hyok.	
Merited Actress	Pak Bok Hui	박복희	Vocals		Wangjaesan Light Music Band		
	Jang Yun Hui	장윤희	Vocals		Wangjaesan Light Music Band		
	Kim Hwa Suk	김화숙	Vocals		Wangjaesan Light Music Band		
	Ko Kyong Ran	고경란	Vocals		Wangjaesan Light Music Band		
Merited Actor	Pak Chol Jun	박철준	Trumpet	I Look at You and Think	Wangjaesan Light Music Band		
	Jang Mu Kil	장무길	Brass		Wangjaesan Light Music Band		
	Ryom Tong Son	렴덩성	Vocals		Wangjaesan Light Music Band		
	Pak In Tae	박인대	Trumpet		Wangjaesan Light Music Band		
People's Actress	Ryom Chong	렴청	Vocals	Thunder on Jong Il Peak, Let's Love Our Motherland	Wangjaesan Light Music Band	Lead singer of the Wangjaesan Light Music Band.	
	Kim Son Hui	김선희	Vocals		Wangjaesan Light Music Band		
	Choe Kwang Ho	최광호	Vocals		Wangjaesan Light Music Band		
	Ko Hwa Son	고화선	Guitar		Wangjaesan Light Music Band		
	Jon Il	전일	Violin	Thoughts on the Love, Thank You	Wangjaesan Light Music Band	Performed many electric violin solos.	
	O Jong Yun	오정윤	Vocals	White Frost Flower, Maple Leaves Turn Red	Wangjaesan Light Music Band		
	Hwang Suk Kyong	황숙경	Vocals		Wangjaesan Light Music Band		
	Kim Myong Ok	김명옥	Vocals		Wangjaesan Light Music Band		
	Pak Man Chol	박만철	Saxophone		Wangjaesan Light Music Band		
	Paek Jong Suk	백정숙	Vocals				
	Ri Ok Hui	리옥희	Vocals				
	An Hwa Bok	안화복	Vocals		Korean Radio and Film Music Orchestra		
	Ri Kyong Hwa	리경화	Vocals		Korean Radio and Film Music Orchestra		
Merited Actress	Jang Un Ae	장은애	Vocals	Flower in My Heart	Korean Radio and Film Music Orchestra		
	Jo Hye Kyong	조혜경	Vocals				
	Ri Kyong Hun	리경훈	Vocals	My Love, My Happiness	Korean Radio and Film Music Orchestra	Often performed duets with Jang Un Ae and Choe Sam Suk.	
	Jang Ran Hui	장란희	Vocals				
	Kim Ri Ku	김리구	Vocals				
	Yun Ik Hyon	윤익현	Vocals				
	Choe Hi Thae	최히태	Saxophone				
	Kim Un Suk	김은숙	Vocals				
	U Sun Hui	우순희	Vocals				
	Kim Song Sim	김성심	Vocals	Prosperous Arirang	Moranbong Chorus, Chongbong Band, State Merited Chorus and Symphony Orchestra		
	Han Sol Hyang	한설향	Vocals		Wangjaesan Light Music Band, Moranbong Chorus		
	Ri Chun Il	리 춘 일	Vocals		Unhasu Orchestra, State Merited Chorus and Symphony Orchestra		
	Rim Chang Sil	림창실	Vocals				
Merited Actor	Kim Ki Yong	김기영	Vocals	Song of Comradeship	Unhasu Orchestra, State Merited Chorus and Symphony Orchestra	Father of Kim Kyong Ho	
	Kim Kyong Ho	김경호	Vocals		Unhasu Orchestra	Son of Kim Ki Yong	
	Ri Sang Su	리상수	Vocals	My Song in the Trench	State Merited Chorus and Symphony Orchestra		
People's Actress	Kim Ok Ju	김옥주	Vocals	The Dear Name	Moranbong Chorus, Moranbong Band, Chongbong Band, Samjiyon Band	Was personally awarded the title of People's Actress by Kim Jong Un.	
	Kim Kang Bong	김강봉	Vocals				
Merited Artist	Han Ki Chan	한기찬	Conductor		Band of the Mass Gymnastics Production Company	One of the conductors responsible for the music performed at the early Arirang Festivals.	
	Jo Ho Hyok	조호혁	Pianist		Wangjaesan Light Music Band		
	Ryu Chum Hya	류춤햐	Vocals	Where are You, Dear General?	Phibada Opera Troupe	Famously sang the solo Where are You, Dear General? in the opera A True Daughter of the Party.	
	Kim Yong Ran	김영란	Electric Guitar	My Warm Love Will Protect You, Are We Living Like in Those Days?	Pochonbo Electronic Ensemble, Wangjaesan Light Music Band		
	Kim Su Myong	김수명	Violin		Unhasu Orchestra, Chongbong Band	Deputy concertmaster of the Unhasu Orchestra.	
	Jong Son Yong	정선영	Violin		Unhasu Orchestra		
	Paek Hyon Hui	백현희	Violin		Unhasu Orchestra		
	Pae Un Ju	배은주	Violin		Unhasu Orchestra		
	Kim Song Hui	김송희	Violin		Unhasu Orchestra		
	Choe Song Il	최성일	Violin		Unhasu Orchestra		
	Kim Mun Sol	김문설	Violin		Unhasu Orchestra		
	Choe Jin Ok	최진옥	Cello		Unhasu Orchestra		
	Ri Kum Hyok	리금혁	Cello		Unhasu Orchestra		
	Yon Jin A	연진아	Cello		Unhasu Orchestra		
	Ryang Chol Jun	량철준	Cello		Unhasu Orchestra		
	Kang Se Hyok	강세혁	Cello		Unhasu Orchestra, Kim Won Gyun Conservatory	Professor at the Kim Won Gyun Conservatory.	
	Nam Un Ha	남운하	Sohegum		Unhasu Orchestra		
	Jo Ok Ju	조옥주	Kayagum, Harp		Unhasu Orchestra		
	Ho Kwang Jin	허광진	Piano	Korea is One	Unhasu Orchestra		
	Kim Yong Mi	김영미	Piano		Unhasu Orchestra		
	Kim Jong Mi	김정미	Piano		Unhasu Orchestra, Chongbong Band		
	Song Un Sim	송은심	Guitar		Unhasu Orchestra		
	Ri Jong Hui	리정희	Concert flute		Unhasu Orchestra		
	Jin Guk Song	진국송	Wood flute, concert flute		Unhasu Orchestra		
	Jin Yong Su	전영수	Clarinet		Unhasu Orchestra		
	Ri Chol Hun	리철훈	Saxophone		Unhasu Orchestra		
	Song Yong Guk	송용국	Saxophone		Unhasu Orchestra		
	Kim Hyong Il	김형일	Saxophone		Unhasu Orchestra		
	Hwang Sung Chol	황승철	Saxophone, clarinet		Unhasu Orchestra, Chongbong Band		
	Ri Ung	리웅	Saxophone		Unhasu Orchestra		
	Kim Song Guk	김성국	Saxophone		Unhasu Orchestra		
	Ri Song Hwa	리성화	Saxophone				
	Im Hyang Ran	임향란	Saxophone				
	Ri Song Kyong	리성경	Saxophone				
	Kim Un Song	김운성	Trumpet		Unhasu Orchestra		
	Kim Song Il	김성일	Trumpet		Unhasu Orchestra		
	Kim Chol Jun	김철준	Trumpet		Unhasu Orchestra, Chongbong Band		
	Kim Un Chol	김은철	Senap		Unhasu Orchestra		
	Won Yun Jol	원윤절	Accordion		Unhasu Orchestra		
	Kim Hyang Sun	김향순	Accordion		Unhasu Orchestra, Moranbong Band, State Merited Chorus and Symphony Orchestra		
Merited Actress	Kim Yu Kyong	김유경	Vocals	Let's Love Our Lives with Burning Passion	Moranbong Band, State Merited Chorus	Performed in China with a delegation of North Korean artists.	
	Pak Kyong Ae	박경애	Vocals		Tongil Ensemble		
	Ri Yong Ae	리영애	Vocals		Tongil Ensemble		
	Ri Kum Hui	리금희	Vocals		Tongil Ensemble		
	Maeng Hyang Song	맹향성	Vocals		Tongil Ensemble		
	Pak Su Ryong	박수령	Vocals		Tongil Ensemble		
	Ma Sun Hui	마순희	Vocals		Tongil Ensemble		
	Cha Sun Mi	차순미	Vocals		Tongil Ensemble		
	Ri Un Hui	리은희	Drums		Tongil Ensemble		
	Pak Yun Hui	박윤희	Bass guitar		Tongil Ensemble		
	Kim Yong Su	김영수	Guitar		Tongil Ensemble		
	Jo Sung Kwon	조승권	Synthesizers		Tongil Ensemble		
	Pae Kum Chol	배금철	Synthesizers		Tongil Ensemble		
Merited Actor	Ri Song Chol	리성철	Vocals	Where are You, Dear General?	State Merited Chorus and Symphony Orchestra	Important tenor singer in the early to late 2000's.	
	Kim Myong Ho	김명호	Vocals	Our 7.27	State Merited Chorus and Symphony Orchestra		
People's Actor	Sok Ji Min	석지민	Vocals	Soldier's Footsteps, "Korea, I will Glorify You"	State Merited Chorus and Symphony Orchestra		
	Ho Kwang Il	허광일	Vocals	The Day When the General Came to Our Outpost	State Merited Chorus and Symphony Orchestra		
Merited Actor	Hong Kyong Hun	홍경훈	Vocals	My Motherland I Stand Guard	State Merited Chorus and Symphony Orchestra		
Merited Actress	Song Jong Sil	송정실	Vocals	Prosperous Arirang	State Merited Chorus and Symphony Orchestra		
Merited Actress	O Phil Oae	오필배	Violin		Mansudae Art Troupe		
Merited Actress	Kang Sin Hyok	강신혁	Violin		Mansudae Art Troupe		
Merited Actress	Ri Hye Kyong	리혜경	Cello		Mansudae Art Troupe		
Merited Actress	Choe Ryong Ju	최룡주	Flute		Mansudae Art Troupe		
Merited Actress	Ri Na Mi	리나미			Mansudae Art Troupe		
Merited Actress	Pak Chun Yong	박춘영			Mansudae Art Troupe		
Merited Actress	Kim Sae Ran	김새란	Violin		Mansudae Art Troupe		
Merited Actress	Kim Kum I	김금이	Cello		Mansudae Art Troupe		
Merited Actress	Ko Sin Yong	고신영	Violin		Mansudae Art Troupe		
Merited Actress	Kim Chang Yong	김창용	Violin		Mansudae Art Troupe		
Merited Actress	Ri Song Hui	리성희			Mansudae Art Troupe		
	Son Jong Ae	손정애			Mansudae Art Troupe		
2.16 Art Prize Winner	Ri Myong Hui	로명희	Clarinet		Mansudae Art Troupe		
2.16 Art Prize Winner Merited Actress	O Yong Ran	오영란	Cello		Mansudae Art Troupe		
Merited Actress	Kim Yong Hui	김영희	Violin		Mansudae Art Troupe		
Merited Actress	O Yong Suk	오영숙			Mansudae Art Troupe		
Merited Actress	Jang Jae Ok	장재옥	Percussions		Mansudae Art Troupe		
Merited Actor	Pak Kye Su	박계수	Vocals		Mansudae Art Troupe		
People's Actor Order of Korean Labour	Ju Chang Hyok	주창혁	Vocals		Mansudae Art Troupe		
Merited Actor	Pak Yong Sae	박영새	Vocals		Mansudae Art Troupe		
People's Actor	Ro Yong Kwon	로용권	Vocals		Mansudae Art Troupe		
Merited Actress	Paek Jong Sung	백정숭	Vocals		Phibada Opera Troupe		
	Choe Ok Suk	최옥숙	Vocals		Phibada Opera Troupe		
	Kim Mi Suk	김미숙	Vocals		Phibada Opera Troupe		
	Kim Won Ok	김원옥	Vocals		Phibada Opera Troupe		
Merited Actress	Kim Bong Hui	김봉희	Vocals		Phibada Opera Troupe		
Merited Actress	Choe Kum Hui	최금희	Vocals		Phibada Opera Troupe		
Merited Actress	Ri Chun Hwa	리춘화	Vocals		Phibada Opera Troupe		
Merited Actress	Paek Dok Hwa	백덕화	Vocals		Phibada Opera Troupe		
	Ri Yong Hui	리영희	Vocals		Phibada Opera Troupe		
	Ho Yon Ae	허영애	Vocals		Phibada Opera Troupe		
Merited Actress	Kim Hak Sun	김학순	Vocals		Phibada Opera Troupe		

== North Korean songwriters and composers ==
Titles and Awards	Name	Korean Name	Field	Famous Works	Orchestra	Notes	Ref
Hero of the DPRK	Ri In Mo	리인모	Songwriting	Lead By You We Will Win, Ode to Faith and Will, Thoughts on the Love		Unconverted long-term prisonner imprisoned in South Korea and repatriated in 1993. Died in 2007.	
	Ri Chi Son	리치선	Songwriting				
People's Artist	An Jong Ho	안정호	Composition	Thunder on Jong Il Peak, We Have Waited	Pochonbo Electronic Ensemble, Moranbong Band	Vice Director of the Creative Section of the Moranbong Band	
	Yun Du Kun	윤두군	Songwriting				
	Song Kwang Rim	성광림	Composition				
	Pak Wal Bin	박왈빈	Composition				
	Kim Hyok	김혁	Composition, Songwriting	We Have Nothing to Envy in this World, Spring Girl		Major composer of Kim Il Sung-era music.	
Merited Artist	Kang Kun Hong	강군홍	Composition		Band of the Mass Gymnastics Production Company	Composer and arranger of music for mass gymnastics displays.	
People's Artist	Jo Jae Son	조재선	Composition		Band of the Mass Gymnastics Production Company	Composer and arranger of music for mass gymnastics displays.	
People's Artist	Hwang Jin Yong	황진영	Composition	Without a Break, A Mountain Flower, Traces of Life	Pochonbo Electronic Ensemble, Moranbong Band, Korean Radio and Film Music Orchestra	Major composer of the Pochonbo Electronic Ensemble. Passed away on January 24, 2025.	
	U Jong Hui	우정희	Composition		Pochonbo Electronic Ensemble, Moranbong Band	Director of the Creative Section of the Moranbong Band	
	Song Kwang Rim	송광림	Composition	Always Longing for Him, My Country Has Many Heroes, My Dear Motherland	Mansudae Art Troupe, Phibada Opera Troupe	Volume 77 of the Mansudae Art Troupe's CD releases is dedicated to his compositions.	
Order of the National Flag	Pak Wal Bin	박왈빈	Composition	Immortal in the People's Minds, We Shall Go with the Party Forever		Volume 107 of the CD series 'Songs of Korea' is dedicated to his compositions. Pak also holds the rank of Senior Colonel in the KPA Ground Forces.	
	Kim Hae Song	김해성	Arrangement	We Shall Be Loyal Forever	Pochonbo Electronic Ensemble	Arranged classical pieces into electronic renditions.	
Merited Actor	Kim Mun Hak	김문학	Arrangement	Young Hearts Engraved in the Tideland	Pochonbo Electronic Ensemble		
People's Artiste	Ku Seung Hae	구승해	Arrangement	Yangsando, Ongheya, Peasant Music	Pochonbo Electronic Ensemble		
People's Artiste	Jang Ryong Sik	장령식	Arrangement	My Warm Love Will Protect You	Pochonbo Electronic Ensemble		

== Music bands, groups and orchestras ==
Name	Other Names	Korean Name	Main Genre	Status	Divisions	Notable Members	Notes	Ref
Central Military Band of the Korean People's Army	Korean People's Army Marching Band, DPRK Army Orchestra	조선인민군군악단	Military	Active	Women's Military Marching Band of the Ministry of People's Security of the DPRK			
Isang Yun Orchestra	Yun I Sang Orchestra	윤이상관현악단	Orchestral	Active		Kang Ryong Ung (Conductor), Kim Chol Ryong (concertmaster)	Rarely featured in North Korean media.	
Mansudae Art Troupe		만수대예술단	Varied (including orchestral and operatic music)	Active	Pochonbo Electronic Ensemble, Samjiyon Band, Mansudae Chorus			
Moranbong Band	Moranbong Electronic Ensemble, Moranbong Electronic Music Band, Moran Hill Orchestra	모란봉악단	Pop, fusion	Retired		Hyon Song Wol (director)		
Chongbong Band		청봉악단	Pop, light music	Retired			Overshadowed by the Moranbong Band, the Chongbong Band often performed in joint performances.	
Pochonbo Electronic Ensemble	Pochonbo Light Music Ensemble	보천보전자악단	Pop, trot	Retired	Moranbong Chorus	Kim Kwang Suk (vocalist), Jon Hye Yong (vocalist), Hyon Song Wol (vocalist)		
State Symphony Orchestra of the DPRK	National Symphony Orchestra	조선국립교향악단	Symphonic	Active		Kim Pyong Hwa (lead conductor), Choi Ki Hyok (concertmaster)	Recent Lead Conductor: Chae Ju Hyok, Pang Chol Jin, Ho Mu Yong	
Unhasu Orchestra		은하수관현악단	Pop, classical	Disbanded		Ri Myong Il (lead conductor, Mun Kyong Jin (concertmaster)		
Wangjaesan Art Troupe	Wangjaesan Light Music Band	왕재산예술단	Light music, pop, gymnastics music	Active	Wangjaesan Light Music Band, Wangjaesan Dance Troupe, Chongbong Band	Ryom Chong (lead vocalist), Hyon Song Wol (vocalist)	Renamed from 'Light Music Band' to 'Art Troupe' in 2009.	
Samjiyon Band	Samjiyon Orchestra	삼지연악단	Pop, classical	Active	Unnamed female song and dance group	Kim Ok Ju (vocalist), Han Hong Myong (vocalist)		
Band of the Mass Gymnastics Production Company			Mass gymnastics music	Unknown			Created by a need for live music during mass gymnastics performances. Such a need was replaced by speakers in the 2010 Arirang Festival.	
Band of the State Affairs Commission of the DPRK	Ensemble of the State Affairs Commission of the DPRK	국뮈위원회연주단	Pop, classical	Rarely active	Unnamed female song and dance group	Kim Ok Ju (vocalist), Kim Thae Ryong (vocalist)	Recently performed during the 83rd Birthday Celebratory Performance for the Great Leader Comrade Kim Jong Il on February 16, 2025, with conductors such as Pang Chol Jin and Ri Myong Il	

== See also ==
- List of South Korean musicians
- List of musicians
- Culture of North Korea
- Music of North Korea
- Korean music
