= We Will Go to Mount Paektu =

North Korean patriotic song performed by Moranbong Band

Song by Moranbong Band
- Language: Korean
- Released: 20 April 2015
- Genre: Light music
- Length: 4:03
- Composer: U Jong Hui
- Lyricist: Ri Ji Song

- We Will Go to Mount Paektu
- Hangul: 가리라 백두산으로
- RR: Garira Baekdusaneuro
- MR: Karira Paektusanŭro

"We Will Go to Mount Paektu" is a 2015 North Korean light music song in praise of the country's leader, Kim Jong Un.

The song is important politically, and its lyrics recount a highly symbolic trek onto Mount Paektu, important in North Korean propaganda, by Kim Jong Un.

The song is associated with the Moranbong Band but has been performed by other North Korean artists as well. Slovenian avant-garde group Laibach recorded an English-language cover version of the song and wanted to perform it in North Korea. Authorities of the country asked them to leave it out of their concert and the group complied.

== Background ==
Songs had played an important part in the cult of personality of Kim Jong-un, whose succession of Kim Jong Il was accompanied by the song "Footsteps". Likewise, the purge of Jang Song-thaek, a major political event in Kim Jong Un's early career, was accompanied by "We Will Follow You Only". The release of "We Will Go to Mount Paektu" in turn coincided with soon-to-be-purged Minister of People's Armed Forces Hyon Yong-chol's visit abroad in Moscow.

The lyrics of "We Will Go to Mount Paektu", by Ri Ji-song, were released in Rodong Sinmun on 20 April 2015. The lyrics recount Kim Jong Un's trek to Mount Paektu, important in North Korean propaganda and described as the "sacred mountain of the Sun that gives [the people] the spirit of victory" by the lyrics of the song. The text below is the chorus (or refrain) of the song.

가리라 가리라
백두산으로 가리라
우리를 부르는 백두산으로 가리라
가리라 가리라 백두산으로

We will go – We will go,
we will go to Paektusan.
It calls to us, Paektusan,
we will go – we will go – to Paektusan…

The song took the center stage in Moranbong Band's concert on 28 April 2015. The song became one of the biggest hits of 2015 in North Korea. Other North Korean groups that have performed the song are the State Merited Chorus and the Kim Il-sung Youth League Art Propaganda Squad.

== Laibach cover version ==
Slovenian avant-garde music group Laibach released an English-language cover version of the song. The band intended to play their version for a live audience in North Korea as part of their Liberation Day tour there, but North Korean officials censored them for having altered the song. Ivo Saliger of the group told Rolling Stone:

We wanted to present three important and well-known Korean songs: "Honorable Live and Death," "Arirang" and "We'll Go to Mt. Paektu." In the end, their censors asked us to take out "Honorable" and "Mt. Paektu," because we had changed them too much from the originals, and they are extremely sensitive about their own culture.

The row was apparently over the tempo of the song. Norwegian director Morten Traavik, who arranged the tour, said:

Both 'Honorable' and 'Mount Paektu' are songs that have a special significance politically and ideologically in North Korea [...] When Laibach did their versions... the songs were no longer recognizable to [the censors]... They were worried that the audience would react negatively and think that Laibach was making fun of and disrespecting the Korean culture.

== See also ==
- Music of North Korea
- Mt. Paektu (poem)
