= Military-First Girls =

Japanese fan club of the Moranbong Band

- Origin: Japan
- Genres: North Korean pop
- Years active: c. 2013–present
- Members: Chunhun; Unha; other unnamed members

Korean name
- Chosŏn'gŭl: 선군녀자
- Hancha: 先軍女子
Transcriptions
- Revised Romanization: Seongun Nyeoja
- McCune–Reischauer: Sŏn'gun Nyŏja

Japanese name
- Kanji: 先軍女子
- Kana: せんぐん じょし
Transcriptions
- Romanization: Sengun Joshi

The Military-First Girls (Japanese: 先軍女子, Hepburn: Sengun Joshi; from the Korean term Songun) are a Japanese all-women fan club of the Moranbong Band, a North Korean girl group. The club has held live performances where members dance to North Korean pop songs, following the choreography of the Moranbong Band. The club's founder and leader is Chunhun, a Japanese illustrator who became interested in North Korean culture after coming across North Korean propaganda art during her university studies.

Chunhun has stated that her goal is to introduce North Korean culture to the Japanese public and normalize their perceptions of the country. She has compared her club's interest in North Korean music to other Japanese women's interest in K-pop and American singer Taylor Swift. Club members have received backlash from Japanese nationalists and right-wingers due to their perceived sympathies towards North Korea.

== Overview ==
The emergence of state-sponsored girl groups in North Korea has given rise to an overseas fanbase, especially in countries with large Korean diaspora communities, such as Japan. The 2012 debut of the Moranbong Band, with their unique interpretive styles, is credited with starting a niche fandom of North Korean pop music parallel to the Korean Wave in the South.

The Military-First Girls are an all-women fan club of the Moranbong Band organized by a Japanese woman with the pseudonym Chunhun. Club members occasionally meet for a women's only party (女子会, joshikai), with discussion topics ranging from their love lives to North Korea. The club held a live performance at a venue in Tokyo on 2 November 2017. Members dressed in homemade uniforms resembling those of the Moranbong Band and danced to North Korean pop songs, following the choreography of their idols.

== Members ==
=== Chunhun ===
Chunhun is the founder and leader of the Military-First Girls. A freelance illustrator and visual arts major from Kanagawa Prefecture, Chunhun grew an interest in North Korean culture after encountering North Korean propaganda art in university. She was previously a student intern for Daily NK, a South Korean news website that focuses on developments in North Korea. It was during this time that she began calling herself the "Military-First Girl". She started an online presence in 2013 and has attracted a significant following on social media. However, she attributes her difficulty in finding a job to her public profile.

Chunhun has stated that she is interested in North Korean culture specifically and does not support the North Korean government. In a 2017 interview with The Japan Times, she said: "By introducing North Korea's culture, like its fashion, music and arts, I want the Japanese public to realize there are good people living there and that they can't be blamed for what the government does." Chunhun often wears North Korean cosmetics purchased from souvenir shops in the Chinese city of Dandong, located on the China–North Korea border. She is also an avid reader of the Rodong Sinmun, the official newspaper of the Workers' Party of Korea and North Korea's official newspaper of record.

=== Unha ===
Ri Unha (a pseudonym) is the only Korean member of the Military-First Girls. She is a Zainichi Korean who attended North Korean schools in Japan run by Chongryon, an affiliate of the North Korean government. In her high school years, she learned about contemporary North Korean music from her textbooks and exercised to it during physical education classes. She also learned how to play the sohaegeum, a North Korean fiddle. She attended a Pochonbo Electronic Ensemble concert when they toured Japan.

Unha joined the Military-First Girls after discovering their Twitter profile. Like many other members, her renewed interest in North Korean music came from her viewing of the Moranbong Band's debut performance on YouTube.

=== Others ===
Another member of the club is a young housewife from Tokyo whose perception of North Korea was changed after she went on a four-day tour of the country with her husband. She described the North Korean capital Pyongyang as "more prosperous and cleaner than [she] had thought", and the North Korean soldiers who followed her tour group as "very kind" and "human too".

== Reception ==
The Military-First Girls have their own fans, known as tongmu (동무), a Korean term used chiefly in North Korea that is equivalent to the English term comrade. Unha credits her club with creating a cultural bridge between the local Japanese and Korean (Chongryon) communities.

The Military-First Girls have received significant backlash online from Japanese nationalists and right-wingers. Club members have been accused of being "anti-social" and "North Korean spies". Chunhun has personally been told to "drop dead" and been called a "cockroach".

Chunhun has defended her club by comparing their interest in North Korean culture to Japanese women's interest in the cultures of South Korea and the United States. In interviews conducted in 2017, she said: "I listen to [the Moranbong Band's] songs for the same reason many Japanese women listen to K-pop or Taylor Swift. ... Just like how there are women who like K-pop and South Korean culture, or women who like American singer Taylor Swift and wear makeup like hers, we just love North Korean culture."

In a 2021 interview, Unha described the backlash that followed the publication of the 2017 interviews: "The situation got serious after we did our first interview with Chunichi News, and then the criticism got even worse after the Reuters article on us. One member ended up losing her job. The people who criticized us were deluded into thinking we were propagandists for the Kim Jong Un regime even though it clearly said in the articles that we did not politically support the government." The Military First Girls' Twitter account was deleted sometime after the 2017 interviews.

== See also ==
- "Friendly Father" – North Korean pop song that went viral on social media outside of Korea
