= Kim Kwang-suk =

North Korean singer (1964–2018)

People's Artist of the DPRK Kim Kwang Sŭk
- 김광숙
- Born: January 22, 1964; Taesŏng District, P'yŏngyang, North Korea
- Died: January 14, 2018 (aged 53); P'yŏngyang, North Korea
- Burial place: Patriotic Martyrs' Cemetery
- Occupation: Vocalist
- Years active: 1983–2018
- Organization: Pochonbo Electronic Ensemble
- Known for: Singing
- Notable work: "What Is Life?", "The Dear Name Kim Jŏng Il", "Brother Louie", "My Dear Is A Hero Now", "Where Are You, Dear General?", "Chŏllima on the Wing","Golden Trees, Apple Trees, Planted in the Mountains"
- Style: Electrofolk
- Political party: Workers' Party of Korea
- Spouse: Jŏn Kwŏn
- Awards: People's Artist of the DPRK

Korean name
- Hangul: 김광숙
- Hanja: 金光淑
- RR: Gim Gwangsuk
- MR: Kim Kwangsuk

Kim Kwang Sŭk (Korean: 김광숙; January 22, 1964 – January 14, 2018) was a North Korean singer of the Pochonbo Electronic Ensemble.

It was said she inspired the creation of the Moranbong Band.

== Biography ==
In 1983, Kim Kwang Sŭk visited Japan as part of the Pyongyang Student Youth Arts Troupe (평양학생소년예술단). She became a member of the Pochonbo Electronic Ensemble in 1986. She was awarded the title of Merited Artist at the age of 24 in 1988. She was awarded the title of People's Artist in 1992. Before she died, she worked as a vocal instructor at the Pyongyang Youth Student Palace (평양학생소년궁전, also known as the Pyongyang Students and Children's Palace). Her husband was Jŏn Kwŏn, who was a pianist for the Pochonbo Electronic Ensemble.

In January 14, 2018, she died of a heart attack at age 53. The Head of State, Kim Jong Un, personally expressed his condolences at her funeral.
