= Sonu Hyang-hui =

North Korean violinist

- Born: North Korea
- Occupations: Singer and politician
- Labels: Moranbong Band, Samjiyon Orchestra

- Sonu Hyang-hui
- Hangul: 선우향희
- RR: Seonu Hyanghui
- MR: Sŏnu Hyanghŭi

Sonu Hyang-hui (Korean: 선우향희) is a North Korean violinist. She is best known for her role as leader of the string section of the Moranbong Band.

== Early life ==
She graduated from Kim Won Gyun University of Music in Pyongyang.

== Career ==
She performed with the Samjiyon Band (renamed Orchestra in 2018).

In 2012, she became the leader of the string section (and in some concerts concertmaster) of the Moranbong Band. She was missing from the band at times, but re-appeared for some concerts.

== Personal life ==
In August 2021 she married with Kim Yo-Jong's brother in Law.
