= Hyon Song-wol =

North Korean musician (born 1977)

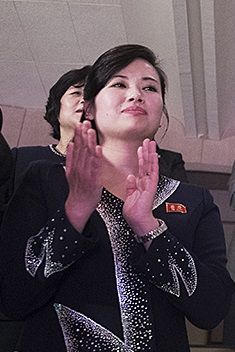
- Hyon Song-wol at the National Theatre on 11 February 2018 in Seoul, South Korea

Member of the Central Committee of the Workers Party of Korea
- Incumbent
- Assumed office April 2019
- General Secretary: Kim Jong-Un

Director of the Moranbong Band
- In office July 2012 – January 2018
- Preceded by: Position created

Director of the Samjiyon Orchestra
- In office January 2018 – unknown
- Preceded by: Position created

Personal details
- Born: 1977 (age 48–49) North Korea
- Citizenship: North Korean
- Party: Workers' Party of Korea
- Education: Kim Won-gyun University of Music
- Occupation: Singer and politician

Military service
- Allegiance: North Korea
- Branch: Korean People's Army
- Service years: 1995–present
- Rank: Colonel

Korean name
- Hangul: 현송월
- Hanja: 玄松月
- RR: Hyeon Songwol
- MR: Hyŏn Songwŏl

Hyon Song-wol (Korean: 현송월; born 1977) is a North Korean singer, band leader, and politician. She is the leader of the Moranbong Band and of the Samjiyon Orchestra. She was formerly a featured vocalist for the Pochonbo Electronic Ensemble in the early 2000s, a pop group which found fame in North Korea in the late 1980s and 1990s. She has been a member in the Central Committee of the Workers' Party of Korea since 2017.

== Early life ==
Hyon Song-wol was allegedly born on 17 September 1977, in an ordinary household in Pyongyang. Her musical talents caught attention in her school years, which provided her the opportunity to attend Kum Song School and Pyongyang Kim Won Gyun University of Music and Dance, which are known to be the training grounds for North Korean entertainers.

It is reported that she met Kim Jong-un and his sister Kim Yo-jong numerous times in her youth while at Kim Jong-il's secret villa.

== Musical career ==
Hyon was a vocalist for the Wangjaesan Light Music Band and Pochonbo Electronic Ensemble. Her biggest hit was the song "Excellent Horse-like Lady", (Note: 준마처녀; 駿馬處女; Chunma ch'ŏnyŏ) a 1999 song extolling the virtues of a Stakhanovite textile factory worker. The accompanying music video stars Hyon in the role of "the heroine, dashing around a sparkling factory with a beatific smile, distributing bobbins and collecting swatches of cloth at top speed." The lyrics include:

Our factory comrades say in jest,
Why, they tell me I am a virgin on a stallion,
After a full day's work I still have energy left...

They say I am a virgin on a stallion,
Mounting a stallion my Dear Leader gave me.
All my life I will live to uphold his name!

Hyon's other best known songs include "Footsteps of Soldiers", "I Love Pyongyang", "She is a Discharged Soldier" and "We are Troops of the Party".

=== Band and orchestra director ===
From 2012 to 2018, Hyon acted as the leader of the Moranbong Band girl group, which was reported as the most popular music act in the country during its tenure. The selection of Hyon in this role as a relatively young woman fit within the intentions of the early Kim Jong Un era, where cultural initiatives like Moranbong were set up to please important social strata like Pyongyang elites, military and technical professionals, and in particular, women.

In December 2015, Hyon travelled to Beijing to perform with the Moranbong Band in a series of private concerts, which were cancelled due to disputes between the organising countries.

From 2018 onwards, Hyon acted as the director of the Samjiyon Orchestra.

In January 2018, she attended as a representative of the North Korean side at the inter-Korean working-level talks held at the Panmunjom Unification Pavilion regarding the dispatch of an art troupe for the 2018 PyeongChang Winter Olympics. In February, Hyon returned with the orchestra for a series of concerts for the games, in which she sung "Peaktu and Hala are My Motherland" with the orchestra.

== Political career ==
In 2017, she was appointed to the Central Committee of the Workers' Party of Korea.

Again in April 2019, she was promoted to a member of the Central Committee of the Workers' Party of Korea at the 4th Plenary Meeting of the 7th Central Committee. In June of that year, she organized protocol for Kim Jong Un at the trilateral summit between South Korea, North Korea and the United States at Panmunjom. This was originally a role performed by Kim's sister, Kim Yo Jong.

Hyon's visibility in North Korean politics increased again in 2020, when she made multiple appearances, including her inspection of typhoon-ravaged areas with Kim Jong Un, in the country, acting in a position of Technical Secretary to Kim.

She was re-elected to the Central Committee at the 8th Congress of the WPK in January 2021.

She is identified by analysts as a top aide in the regime, and solidified this position by accompanying Kim Jong Un and wife Ri Sol Ju, as well as a handful of powerful party and state officials, to the Kumsusan Palace of the Sun to pay their respects for former leaders Kim Il Sung and Kim Jong Il. This demonstrated that her rank had risen to the point where she could participate in an event that various other party, cabinet and military officials were unable to attend.

In 2026, Hyon appeared in national media with Kim Jong Un and Kim Ju-ae during a meeting between 'key party officials and military commanders'. Hyon can be seen firing a then recently developed sniper rifle alongside Kim Yo-jong.

On 22 February 2026, she was re-elected as a member of the Central Committee at the 9th Congress of the Workers' Party of Korea.

== Personal life ==
Hyon has a teenage daughter who has accompanied her to various events in 2025 to 2026.

=== Rumors and controversies ===
==== Marriage and rumors of involvement with Kim Jong Un ====
Hyon disappeared from public view in 2006 when, according to reports in the Japanese media, she married a North Korean army officer with whom she had a child. She was reported to have known Kim Jong Un, the youngest son of former North Korean leader Kim Jong Il, since they were both teenagers. South Korean government sources told the media that Hyon and Kim Jong Un had been romantically involved in the early 2000s after he returned to North Korea from his studies at a public school in Switzerland. His father reportedly disapproved of the relationship and the younger Kim and Hyon broke it off.

Following Kim Jong Il's death in December 2011, Kim Jong Un was thought to have resumed the relationship. According to South Korean intelligence sources, "rumors about the two having an affair have been circulating among Pyongyang's top elite".

In early July 2012, public interest in Kim Jong Un's personal life increased when Korean Central Television, North Korea's state-run media station, released footage of Kim sitting next to a then-unidentified woman who frequently appeared with him in public events. South Korean intelligence officials initially identified the woman as Hyon. However, on 25 July 2012, North Korean media announced that the woman was Ri Sol-ju.

On 16 November 2023, The Korea Times published an article in which Choe Su-yong, a former official at the National Intelligence Service (NIS), alleged that Hyon is the mother of Kim Jong Un's eldest child. Choe also alleged that this child is a son known as Il-bong.

==== Execution rumor ====
On 29 August 2013, South Korean newspaper The Chosun Ilbo reported that Hyon had been executed by firing squad on the orders of Kim Jong Un, along with 11 other performers, including violinist Mun Kyong-jin, both of whom had allegedly made illegal pornographic videos. According to a source quoted by the newspaper, "They were executed with machine guns while the key members of the Unhasu Orchestra, the Wangjaesan Light Music Band and the Moranbong Band as well as the families of the victims looked on".

Pyongyang's state news agency KCNA denied claims that the singer was executed, and a Japanese news magazine reported that she was seen subsequently. On 16 May 2014, Hyon appeared on North Korean television participating in the National Convention of Artists. However, at the time, some theorized that the government may have used an older video to make it seem as though she were still alive.

== See also ==
- Media coverage of North Korea
- List of North Korean musicians
- Music of North Korea
