= Mansudae Art Troupe =

North Korean musical ensemble

Korean name
- Chosŏn'gŭl: 만수대예술단
- Hancha: 萬壽臺藝術團
- Revised Romanization: Mansudae Yesuldan
- McCune–Reischauer: Mansutae Yesultan

The Mansudae Art Troupe (Korean: 만수대예술단; MR: Mansutae Yesultan) is a North Korean troupe of musicians that create light-classical operas and music, as well as dance pieces.

== History ==
The Mansudae Art Troupe is the successor to the Central Art Troupe that was formed on 27 September 1969. According to the KCNA however "Its predecessor was the Pyongyang Art Troupe founded in Juche 35 (1946)". In the 1970s, Kim Jong Il, before he became leader, made sure the Mansudae Art Troupe portrayed his father Kim Il Sung as a revolutionary genius who liberated Korea from the Japanese occupation, portrayed the history of the Kim family favourably and eulogising North Korean revolutionaries.

The Mansudae Art Troupe has performed over 700 times in over 50 countries. It played a key role in producing the revolutionary opera The Flower Girl (1972) a tragic story about North Korea under Japanese occupation during the 1930s and said to have been written by Kim Il Sung. The Troupe is said to have performed Flower Girl 1,300 times and Hong Yong-hee an actress from the film of the opera, is on the North Korean one-Won bank note. The Mansudae Art Troupe also performed the "Song of Paradise" (1976) over 340 times.

The troupe has also created 1,500 songs and over 500 instrumental pieces and was awarded the Order of Kim Il Sung in 1972.

Dancers from the troupe appeared in three North Korean Stamps issued in 1973.

Ko Yong-hui was a dancer in the Mansudae Art Troupe in the 1970s. She met Kim Jong Il in 1975 and became his consort although he was already married to Kim Yong-Sook. Ko had three children by Kim Jong Il.

Jo Myung-Ae, who was a dancer in the troupe in the 2000s, gained acclaim and a fanbase in South Korea, and subsequently became known for her work in cross-North and South campaigns.

The troupe performed in a concert in Pyongyang, celebrating the start of 2019.

== Pochonbo Electronic Ensemble ==
In 1985 the Pochonbo Electronic Ensemble was formed from the electronic music orchestra of the Mansudae Art Troupe as a separate independent band. Instruments included electronic pianos and synthesizers as well as traditional Korean musical instruments. Previously electronic music had not been encouraged in North Korea.

== The Samjiyon Band ==
The Samjiyon Band was started in 2009 as part of the Mansudae Art Troupe by order of Kim Jong Il. It is distinct from, but possibly composed of the same artists as the Samjiyon Orchestra. In 2018 North and South Korea agreed 140 musicians, singers and dancers from this orchestra, led by Hyon Song-wol would perform in Gangneung and Seoul in South Korea during the Winter Olympics.

== See also ==
- Wangjaesan Light Music Band
- Music of North Korea
- List of North Korean musicians
