= Music of North Korea =

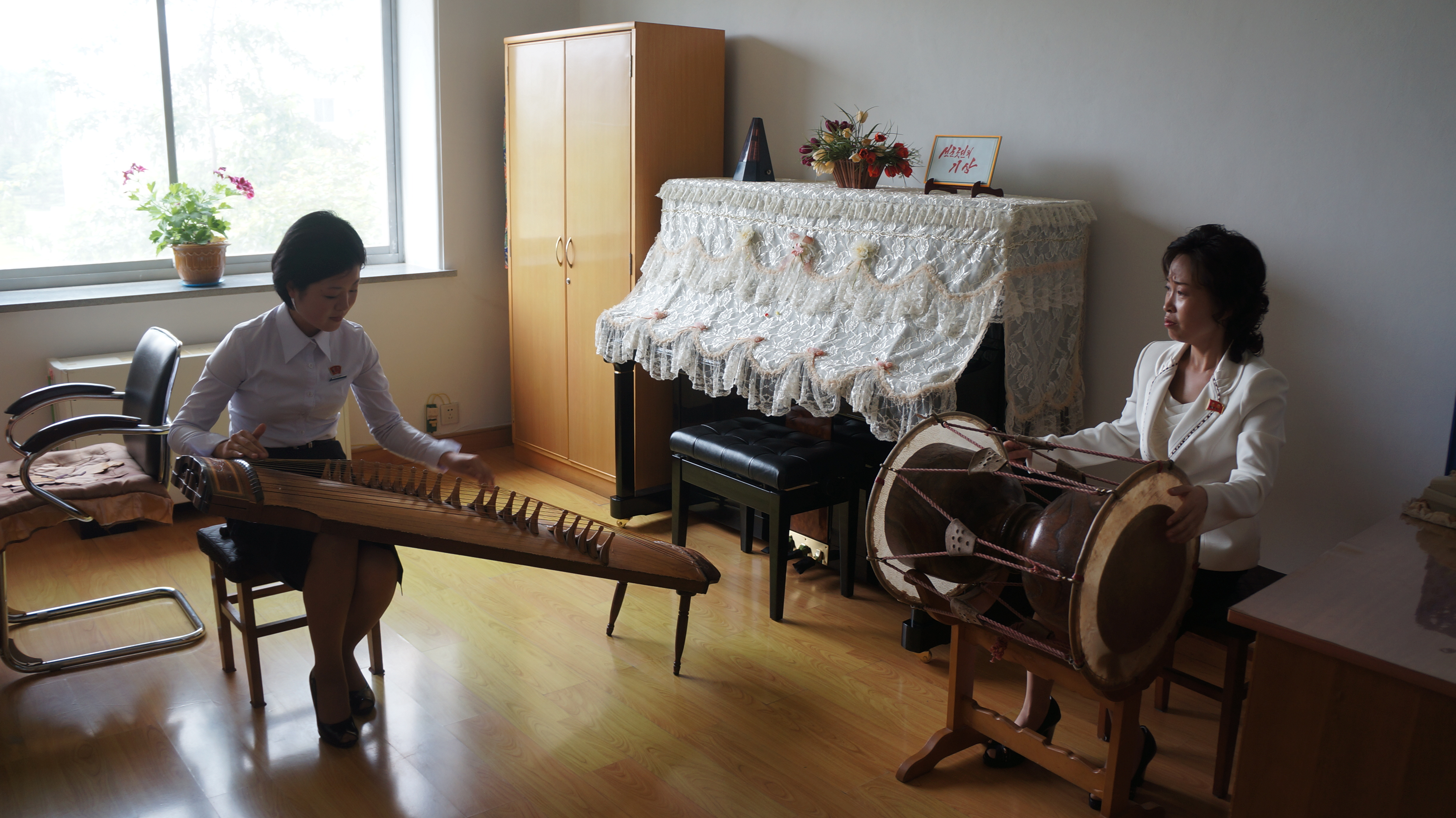
Two women playing a gayageum and a janggu, Korean traditional instruments, in Pyongyang

The music of North Korea includes a wide array of folk, popular, light instrumental, political, and classical performers. Beyond patriotic and political music, popular music groups like Pochonbo Electronic Ensemble and Moranbong Band perform songs about everyday life in North Korea and modern light pop reinterpretations of classic Korean folk music. Music education is widely taught in schools, with President Kim Il Sung first implementing a program of study of musical instruments in 1949 at an orphanage in Mangyongdae. Musical diplomacy also continues to be relevant to North Korea, with musical and cultural delegations completing concerts in China and France in recent years, and musicians from Western countries and South Korea collaborate on projects in North Korea.

== Taejung kayo ==
After the division of Korea in 1945 and the establishment of North Korea in 1948, revolutionary song-writing traditions were channeled into support for the state, eventually becoming a style of patriotic song called taejung kayo (대중가요) in the 1980s combining classical Western symphonic music, the Soviet socialist realism style, and Korean traditional musical forms. The songs are generally sung by female and male performers - either a choir, small groups or a soloist - with accompanying bands or choirs accompanied by a large orchestra (either Western style, traditional or a hybrid of western and traditional) or a concert band, and in recent years, a pop band or big band/jazz band with guitars, electric guitars, keyboards, piano, strings, double bass, a drum kit and brass section with occasional accordions and traditional instrumentation.

North Korean music follows the principles of Juche (self-reliance) ideology. The characteristic march like, upbeat music of North Korea is composed, rarely individually performed.

Much music is composed for movies, television dramas, and TV movies, and the works of the Korean composer Isang Yun (1917–1995), who spent much of his life in Germany, are popular in North Korea.

== Pop music ==
DPRK-pop
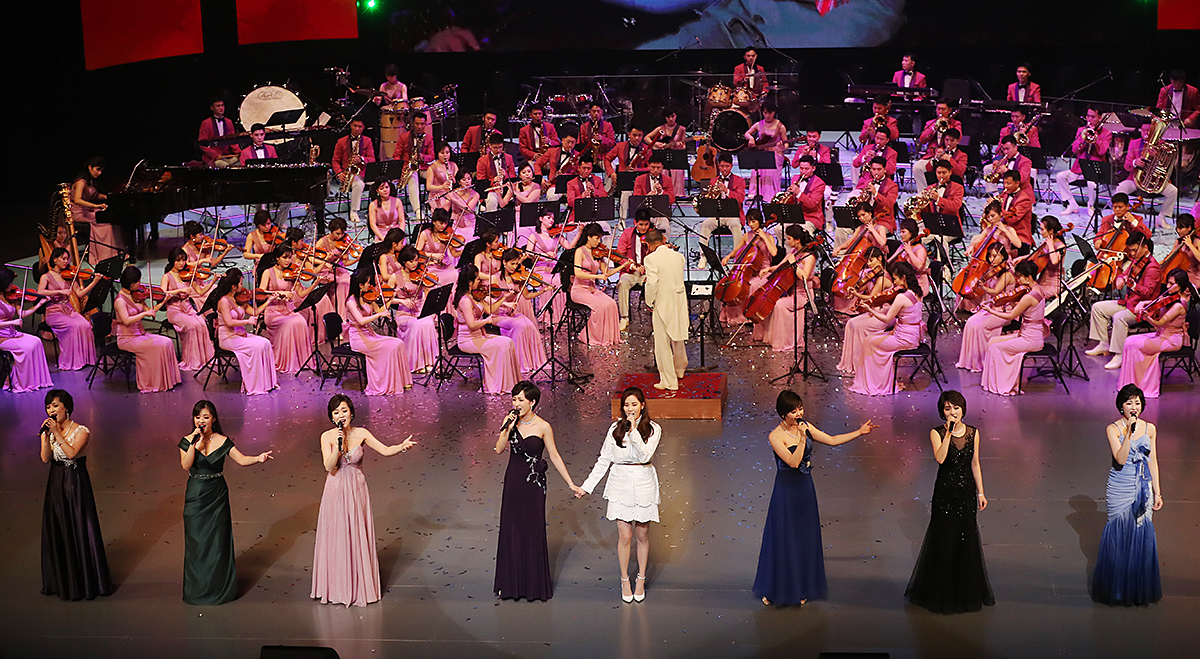
- The Samjiyon Band, a DPRK-pop music ensemble, performance in Seoul, South Korea on February 11, 2018.
- Native name: 조선-팝
- Etymology: Democratic People's Republic of Korea's popular music
- Other names: North Korean popular music (NK-pop)
- Stylistic origins: Korean music; electronic; pop; jazz; folk; classical; rock

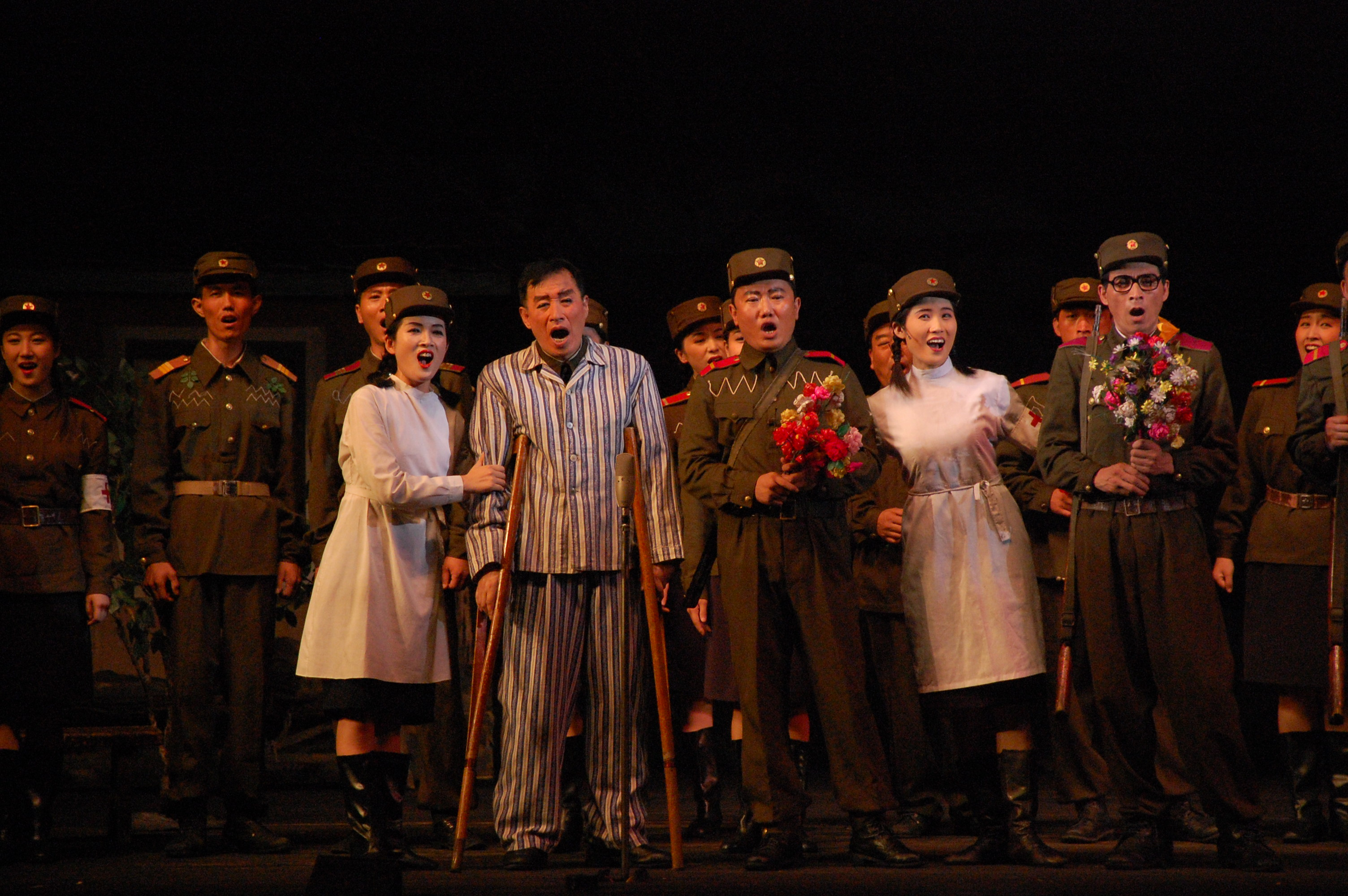
Performance at a Pyongyang opera

Under Kim Il Sung's era, only ideologically correct music was allowed. Jazz in particular was considered out of bounds. Many artists however found their way around these limitations by writing ideologically correct lyrics while taking liberties with the score. Under Kim Jong Il, previously forbidden genres, even jazz, became permissible and encouraged.

Many North Korean pop songs are usually performed by young female singers with an electric ensemble, percussionist, and accompanying singers and dancers. However, there are also male singers or a chorus in community or company pop bands. Some North Korean pop songs such as "Whistle"—set to the lyrics of North Korean poet Cho Ki-chon—have become popular in South Korea. Common lyrical themes include military might ("We Shall Hold Bayonets More Firmly", "Look At Us!", "One Against a Hundred"), economic production and thrift ("The Joy of Bumper Harvest Overflows Amidst the Song of Mechanisation", "Attain the Cutting Edge (The CNC Song)", "I Also Raise Chickens", "Potato Pride", "Chollima on the Wing"), patriotism ("My Country Is the Best", "We Have Nothing To Envy", "Onwards Toward the Final Victory") and glorification of the party and leaders ("Where Are You, Dear General?", "No Motherland Without You", "Don't Ask My Name", "The General Uses Warp", "Footsteps"). Songs like "We Are One" and "Reunification Rainbow" sing of the hopes for Korean reunification. There are also songs with more casual themes, such as "Women Are Flowers" and "Ballad of Gold Mountains".

In 2012, North Korea's first major girl band, the Moranbong Band, made its world debut. It is a group of about sixteen North Korean women (eleven instrumentalists and five singers) which was hand-selected by Kim Jong Un.

BBC radio disc jockey Andy Kershaw noted, on a visit to North Korea with Koryo Tours in 2003, that the only recordings available were by the pop singers Jon Hye-yong, Kim Kwang-suk, Jo Kum-hwa and Ri Pun-hui, and the groups Wangjaesan Light Music Band, the Mansudae Art Troupe and the Pochonbo Electronic Ensemble, who play in a style Kershaw refers to as "light instrumental with popular vocal". There is also the State Symphony Orchestra, the Sea of Blood Opera Company, two choruses, an orchestra and an ensemble dedicated to Isang Yun's compositions, all in Pyongyang. The Pyongyang Film Studios also produces many instrumental songs for its films, and several programs on Korean Central Television have music made and performed by the Central Radio and Television Orchestra.

In 2023, a new remix of the song Envy Us was released for the New Years Concert, with singers led by Jong Hong-ran in modern clothing and hairstyles. The song was noticed as being similar to K-Pop with a more modern feeling, causing widespread attention in and out of North Korea.

For the 2025 Mass Games in honour of the 80th anniversary of the Worker's Party of Korea, singer Jong Hong-ran returned singing a rendition of We Will Follow Our Party Forever, with a similar modern outfit with other singers also in more K-pop style clothing. Older North Korean songs were remixed, typically known for their solemn and lyrical style, now set to faster beats and more a more upbeat nature, reflecting the change in North Korean music style in the 2020s to become more modern.

North Korean pop music is available for visitors to Pyongyang at the Koryo Hotel or Pyongyang Department Store No. 1, as well as gift shops in tourist destinations. International and Western music can be enjoyed by locals and tourists at the Grand People's Study House, Pyongyang's central library.

== Music of Enlightenment ==
A lot of songs composed during Korea under Japanese rule, which are known in South Korea today as Trot are called "Enlightenment Period song" (계몽기 가요). It is no longer composed as propaganda music has since displaced other musical forms. Those songs were only orally-recorded for a long time. However, it was intentionally revived during the Kim Jong Il administration: in the late 2000s, Korean Central Television aired a TV program that introduced those "Enlightenment songs".

== Folk music ==
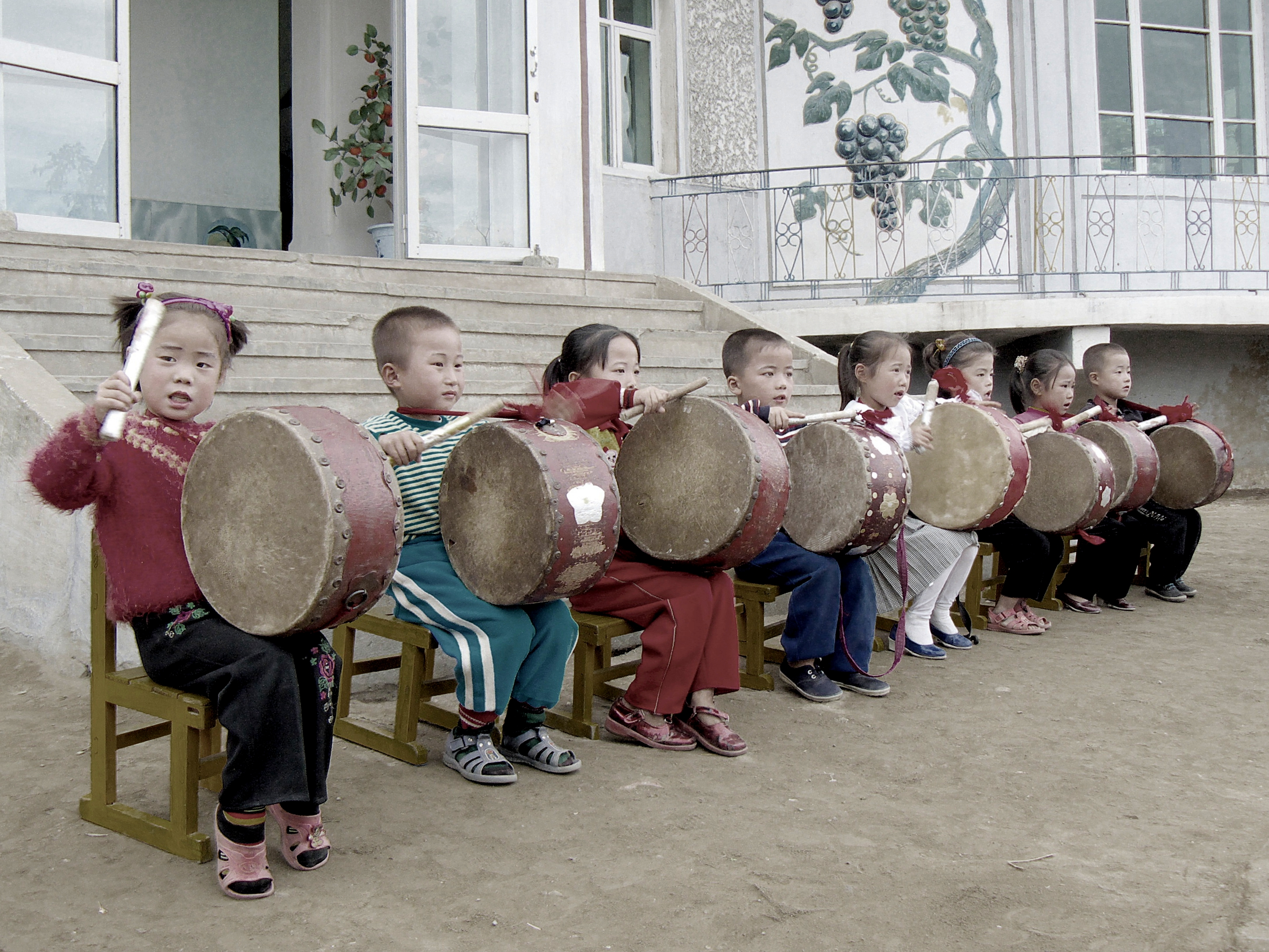
North Korean children performing for tourists at Chonsam Cooperative Farm near Wonsan

Alongside contemporary pop songs, groups like Pochonbo Electronic Ensemble have recorded arrangements of Korean folk songs. The Korean folk song "Arirang" continues to be widely popular in North Korea, with UNESCO inscribing the song to the Representative List of the Intangible Cultural Heritage of Humanity in 2014, representing North Korea.

Like Korean music in general, North Korean music includes kinds of both folk and classical, courtly music, including genres like sanjo, pansori, and nongak. Pansori is long vocal and percussive music played by one singer and one drummer. The lyrics tell one of five different stories, but is individualized by each performer, often with updated jokes and audience participation. Nongak is a rural form of percussion music, typically played by twenty to thirty performers. Sanjo is entirely instrumental that shifts rhythms and melodic modes during the song. Instruments include the changgo drum set against a melodic instrument, such as the gayageum or ajaeng.

== Instruments ==
In North Korea, traditional instruments have been adapted in order to allow them to compete with Western instruments. Many older musical forms remain and are used in both traditional performances that have been attuned to the ideas and the way of life of the modern North Korean communist state and to accompany modern songs in praise of Kim Il Sung, his son and successor, Kim Jong Il, and Kim Jong Un from 2012 onward, plus songs that wish for a reunited Korea, thus creating a mix of traditional and Western music that is truly North Korean, a unique variant of Korean music as a whole mixing the old and the new.

The modern Ongnyugeum zithers and the Sohaegeum four stringed fiddle are North Korean modernized versions of traditional Korean musical instruments, both used in traditional and modern musical forms.

Military music, in contrast, often makes extensive use of Western brass, woodwind, and percussion instruments, often omitting the Korean ones entirely. Although usually original compositions, the melodies are not easily distinguishable from Western ones in the absence of their lyrics, which heavily feature the customary ideologically oriented content.

== Active musical groups and ensembles ==
=== Military ===
- Song and Dance Ensemble of the Korean People's Army
- Korean People's Army State Merited Chorus and Symphony Orchestra
- Song and Dance Ensemble of the Korean People's Navy
- Song and Dance Ensemble of the Korean People's Air Force
- Song and Dance Ensemble of the Ministry of People's Security of the DPRK
- Central Military Band of the Korean People's Army
- Women's Military Marching Band of the Department of People's Security of the DPRK

=== Civilian ===
- Unhasu National Orchestra
- State Symphony Orchestra of the Democratic People's Republic of Korea
- Isang Yun Symphony Orchestra
- Symphony Orchestra of the State Affairs Commission
- Pochonbo Electronic Ensemble
- Wangjaesan Light Music Band and Wangjaesan Dance Troupe
- Moranbong Band
- Chongbong Band
- Musical groups under the Mansudae Art Troupe (MAT)
  - MAT Merited Women's Instrumental Ensemble
    - MAT Samjiyon Band
      - Samjiyon Orchestra
  - MAT Chorus
  - Pyongyang Philharmonic Orchestra
- National Philharmonic Orchestra of the Democratic People's Republic of Korea
- National Folk Art Troupe
- Pyongyang Symphony Orchestra
- Phibada Opera Troupe
- State Youth Orchestra of the Democratic People's Republic of Korea
- Kim Il-sung Youth Philharmonic
- KCBS-KCTV Central Radio and Television Orchestra
- Hwasong Pop Band

=== Foreign ===
- Military-First Girls (Japan)

== See also ==
- Korean revolutionary opera
- List of North Korean musicians
- List of North Korean operas
- Traditional music of Korea
- Music of South Korea
