= Ri Kyong-suk =

North Korean singer (born 1980)

People's Artist of the DPRK Ri Kyŏng Suk
- 리경숙
- Ri Kyŏng Sŭk performing at a concert in Kim Il Sung Square in 2015
- Born: January 1, 1970 (age 56); P’yŏngch’ŏn District, P'yŏngyang, North Korea
- Occupations: Vocalist; Professor
- Years active: 1988–2015, 2016–present
- Organization: Pochonbo Electronic Ensemble
- Known for: Singing
- Style: Electrofolk
- Political party: Workers' Party of Korea
- Spouse: Kim Yŏng Il
- Children: Kim Nam Jŭn, Kim Ye Eŭn
- Awards: People's Artist of the DPRK

Ri Kyŏng Suk (Korean: 리경숙; Hancha: 李京淑; born January 1, 1970 in Pyongyang) is a North Korean singer of the Pochonbo Electronic Ensemble.

== Biography ==
Ri Kyŏng Suk was born to an engineer father and a train driver mother as the eldest of three siblings on 1 January 1970, in the Pyongchon District of Pyongyang. At the age of 7, she began singing in opera productions, where her talent was quickly recognized. She is currently living in the Moranbong District of Pyongyang with her husband Kim Yŏng Il, a member of the Ministry of Culture and bass guitar player in the Pochonbo Electronic Ensemble. She has a son, Kim Nam Jŭn and a daughter, Kim Ye Eŭn.

== Career ==
Ri's career started in the late 1970s as a singer and actor in opera productions. At age 7, she played a role in the revolutionary opera The Song of Mount Kumgang, and in middle school, she played a role in the famous revolutionary opera titled The Sea of Blood. Around 1985, she was selected by a director from the Korean Film Studio to act in the film Female Teacher.

She joined the newly created Pochonbo Electronic Ensemble in 1988, and quickly became famous in both the North and the South. In 1991, she toured Japan with the Ensemble, performing for Koreans in Japan. After 2000, her fame declined slowly alongside the Ensemble's popularity.

In 2015, Ri performed on 11 October in the 10 000 People Strong Grand Art Performance Celebrating the 70th Anniversary of the Workers' Party of Korea, commonly known as Great Party, Rosy Korea, with the Pochonbo Electronic Ensemble. She also performed in the concert Songs of Memories, held on 21 February 2015, a concert held by older artists, where she could be seen singing Glad to Meet You and My Country is the Best with her bandmates from the Ensemble, earning strong engagement from the audience.

Since then, Ri has been working at the Kim Won Gyun University of Music in Pyongyang as a professor, teaching since 2016. In 2020, she was spotted in a North Korean news broadcast as being part of a propaganda squad, encouraging workers at construction sites. In 2022, she was interviewed during a TV documentary about the film and song "Urban Girl Comes to Get Married". On January 26, 2025, she attended composer Hwang Jin Yŏng's funeral, along with other singers of the Pochonbo Electronic Ensemble.

== Filmography ==
Year	Title	Role
1985	Female Teacher	Role Unknown

== Theater ==
Year	Title	Role
1977	The Song of Mount Kumgang	Role Unknown
Early 1970s	The Sea of Blood	Role Unknown

== Famous songs ==
- Glad to Meet You (반갑습니다)
- Arirang (아리랑)
- We Will Win (우리는 승리하리라)
- I Look at You and Think (너를 보며 생각하네)
- Urban Girl Comes to Get Married (도시처녀 시집와요). This song is the theme song of the 1993 comedy film under the same name
- See You Again (다시 만납시다)
- My Country is the Best (내 나라 제일로 좋아). This song is the theme song of the 1992-2002 film series The Nation and Destiny (민족과 운명).
- My Love, My Happiness (나의 사랑 나의 행복). This song is the theme song of the film My Happiness (나의 행복)
- A Crossroads of Faith (운명의 갈림길)
- Don't Ask My Name (내 이름 묻지 마세요)
- No Motherland Without You (당신이 없으면 조국도 없다)
