= Republic of Korea Army Band =

South Korean marching band

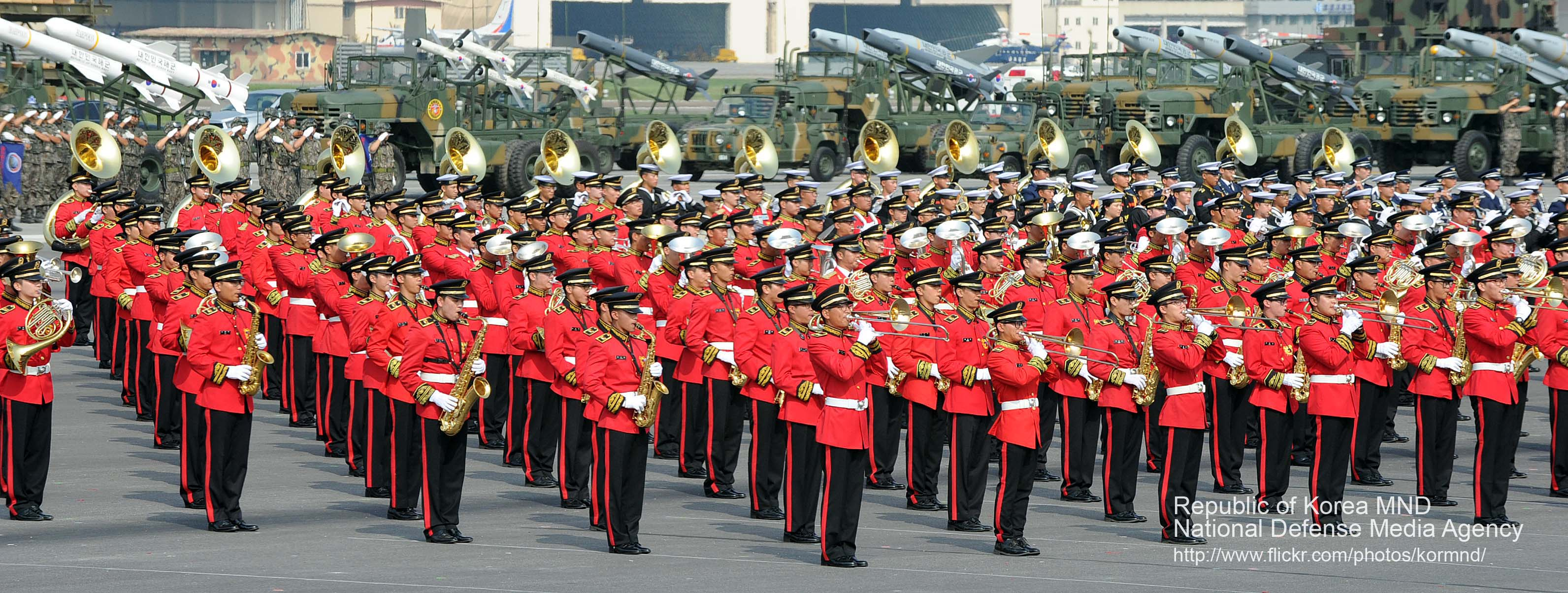
The band during the ceremony of the 65th Anniversary of ROK Armed Forces.

The Republic of Korea Army Band (ROK Army Band; Korean: 대한민국 육군군악대) is a South Korean state ceremonies unit of the Republic of Korea Army that is the representative marching band of the ROK Army and the seniormost one in the ROK Armed Forces, reporting directly to the Army Capital Defense Command. It specializes in Korean martial and traditional music and modernized adaptations of folk songs for performances during concerts. It mainly performs at state arrival ceremonies at the Blue House in Seoul with the Joint-Service Guard of Honour. It was formed in the 1950s as a result of a pan-ROKAF creation of military bands.

In 2003, the band took part in the Edinburgh Military Tattoo. It has participated in the Virginia International Tattoo in 2007 and 2010. A notable public relations moment for the band took place in September 2017 when it took part in a drum competition between the ROK Band's drumline and the III Marine Expeditionary Force Band in the United States Marine Corps. After the competitive moment ended, The III MEF band director referred to it as a "tie".

Musicians must be 18-28 at the time they join and must have an academic degree recognized by the Ministry of National Defense. All musicians are all volunteering civilians, following the example of military bands in Canada and the United Kingdom. Once every two months, military officers are selected from the enlisted members of the band.

== See also ==
- Korean People's Army State Merited Chorus and Symphony Orchestra
- Central Military Band of the Korean People's Army
- Daechwita
