= Chon Hye-yong =

North Korean singer (born 1972)

People's Artist of the DPRK Chŏn Hye Yŏng
- 전혜영
- Chŏn Hye Yŏng performing at a concert in Kim Il Sung Square in 2015
- Born: August 10, 1972 (age 54); Tongdaewŏn District, P'yŏngyang, North Korea
- Occupation: Vocalist
- Years active: 1983–2015
- Organization: Pochonbo Electronic Ensemble
- Known for: Singing
- Style: Electrofolk
- Political party: Workers' Party of Korea
- Awards: People's Artist of the DPRK

Chŏn Hye Yŏng (Korean: 전혜영; born August 10, 1972, in Pyongyang) is a North Korean singer of the Pochonbo Electronic Ensemble.

== Biography ==
Chŏn Hye Yŏng was born on August 10, 1972, in Pyongyang, North Korea to a father who worked as a coal miner and a mother who was a middle school teacher.

In 1983, Chŏn performed in Japan as a part of the P'yŏngyang Students and Children's Art Troupe (평양학생소년예술단) and received the Kim Il Sung Youth Honor Award (김일성소년영예상). She joined the Pochonbo Electronic Ensemble in 1988 and was awarded the title of Merited Artist in 1991 and People's Artist in 1992.

Since 2011, Chŏn has been working as a vocal instructor at the Mangyongdae Children's Palace (만경대학생소년궁전).

On January 26, 2025, Chŏn attended composer Hwang Jin Yŏng's funeral along with other singers of the Pochonbo Electronic Ensemble.

== Selected discography ==
- Whistle (휘파람)
- Warm is the Motherland's Love (조국의 사랑은 따사로워라)
- Cuckoo (뻐꾸기) (Note: Chon performed these songs in the 2015 concert Great Party, Rosy Korea.)
- Thinking of the General (장군님 생각)
- His solicitude unforgettable (그 품을 못 잊어)
