= Great Party, Rosy Korea =

2015 concert in North Korea

Great Party, Rosy Korea 위대한 당, 찬란한 조선
- Genre: Artistic Performance
- Date: 11 October 2015
- Frequency: Once-off
- Venue: Taedong River, Kim Il Sung Square
- Locations: Pyongyang, North Korea
- Country: North Korea

The 10 000 People Strong Grand Art Performance Celebrating the 70th Anniversary of the Workers' Party of Korea "Great Party, Rosy Korea" (조선로동당창건 70돐경축 1만명대공연 《위대한 당, 찬란한 조선》) was a one-off artistic performance held on the 11th of October 2015 in celebration of the 70th anniversary of the ruling Workers' Party of Korea. The performance was originally meant to be hosted on the evening of the 10th of October, however, this was moved back a day due to wet weather.

The performance was held on a large floating stage in the middle of the Taedong River with the Juche Tower as its backdrop. The audience was seating along the steps of the river as well as on seating in Kim Il Sung Square. The large stage was decorated with a large red flag baring the hammer, sickle and writing brush of the Workers' Party as well as a large LED display. On ether side of the stage, multi-colour dancing fountains

The show was directed by People's Artiste Ryang Chang-nam (인민예술가 량창남) and was produced by O Yongchŏl (오영철), O Hungchŏl (오훙철) and Ri Yunho (리윤호). The business team consisted of Department Director at the Ministry of Culture Kwon Hyok-bong (권혁봉), Kim Haksun (김학순) and Peoples' Artist Ryang Changnam (인민예술가 량창남).

== Artistic Program ==
The performance was divided into two sections, with a total duration of over 3 hours.

=== Part 1 ===
| | Type | Performers | English title | Korean Title |
|---|---|---|---|---|
| | Mixed chorus and orchestra | | Aegukka | 애국가 |
| | Female quartet and mixed chorus | Arranged by Chae Ju Hyok | Opening: Glory to our Great Party | 서장: 영광을 드리자 위대한 우리 당에 |
| 1 | Narration | Ri Ji Yong, Paek Sung Ran | Opening Narration | 설화 |
| 2 | Male solo and mixed chorus | People's Actor Kim Sung Yon | Song of Comradeship | 동지애의 노래 |
| 3 | Theatrical display and music | Kim Son Nam, Ri Jong Chon, Hong Yong Hui | The Owner of the Revolution is Our People | 혁명의 주인은 우리 인민 |
| 4 | Dance | Kim Su Mi and 24 others | The Snow Falls | 눈이 네란다 |
| 4.1 | Mixed chorus and orchestra | | Song of General Kim Il Sung | 김일성 장군의 노래 |
| 5 | Medley | Arranged by Kim Ho Yun | Song Medley | 노래련곡 |
| 5.1 | Mixed sextet and mixed chorus | Kim Kyong Hui and 5 others | Song of Industrial Founding | 산업건국의 노래 |
| 5.2 | Female chorus and orchestra | | Song of Women | 녀성의 노래 |
| 6 | Dance | Choe Hyok Chol and 43 others | May, Month of Victory | 승리의 5월 |
| 7 | Children's chorus and theatrical display | Jong Kum Yong and 198 others | Korean Youth March | 소년단행진곡 |
| 8 | Theatrical display and music | Ri Hyon and 215 others | Song of National Defense | 조국보위의 노래 |
| 8.1 | Theatrical display and music | Choe Sam Suk | On the Road to Decisive Battle | 결전의 길로 |
| 9 | Mixed chorus and orchestra | | Song Dedicated to Marshal Kim Il Sung | 김일성원수께 드리는 노래 |
| 10 | Female ongum choir and mixed chorus | Pak Hye Kyong and 29 others | We Started from Scratch | 우리는 빈터에서 시작하였네 |
| 11 | Medley | | Song Medley | 노래련곡 |
| 11.1 | Mixed chorus and orchestra | | Song of the Cholima Army | 천리마대진군의 노래 |
| 11.2 | Male septet and mixed chorus | Ri Kum Hyok and 7 others | On the Road the Leader Wants Us to Follow | 수령님 바라시는 오직 한길에 |
| 11.3 | Mixed chorus and orchestra | | Following the Party Banner | 당의 기치 따라 |
| 12 | Female instrumental ensemble | O Phil Pae and 16 others | We'll Always Remain Loyal to You | 대를 이어 충성을 다하렵니다 |
| 13 | Male quartet and orchestra | Pak Kye Su and 3 others | It's all Thanks to the Great Leader's Care! | 수령님 은덕일세 |
| 13.1 | | Pak Kye Su and 3 others | Merry Laughter is in Full Bloom | 웃음꽃이 만발했네 |
| 14 | Female hendectet and orchestra | Choe Kum Hui and 10 others | I'll Remain True with a Single Heart | 일편단심 붉은 마음 간직합니다 |
| 14.1 | Female hendectet and orchestra | Choe Kum Hui and 10 others | Spring Song | 봄노래 |
| 15 | Female solo and mixed chorus | Han Hye Song | Song Dedicated to Comrade Kim Jong Il | 김정일 동지께 드리는 노래 |
| 15.1 | Mixed chorus and orchestra | | We will forever go along the road of loyalty! | 충성의 한길로 가고가리라 |
| 16 | Electronic Ensemble | Pochonbo Electronic Ensemble | My Country Full of Hope | 행복넘쳐라 나의 조국이여 |
| 17 | Medley | Kim Kwang Suk | Kim Kwang Suk Medley | 김광숙 노래련곡 |
| 17.1 | Female solo and mixed chorus | Kim Kwang Suk | The Dear Name | 친근한 이름 |
| 17.2 | Female solo and mixed chorus | Kim Kwang Suk | The Loving Smile | 사랑의 미소 |
| 17.3 | Female solo and mixed chorus | Kim Kwang Suk | What Is Life? | 생이란 무엇인가 |
| 17.4 | Female solo and mixed chorus | Kim Kwang Suk | Mother's Thoughts | 어머니생각 |
| 17.5 | Female solo and mixed chorus | Kim Kwang Suk | Golden Apple Trees Planted on Mountains | 황금나무 능금나무 산에 심었소 |
| 18 | Medley | Ri Pun Hui | Ri Pun Hui Medley | 리분희 노래련곡 |
| 18.1 | Female solo and female chorus | Ri Pun Hui | The Voice Calling Me | 나를 부르는 소리 |
| 18.2 | Female solo and female chorus | Ri Pun Hui | We Cannot Live Apart from His Bosom | 그 품 떠나 못살아 |
| 18.3 | Female solo and mixed chorus | Ri Pun Hui | Don't Advance, Night of Pyongyang | 지새지 말아다오 평양의 밤아 |
| 19 | Medley | Kim Jong Nyo | Kim Jong Nyo Medley | 김정녀 노래련곡 |
| 19.1 | Female solo and female chorus | Kim Jong Nyo | Ours Is a Family of Soldiers | 우리 집은 군인가정 |
| 19.2 | Female solo and female chorus | Kim Jong Nyo | Prosperous Arirang | 강성부흥아리랑 |
| 20 | Medley | Yun Hye Yong | Yun Hye Yong Medley | 윤혜영 노래련곡 |
| 20.1 | Female solo | Yun Hye Yong | My Heart Towards the Dear General Star | 구름넘어 그리운 장군별님께 |
| 20.2 | Female solo and female chorus | Yun Hye Yong | Stars Whisper, One, Two, Three | 별들이 속삭이네 하나 둘 셋 |
| 21 | Medley | Jon Hye Yong | Jon Hye Yong Medley | 전혜영 노래련곡 |
| 21.1 | Female solo | Jon Hye Yong | Whistle | 휘파람 |
| 21.2 | Female solo | Jon Hye Yong | Cuckoo | 뻐꾸기 |
| 21.3 | Female solo | Jon Hye Yong | Thinking of the General | 장군님생각 |
| 21.4 | Female solo | Jon Hye Yong | His Solicitude Unforgettable | 그 품을 못잊어 |
| 22 | Medley | Jo Kum Hwa | Jo Kum Hwa Medley | 조금화 노래련곡 |
| 22.1 | Female solo and female chorus | Jo Kum Hwa | Flocks of Wild Geese Flying | 기러기떼 날으네 |
| 22.2 | Female solo | Jo Kum Hwa | Are We Living like in Those Days? | 그때처럼 우리가 살고 있는가 |
| 22.3 | Female solo and female chorus | Jo Kum Hwa | Let's Protect Socialism | 사회주의 지키세 |
| 23 | Medley | Ri Kyong Suk | Ri Kyong Suk Medley | 리경숙 노래련곡 |
| 23.1 | Female solo | Ri Kyong Suk | My Mother | 나의 어머니 |
| 23.2 | Female solo and female chorus | Ri Kyong Suk | Song of Faith and Will | 신념과 의지의 찬가 |
| 23.3 | Female solo and mixed chorus | Ri Kyong Suk | Nice to Meet You | 반갑습니다 |
| 23.4 | Female solo and mixed chorus | Ri Kyong Suk | My Country is the Best | 내 나라 제일로 좋아 |

=== Part 2 ===
| | Type | Performers | English title | Korean Title |
|---|---|---|---|---|
| 24 | Light music ensemble | Wangjaesan Light Music Band | Thunder on Jong Il Peak | 정일봉의 우뢰소리 |
| 25 | Dance | Kim Son Kyong and 475 others | Without a Break | 단숨에 |
| 26 | Trumpet solo and female chorus | Pak Chol Jun | I Look at You and Think | 너를 보며 생각하네 |
| 27 | Medley | | Song Medley | 노래련곡 |
| 27.1 | Female solo | O Jong Yun | Frost Flower | 하얀 서리꽃 |
| 27.2 | Female solo | O Jong Yun | Maple Leaves Turn Scarlet | 단풍은 붉게 타네 |
| 27.3 | Female duo and female chorus | O Jong Yun, Hwang Suk Kyong | His Day | 그이의 하루 |
| 27.4 | Female trio and female chorus | O Jong Yun, Hwang Suk Kyong, Kim Sun Hui | Yearning | 간절 합니다 |
| 27.5 | Female solo | Kim Myong Ok | Filial Duty, Korea's Tradition | 효성은 조선의 가풍 |
| 27.6 | Female trio | Kim Sun Hui, Kim Myong Ok, Hwang Suk Kyong | Song of the Three Prides | 3대자랑가 |
| 27.7 | Female quartet and female chorus | Kim Sun Hui and 3 others | Socialism is Ours | 사회주의는 우리거야 |
| 27.8 | Female quintet | Hwang Suk Kyong and 4 others | Believe in Tomorrow | 래일을 믿으라 |
| 27.9 | Female quintet and female chorus | Kim Sun Hui and 4 others | Let's Love Our Motherland | 사랑하자 나의 조국 |
| 27.10 | Female solo and female chorus | Jong Myong Sin | Fog Rises Over Jong Il Peak | 정일봉에 안개 흐르네 |
| 27.11 | Female solo and female chorus | Jong Myong Sin | The General Rides a White Horse | 장군님 백마타고 달리신다 |
| 28 | Dance | Jon Kyong Hui and 12 others | Ring Dance | 륜춤 |
| 29 | Medley | | Song Medley | 노래련곡 |
| 29.1 | Female solo and female chorus | Kim Son Hui | Even Sowing Gold Can't Buy Youth | 황금을 뿌리여도 청춘은 못사 |
| 29.2 | Female trio | Kim Song Ok, Kim Ok Sun, Kim Son Hui | Mother's Eyes | 어머니 눈빛 |
| 29.3 | Female duo and female chorus | Kim Song Ok, Kim Ok Sun | Always With Us | 언제나 함게 계셨네 |
| 29.4 | Female solo and female chorus | Hwang Suk Kyong | A Wild Rose's Heart | 해당화의 마음 |
| 29.5 | Female quintet and female chorus | Hwang Suk Kyong and 4 others | Song of Coastal Artillery Women | 녀성해안포병의 노래 |
| 29.6 | Female trio | Kim Song Ok, Jong Sun Nyo, Kim Ok Sun | Thinking of Him | 그이만을 생각하네 |
| 29.7 | Female dectet | Kim Song Ok and 9 others | The General Shortens a Hundred Miles to a Span | 장군님 축지법 쓰신다 |
| 29.8 | Female quintet and female chorus | Jong Sun Nyo and 4 others | Let's Become Satellites of the Sun | 태양의 위성이 되자 |
| 30 | Tap dance | Paek Son Yong and 38 others | Dance of the Land, Air and Sea Services | 륙해공군춤 |
| 31 | Medley | Ryom Chong | Ryom Chong Medley | 렴청 노래련곡 |
| 31.1 | Female solo and female chorus | Ryom Chong | Thunder on Jong Il Peak | 정일봉의 우뢰소리 |
| 31.2 | Female solo and female chorus | Ryom Chong | Fortune of Korea | 조선의 행운 |
| 31.3 | Female solo and female chorus | Ryom Chong | We Live Entrusting Our All to Him | 하늘처럼 믿고 삽니다 |
| 32 | Female solo and mixed chorus | Ryang Un Mi | Moran Hill | 모란봉 |
| 33 | Dance | Ro Mi Song and 35 others | Fan Dance | 부체춤 |
| 34 | Kayagum duet and ensemble | Kyong Nam Chol, Kim Kwang Chol and 60 others | High Haul at the Sea | 바다 만풍가 |
| 35 | Female vocal ensemble and chorus | Kim Myong Sun and 17 others | A Sea of Apples at the Foot of Chol Pass | 철령아래 사과바다 |
| 36 | Dance and music | Hong Jong Guk and 140 others | Rich Harvest Comes to the Chongsan Plain | 청산벌에 풍년이 왔네 |
| 37 | Female quintet and mixed chorus | | Cutting Edge Breakthrough | 돌파하라 죄점던을 |
| 38 | Female solo and mixed chorus | Hwang Un Mi | Peace is on Our Bayonets | 우리의 총창우에 평화가 있다 |
| 39 | Male trio and mixed chorus | An Myong Il, Pak Yong Kon, Kwon Chong Song | Appearance of Korea | 조선의 모습 |
| 40 | Mixed chorus and orchestra | | Song in Praise of General Kim Jong Un | 김정은 장군찬가 |
| 41 | Mixed chorus and orchestra | | We Will Travel One Road Forever | 영원히 한길을 가리라 |
| 42 | Mixed chorus and orchestra | | Finale: Glory to Our Great Party | 종장: 영광을 드리자 위대한 우리 당에 |
| 43 | Mixed chorus and orchestra | | We Will Go to Mount Paektu | 가리라 백두산으로 |

== Audience ==
=== Attendance ===
People's Actress Ryom Chong (center) sings with the Wangjaesan Light Music Band

The performance "Great Party, Rosy Korea" was attended by the then President of the Presidium of the Supreme People's Assembly Kim Yong-nam (김영남) and the then Premier Pak Pong-ju (박봉주), as well as key Party and state leaders. In addition to this, many delegations from various countries, foreign ministers from international organisations and foundations, foreign ambassadors and foreign guests were all invited to the performance along with members from the General Association of Korean Residents in Japan (the Chongryon) (총련) and the chief of the Pyongyang mission of the Anti-Imperialist National Democratic Front.

=== Television ===
The performance was broadcast on the state television station Korean Central Television a week or so after the performance. The reason for this delay was most likely the fact that the concert was never carried live to TV, but, instead was edited from multiple recordings of the concert including the rehearsal and debut. Unlike the DVD version, the television broadcast was instead split into two distinct sections; separated by a question and answer segment with those who recollect memories of the history of the Party. This Q&A was hosted by narrator Kim Jong Il Prize Laureate People's Actress Paek Sung Ran (김정일상계관인 인민배우 백승란) and was most likely held during the intermission period. Following this, the interviewees perform a song.

== See also ==
- Arirang Mass Games
