= We Will Follow You Only =

North Korean propaganda hymn

Hymn
- Genre: DPRK-pop
- Length: 2:58
- Songwriters: Cha Ho Gun (차호근); Ri Ji Song (리지성)
- Composers: Kim Un Ryong (김운룡); Hwang Jin Yong (황진영)

- We Will Follow You Only
- Hangul: 우리는 당신밖에 모른다
- Hanja: 우리는 當身밖에 모른다
- RR: Urineun dangsinbakke moreunda
- MR: Urinŭn tangsinbakke morŭnda

"We Will Follow You Only" (Korean: 우리는 당신밖에 모른다) is a North Korean propaganda hymn dedicated to the country's leader Kim Jong Un. The song was first released on the Korean Central Television, right after Jang Song-thaek was arrested on December 9, 2013. People in factories and schools were required to sing the song, sometimes on camera.

== See also ==
- Music of North Korea
- North Korea's cult of personality
