= Where Are You, Dear General? =

North Korean song

Song
- Language: Korean (Munhwao)
- Released: 1971
- Length: 6:30
- Lyricist: Kim Jong Il (allegedly)

Korean name
- Hangul: 어디에 계십니까 그리운 장군님
- Hanja: 어디에 계십니까 그리운 將軍님
- RR: Eodie gyesimnikka geuriun janggunnim
- MR: Ŏdie kyesimnikka kŭriun changgunnim

"Where Are You, Dear General?" is a North Korean song, lyrics supposedly written by Kim Jong Il. Since at least 2008, the song plays through speakers of the Pyongyang Railway Station in the morning.

== History ==
The song was composed as the theme for the 1971 revolutionary opera A True Daughter of the Party (당의 참된 딸; Tangŭi ch'amtoen ttal). The song's alleged lyricist is the former Supreme Leader of North Korea Kim Jong Il. A True Daughter of the Party is set during the Korean War and features the army nurse Kang Yeon-ok (강연옥) as the protagonist. "Where Are You, Dear General?" is performed as Kang realizes that the hospital she is supposed to escort patients to has moved. In the song, Kang expresses her lifelong dream to meet her great leader and "dear general" Kim Il Sung. The pro-North Korean propaganda site DPRK Today described the song as an "immortal classic masterpiece" (불후의 고전적명작). The song became regularly performed by official choirs and popular music groups like the Pochonbo Electronic Ensemble. It is also often broadcast on North Korean television.

== Current use ==
A cover of the song by the Pochonbo Electronic Ensemble plays every morning in the North Korean capital of Pyongyang at 6 a.m. through a system of loudspeakers on the clock tower of the city's railway station. Tourists visiting Pyongyang have reported this daily occurrence since 2008. It has been assumed that the city-wide broadcast of the song serves as a morning alarm clock. However, the song was frequently played from these loudspeakers at evenings and nights too, after the clock chimes. The writer Travis Jeppesen, in his 2018 book See You Again in Pyongyang about his travels in North Korea, described the sound of "Where Are You, Dear General?" through Pyongyang's loudspeakers as that of an "antiquated synthesizer" such as a theremin. Others have described the sound as "heavily distorted and barely recognizable" from the original song.

== See also ==
- Music of North Korea
- North Korean cult of personality
