= The General Uses Warp =

North Korean propaganda song

"장군님 축지법 쓰신다"

Song
- Language: Korean
- English title: The General Uses Warp
- Published: 1996
- Composer: Kim Un Ryong
- Lyricist: Jong Ryol

- The General Uses Warp
- Hangul: 장군님 축지법 쓰신다
- Hanja: 將軍님 縮地法 쓰신다
- RR: Janggunnim chukjibeop sseusinda
- MR: Changgunnim ch'ukchipŏp ssŭsinda

"The General Uses Warp" (Korean: 장군님 축지법 쓰신다) is a North Korean song praising Kim Jong Il. The song was first released in 1996 by Wangjaesan Light Music Band, with lyrics written by Jong Ryol (정렬; 鄭烈) and music composed by Kim Un Ryong (김운룡; 金雲龍).

== Background ==
The song, released in the middle of the 1990s North Korean famine, claims that Kim Jong Il and his father Kim Il Sung could use chukjibeop, a magic ability attributed to xians, Taoist immortals, also known as suōdì in Chinese and shukuchi in Japanese. It literally means "earth-shrinking" and describes mythical techniques of rapid movement and teleportation. The story dates back to pre-war times, when a legend arose that Korean guerilla fighters, including Kim Il Sung, used this ability to escape Japanese forces during the war for independence.

This was one of many methods used to deify and exalt the leaders since the Kim Jong Il era, along with claims that Kim Jong Un can bring good weather when he travels. In 2019, however, Kim Jong Un instructed the propaganda workers to stay away from mystification of the leaders. While his father distanced himself from the public with such supernatural praise, the current supreme leader chooses to imitate his grandfather Kim Il Sung, who worked to create a friendly and relatable image.

== Reaction ==
Despite being created to praise North Korean leader Kim Jong Il, the song became an internet meme and a source of parodies in South Korea due to its absurd themes. Praising the North Korean regime is criminal under South Korean law, but the use of this song and its parodies is tolerated as it is perceived as ironic and satirical.

In 2012, when the website of the left-wing Unified Progressive Party was hacked, the hackers used this song as background music on its main page.

In 2020, the Korean Workers' Party newspaper Rodong Sinmun published a purported anecdote from 1945 in which Kim Il Sung described methods of deception he used while fighting the Japanese forces, while denying the literal existence of chukjibeop:

In fact there is nobody who disappears, and after disappearing reappears, and one can't fold the earth. It is because of active support from the popular masses that we were able to fight against heavily-armed bandits during the anti-Japanese armed struggle. If there is a "chukjibeop," it is the people's "chukjibeop."

This article was interpreted by South Korean and international media as a possible step back from the supernatural mystification of North Korea's leaders, in line with guidance that Kim Jong Un had provided a year earlier. However, the same article with minor differences was already published by the same North Korean newspaper in 2015 and again in 2018 without any media attention.

== See also ==
- Music of North Korea
- North Korean cult of personality
- North Korean leaders' trains
- Propaganda in North Korea
