= Footsteps (Ri Jong-o song) =

North Korean propaganda song

Song
- Composer: Ri Jong-o

- Footsteps
- Hangul: 발걸음
- RR: Balgeoreum
- MR: Palkŏrŭm

"Footsteps" (Korean: 발걸음) is a North Korean propaganda song dedicated for Kim Jong Un, that appeared before "Onwards Toward the Final Victory". The song was released in 2009 and aired while his father Kim Jong Il was still alive, before Kim Jong Un had a formal position. The composer is Ri Jong-o.

== Lyrics ==
External media

Audio
- "Footsteps" (mp3 at Naenara)
- "Footsteps" (instrumental) (mp3 at Naenara)

Video
- "Footsteps" (on YouTube)

The song is calling to follow "Our General Kim's footsteps". The song begins:

Tramp tramp tramp
the footsteps of our General Kim
spreading the spirit of February
tramp tramp tramping onwards

According to Yonhap, "General Kim" appears to be a reference to Kim Jong Un and February is a birth month of his father. Additional song lyrics:

Footsteps, Footsteps
spreading out further the sound of a brilliant future ahead
tramp, tramp, tramp, ah, footsteps

== See also ==
- Music of North Korea
- Propaganda in North Korea
