= Mun Kyong-jin =

North Korean musician (born 1981)

- 문경진
- Kyong-jin performing the violin
- Born: 1981; North Korea
- Disappeared: 20 August 2013
- Occupation: Violinist
- Years active: 2000-2013
- Employer: Unhasu Orchestra

Mun Kyong-jin (Korean: 문경진; born 1981) is a possibly deceased North Korean violinist who was formerly the head & first violinist of the Unhasu Orchestra.

== Career ==
Mun received numerous awards and recognitions from the North Korean government during his career. In 2005, Mun won I prize (First Prize) during the Canetti International Violin Competition in Hungary. He performed with the Unhasu Orchestra at the Salle Pleyel concert hall in Paris on March 14, 2012.

In August 2013, Mun was reported to have been arrested and executed along with the singer Hyon Song-wol and others for violating North Korea's strict rules against pornography. However, it subsequently emerged that Hyon Song-wol had not been executed because she appeared on state television a year later.
