= Chongbong Band =

North Korean light music group

- Origin: North Korea
- Genre: Light music
- Years active: 2015–present

Korean name
- Hangul: 청봉악단
- Hanja: 青峰樂團
- RR: Cheongbong akdan
- MR: Ch'ŏngbong aktan

Chongbong Band (Korean: 청봉악단) is a North Korean light music choir and orchestra. The group consists of seven members: singers and instrumentalists playing mainly brass instruments. According to KCNA, the band members are instrumentalists of the Wangjaesan Art Troupe and singers of the Moranbong Band's chorus.

The Chongbong Band was formed in late July 2015. The creation of the band has been attributed to North Korean leader Kim Jong Un. Kim's wife, former singer Ri Sol-ju, is said to have been involved in the formation of the Band. The Chongbong Band's appearance at the time that another pop group, the Moranbong Band, disappeared sparked rumors about it being a replacement for the latter. However, the Moranbong Band reappeared on 7 September 2015, a week after the Chongbong Band made its public debut in Moscow, Russia.

== History ==
=== Creation ===
The group was formed on 28 July 2015. Its creation has been attributed to Kim Jong Un. Kim's wife, Ri Sol-ju, was also involved in its creation. Chongbong Band, much like Moranbong Band also attributed to Kim Jong Un, was created to produce "music 'for the people.'"

According to South Korean media and Radio Free Asia, Chongbong Band replaced Moranbong Band whose former members disappeared from the public. Some of them reportedly left the band to get married and others were deported out of the country. Moranbong band, however, returned on 7 September 2015 to perform in a concert attended by Kim Jong Un.

=== Debut ===
In August–September 2015, the band performed with the State Merited Chorus in two concerts in Moscow, Russia: at the Tchaikovsky Concert Hall on 31 August and at the Moskvich Cultural Center on 1 September. The performances in Russia were the band's public debut. The choice of venue in Russia has been interpreted as a signal of hopes of strengthening economic ties between North Korea and Russia.

=== Other performances ===
On 11 October 2015, the band performed in the people's theater, Pyongyang on the occasion of the 70th birthday of the Workers' Party of Korea. On the 19th of the same month, the Chongbong Band performed the same concert in front of Kim Jong Un and his wife Ri Sol-ju. Also attending the concert were members and directors from the Moranbong Band, members of the State Merited Chorus, other artistes and people from Pyongyang. They performed on 1 January 2016, in a New Year's concert at the People's Palace of Culture.

=== Member ===
- People's Actress Kim Ok-Ju : Vocals
- Ri Ryu-Kyong : Vocals
- Kim Hyang-Mi : Vocals
- Yu Pong-Mi : Vocals
- Kim Song-Sim : Vocals
- Song Yong : Vocals
- Ri Su-Kyong : Vocals
- Kim Chong : Vocals
- Kim Ju-Hyang : Vocals
- Han Song-Sim : Vocals
- Ro Kyong-Mi : Vocals
- Merited Artist Kim Su-Myong : Violin
- Pek Hyon-Hui : Violin
- Pak Myong-Jin : Violin
- So Guk-Seong : Violin
- Jon Hye-Ryon : Bass
- Hwang Sung-Chol : Saxophone
- Kim Chol-Jun : Trumpet
- Kim Sun-A : Bayan
- Yo Sim : Piano
- Ri Hyok-Cheol : Drum
- Choe Hye-Rim : Percussion

== See also ==
- Music of North Korea
- List of North Korean musicians
