= Don't Ask My Name =

Popular North Korean song

Song
- Written: 1990
- Published: 1991
- Composer: Hwang Jin Yong (황진영)
- Lyricist: Ri Jeong Sul (리정술)

- Don't Ask My Name
- Chosŏn'gŭl: 내이름 묻지 마세요
- Revised Romanization: Nae-ireum mutji maseyo
- McCune–Reischauer: Nae-irŭm mutchi maseyo

"Don't Ask My Name" (Korean: 내 이름 묻지마세요) is a North Korean propaganda song. The lyrics were written by Ri Jeong-sul (리정술) and the music was composed by Hwang Jin Yong (황진영). It was released in 1991 by the Pochonbo Electronic Ensemble. Since then, various versions of the song have been played by other musical groups based in North Korea, including the Wangjaesan Light Music Band. It is quite popular and is frequently played on North Korean radio stations and television shows.

The song and music video tell of a young woman who has just achieved something great. A journalist follows her and wants her name for the newspaper. She urges him not to be concerned with her own name, but instead remember the name of the Workers' Party of Korea and all the workers who are striving to build a prosperous nation. The song was featured in the 6th episode of TV show CSI season 9.

== See also ==
- Propaganda in North Korea
