= Samjiyon Band =

North Korean classical music ensemble

- Origin: North Korea
- Genres: Classical music, NK-pop
- Years active: 2009–present
- Members: 50–60

Korean name
- Hangul: 삼지연악단
- Hanja: 三池淵樂團
- RR: Samjiyeon akdan
- MR: Samjiyŏn aktan

The Samjiyon Band (Korean: 삼지연악단) is a North Korean classical music ensemble.

The Samjiyon Band performs traditional European classical music, instrumental, percussion, and sung pieces, ranging from orchestral to solos. It has been said that calling the "band" an orchestra would be more fitting. Uncommonly for a North Korean orchestra of its kind, the Samjiyon Band is led by a woman, Ri Sune. The band is part of the umbrella organization Mansudae Art Troupe.

The history of the band began in 2009 when North Korean leader Kim Jong Il ordered the band to be formed. Later, several members of the band joined in a new Moranbong Band. When the current leader Kim Jong Un began promoting the latter band, popularity of the Samjiyon Band began to decline. While live performances of the band are numerous, it is not clear if they have ever released any records.

It is currently unknown if the band has any relation to the Samjiyon Orchestra that performed at the start of the 2018 Winter Olympics in South Korea. Multiple foreign observers, including officials from South Korea's Ministry of Unification, expect the two musical groups to be related someway.

== Naming ==
The band is named after the town of Samjiyon, Ryanggang Province near Mount Paektu that is symbolic of the Kim dynasty. In North Korean propaganda, the town is portrayed as a "sacred site of the revolution", where the founding leader Kim Il Sung won an important battle against the Japanese and where his son Kim Jong Il was born.

== History ==
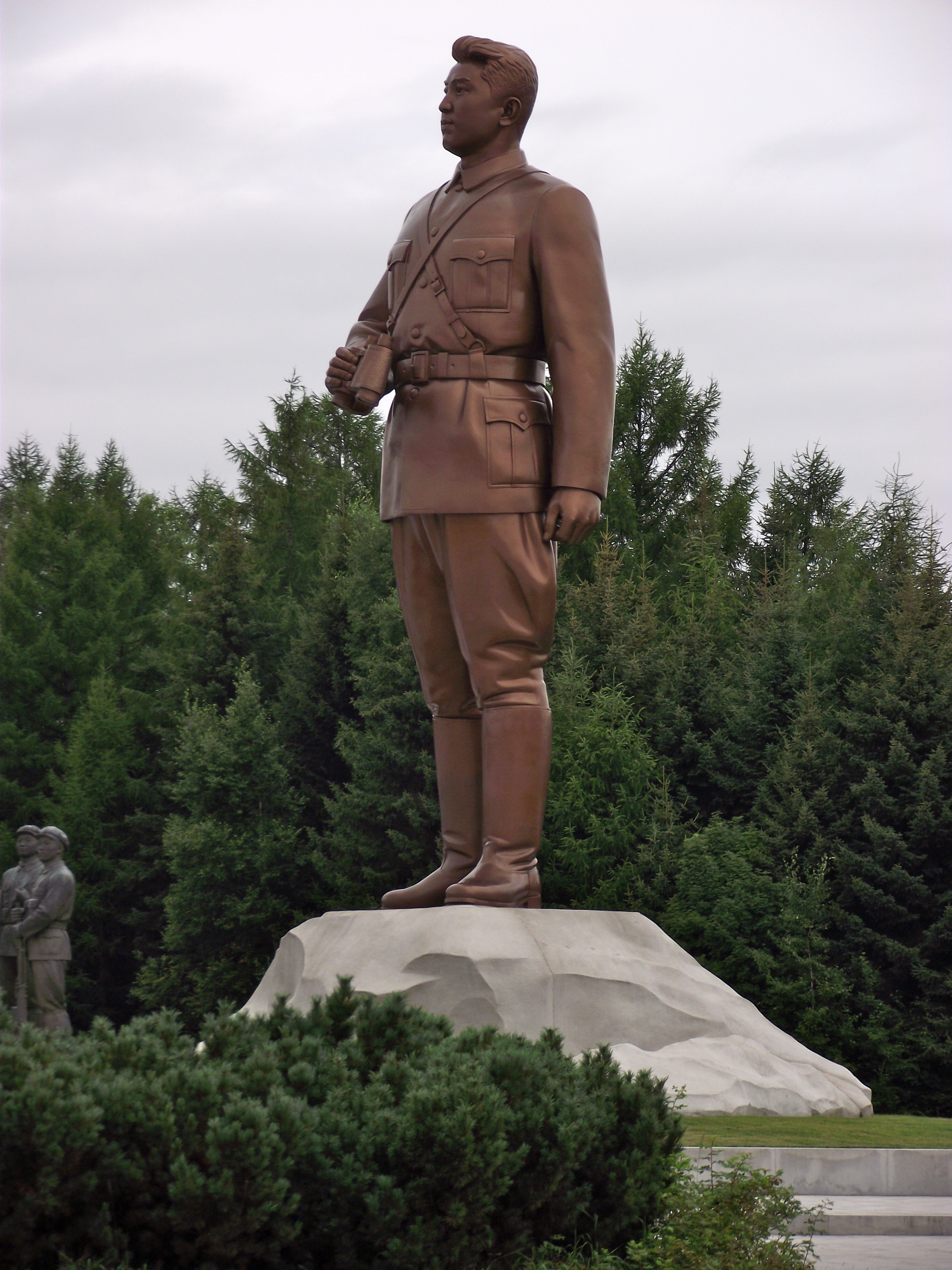
Kim Il Sung statue at Samjiyon Grand Monument in Samjiyon, the namesake of the band

The Samjiyon Band was created in January 2009 by Kim Jong Il, who had changed his policy toward musical groups since he had a stroke in 2008. The band was created from musicians of the Merited Women's Instrumental Ensemble of the Mansudae Art Troupe, an umbrella organization of North Korean artists.

The Moranbong Band was formed from members of the Samjiyon Band and debuted in 2012. The future members of the Moranbong Band had been performing together in the Samjiyon Band since at least September 2009. Previously, the Samjiyon Band was considered more sophisticated of the two by North Korean artists, but since the leader Kim Jong Un began promoting the Moranbong Band, the popularity of the Samjiyon has waned and the band has even "fallen into relative obscurity". Accordingly, a 2018 defector testimony of a performing arts graduate says: "Many beautiful 'princess-like' girls appeared in the Samjiyon Band, but typically you hear of them moving up to the Moranbong Band or Unhasu Orchestra."

In February 2018, the Orchestra performed in South Korea, marking the first time in 12 years that any North Korean Orchestra had done so.

== Band ==
The Samjiyon Band remains part of the umbrella organization Mansudae Art Troupe. The Samjiyon Band itself is a chamber orchestra of young musicians who perform mostly classical music. They perform separately from other Mansudae Art Troupe groups.

The Samjiyon Band performs traditional European classical music, instrumental, percussion, and sung pieces, ranging from orchestral to solos. They play mostly classical instruments, including wind and string instruments, such as violin, cello, harp, trumpet, trombone, clarinet, flute, and timpani, with the occasional piano, accordion, and saxophone. Although titled a "band", "[i]t would have been fair to call the Samjiyon Band an orchestra because the band [includes] cellos, violins, and other orchestral instruments", according to a defector. It sometimes performs together with foreign performers as part of cultural exchange, including a 2011 concert conducted by Pavel Ovsyannikov.

Live performances of the Samjiyon Band are numerous, including a recent performance during 2017 New Year's celebration. It is not known if the Samjiyon Band has released any records; their music is known abroad only through videos on YouTube.

=== Members ===
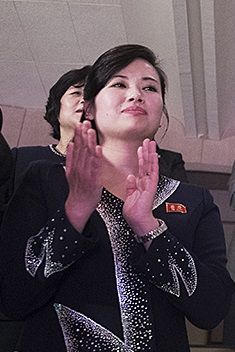
Hyon Song-wol, leader of the Samjiyon Orchestra

The band has between 50 and 60 members, "winners of national and international contests and excellent graduates from Pyongyang Kim Won Gyun Conservatory". The band members are in their 20s or 30s.

The leader of the band in 2017 was Ri Sune (리순애), a female violinist. She also conducted the band. It is rare for a North Korean orchestra of its kind to be led by a woman. In 2018 the leader of the Samjiyon Orchestra that visited South Korea was Hyon Song-wol, another female artist and lead singer of Moranbong Band.

The band members have "long elaborately arranged hair that fit well with evening dress and classical music".

Although North Korean bands routinely rotate members, some affiliations appear to be long-term. Such is the case of violinist Hong Su-kyong in the Samjiyon Band, for instance.

=== List of members of the Samjiyon Band ===
- Ri Sune (conductor, leader)
- Suno Hyang-hui (violin)
- Hong Su-kyong (violin)

== Samjiyon Orchestra ==
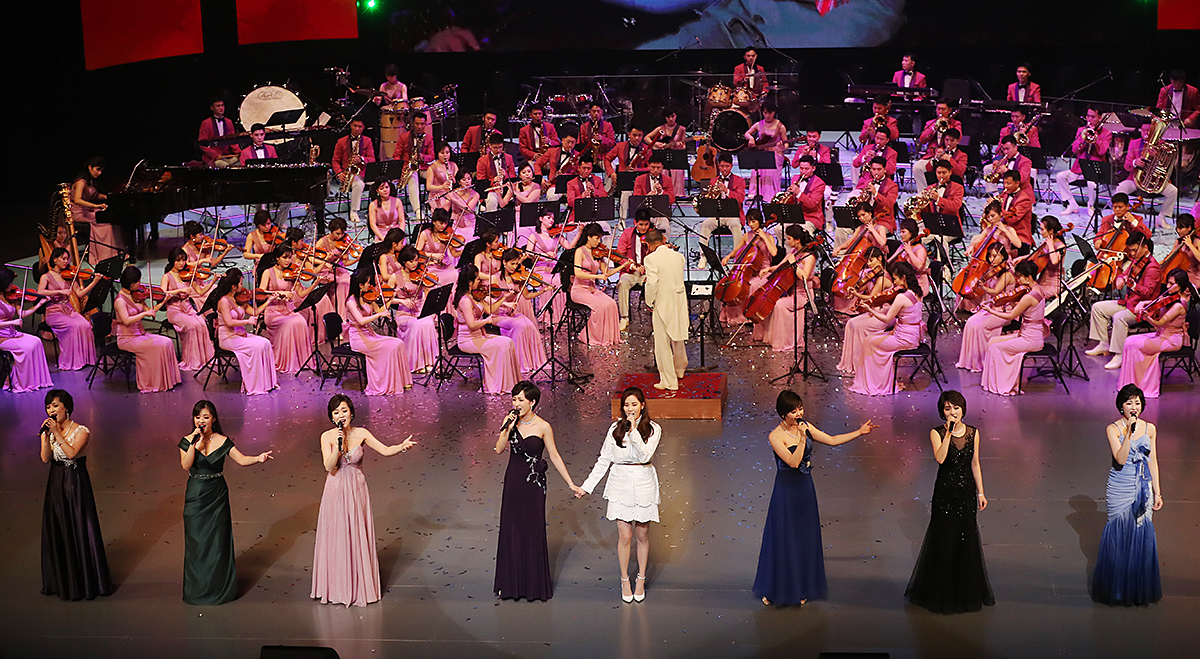
Samjiyon Orchestra performing in Seoul, South Korea on February 11, 2018. On this night, K-pop girl group Girls' Generation member Seohyun surprised the audience by making an appearance on the stage.

The Samjiyon Band is possibly distinct from the Samjiyon Orchestra, but the two groups seem to be closely related.

The Samjiyon Orchestra was hastily founded ahead of inter-Korean high-level talks concerning North Korea's participation in the 2018 Winter Olympics in South Korea for the purpose of performing during the Games. The Orchestra performed in the South at the start of the Games. Two months later, the Samjiyon Orchestra performed in Pyongyang together with South Korean musicians in the Spring is Coming concert tour that brought together artists from both countries.

The orchestra might be formed from members of the original Samjiyon Band, with additional members. This opinion is shared by multiple observers, including the South Korean Ministry of Unification, and defectors familiar with the cultural circles. Jeon Young-sun of the Institute of the Humanities for Unification at the Konkuk University points out that because North Korean groups are under government control, it is easy to reorganize them keeping some of the original elements and adding new ones on an ad hoc basis.

=== List of members of the Samjiyon Orchestra ===
- Hyon Song-wol (leader)

== See also ==
- Unhasu Orchestra
- Music of North Korea
- List of North Korean musicians
