= Mokran Kwangmyong Co. =

North Korean recording company

- Founded: December 1992; 33 years ago
- Headquarters: Pyongyang, North Korea
- Owner: Kim Il Sung
- Parent: Government of North Korea

Mokran Video (Chosŏn'gŭl: 목란 비데오; Mongnan Pideo; lit. "Magnolia Video") is a North Korean recording and distribution company founded in December 1992. The company holds the copyright to all North Korean audiovisual works and is responsible for their distributions and sales, in addition to the distribution of international content within the country.

Mokran Video was founded in December 1992, under the organization of Kim Il Sung, the company was responsible for producing all media content in the country, the most popular being works of scenic art such as music and films.

In the 2000s, foreign languages for children and teenagers, educational DVDs, and media containing the country's recent economic and technological achievements were introduced. In May 2006, under the direction of Kim Jong-il, a new Mokran Video factory was opened. This factory automated much of the process, allowing the country to produce thousands of media daily. They sell the movies in stalls. In 2012, there were around 50 Mokran Video outlets in Pyongyang.
