= Whistle (North Korean song) =

North Korean popular song

Song
- Composer: Ri Jong-o (리종오)
- Lyricist: Cho Ki-chon (조기천)

- Whistle
- Hangul: 휘파람
- RR: Hwiparam
- MR: Hwip'aram

"Whistle" (Korean: 휘파람) is a North Korean song. The music was composed by Ri Jong-o (리종오) and the lyrics were adopted from a poem by national poet Cho Ki-chon (조기천). It was released in 1990 by the Pochonbo Electronic Ensemble, and as a single on vinyl in 1991. After its release, it became one of the biggest hits in North Korea.

The song has also become popular in South Korea, where it is considered to be free of ideology due to its depiction of a love affair between a man and a woman. Its main subject is a man wooing a textile factory worker by whistling regularly at her balcony.

During the 2018 Winter Olympics in Pyeongchang, the song was performed by a troupe of 230 North Korean cheerleaders invited by South Korea in order to help improve diplomatic relations and restore normalized communications.
