= Unhasu Orchestra =

2009–2013 North Korean music group

Unhasu Orchestra 은하수관현악단
- Origin: North Korea
- Genres: Classical music; Folk music; Traditional Korean music
- Years active: 2009-2013

Korean name
- Hangul: 은하수관현악단
- Hanja: 銀河水管絃樂團
- RR: Eunhasu gwanhyeonakdan
- MR: Ŭnhasu kwanhyŏnaktan

The Unhasu (Milky Way) Orchestra (Korean: 은하수관현악단) was a musical group based in Pyongyang, North Korea. It performed primarily with Western instruments, sometimes performing alongside traditional Korean soloists. The orchestra has a concert hall, the Unhasu Theater in Pyongyang, dedicated for its use. Ri Sol Ju, the wife of Kim Jong Un, was a former singer in this group. According to ex-North Korean diplomat Thae Yong-ho, the orchestra was disbanded on 12 August 2013.

== Performances ==
On 14 March 2012, the South Korean conductor Myung-whun Chung led the combined orchestras of Unhasu Orchestra and the Radio France Philharmonic in the Salle Pleyel concert hall in Paris, France. The pan-Korean folk song called "Arirang" was played.

== Rumored executions and alleged disbandment ==
On August 29, 2013, The Chosun Ilbo reported, based on anonymous sources in China, that key members of the Moranbong Band and Unhasu Orchestra were made to watch the execution by firing squad of certain members of the Unhasu Orchestra, including violinist Mun Kyong-jin, members of the Wangjaesan Light Music Band, and the singer Hyon Song-wol (since seen alive on NK television in 2014), on the orders of Kim Jong Un. According to the Chosun Ilbo report, the Unhasu Orchestra was then disbanded. The executed members of the band have been named by the music journalist Norman Lebrecht as the concertmasters Moon, Gyeong-Jin, and Jung, Sun-Young. Other reporters are skeptical of The Chosun Ilbo report, such as Chad O'Carroll of NK News, a North Korean analyst website. O'Carroll told Business Insider, "You've got to remember that a lot of the time the source is South Korean and it's in their interest to distort or perhaps weave the truth every now and then." John Delury from the Yonsei University in Seoul, told The Guardian, "This stuff gets planted regularly in media outlets and then quickly goes viral. There's a global appetite for any North Korea story and the more salacious the better. Some of it is probably true – but a great deal of it is probably not." Delury also added: "The normal standards of journalism are thrown out of the window because the attitude is: 'It's North Korea – no one knows what's going on in there.'" Hyon Song-wol, the focus of many of the reports, was later shown to be alive and well.

Alejandro Cao de Benós said that the news was false and the orchestra would perform on September 9, 2013. However, the orchestra were not present at the Day of the Foundation of the Republic celebrations on September 9, being replaced by the Korean People's Internal Security Forces Song and Dance Ensemble, leading to further speculation and concern about the fate of Unhasu Orchestra members.

Nam Jae-joon, the chief of the South Korean National Intelligence Service (NIS), said, on 8 October 2013, he was aware that "about 10 members of the Unhasu Orchestra were executed for involvement in the scandal."

A performance by the orchestra was broadcast by North Korean radio in October 2013.

Rumors of executions resurfaced in 2015 when South Korean lawmaker Shin Kyung-min revealed NIS' findings on recent executions. According to NIS, four top members of the orchestra were executed in March 2015 for spying for South Korea. Among them was the unnamed director general of the orchestra who was identified as a "Russian-trained composer and producer in his late 60s who came from Japan's pro-North Korean community". According to one of NIS' sources, the four were stripped naked before they were executed with machine gun fire. The execution took place in Pyongyang and four to five hundred members of Pyongyang's artistic community were forced to witness it. The execution was described as unusual with respect to both its cruelty and the fact that the families of those who were executed were reportedly spared from repercussions.

=== Former members ===
- Mun Kyong-jin – concertmaster
- Ri Sol-ju – singer, wife of Kim Jong-Un

== See also ==
- Media coverage of North Korea
- List of North Korean musicians
- List of South Korean musicians
- Music of North Korea
- Pochonbo Electronic Ensemble
- Wangjaesan Light Music Band
