= Moranbong Band =

North Korean girl group

- Origin: North Korea
- Genres: North Korean pop; fusion; rock; trot
- Years active: 2012–present
- Members: Kim Hyang Sun (김향순); Kang Phyong Hui (강평희); Ri Sol Ran (리설란); Ri Yun Hui (리윤희); Son-u Hyang-hui (선우향희)

Korean name
- Chosŏn'gŭl: 모란봉악단
- Hancha: 牡丹峰樂團
- Revised Romanization: Moranbong akdan
- McCune–Reischauer: Moranbong aktan

The Moranbong Band (Korean: 모란봉악단; MR: Moranbong aktan, lit. 'Tree Peony Peak Band'), also known as the Moran Hill Orchestra, is a North Korean girl group. Performing interpretive styles of pop, rock, and fusion, they are the first all-female band from the DPRK, and made their world debut on July 6, 2012. Their varied musical style has been described as symphonic because it is "putting together different kinds of sounds, and ending in a harmonious, pleasing result."

The band has been referred to in the West as "North Korea's version of the Spice Girls". They have also been noted for providing a "fascinating glimpse of what contemporary North Korean culture is like".

== History ==
The need for a modern pop band in North Korea has been attributed, by Korhonen (2014) and Cathcart et al. (2014), to the government's necessity to please important social strata: Pyongyang elites, military and technical professionals, women, and in particular, young people. The existence of the band suggests the acceptability of fashion items such as mini-skirts and high heels for women, and their short hairstyles have become popular among middle-class Pyongyang girls. The band quickly became a cultural symbol of limited openness to Western influences to the young of North Korea. In addition to the targeted elite groups, the band's exposure has concerned virtually the whole population with TV sets.

The founding of the new, more modern band can be seen as an acknowledgement that several other light-music bands, such as the Wangjaesan Light Music Band and Pochonbo Electronic Ensemble, have gone out of fashion. Features of the Moranbong Band suggest that it is a response to the success of South Korean hallyu, Korean Wave, of contemporary pop music. Sherri L. Ter Molen goes on to say that the band's debut roughly coinciding with the release of Korean Wave star Psy's "Gangnam Style" was not incidental. With the advent of the Moranbong Band, groups created by Kim Jong Il have diminished in importance. The Unhasu Orchestra has disappeared and the Sea of Blood Opera Company demoted.

According to KCNA, "Kim Jong Un organized the Moranbong band as required by the new century, prompted by a grandiose plan to bring about a dramatic turn in the field of literature and arts this year in which a new century of Juche Korea begins".

The band was set up to perform regular televised concerts as entertainment.

== Concerts ==
The band debuted on 6 July 2012. Their first performance featured Western popular culture imagery and music, including Disney characters Mickey and Minnie Mouse and Snow White, Winnie the Pooh, the "Theme from Rocky" and Frank Sinatra's "My Way". Other Western music included "Czardas", "Zigeunerweisen", "La Reine de Saba", "Menuet", "Penelope", and "Serenade de l'Étoile", as well as "The Duel", described as "a popular song"; '"Victory", introduced as "a rap song"; and "Dallas": "a country music selection". Twelve cartoon film scores were also presented in a piece called "The Collection of World Fairy Tale Songs". Kim Jong Un's wife, Ri Sol-ju, made her first public appearance in the audience. According to Cathcart (2014), these two novel policies — openly celebrating Western popular culture and publicly acknowledging the leader's spouse, along with considerable coverage of the event in the West — is thought to have served Kim's agenda. The event allowed Kim to flaunt openness while not making any substantial promises about changes in policy. As the debut was also officially set up to inspire textile workers, it can be seen as carrying a message of improvement of living-standards. As South Korean media raised questions about a fundamental opening up of North Korea's culture being foreshadowed by the concert, North Korea responded that "there would be no such policy shift as expected by enemy countries", and that the performance followed Kim Jong Il's maxim to "plant feet in our land, and lift eyes to see the world."

Since its debut, the band's Western-inspired look has been toned down considerably. The band's second appearance, at a Korean War commemoration, acted as a reminder that the exceptional repertoire of the debut was not a complete shift in North Korean cultural policy. In August 2013, the band disappeared from public in midst of rumors of a purge of classical musicians in Pyongyang. When the band returned after four months, they performed alongside the State Merited Orchestra and Chorus that Cathcart (2014) calls "heavily orthodox." Differences in style are highlighted by the joint performance of Moranbong Band's arrangement of "Without a Break", originally a military march, the rhythm of which the State Merited Orchestra and Chorus had trouble maintaining. During the 2013 New Years concert, at the end of the song "Without a Break" videos are shown behind the band of nuclear missiles being launched and destroying the United States of America and the crowd stands and cheers during the launch and subsequent destruction of the U.S. In the first of the two joint concerts, the State Merited Orchestra and Chorus dominated. However, by the second concert the Moranbong Band was again the more prominent one.

The band just several months old raised its curtain for its significant demonstration performance proclaiming its birth before the world." The repertoire of the performance divided into two parts included colorful numbers such as light music "Arirang", female vocal quintet "Let's Learn(배우자)", light music "Yeppuni(예쁜이)", light music and song "Victors(승리자들)", female trio "Silk Weaving Girl of Nyongbyon(녕변의 비단처녀)", string quartet "We Can't Live without his Care(그 품 떠나 못살아)", foreign light music "Chardash", "Victory", "Song of Gypsy", female sextet "Fluttering Red Flag(붉은기 펄펄)" and light music and song "Suite of World Fable Songs". The July 7, 2012 audience was composed of Choe Ryong-hae, Jang Song-thaek, Kim Ki-nam, Hyon Chol-hae, Kim Yang-gon, Kim Yong-il, Kim Phyong-hae, Choe Pu-il, Kim Myong-guk, Kim Yong-chol, Jo Kyong-chol and "officials, creators, artists, writers and journalists of literary and art, media and art educational institutions".

On April 7 or 28, 2015, the Moranbong Band performed for the first time in nine months. The concert marked the last public appearance of Minister of People's Armed Forces Hyon Yong-chol before his apparent purge later that month. Band leader Sonu Hyang-hui was also absent from the band's ranks despite the performance featuring highly technical instrumental pieces. The songs performed were noticeably non-political and influenced by Western popular music leading Adam Catchart to conclude that the performance was "uncomfortably approximate to the nightclub experience". However, the band also sported a new song directly in praise of Kim Jong Un: "We Will Go to Mount Paektu" (Korean: 가리라 백두산으로).

From July 15 until September 7, 2015, the band was not seen in public or live on television sparking rumours that they had disbanded or 'disappeared' and been replaced by the Chongbong Band. However, on September 7, the band performed in front of a state delegation from Cuba together with the State Merited Chorus in Pyongyang, including the popular North Korean song "Pyongyang Is Best" and "Guantanamera" for their Cuban audience, quashing these rumours.

In December 2015, Kim Jong Un sent the band to perform in a series of shows in Beijing to improve relations between China and North Korea; these would have been the band's first performances outside of North Korea. However, the band left Beijing on a scheduled flight to Pyongyang only a few hours before their performance was scheduled. China's Xinhua news agency stated that all of the band's performances had been cancelled due to "communication issues at the working level". The Korea Herald reported that North Korea had cancelled the tour because China had requested that North Korea's missiles should not be shown during performances.

The band performed in a concert in Pyongyang, celebrating the start of 2019, without previous band leader Hyon Song-wol.

On July 27, 2023, for the first time in 3 years, multiple singers from the Moranbong Band made an appearance during the 'Grand Performance to Celebrate 70th Anniversary of Great War Victory' concert.

== Performances ==
The Moranbong Band has brought forth many propaganda songs in praise of Kim Jong Un, many of which feature Songun, or military-first, themed lyrics, and music videos. In one video they show a nuclear missile being launched and exploding over and destroying the United States. Another song promotes attacking South Korea. The DPRK's official newspaper, Rodong Sinmun, printed full notation of such songs on its first page as a signal for service people of the Korean People's Army to memorize the tunes and lyrics. The drastic changes of key in the musical composition of the songs has been interpreted to carry a message "that rapid change is coming, and things may end very differently than where they began".

== Membership ==
The Moranbong Band consists of only women. In contrast to South Korean girl bands, the members of the Moranbong Band play their own instruments. Due to North Korean musical education aspiring for precision and accuracy, their playing abilities are described as "very accomplished and tight". The large number of members has enabled them to play a variety of different styles of music as well as some technically challenging arrangements. Changes in the lineup have not changed the musical style of the band, suggesting that members are swapped because of their technical ability rather than artistic input. Members of the band hold ranks in the military and, with the exception of the debut, have appeared in public in uniforms and with insignia. Thus the band is in fact a "military orchestra" instead of a "pop band". After the debut, the extravagance of the clothes and jewelry was toned down, hairstyles shortened, and the band members reportedly were placed on a diet to make them appear uniform in size.

As of May 2013, the band's lineup was as follows.

=== Members ===
- Sonu Hyang-hui (선우향희) – Violin and Band Leader
- Hong Su Kyong (홍수경) – Violin
- Cha Yong Mi (차영미) – Violin
- Kim Un-Ha – Violin
- Yu Un Jong (유은정) – Cello
- Ri Hui Kyong (리희경) – Synthesizer
- Kim Hyang Sun (김향선) – Synthesizer
- Kim Yong-Mi – Piano & Synthesizer
- Choe Jong Im (최정임) – Saxophone, Clarinet & Percussion
- Sonu Jang-Hyok – Saxophone
- Kim Jong Mi (김정미) – Piano
- Ri Yun-Hui – Drums
- Han Sun Jong (한순정) – Drums
- Kang Ryong Hui (강령희) – Guitarist
- Jo Kyong-Hui – Guitarist
- Ri Sol-Lan – Bass
- Jon Hye Ryon (전혜련) – Bass
- Merited Artist Kim Yu Kyong (김유경)- Vocals
- Merited Artist Kim Sol Mi (김설미) – Vocals
- Merited Artist Ryu Jin A (류진아) – Vocals
- Pak Mi Kyong (박미경) – Vocals
- Jong Su Hyang (정수향) – Vocals
- Pak Son Hyang (박선향) – Vocals
- Merited Artist Ra Yu Mi (라유미) – Vocals
- Ri Su Kyong (리수경) – Vocals
- Ri Myong Hui (리명희) – Vocals
- Merited Artist Ri Ok-Hwa – Vocals
- Jo Guk-Hyang – Vocals
- Kim Hyo-Sim – Vocals
- Yu Pong-Mi – Vocals
- Kim Chong-Ye – Vocals
- People's Actress Kim Ok-Ju – Vocals

In 2017 Hyon Song-wol (현송월), the leader of the band, was appointed to the Central Committee of the Workers' Party. In 2018, she led a four-person team which visited South Korea to discuss arrangements for the Winter Olympics.

Veteran Pochonbo Electronic Ensemble composer and Merited Artist Hwang Jin Yong (황진영 (1959년)) also served as vice-director for the band until his death on 24 January 2025.

== Reception ==
The band is immensely popular in North Korea, and visitors to the country have reported people dancing to Moranbong Band's songs in the streets and shops closing during television performances.

One reviewer said, "The Moranbong girls are not what you'd expect from an unfashionably totalitarian regime where grey is the new grey. Their skirts are short, the hair is trendy, the music danceable. It could just about pass as a Eurovision entry from Azerbaijan."

Another reviewer said, "We must take care, however, not to see these talented performers dressed in flashy costume as new archetypes for the New Modern Woman in the DPRK. According to Nicola Dibben's theorizing of the female representation in popular music, "It would be hopelessly naïve to declare that such tactics are exclusively empowering in their influence." Rather, the gender division of the performance as a whole—from the stage through the audience space—should be examined for context."

A third commentator said, "If state propaganda is to be believed, the Moranbong Band's first performance was also meant to stimulate production in the textile sector, an important node of which Kim Jong Un and his female companion had visited the day before the ensemble's premiere in Pyongyang ... Consider the jewelry line-up on the Moranbong singers..."

Another commentator said, "If a candidate exists that might represent the edge of a possible NK-pop invasion, it is surely the Moranbong Band, which debuted at a concert for Kim Jong Un in July 2012—not incidentally, the same month in which Psy's "Gangnam Style" was released."

== See also ==
- Music of North Korea
- List of North Korean musicians
- Three Girls Revitalizing Asia
