= Pochonbo Electronic Ensemble =

North Korean orchestra

- Logo of the Pochonbo Electronic Ensemble

Background information
- Origin: North Korea (DPRK)
- Genres: Electronic folk, popular music, and revolutionary
- Years active: 1985–2015
- Labels: Kwangmyong Music Company, Mokran Video

Korean name
- Hangul: 보천보전자악단
- Hanja: 普天堡電子樂團
- RR: Bocheonbo jeonja akdan
- MR: Poch'ŏnbo chŏnja aktan

The Pochonbo Electronic Ensemble (Korean: 보천보전자악단) was an orchestra from North Korea (DPRK). It is famous for its performances of revolutionary and folk songs, as well as some covers of pop songs in the West, including "Brother Louie" by Modern Talking and "One Way Ticket". They have been reported to be one of the country's most popular groups.

The Pochonbo Electronic Ensemble can be heard on North Korean radio stations and is broadcast on state television. A total of 182 volumes (186 CDs) were released (due to the re-release of volumes 13–16 in the 1990s).

== History ==
The group was formed on 4 June 1985 from the electronic music section of the Mansudae Art Troupe, becoming the first electronic pop group in the country. Until 1992, the band was originally known as the Pochonbo Light Music Band. The group takes its name from the Battle of Pochonbo on 4 June 1937, when a guerrilla unit under the leadership of Kim Il-sung attacked compounds of the Japanese occupation force in Pochonbo.

In 1991, the ensemble traveled to Japan to perform as part of a cultural exchange between North Korea and Japan.

== Known members ==
- Hyon Song Wol (born 1976) – vocals (People's Artist)
- Ri Kyong Suk (born 1970) – vocals (People's Artist)
- Kim Kwang Suk (1964–2018) – vocals (People's Artist)
- Ri Pun Hui (born 1972) – vocals (People's Artist)
- Jo Kum Hwa (born 1970) – vocals (People's Artist)
- Chon Hye Yong (born 1972) – vocals (People's Artist)
- Kim Jong Nyo (born 1975) – vocals (People's Artist)
- Yun Hye Young (born 1977) – vocals (People's Artist)
- Kim Won-il (Edited out from concerts re-released around 2009, and not mentioned as a member since then) – synthesizers (Merited Artist)
- Kim Hae-song – synthesizers (Merited Artist)
- Kim Mun-hyok – synthesizers (Merited Artist)
- Kwon Kyong-hak – synthesizers (Merited Artist)
- Kim Song-ryop – synthesizers (Merited Artist)
- Jon Kwon – piano (Merited Artist)
- Jang Jong-won – piano (Merited Artist)
- Ri Mun – electronic organ (Merited Artist)
- Kang Chol-ho – electronic organ (Merited Artist)
- Kang Gum-chol – electronic organ (Merited Artist)
- Park Ui-hyon – guitar (Merited Artist)
- Song Kwang – guitar (Merited Artist)
- Choe Yong-chol – guitar (Merited Artist)
- Kim Yong-il – bass guitar (Merited Artist)
- Choe Mun-chol – drums (Merited Artist)
- Kim Jin (missing from footage filmed 2015, status as a member is unknown) – percussion (Merited Artist)
- Kim Yeon-su – conductor (Merited Artist)
- Ri Jong-o (1943–2016) – conductor, major composer (People's Artist, Labour Hero, Order of Kim Il Sung and Kim Il Sung Prize Winner)
- Hwang Jin Yong (1959–2025) – major composer (People's Artist, Labour Hero, Kim Il Sung Prize Winner)

== See also ==
- List of North Korean musicians
- Music of North Korea
- Traditional music of Korea
- Unhasu Orchestra
- Wangjaesan Light Music Band
- Moranbong Band
