= Wangjaesan Light Music Band =

North Korean popular music group

- The band's insignia features a saxophone and a Kimjongilia bloom.

Background information
- Origin: Pyongyang, North Korea
- Genres: Dance music, Light music, folk and traditional music, popular music (North Korean)
- Years active: 1983-present

Korean name
- Chosŏn'gŭl: 왕재산 경음악단
- Hancha: 旺載山輕音樂團 / 王在山輕音樂團
- Revised Romanization: Wangjaesan Gyeongeumakdan
- McCune–Reischauer: Wangjaesan Kyŏngŭmaktan

The Wangjaesan Light Music Band (Korean: 왕재산 경음악단; MR: Wangjaesan Kyŏngŭmaktan) is a light music (kyŏngŭmak) group in North Korea. It is one of two (with Pochonbo Electronic Ensemble) popular music groups that were established by North Korea in the 1980s, both named after places where Kim Il Sung fought the Japanese in 1930s. It takes its name from Mount Wangjae in Onsong-gun, North Hamgyong Province, on the border with China (Japan puppet state Manchukuo in that period), where Kim Il Sung is said to have held a meeting for anti-Japanese activities in 1933.

The band was established by the North Korean leader Kim Jong Il, son and heir of Kim Il Sung, on 22 July 1983. Its music was often broadcast over Korean Central Broadcasting Station channels such as Radio Pyongyang and as test card music for Korean Central Television. The Wangjaesan Dance Troupe is part of the group.

== Alleged executions and disbandment ==
On 29 August 2013, The Chosun Ilbo reported that key members of the Wangjaesan Light Music Band were made to watch the execution by firing squad of other musicians and dancers from their band, as well as members of the Unhasu Orchestra and the singer Hyon Song-wol, on the orders of Kim Jong Un. The Wangjaesan Light Music Band was subsequently disbanded. Some experts however were dubious of this claim, such as Barbara Demick, author of Nothing to Envy. Demick told Business Insider "...it is hard to trust this stuff. A lot of deliberate misinformation out there." Chad O'Carroll of NK News, a North Korean analyst website, stated: "You've got to remember that a lot of the time the source is South Korean and it's in their interest to distort or perhaps weave the truth every now and then". John Delury from the Yonsei University in Seoul told The Guardian: "This stuff gets planted regularly in media outlets and then quickly goes viral. There's a global appetite for any North Korea story and the more salacious the better. Some of it is probably true — but a great deal of it is probably not". Delury also added: "The normal standards of journalism are thrown out of the window because the attitude is: 'It's North Korea — no one knows what's going on in there'". Hyon Song-wol was later shown to be alive.

The South Korean reports came approximately a month after the Workers' Party of Korea Central Committee had issued a message of anniversary congratulations to the troupe.

== Reappearance ==
In 2015, the band reunited for the "Songs Full of Memories" concert series (February–March) and the joint performance "Great Party, Rosy Korea" in October.

== Members ==
=== Singers ===
- People's Actress Ryom Chong
- Merited Actress Pak Bok Hui
- Hyon Song Wol
- Choe Gwang-Ho
- Choe Ok-Suk
- Ha Yong-Ae
- Han Sol-Hyang
- Han Un-Jong
- Hwang Suk-Gyong
- Jang Mu-Gil
- Jang Jong-Ae
- Jang Yon-Hui
- Jong Chun-Hoi
- Jong Myong-Sik
- Jong Myong-Sin
- Jong Sun-Nyo
- Kang Yun-Hui
- Kih Myong-Ok
- Kim Hui-Ok
- Kim Hwa-Suk
- Kim Jong-Nyo
- Kim Mi-Suk
- Kim Ok-Sun
- Kim Song-Ok
- Kim Sun-Hui
- Ko Gyong-Ran
- Kwon Mi-Hwa
- O Jong-Yun
- Om Jong-Nyo
- On Chun-Sil
- Pak in-Ok
- Ri Hyon Suk
- Ri Hyon-Kyong
- Ri Ok-Hwa
- Ri Pom-Sun
- Ro Hyang-Suk
- Ryom Tong-Son
- So Un-Hyang
- Yun Hye-Yong

=== Musicians ===
- Merited Artist Choe Mun Ho, conductor
- Merited Actor Pak Chol Jun, trumpet
- Jang Mu Kil, brass
- Pak In Thae, trumpet
- Ko Hwa Son, guitar
- Jon Il, violin
- Pak Man Chol, alto saxophone
- Choe Hwi Thae, saxophone
- Kim Yong Ran, electric guitar

== See also ==
- List of North Korean musicians
- List of South Korean musicians
- Music of North Korea
- Moranbong Band
- Pochonbo Electronic Ensemble
- Unhasu Orchestra
