= Althea (disambiguation) =

Althea is a female given name.

Althea may also refer to:

- Althea, shrub althea, shrub althaea and rose of althea, common names for Hibiscus syriacus, an ornamental plant that is South Korea's national flower
- Althea, Missouri, United States, a ghost town
- Althea Racing, Italian-based motorcycle road racing team
- Operation Althea, a European Union military operation in Bosnia and Herzegovina
- "Althea" (song), a song by Grateful Dead
- Althea, a fictional pulsar from the science-fiction novel The Hercules Text by Jack McDevitt

== Ships ==
- Althea (1801 ship), a British merchantman launched in 1802 at Calcutta, wrecked in 1812
- USS Althea (1863), a tugboat that served during the American Civil War
- USS Althea (SP-218), a motorboat built in 1907

== See also ==
- Althaea (disambiguation)
- Altea (disambiguation)
