= USS Althea =

Three ships of the United States Navy have been named Althea, after a shrub of the mallow family; the rose of sharon or a hollyhock.

- USS Althea (1862) was a collier that served during the Civil War.
- USS Althea (1863) was a tugboat that served during the Civil War.
- USS Althea (SP-218) was a motorboat built in 1907.
