= National symbols of Korea =

National symbols of Korea may refer to:

- National symbols of North Korea
- National symbols of South Korea
