= Altea (disambiguation) =

Altea is a town in the Alicante province of eastern Spain.

Altea may also refer to:

== People ==
- Altea (given name)
- Altea (surname)

== Organizations ==
- Balonmano Altea, a handball team based in Altea, Alicante, Spain
- Unión Deportiva Altea, a Spanish football team based in Altea, in the Valencian Community

== Other uses ==
- SEAT Altea, a compact MPV from Spanish automaker SEAT, named after the town
- ALTEA, a program to measure the exposure of crewmembers to cosmic radiation aboard the International Space Station
- Altea (a.k.a. Aritia), a kingdom on the fictional continent of Akaneia in the Fire Emblem game series
- Altea, a fictional planet from the Japanese anime Beast King GoLion, and later the Netflix produced reboot series Voltron: Legendary Defender
- Altéa, a technology platform by Amadeus IT Group for airlines reservation, inventory and departure control
- MV Altea, a ship used for training Customs Officers in Liverpool, England
- Nervures Altea, a French paraglider design

== See also ==
- Althaea (disambiguation)
- Althea (disambiguation)
