= National symbols of North Korea =

- Flag of North Korea

- Emblem: Emblem of North Korea
- Anthem: "Aegukka"
- Song: "Arirang"
- Language: Korean
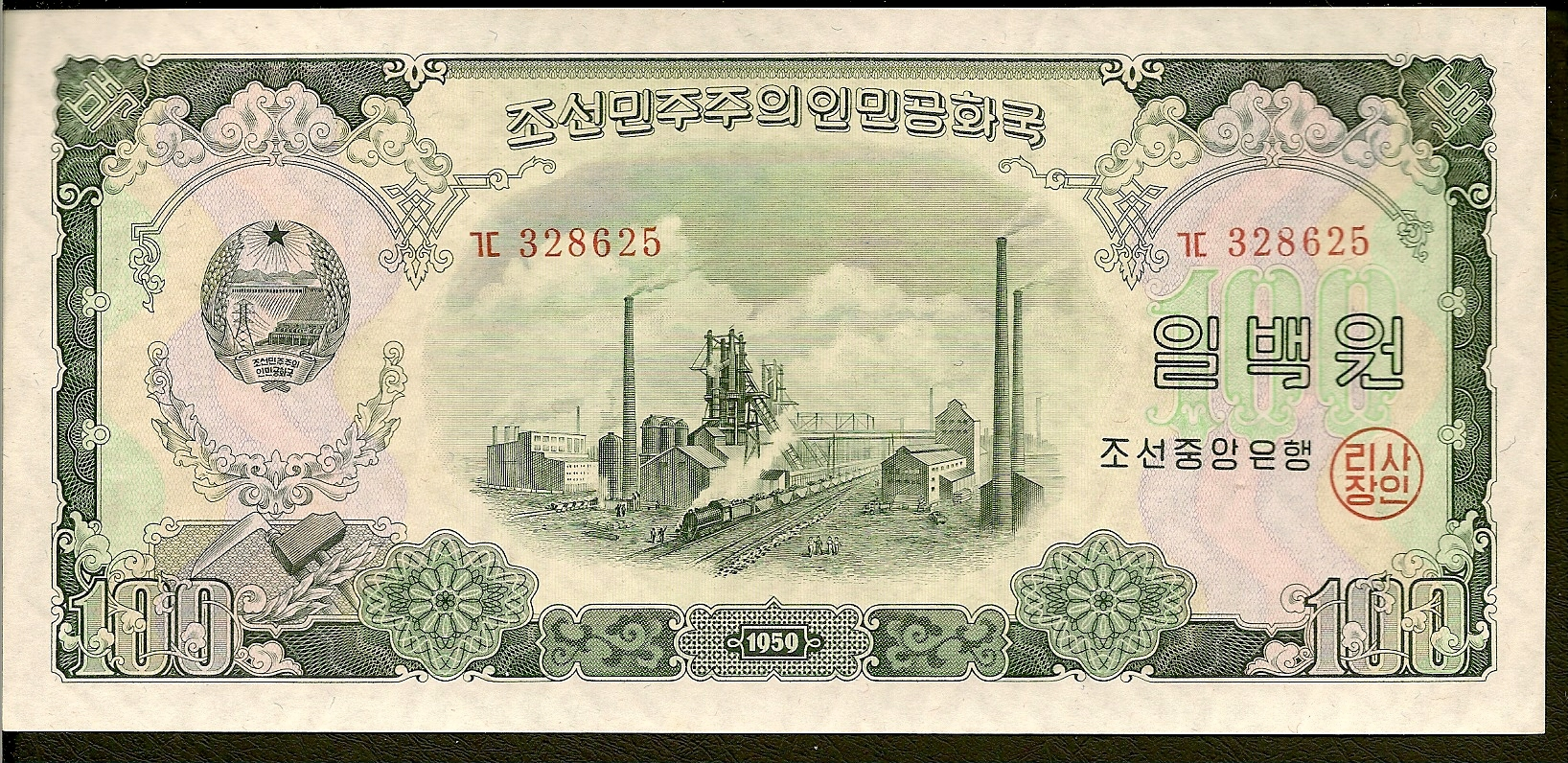
- Currency: North Korean won
- Calendar: North Korean calendar

Living insignia
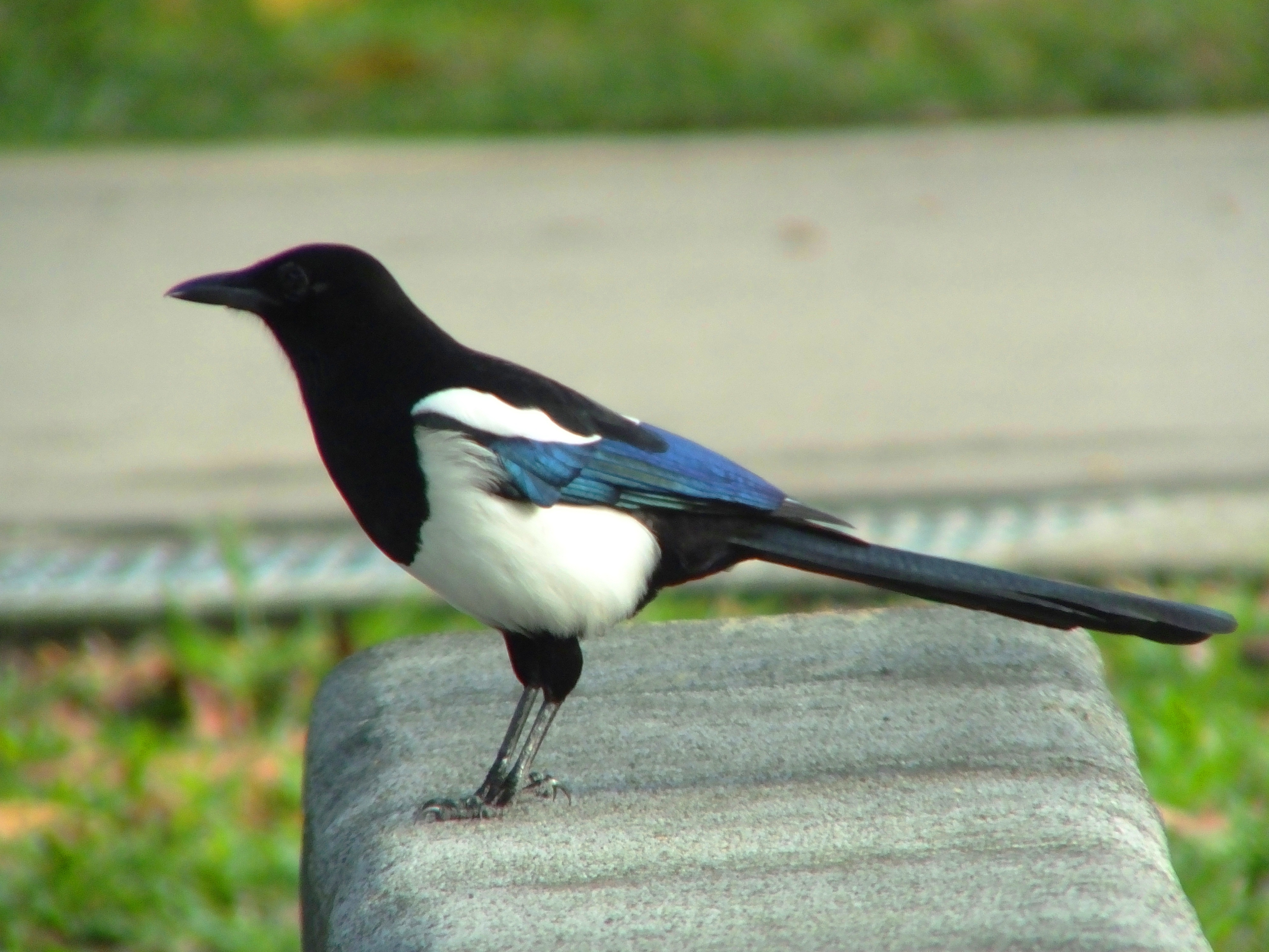
- Bird: Korean magpie

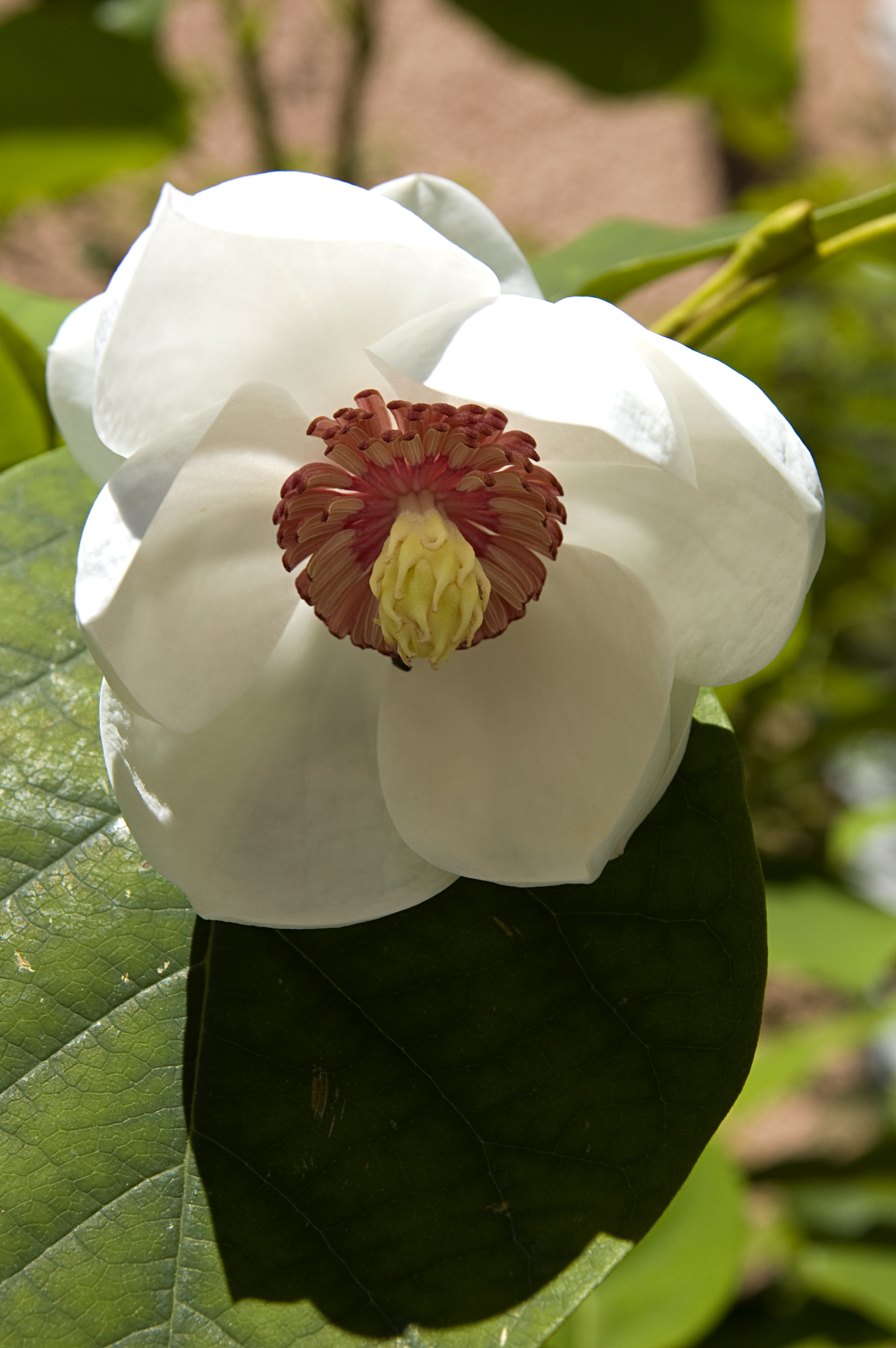
- Flower: Magnolia sieboldii

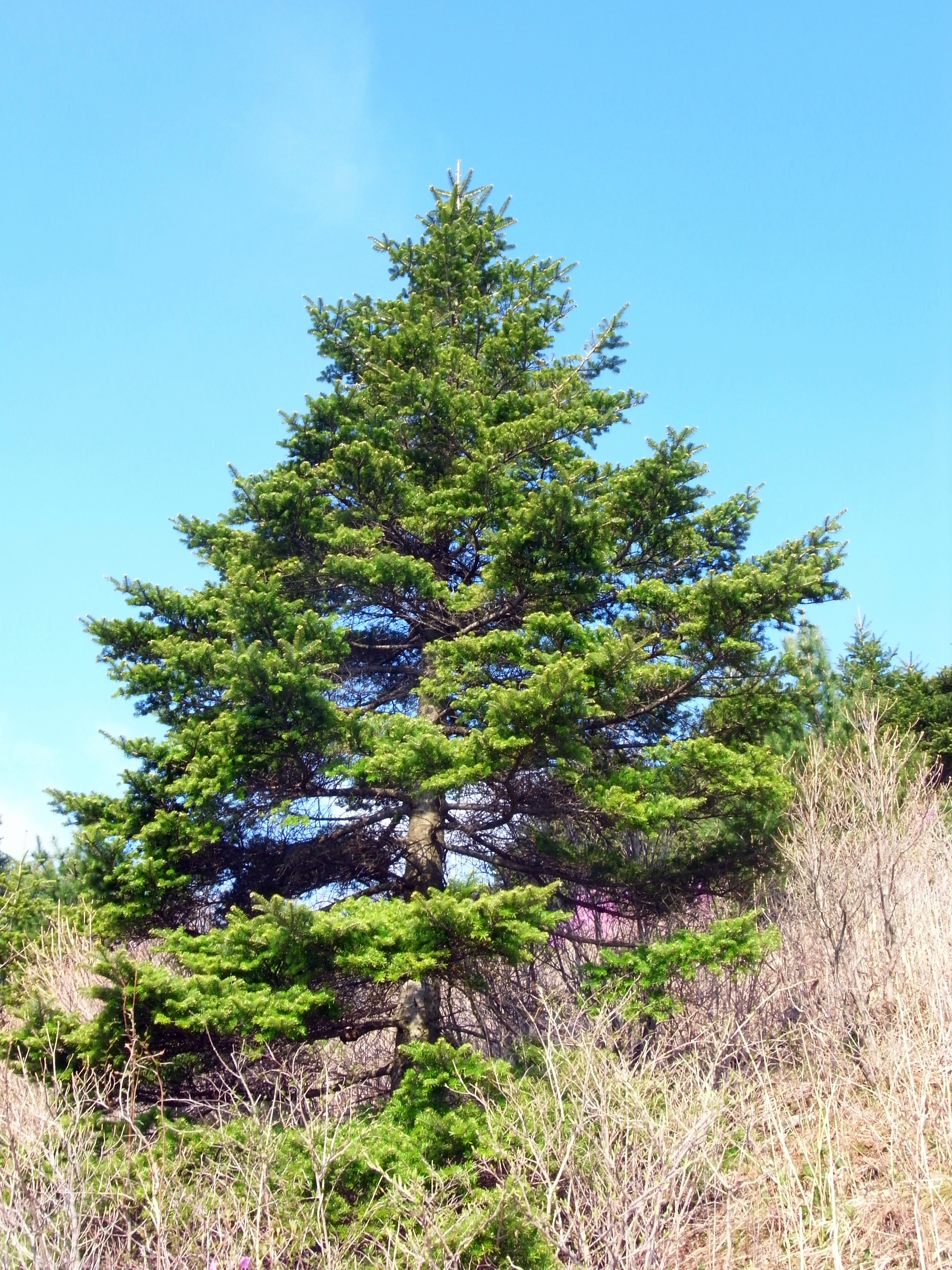
- Tree: Pine (Pinus densiflora)

Inanimate insignia
- Color: Red White Blue
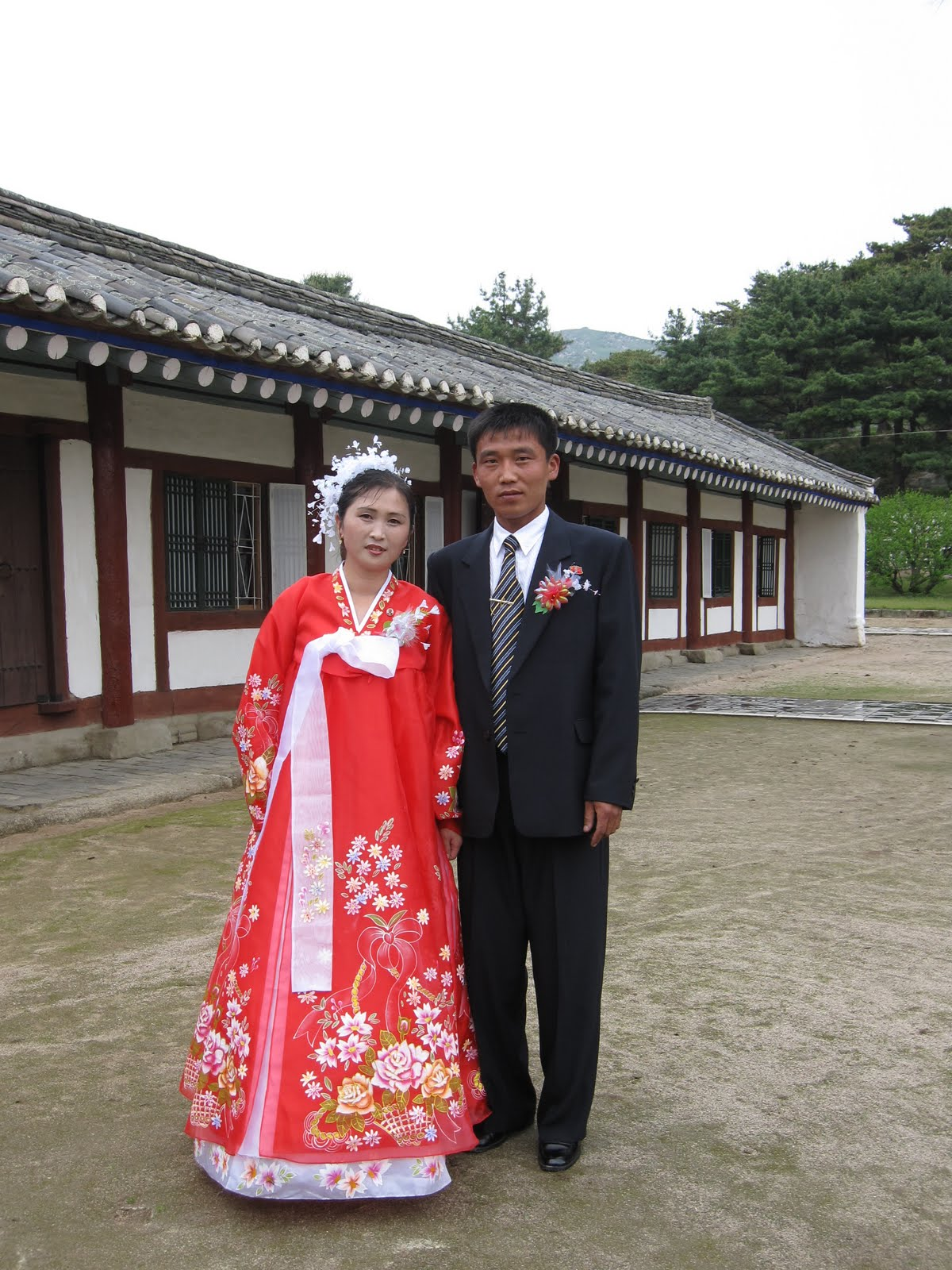
- Costume: Chosŏn-ot

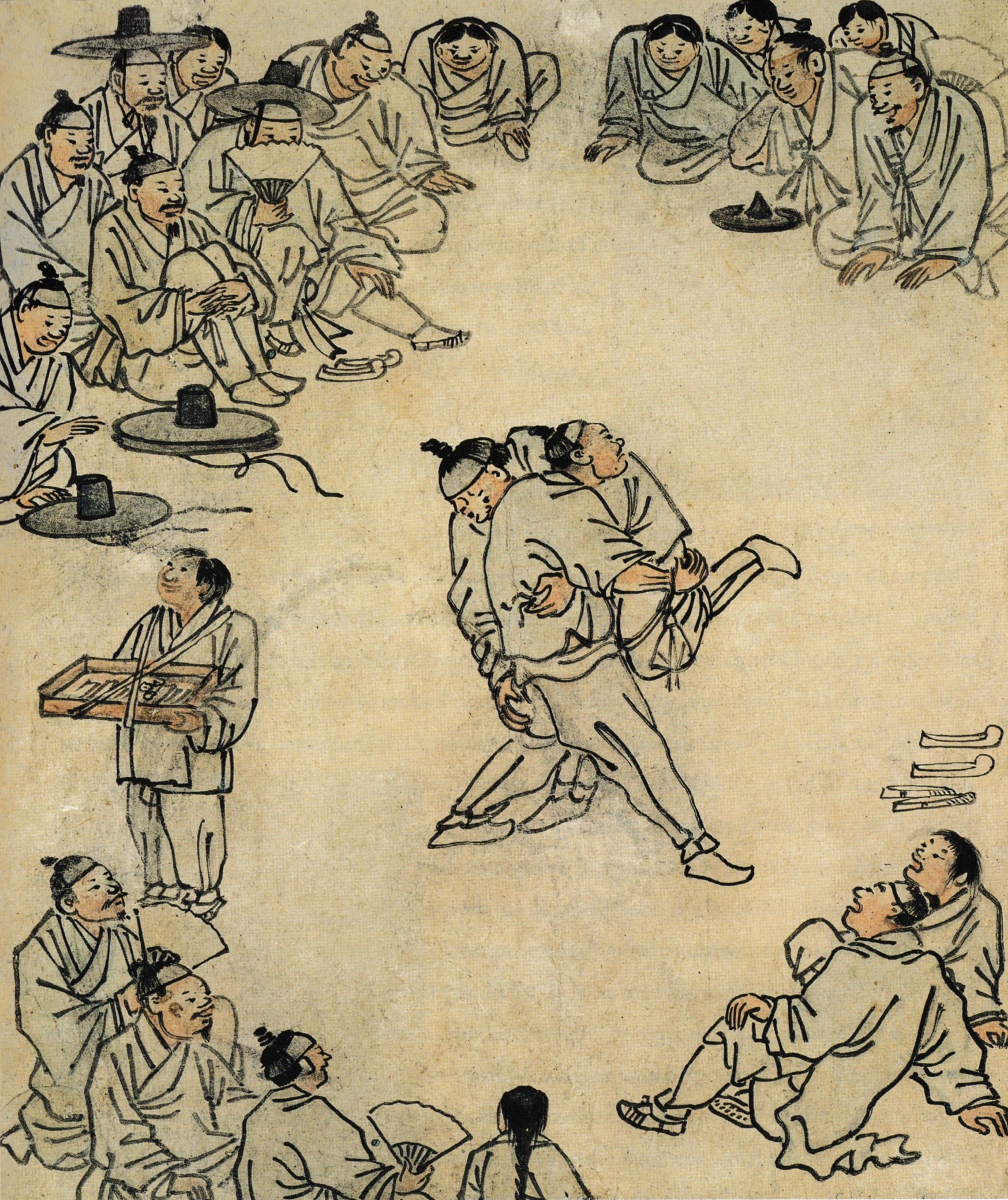
- Sport: Ssirum

Upon its liberation in 1945 and subsequent foundation in 1948, North Korea adopted national symbols distinct from the national symbols of South Korea. The traditional flag of Korea, the Taegukgi, and the symbol Taeguk, were swapped for socialist symbols.

Some of the symbols of North Korea—the national emblem, flag, anthem and capital—are defined in the constitution of North Korea, while others such, as the national sport Ssirum or the national dish kimchi, are traditional. Some traditional symbols are shared with the South but with different connotations. Mount Paektu, for instance, is recognized as the symbol of Korea across the peninsula, but North Koreans revere it as the birthplace of Kim Jong Il. Some North Korean symbols are complemented with symbols for the ruling Kim family. For example, the Magnolia sieboldii is the national flower but the hybrid orchid Kimilsungia and the begonia Kimjongilia are also respected.

== Constitutionally defined symbols ==
Chapter VII of the Socialist Constitution of the Democratic People's Republic of Korea defines the emblem, flag, anthem and capital of North Korea, while the head of state is stipulated by article 117 of chapter VI.

=== National emblem ===
The national emblem of the Democratic People's Republic of Korea bears the design of a grand hydroelectric power station under Mt. Paektu, the sacred mountain of the revolution, and the beaming light of a five-pointed red star, with ears of rice forming an oval frame, bound with a red ribbon bearing the inscription "The Democratic People's Republic of Korea."

— Article 169 of the Socialist Constitution of the Democratic People's Republic of Korea (1972, amended 2013)

The present emblem of North Korea was adopted on 9 September 1948, on the Day of the Foundation of the Republic. It features a hydroelectric plant and the design was, much like the flag, probably commissioned by the Soviets. The design was amended in 1993 to feature, under the red star, Mount Paektu – in itself an important symbol of Korea – which North Korea considers the birthplace of Kim Jong Il.

=== National flag ===
The national flag of the Democratic People's Republic of Korea consists of a central red panel, bordered both above and below by a narrow white stripe and a broad blue stripe. The central red panel bears a five-pointed red star within a white circle near the hoist.
The ratio of the width to the length is 1:2.

— Article 170 of the Socialist Constitution of the Democratic People's Republic of Korea (1972, amended 2013)

The flag of North Korea was introduced in July 1948 and adopted in September to replace Taegukgi, the traditional flag. The Taeguk symbol thus only remained in the flag and emblem of the South. The colors of the North Korean flag – red, white and blue – are considered national colors and symbolize respectively: the sacrifice of the people who fought in the Korean Independence Movement; purity, honesty, and dignity; and the revolutionary spirit of the Koreans.

=== National anthem ===
The national anthem of the Democratic People's Republic of Korea is "The Patriotic Song."

— Article 171 of the Socialist Constitution of the Democratic People's Republic of Korea (1972, amended 2013)

The national anthem is "Aegukka" (Korean for 'The patriotic song'), written by Pak Se-yong and composed by Kim Won-gyun in 1946. It is written to replace "Aegukga", which now only remained in the south. The first stanza of the song aims to show the dignity, pride and love to their country while the second is about the will to have Korea as a powerful, independent nation. The folk song "Arirang" is known as the "unofficial national anthem of Korea". North and South Korea have submitted it separately to UNESCO's Representative List of the Intangible Cultural Heritage of Humanity.

=== Capital ===
The capital of the Democratic People's Republic of Korea is Pyongyang.

— Article 172 of the Socialist Constitution of the Democratic People's Republic of Korea (1972, amended 2013)

The first 1948 constitution defined Seoul – the present capital of South Korea – as the capital city. In order to have succeeded in realizing this, the South Korean regime would have had to be removed. In 1972 the constitution was revised and Pyongyang designated as the capital.

=== Head of state ===
The President of the Presidium of the Supreme People's Assembly represents the State and receives the credentials and letters of recall of diplomatic representatives accredited by foreign countries.

— Article 117 of the Socialist Constitution of the Democratic People's Republic of Korea (1972, amended 2013)

The head of state of North Korea has been the President of the Presidium of the Supreme People's Assembly since 1998. The post was held by Kim Yong-nam since its current inception until the 11th of April 2019 when Choe Ryong-hae took the position.

== Animals and plants ==
North Korea has no official national animal, but the mythological winged horse Chollima is taken to be a national symbol. North Korean Siberian tigers are considered unofficial symbol of both Koreas as it represent the Korean people and nation.

The national dog is the Pungsan dog. Pungsan is named after what was once Phungsan County (now Kimhyonggwon County) in Ryanggang Province. It has been bred as a hunting dog. Recently, efforts to conserve and proliferate the breed have been taken.

The national bird is the Korean magpie (Pica serica). The bird can be found everywhere in the country all the year round. Traditionally, Koreans believed that if one hears magpies chirp early in the morning, one could have a welcome guest or news that day, have regarded it as a messenger bird, a clever and magical bird, and loved and protected it. It takes after the disposition and trait of the resourceful, righteous, brave, polite, dutiful and diligent Korean people, and symbolizes the peace-loving stand of North Korea.

The national flower is Magnolia sieboldii. Within North Korea, the flower can be found everywhere except for North Hamgyong Province, Ryanggang Province and Chagang Province. Two floral hybrids are also significant: Kimilsungia and Kimjongilia. They are both considered unofficial national flowers.

The national tree is Pinus densiflora, a type of pine tree. Pines are considered beautiful aspects of scenery and have been featured in Korean visual arts since ancient times. Pine trees are considered to be one of the ten symbols associated with longevity. The behaviour of the pine tree in winter is also seen as a symbol of a resolute will. Earlier, Kim Hyong-jik, the father of Kim Il Sung, had composed a poem: "Green Pine on Nam Hill" to promote liberation of the country.

== Others ==
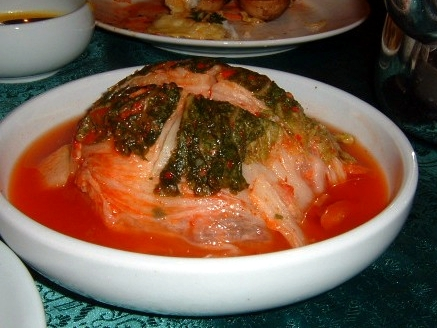
Kimchi, the national dish

The national day on 9 September is the Day of the Foundation of the Republic, a public holiday that commemorates the date when Kim Il Sung appointed a cabinet in 1948. Both the birthplace of Kim Il-sung at Mangyongdae and the Juche Tower are considered national monuments.

The national dish is kimchi, a spicy, fermented vegetable dish. North Korean kimchi tends to be less spicy than its Southern counterpart. Both are inscribed on UNESCO's Representative List of the Intangible Cultural Heritage of Humanity. The national liquor is Pyongyang Soju. The traditional Choson-ot (hanbok) is the national dress. The national sport is Ssirum, traditional Korean wrestling, but the martial art Taekwondo is important, too.

Kim Il Sung, founder and president of the modern North Korean state and his successor Kim Jong Il are considered national heroes if not national personifications. The Order of Kim Il Sung and the Order of Kim Jong Il are the highest orders of merit of the country. Cho Ki-chon is considered a national poet.

Mount Paektu is recognized as a symbol of Korea in the North and South alike, but North Korea has attached special significance to it by claiming that it is the birthplace of Kim Jong Il. Tangun, who is considered the founder-king of the Korean nation, is also said to be born at Mount Paektu and is celebrated in North Korea especially. In 1993 North Korean archaeologists located and dated remains in a tomb that they declared Tangun's grave.

== See also ==
- Culture of North Korea
- Cultural assets of North Korea
- National Treasure of North Korea
- Names of Korea
- Natural monuments of North Korea
- Orders, decorations, and medals of North Korea
- List of things named after Kim Il Sung
