= Altea (surname) =

Altea is a surname. Notable people with the surname include:

- Fernando Muñoz Altea (1925–2018), the King of Arms of the Royal House of Bourbon-Two Sicilies
- Rosemary Altea, medium and healer

== See also ==
- Altea (disambiguation)
- Altea (given name)
