= USS Osprey II =

Patrol vessel of the United States Navy

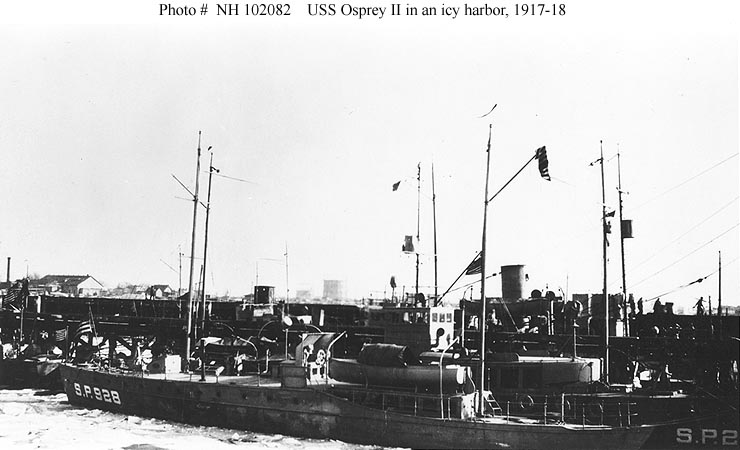
- USS Osprey II (foreground) in an icy port with other section patrol vessels during the winter of 1917-1918.

History

United States
- Name: USS Osprey II
- Namesake: Previous name retained
- Builder: William Whittlesey, New York City
- Acquired: 10 August 1917
- Commissioned: 5 November 1917
- Fate: Returned to owner 26 December 1918
- Notes: Operated as private motorboat Osprey II until 1917 and from 1918

General characteristics
- Type: Patrol vessel
- Tonnage: 44 Gross register tons
- Length: 80 ft (24 m)
- Beam: 14 ft (4.3 m)
- Draft: 4 ft (1.2 m)
- Speed: 12 knots
- Armament: 1 × 1-pounder gun; 2 × machine guns

USS Osprey II (SP-928) was a United States Navy patrol vessel in commission from 1917 to 1918.

Osprey II was built as a private motorboat of the same name by Williams-Whittlesey Co. in New York City. On 10 August 1917, the U.S. Navy acquired her from her owner, C. R. Runyon, for use as a section patrol boat during World War I. She was commissioned as USS Osprey II (SP-928) on 5 November 1917.

Assigned to the 3rd Naval District Osprey II operated on patrol duties in the Marine Basin and New York Harbor.

In July 1918, Osprey II was deemed to have proven unsuitable for naval use. Decommissioned at the shipyard of the Charles L. Seabury Company at Morris Heights in the Bronx, New York, she was returned to Runyon on 26 December 1918.
