= Francis Braithwaite =

British Air Vice-Marshal (1907–56)

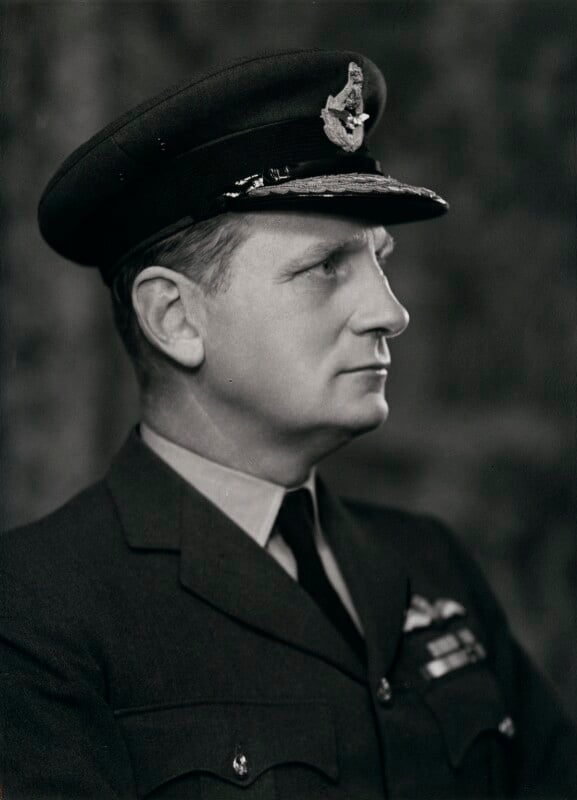
Braithwaite in 1954

Air Vice-Marshal Francis Joseph St George Braithwaite CBE (16 October 1907 - 21 December 1956), was a senior British Royal Air Force officer.

He was educated at Corpus Christi College, Cambridge, where he was a member of the Cambridge University Air Squadron.

Braithwaite took off from Singapore's Changi Airport in a Gloster Meteor on 21 December 1956, but his aircraft crashed in poor weather on the Indonesian Island of Palau Batam, south of Singapore, and he was found dead later that day.

His daughter, Althea Braithwaite, was a children's author, illustrator, publisher and glass artist best known for Desmond the Dinosaur.
