= Williams-Whittlesey Co. =

Coordinates: 40.705°N 74.014°W

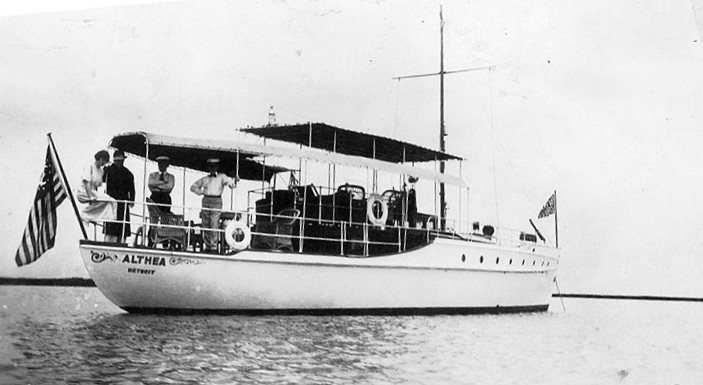
- Althea, likely before 1917

History

United States
- Name: USS Althea
- Owner: James H. Moore / U.S. Navy / G. F. Colton
- Builder: Williams-Whittlesey Co., New York
- Completed: 1907
- Acquired: 15 June 1917
- Commissioned: 12 May 1917
- Decommissioned: 2 August 1919
- Stricken: 2 August 1919
- Home port: Detroit, Michigan
- Fate: Sank, 18 March 1920; sold for salvage, 12 May 1920; abandoned, 1926

General characteristics
- Displacement: 25 long tons (25 t)
- Length: 60 ft (18 m)
- Beam: 12 ft (3.7 m)
- Draft: 4 ft (1.2 m)
- Speed: 9.5 mph
- Complement: 9
- Crew: 3
- Armament: 1 × 3-pounder, 2 × machine guns

Williams-Whittlesey Motor Boat and Shipbuilding Co., often referred to as Williams-Whittlesey Co. and known until 1904 as the Standard Boat Co., was an American boatbuilding company in Queens, New York, that operated at least from 1891 to 1910. Headquartered in Long Island City with a boatyard in the adjacent Astoria neighborhood, the company produced tugboats, river vessels, scows, and yachts. Among its products were two private motorboats that were later commissioned by the United States Navy for service during World War I: Osprey II, which served as USS Osprey II (SP-928) from 1917 to 1918; and Althea, which served as USS Althea (SP-218) from 1917 to 1919.

In 1904, the Standard Boat Co.'s owners changed the name to Williams-Whittlesey Motor Boat and Shipbuilding Co. because they "felt that their firm was very often confused with the Standard Motor Construction Co. of Jersey City, New Jersey".

Among its naval architects was H. Newton Whittelsey, whose yacht designs were noted for introducing "the modern type of large raised deck cruiser," according to Motor Boating magazine. Another employee was Daniel I. Whittlesey, a 1901 graduate of Yale University's Sheffield Scientific School. By 1916, Whittelsey and Whittlesey had formed their own shipbuilding company headquartered at 11 Broadway in Manhattan.
