= Ahn Eak-tai =

South Korean composer (1906–1965)

- Ahn Eak-tai in 1955.
- Born: 5 December 1906; Pyongyang, Korean Empire
- Died: 16 September 1965 (aged 58); Mallorca, Spain
- Burial place: Seoul National Cemetery
- Education: Kunitachi College of Music; University of Cincinnati; Curtis Institute of Music
- Known for: Composer of the South Korean national anthem
- Spouse: Lolita Ahn (née: Talavera) (m. 1945)

Korean name
- Hangul: 안익태
- Hanja: 安益泰
- RR: An Iktae
- MR: An Ikt'ae

Ahn Eak-tai (/ˈɑːn ˌiːkˈteɪ/; Korean: 안익태; Hanja: 安益泰; pronounced [ɐn.ik̚tʰε]; 5 December 1906 – 16 September 1965) was a Korean classical composer and conductor. He conducted numerous major orchestras across Europe, including the Vienna Philharmonic Orchestra, the Berlin Philharmonic Orchestra, and the Rome Philharmonic Orchestra. Ahn composed "Aegukga", a song best known as the national anthem of South Korea, Korean Dance, Nongae, and the Symphonic Fantasy Korea. His unpublished works, some of which have been discovered recently, include Poema Synfonic 'Mallorca, Lo Pi Formentor, and The Death of Emperor Gojong.

Ahn Eak-tai was born in the northern part of Korea just before the colonial era, and attended a school staffed by Catholic missionaries. There he developed an interest in music as he played a trumpet in the school orchestra. He received his higher education from the Kunitachi Music School in Japan, at the University of Cincinnati, and at the Curtis Institute of Music in the United States during the Great Depression. Ahn continued his study at Vienna under Bernhard Paumgartner, and under Zoltán Kodály at the Eötvös Loránd University in Hungary. Upon a second visit to Vienna, Ahn received assistance from Richard Strauss to bring Symphonic Fantasy Korea to near completion. Beginning with a concert in Budapest, Ahn spent the next five years conducting in Europe. The escalation of World War II brought Ahn to Spain, where he met Lolita Talavera, his future wife. After their marriage in 1946, the two moved to the United States, where Ahn conducted the Philadelphia Orchestra. Then, in 1955, Ahn returned to South Korea, and conducted the Seoul Philharmonic until his death.

== Early life and education ==
Ahn was born into a wealthy family in the city of Pyongyang, now the capital of North Korea, on 5 December 1906, four years before Korea fell under Japanese rule in 1910. His family was a branch of the Ahn clan rooted in the region of Sunheung, part of Yeongju, North Gyeongsang Province. The clan is renowned for having produced influential Korean figures such as An Jung-geun and An Chang-ho in the period. Ahn Eak-tai was the third son of his father, Ahn Deok-hun (안덕훈) and mother, Kim Jeong-ok (김정옥) Ahn Eak-tai had six siblings. His father, Ahn Deok-hun, ran a hotel business and wanted his children to receive advanced Western education. His eldest son, Ahn Eak-sam, was sent to Tokyo to study.

In the meanwhile, Ahn Eak-tai was drawn into music and sang hymns at a village church. Ahn Eak-sam was well aware of his younger brother's interest in music, and so bought him a Suzuki violin, a phonograph and records from Japan. Ahn Eak-tai started playing the violin and began to develop his musical talent early on. In 1914, he entered Pyongyang Jongno Elementary School (평양종로보통학교) and began to play the trumpet. In 1918, he was admitted to the Pyongyang Soongsil Middle School, where he played in the school orchestra. He received a cello from Eak-sam and the Rev. Dr. Eli Miller Mowry, the American principal of the school, as a congratulatory gift. introduced a music teacher at YMCA, Mr. Greg to him for a private cello lesson.

In 1919, the Rev. Mowry led the school orchestra in participating in the March First Movement, a nationwide effort among Koreans to protest against Japanese rule over the Korean peninsula. From this experience, Ahn developed a fervor for the Korean independence movement, and began a student-held movement to protest against pro-Japanese teachers; the school deemed Ahn's actions inappropriate, and punished him accordingly. Sometime in September, Ahn involved himself in an effort to raid a jail in order to rescue the 1 March Movement activists caught by the Japanese police. When the police raided one of the meetings, Ahn successfully fled to Dr. Mauri's. The doctor treated Ahn's injuries for a week, and, upon receiving requests from the police to surrender Ahn, made a personal visit to the local police station to discuss alternatives. Impressed with Dr. Mauri's character, the department head let Ahn forego imprisonment by forging papers that permitted Ahn to study music in Tokyo.

== Study in Japan ==
On 6 October 1919, Ahn took a train to Busan and boarded a ship for Shimonoseki. During his stay with his brother Iksam, Ahn succeeded in entering the Tokyo Seisoku Middle School. In 1926, Ahn was accepted to the Kunitachi College of Music. In the summer of that year, Ahn came back to Korea on a music performance trip to gather funds for the reconstruction of a burned down church. There he happened to meet Yi Sangjae, the founder of the Dokrip Newspaper, and Jo Mansik, an independence movement leader who advocated the use of Korean-made products so that Koreans' debts might be paid. Upon Jo's request, Ahn led a demonstration promoting the use of Korean commodities by playing his cello in an automobile.

In 1928, Ahn's father died, and his mother faced financial difficulty in providing for all five of her sons' education. Therefore, Ahn was hired by a luxurious restaurant as a cellist. Even then, Ahn could not fully pay for his tuition, and the school therefore forbade Ahn to graduate. Furthermore, Ahn accidentally broke his cello, and had to borrow his classmate's. One of Ahn's Japanese peers expressed his respect for Ahn by purchasing him a new Suzuki violin. Eventually, Ahn was able to graduate when his teacher Hansford paid all of Ahn's tuition fees. Ahn had a late graduation, which, although for only one person, proceeded as if it were for many. Following his teacher's proposals, Ahn performed a cello concert; at this performance, a Japanese newspaper appraised Ahn as "a genius with a bright future".

In May 1930, Ahn returned to Korea. Upon his visit to the Soongsil Middle School, Dr. Mauri suggested to Ahn that he continue his studies in the United States. After being prohibited by the Japanese police from holding a concert, Ahn concluded that following Dr. Mauri's advice would be necessary in order to avoid the social barriers placed on the Koreans.

== United States ==
Upon arriving in San Francisco, Ahn was jailed during the immigration inspection process, because he refused to hand his cello over to the officials. During the night, Ahn obtained permission from a prison guard to practice on his confiscated cello; unable to make a connection between a musician and a criminal, the prison guard investigated the cause of Ahn's imprisonment and arranged for his release the next day.

Back in San Francisco, Ahn went to a Korean church introduced by Dr. Mauri. During a service led by Pastor Hwang, Ahn heard the Korean national anthem, which, at that time, was sung to the tune of the Scottish song, "Auld Lang Syne". Ahn thought of the tune as unfit for a national anthem, and decided to try composing a new national anthem for Korea. As Ahn waited in the train station to head toward Cincinnati, Pastor Hwang gave him a black suitcase and a fountain pen with which to write the new national anthem.

As arranged by Pastor Hwang, Ahn met Park Wonjung, Ahn's senior alumnus at the Soongsil Middle School and the Kunitachi Music School, at the train station. Park, then a student at the University of Cincinnati College Conservatory of Music, assisted Ahn in entering the Conservatory. Ahn had to work at a restaurant for low wages in order to make a living, as expected during the Great Depression. In 1930, Ahn was accepted into the Cincinnati Symphony Orchestra as the first cellist, and, during the spring break of his second year, he toured the United States playing recitals in major cities. In New York City, Ahn was allowed to perform in Carnegie Hall, a show that New York newspapers wrote about with positive commentaries.

After his successful tour, Ahn changed his career goal from cellist to conductor. In 1935, Ahn transferred to the Curtis Institute of Music in Philadelphia, graduating in 1936. Around this time, Ahn successfully led a choir in Candem Church; having heard about Ahn and then attending a service at the church, conductor Leopold Stokowski invited him to join the Philadelphia Orchestra. Unfortunately, Ahn was unable to pay his rent, as he was focused on writing his first orchestral score called Symphonic Fantasy Korea; however, the Peables, Ahn's neighbors, offered to pay his rent for him.

Ahn successfully submitted Symphonic Fantasy Korea to a competition in Carnegie Hall, and Ahn was given the chance to conduct the New York Philharmonic for the work's premiere. However, the performance turned out to be chaotic, as Ahn was unable to control the orchestra. Greatly angered, Ahn threw down his baton. The audience followed with shouts requesting another fresh performance; Ahn refused, expressing his disappointment at the orchestra. The Peables praised Ahn's actions, and apologized; they also offered to send Ahn to Europe to study and to pay his tuition.

== Europe ==
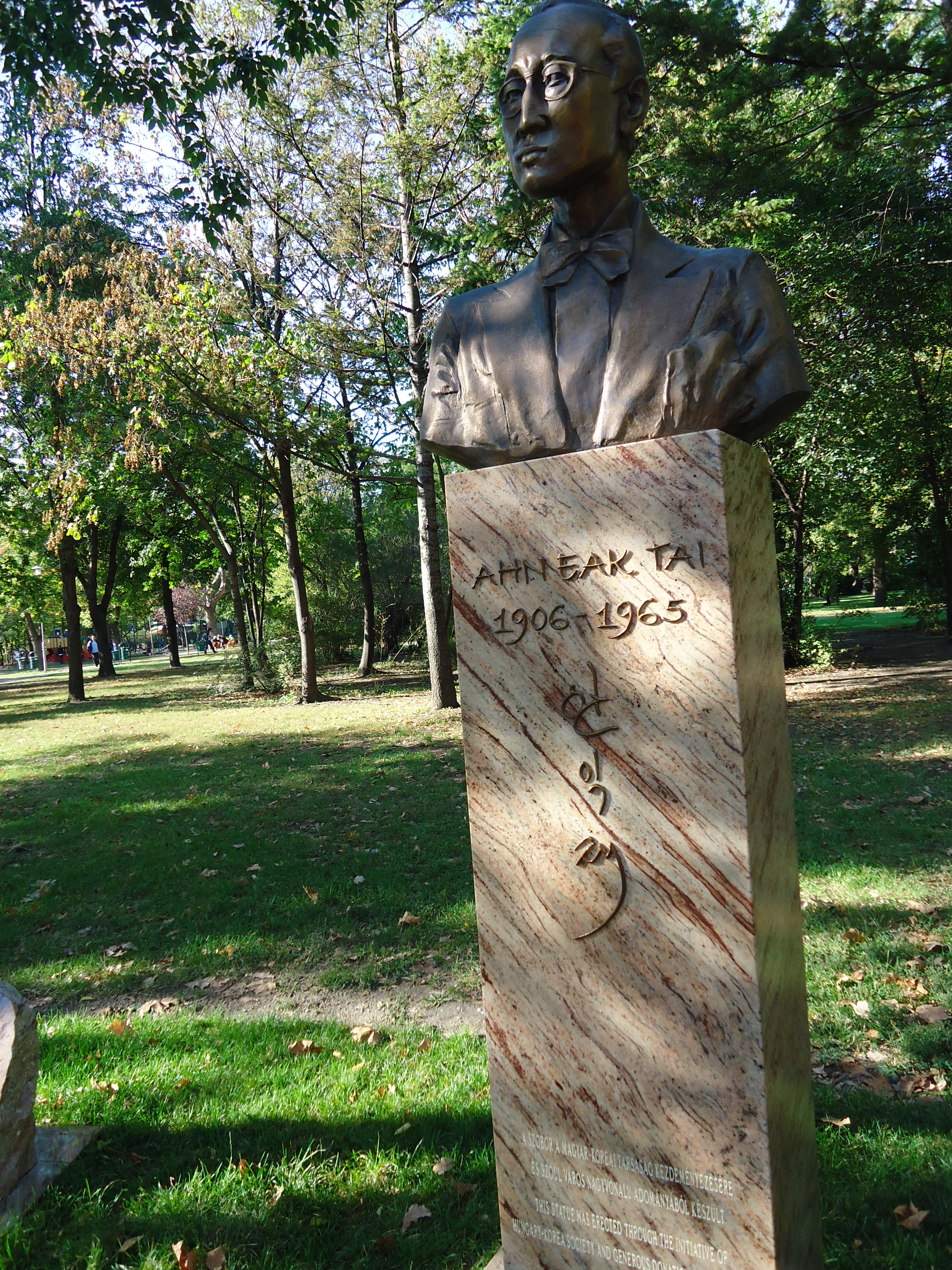
Bust of Ahn in Budapest's City Park

On 8 April 1936, Ahn left New York City, and, upon landing in Europe, headed to Berlin. There he completed Aegukga, the new Korean national anthem, and sent it to a Korean independence movement organization in San Francisco called the "Korean People's Meeting". He also made final touches to the Symphonic Fantasy Korea. Ahn moved to Vienna, Austria to study under Bernhard Paumgartner, a famous composer and Beethoven interpreter. In 1937, Ahn went to Hungary to study under Zoltán Kodály, applying his teachings specifically to Asian music in composing the Symphonic Fantasy Korea.

In 1937, Ahn was invited to Dublin, Ireland, to perform Symphonic Fantasy Korea. It easily won the Irish audience, as Ireland had been under British rule just as Korea was under the Japanese rule. He then went back to Vienna and met with the famous composer Richard Strauss to discuss his Symphonic Fantasy Korea. At the same time, Ahn was attending the Eötvös Loránd University on a scholarship from the Hungarian government, and, in 1939, Ahn graduated from the University. Complimenting Ahn on his talent, Strauss appointed Ahn to conduct a concert in Budapest in place of himself. Unfortunately, Ahn had spent so many hours in preparing for the concert that he collapsed during the last piece. Despite this, the Hungarian newspapers praised Ahn for his efforts. At Strauss's recommendation, the Rome Philharmonic Orchestra gladly accepted Ahn as its conductor; many other orchestras across Europe followed, and Ahn travelled all over Europe to perform.

In December 1940, Ahn was invited to conduct the Berlin Philharmonic Orchestra. The German newspapers filled their articles about Ahn with generous praises. Ahn continued to conduct many famous orchestras in Europe. On one occasion, however, Ahn was barred from the Rome Philharmonic Orchestra for performing the Symphonic Fantasy Korea, which the Japanese government had deemed politically displeasing. Ahn found another place to work, the Orchestre de Paris, but he was forced to leave in 1944, when Paris was liberated from the German forces. He was then invited by the Spanish ambassador to conduct for the Orquestra Simfonica de Barcelona.

During a social gathering, Ahn was introduced to Lolita Talavera (1915–2009), who had become a fervent fan of Ahn after seeing a film of one of his performances. Miss Talavera happened to be knowledgeable about the Japanese occupation of Korea, and Ahn felt understood. The two eventually became engaged, and, on 5 July 1946, Miss Talavera and Ahn were married, The two went to the island of Mallorca, where Ahn founded the Orquesta Sinfónica de Mallorca. In the same year, he sought to work in the United States, but his past association with Strauss, who was regarded as tainted by his work with the Nazi regime, obstructed his goal for two years; in the end, however, he was admitted into the Philadelphia Orchestra.

== Move to South Korea ==
On 15 August 1948, Ahn's arrangement of "Aegukga" was sung during the ceremony commemorating the establishment of the South Korean government. After the Korean War, President Syngman Rhee invited Ahn to be part of his 80th birthday celebration, and, on 19 February 1955, Ahn returned to his homeland after 25 years away from home. The military band played "Aegukga" upon Ahn's arrival. Soon after, Ahn was awarded the Cultural Medal of Merit.

On invitation from the Tokyo Geijutsu Daigaku, Ahn arrived at the Haneda Airport in January 1960, and conducted a concert at the Yaon Hibiya Auditorium on the night of 4 February. After his success in Tokyo, Ahn flew to Osaka where he held another concert. After the concert, Ahn urged the Korean population in the area, who had been divided politically between the North and South, to further unity and cooperate. Later in 1964, Ahn conducted a concert during the 1964 Summer Olympics, as requested by NHK.

After a successful concert in Spain, Ahn organised three successive Seoul International Music Festivals, but could not continue the event any further because it disrupted Ahn's work for the Seoul Philharmonic. On 16 September 1965, Ahn was stricken by a sudden illness and died while staying on the island of Mallorca, where he lived the last 20 years of his life. On 8 July 1977, Ahn's ashes were transferred from Mallorca to the Korean National Cemetery.

In 2008, Ahn was included in the list of pro-Japanese collaborators by the Institute for Research in Collaborationist Activities and the Committee for Publication of a Directory of the Biographies of Pro-Japanese Collaborators because he was a conductor at a concert which commemorated the 10th anniversary of Manchukuo.

== See also ==
- Hong Nan-pa
- Korean music
- List of South Korean musicians
- List of North Korean musicians
