= National symbols of South Korea =

The national symbols of South Korea are official and unofficial flags, icons, or cultural expressions that are emblematic, representative, or otherwise characteristic of South Korea (the Republic of Korea) and of its culture. Since the division of the Korean peninsula in 1948, South Korea has retained traditional symbols to distinguish from the national symbols of North Korea.

== Symbols ==
Type	Symbol	Image	Notes
Flag	Flag of South Korea	Taegukgi	The flag is known as the Taegeukgi. It features a red and blue taegeuk and four black trigrams.
Emblem	Emblem of South Korea	Emblem of South Korea	The original version of the emblem was announced on 10 December 1963. The emblem is known as the Gukga Munjang or Gukjang, and features a taegeuk surrounded by mugunghwa petals.
National anthem	Aegukga 애국가	Aegukga sheet music Aegukga	The term "aegukga" may generically refer to any patriotic song, but most often refers to the national anthem. The lyrics were written around 1907. The song was originally set to the tune of the Scottish folk song Auld Lang Syne, but new music was chosen in 1945.
Folk song	Arirang 아리랑		Arirang is a traditional Korean folk song that is included on the UNESCO list of Intangible Cultural Heritage as a symbol of both South Korea and North Korea.
Seal	National seal Guksae		The Guksae is a square seal that is stamped on important documents and represents governmental authority. The current version of the seal has been in use since October 25, 2011. The handle of the seal features a pair of sculpted phoenixes.
National motto	Hongik Ingan		Hongik Ingan (Korean: 홍익인간) is the official educational motto of South Korea. The phrase can be translated to English as "To broadly benefit the human world".
National tree	Korean red pine (Pinus densiflora)	Korean red pine	The Korean red pine is not an official symbol, but is often unofficially regarded as the national tree of South Korea.
National flower	Mugunghwa (Hibiscus syriacus)	Hibiscus syriacus	The Mugunghwa has been a symbol of Korea since ancient times.
National bird	Korean magpie (Pica serica)	Korean magpie	The magpie was chosen as the national bird of South Korea in 1964.
National animal	Siberian tiger (Panthera tigris tigris)	Siberian tiger	The Korean tiger is a historical and cultural symbol of the Korean peninsula and is important in traditional Korean culture.
National currency	South Korean won		The South Korean won was introduced in 1902. It was replaced by the hwan in 1952, but the won was reintroduced in 1962.
Patron saint	Andrew Kim Taegon		Andrew Kim Taegon was Korea's first Catholic priest and is the Catholic patron saint of Korea.
National sport	Taekwondo	Taekwondo	Taekwondo was officially designated as South Korea's national martial art in 2018.
National dish	Kimchi	Various kimchi	Kimchi has been a staple of Korean cuisine for centuries, and is regarded as the national dish of South Korea.
National drink	Soju		The national drink of South Korea is soju, a grain-based spirit often served in shot glasses.
