= Althaea =

Althaea is the Latin rendering of Greek Ἀλθαία Althaia, which may be related to Greek ἀλθος althos "healing". It may refer to:

- Althaea (mythology), the daughter of Thestius and mother of Meleager
- Althaea (plant), a genus of up to a dozen species of perennial herbs, native to Europe and western Asia, that includes the marshmallow plant
- 119 Althaea, an asteroid

== See also ==
- Altea (disambiguation)
- Althea (disambiguation)
