= Aegukga =

National anthem of South Korea

English: Patriotic Song
- 애국가
- Sheet music atop the South Korean state emblem
- National anthem of South Korea Former national anthem of North Korea (1947–1948)
- Lyrics: Unknown (probably Yun Chi-ho or Ahn Changho), 1896
- Music: Ahn Eak-tai, 1935
- Adopted: August 1948; 78 years ago

Audio sample
- Instrumental, one verse performance by USNB: file; help

- Aegukga
- Hangul: 애국가
- Hanja: 愛國歌
- Lit.: Song of Loving One's Country
- RR: Aegukga
- MR: Aegukka

"Aegukga" (Korean: 애국가; Hanja: 愛國歌), often translated as "Patriotic Song", is the national anthem of South Korea. It was adopted in 1948, the year after the country's formation. Its music was composed in the 1930s and arranged most recently in 2018; its lyrics date back to the 1890s. The lyrics of "Aegukga" were originally set to the music of the Scottish song "Auld Lang Syne" before Ahn Eak-tai composed a unique melody specifically for it in 1935. Before the founding of South Korea, the version set to the music of "Auld Lang Syne" was sung, as well as when Korea was under Japanese rule by dissidents. The version set to the melody composed by Ahn Eak-tai was adopted as the national anthem of the Korean exile government, which existed during Korea's occupation by Japan from the early 1910s to the mid-1940s.

"Aegukga" has four verses, but on most occasions only the first one, followed by the chorus, is sung when performed publicly at events such as baseball games and football matches.

Performance of this anthem is prohibited in North Korea, as it is treated as a grave political crime.

== Etymology ==
Aegukga literally means "patriotic song". The Encyclopedia of Korean Culture defines "Aegukga" as "the song to wake up the mind to love the country". "Aegukga" in itself is differentiated from a national anthem. While a national anthem or gukga (lit. 'country song') is an official symbol of the state, aegukga refers to any song, official or unofficial, that contains patriotic fervor towards its country, such as Hungary's "Szózat" or the U.S. "The Stars and Stripes Forever". However, the nationally designated "Aegukga" plays the role of symbolizing the country. In general shorthand, the term aegukga refers to the national anthem of South Korea. Nevertheless, there are still more than ten other extant "Aegukgas" in South Korea.

== History ==
2018 official orchestral and choral vocal recording
Performed by the Seoul Philharmonic Orchestra and the Seoul Choir

2018 official orchestral recording
Performed by the Seoul Philharmonic Orchestra

2018 official orchestral recording (1 verse version)
Performed by the Seoul Philharmonic Orchestra

2020 orchestral and traditional instruments instrumental version (one verse)

U.S. Navy Band instrumental rendition of the 1945–1948 anthem (one verse)
Instrumental rendition of "Auld Lang Syne", which the words were originally set to during the United States Army Military Government in Korea and the People's Committee of North Korea

1942 piano and choral vocal recording (verses one and two)

2011 U.S. military band instrumental rendition (one verse)
Performed at the White House during an official South Korean state visit to the U.S.

=== Origins ===
The music to "Aegukga" was composed in 1935 by Ahn Eak-tai (1906–1965). It was customarily called the "national anthem" until it was officially established as the national anthem of South Korea after the government's foundation on August 15, 1948.

There are theories that the lyrics were written by either Yun Ch'iho, Ahn Chang-ho, or Min Young-hwan, but the National Institute of Korean History asserts that the song's original author remains unknown. It was not officially designated or adopted as the national anthem by the government, but it came to be customarily called the national anthem and eventually became the song symbolizing the Republic of Korea. Composer Ahn Eak-tai first encountered the lyrics of "Aegukga" during the March 1st Movement in 1919. Feeling regretful that "Aegukga" was being sung to the tune of the Scottish folk song "Auld Lang Syne," also known as "The Song of Farewell," he decided that he, as a Korean, should compose its melody himself and composed "Aegukga" in 1935.

Before the current Aegukga, the first national anthem was created during the Korean Empire era. After the Gabo Reform of 1894 and the establishment of the Independence association in 1896, many anthems to inspire patriotism were written in the private sector, numbering about ten. Although it is unclear which melodies were used, the lyrics began to be published in the Independence Newspaper. During this time, the Korean Empire’s national anthem was officially proclaimed, marking the first time a national anthem was formally established by the state.

After the proclamation of the Korean Empire, Emperor Gojong felt the need for a national anthem as a state symbol and announced the establishment of a military band by law in December 1900. He invited German musician Franz von Eckert (1852–1916). Eckert, who had served as the bandmaster of the German Navy, was invited to Japan in 1879, where he worked with the Japanese Navy and contributed to the spread of Western music. After 23 years in Japan, he returned to Germany in March 1900 and was recommended by the German Legation in Korea to come to Korea on February 19, 1901, bringing various instruments for a 50-member military band. Following Emperor Gojong's command, he completed the Korean Empire’s national anthem on July 1, 1902, based on traditional Korean musical scales, and it was proclaimed as the national anthem on August 15, 1902. Eckert was awarded the Taeguk Order of Merit, 3rd Class, for his contribution to composing the anthem.

The sheet music for the Korean Empire's national anthem was proclaimed and sent to over fifty countries worldwide. However, with the annexation of Korea by Japan in 1910, Japan's "Kimigayo" became the official anthem, and the Korean anthem was banned. After Korea's liberation, the national anthem was no longer adopted as the official national anthem because of his participation in Japan's "Kimigayo" composition.

Although the past Korean Empire's national anthem remained behind the scenes of history due to the circumstances of the times, it holds the status of being the first Western music composed in Korea and the first national anthem.

In 2018, music director, Park In-young, recomposed Aegukga, and added brass and woodwind instruments to the arrangement. She said, “while trying not to change Ahn’s original version, we gave it a more modern spin.”

All sporting events such as KBO baseball games start with the song.

=== Copyright ===
Since the composer Ahn Eak-tai died in 1965, the copyright for the music was to not expire until at least 2036. Two South Korean professional football clubs were sued by a copyright holders' group for playing this song in December 2003. However, on March 16, 2005, the composer's widow—Lolita Ahn—and her family relinquished all rights to "Aegukga" to the South Korean government. "Aegukga" has since become a public domain song.

== Lyrics ==
Korean original

1절
동해 물과 백두산이 마르고 닳도록,
하느님이 보우하사 우리나라 만세.

후렴:
무궁화 삼천리 화려 강산,
대한 사람 대한으로 길이 보전하세.

2절:
남산 위에 저 소나무 철갑을 두른 듯
바람서리 불변함은 우리 기상일세.

후렴

3절:
가을 하늘 공활한데 높고 구름 없이
밝은 달은 우리 가슴 일편단심일세.

후렴

4절:
이 기상과 이 맘으로 충성을 다하여
괴로우나 즐거우나 나라 사랑하세.

후렴

Hangul and Hanja

1節:
東海 물과 白頭山이 마르고 닳도록,
하느님이 保佑하사 우리나라 萬歲.

後斂:
無窮花 三千里 華麗 江山,
大韓 사람 大韓으로 길이 保全하세.

2節:
南山 위에 저 소나무 鐵甲을 두른 듯
바람서리 不變함은 우리 氣像일세.

後斂

3節:
가을 하늘 空豁한데 높고 구름 없이
밝은 달은 우리 가슴 一片丹心일세.

後斂

4節:
이 氣像과 이 맘으로 忠誠을 다하여
괴로우나 즐거우나 나라 사랑하세.

後斂

McCune–Reischauer

1-chŏl:
Tonghae mulgwa Paektusani marŭgo talt'orok
Hanŭnimi pouhasa urinara manse.

Huryŏm:
Mugunghwa samch'ŏlli hwaryŏ kangsan
Taehan saram taehanŭro kiri pojŏnhase.

2-chŏl:
Namsan wie chŏ sonamu ch'ŏlgabŭl turŭn tŭt
Param sŏri pulbyŏnhamŭn uri kisangilse.

Huryŏm

3-chŏl:
Kaŭl hanŭl konghwarhande nopko kurŭm ŏpshi
Palgŭn tarŭn uri kasŭm ilp'yŏndanshimilse.

Huryŏm

4-chŏl:
I kisanggwa i mamŭro ch'ungsŏngŭl tahayŏ
Koerouna chŭlgŏuna nara saranghase.

Huryŏm

Revised Romanization of Korean

1-jeol:
Donghae mulgwa Baekdusani mareugo daltorok
Haneunimi bouhasa urinara manse.

Huryeom:
Mugunghwa samcheolli hwaryeo gangsan
Daehan saram daehaneuro giri bojeonhase.

2-jeol:
Namsan wie jeo sonamu cheolgabeul dureun deut
Baram seori bulbyeonhameun uri gisang-ilse.

Huryeom

3-jeol:
Ga-eul haneul gonghwalhande nopgo gureum eopsi
Balgeun dareun uri gaseum ilpyeondansimilse.

Huryeom

4-jeol:
I gisanggwa i mameuro chungseong-eul dahayeo
Goerouna jeulgeouna nara saranghase.

Huryeom

IPA transcription (Note: Cf. Help:IPA/Korean and Korean phonology.)

[iɭ tɕʌ̹ɭ]
[to̞ŋ.ɦe̞ muɭ.gwa̠ pe̞k̚.t͈u.sʰa̠ɲ.i | ma̠.ɾɯ.go̞ ta̠ɭ.tʰo̞.ɾo̞k̚ |]
[ha̠.nɯ.ɲim.i po̞.u.ɦa̠.sʰa̠ | u.ɾi.na̠.ɾa̠ ma̠n.sʰe̞ ǁ]

[ɸʷu.ɾjʌ̹m]
[mu.ɡuŋ.βwa̠ sʰa̠m.tɕʰʌ̹ʎ.ʎi ɸwa̠ɾ.jʌ̹ ka̠ŋ.sʰa̠n |]
[tɛ̝.ɦa̠n sʰa̠.ɾa̠m te̞.ɦa̠n.ɯ.ɾo̞ kiɾ.i po̞.dʑʌ̹n.ɦa̠.sʰe̞ ǁ]

[i tɕʌ̹ɭ]
[na̠m.sʰa̠n (ɥ)i.e̞ tɕʌ̹ sʰo̞.na̠.mu | tɕʰʌ̹ɭ.ga̠b.ɯɭ tu.ɾɯn tɯt̚ |]
[pa̠.ɾa̠m sʰʌ̹.ɾi puɭ.bjʌ̹n.ɦa̠m.ɯn | u.ɾi ki.sʰa̠ŋ.iɭ.s͈e̞ ǁ]

[ɸʷu.ɾjʌ̹m]

[sʰa̠m tɕʌ̹ɭ]
[ka̠.ɯɭ ha̠.nɯɭ ko̞ŋ.βwa̠ɾ.ɦa̠n.de̞ | no̞p̚.k͈o̞ ku.ɾɯm ʌ̹p̚ɕ͈.i |]
[pa̠ɭg.ɯn ta̠ɾ.ɯn u.ɾi ka̠.sʰɯm | iɭ.pʰjʌ̹n.da̠n.ɕʰim.iɭ.s͈e̞ ǁ]

[ɸʷu.ɾjʌ̹m]

[sʰa̠ tɕʌ̹ɭ]
[i ki.sʰa̠ŋ.gwa̠ i ma̠m.ɯ.ɾo̞ | tɕʰuŋ.sʰʌ̹ŋ.ɯɭ ta̠.ɦa̠.jʌ̹ |]
[kwe̞.ɾo̞.u.na̠ tɕɯɭ.gʌ̹.u.na̠ | na̠.ɾa̠ sʰa̠.ɾa̠ŋ.ɦa̠.sʰe̞ ǁ]

[ɸʷu.ɾjʌ̹m]

English translation

1st verse
Until the East Sea's (Note: South Korea, and the Korean language in general, refers to the Sea of Japan as East Sea.) waves are dry, Mt. Baekdu worn away,
God watch o'er our land forever, our Korea eternal.

Refrain:
Rose of Sharon, thousand miles of range and river land;
Guarded by her people, ever may Korea stand.

2nd verse
Like that Mt. Namsan, armoured pine, standing on duty still,
wind or frost, unchanging ever, be our resolute will.

Refrain

3rd verse
In autumn's, arching evening sky, crystal and cloudless blue;
be the radiant moon our spirit, steadfast, single and true.

Refrain

4th verse
With such a will, such a spirit, loyalty, heart and hand,
Let us love, come grief, come gladness, this our beloved land.

Refrain

== See also ==
- National symbols of South Korea
