= Althea Braithwaite =

English children's author, illustrator, publisher and glass artist

Althea Mary Braithwaite (20 June 1940 – 27 August 2020), was an English children's author, illustrator, publisher and glass artist, best known for Desmond the Dinosaur.

Althea Braithwaite was born in Pinner, Middlesex, the younger daughter of Rosemary (née Harris) and RAF Air Vice-Marshal Francis Braithwaite.
