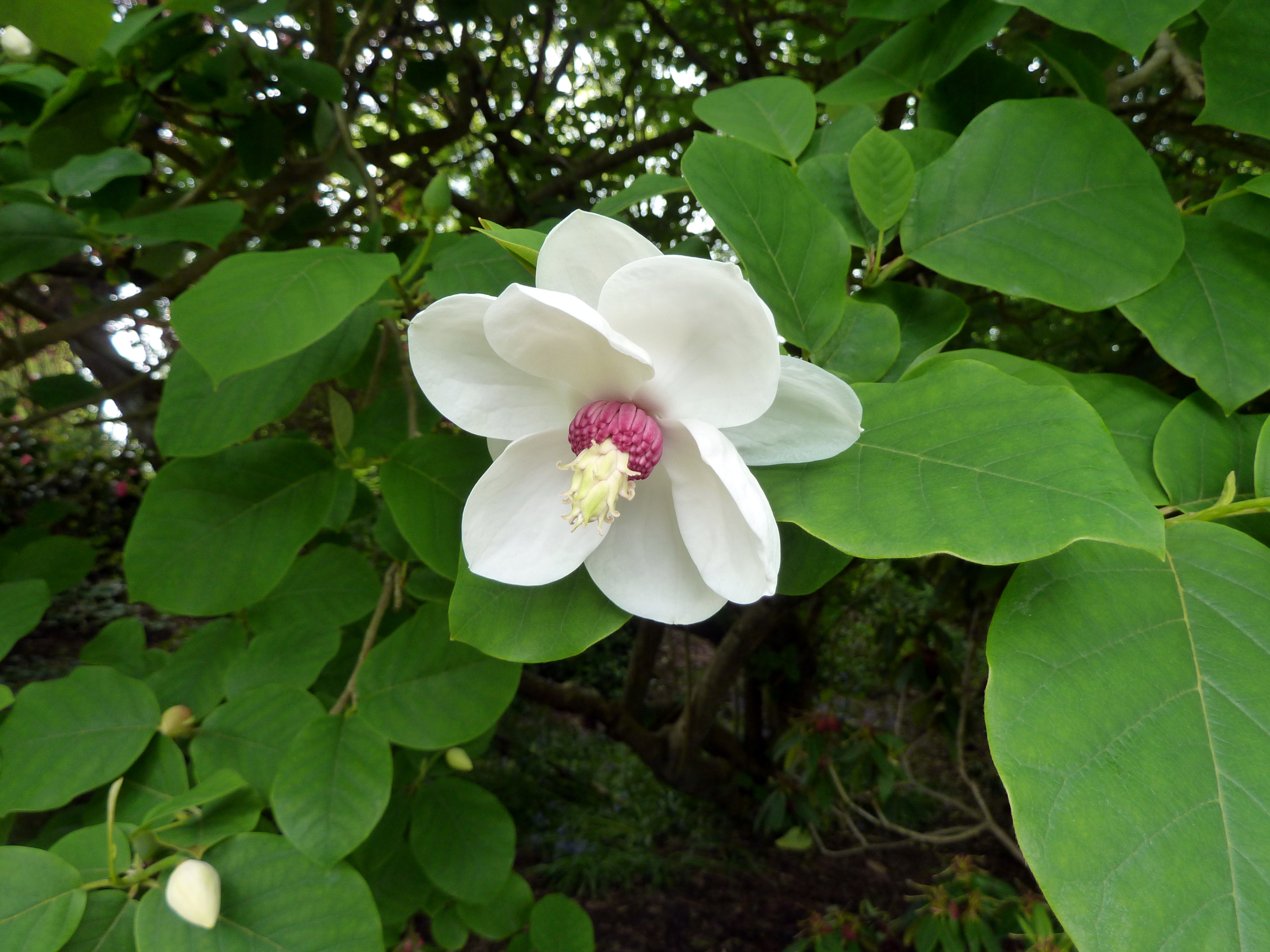

Conservation status
- Least Concern (IUCN 3.1)

Scientific classification
- Kingdom: Plantae
- Clade: Embryophytes
- Clade: Tracheophytes
- Clade: Angiosperms
- Clade: Magnoliids
- Order: Magnoliales
- Family: Magnoliaceae
- Genus: Magnolia
- Subgenus: Magnolia subg. Magnolia
- Section: Magnolia sect. Rhytidospermum
- Subsection: Magnolia subsect. Oyama
- Species: M. sieboldii

Binomial name
- Magnolia sieboldii K.Koch

Synonyms
- Magnolia oyama Kort; Magnolia parviflora Siebold & Zucc. nom. illeg.; Magnolia sinensis (Rehder & E.H.Wilson) Stapf; Magnolia verecunda Koidz.; Oyama sieboldii (K.Koch) N.H.Xia & C.Y.Wu; Oyama sinensis (Rehder & E.H.Wilson) N.H.Xia & C.Y.Wu

= Magnolia sieboldii =

Siebold's magnolia

Species of tree

Magnolia sieboldii, or Siebold's magnolia, also known as Korean mountain magnolia and Oyama magnolia, is a species of Magnolia native to east Asia in China, Japan, and Korea. It is named after the German doctor Philipp Franz von Siebold (1796–1866).

== Description ==
Magnolia sieboldii is a large deciduous shrub or small tree 5–10 m (16–33 ft) tall. The stalks, young leaves, young twigs and young buds are downy. The leaves are elliptical to ovate-oblong, 9–16 cm (rarely 25 cm) long and 4–10 cm (rarely 12 cm) broad, with a 1.5–4.5 cm petiole.

The flowers, unlike the spring flowering magnolias, open primarily in the early summer, but continue intermittently until late summer. They are pendulous, cup-shaped, 7–10 cm diameter, and have 6–12 tepals, the outer three smaller, the rest larger, and pure white; the carpels are greenish and the stamens reddish-purple or greenish-white.

== Taxonomy ==
It was described by Karl Koch in 1853.

=== Subspecies ===
There are three subspecies:

- Magnolia sieboldii subsp. japonica K.Ueda from Japan Low shrub; flowers with 6 tepals and greenish-white stamens.
- Magnolia sieboldii subsp. sieboldii Japan, Korea, eastern China. Tree or large shrub; flowers with 9-12 tepals and reddish-purple stamens; leaves smaller, rarely over 16 cm.
- Magnolia sieboldii subsp. sinensis (Rehder & E.H.Wilson) Spongberg Southwestern China (Sichuan); flowers as subsp. sieboldii; leaves larger, commonly to 22 cm.
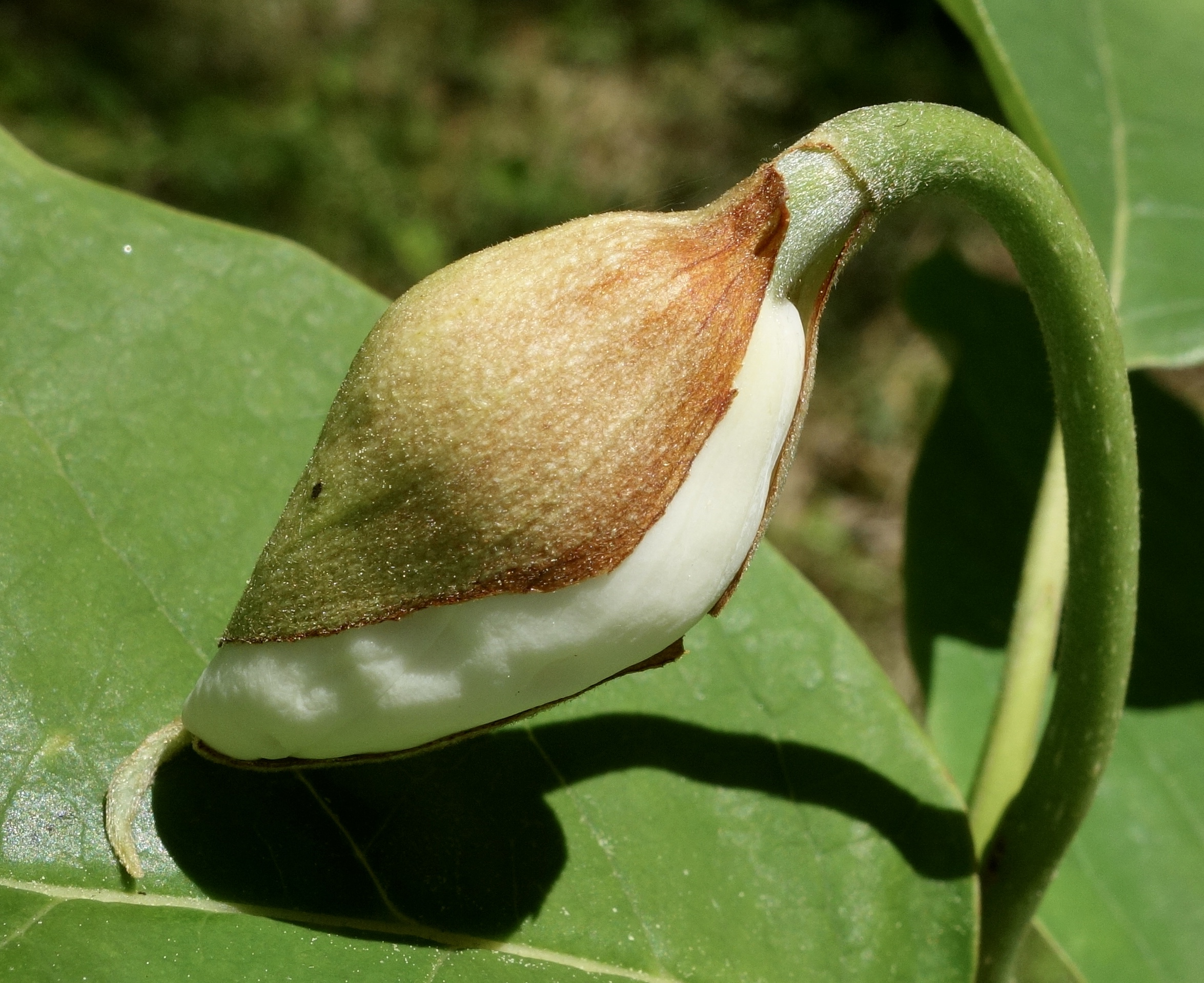
Flower bud

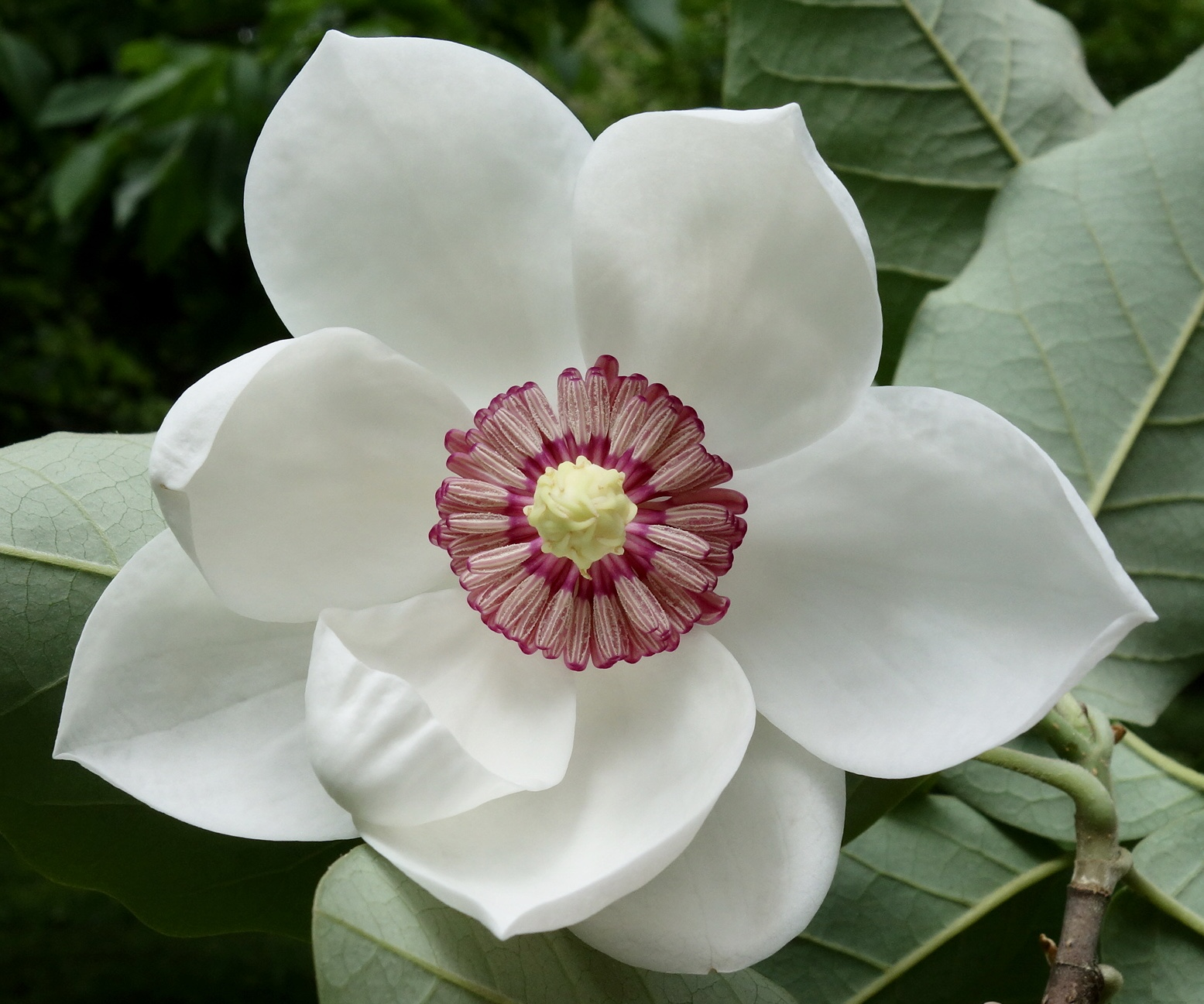
Flower, male phase

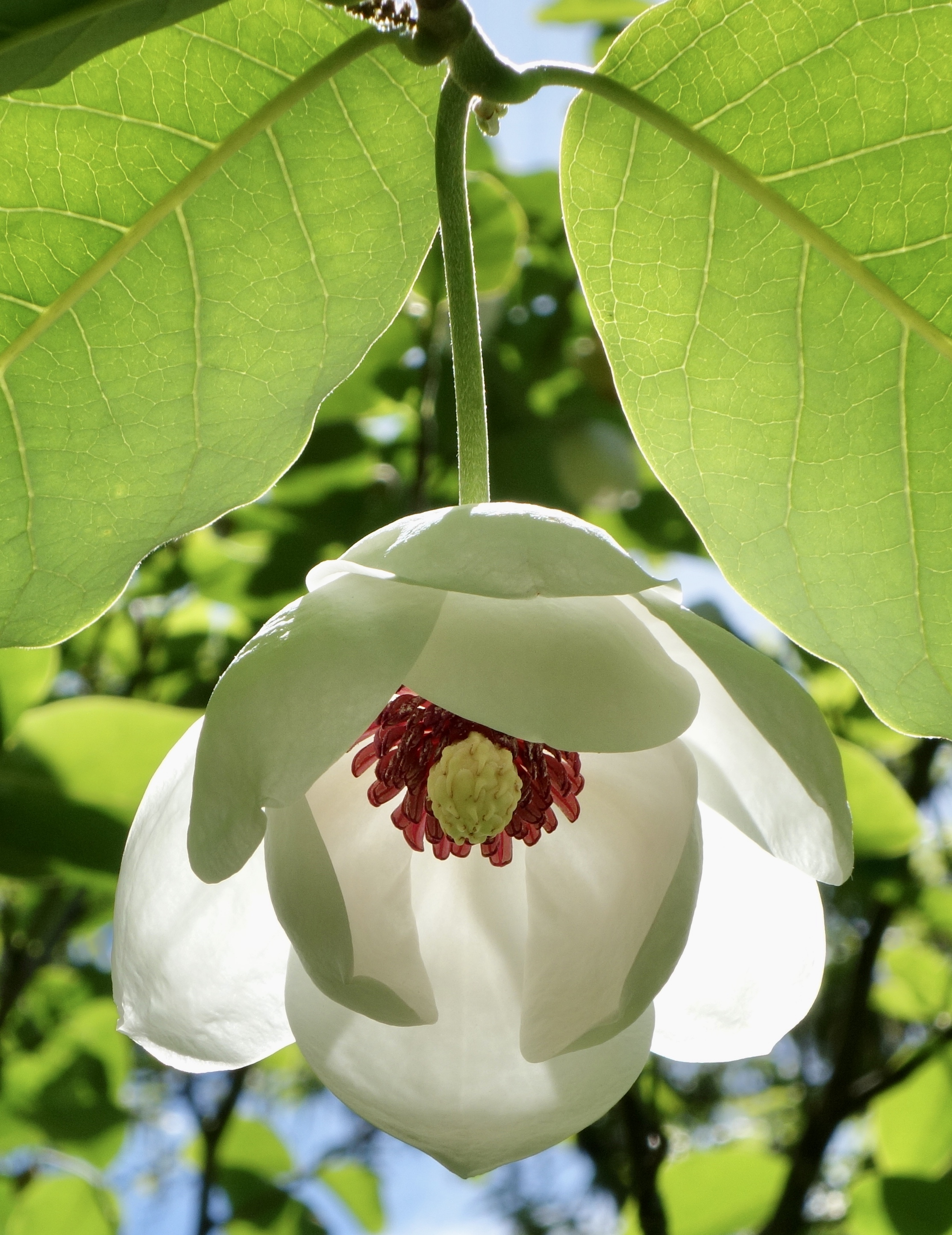
Flower

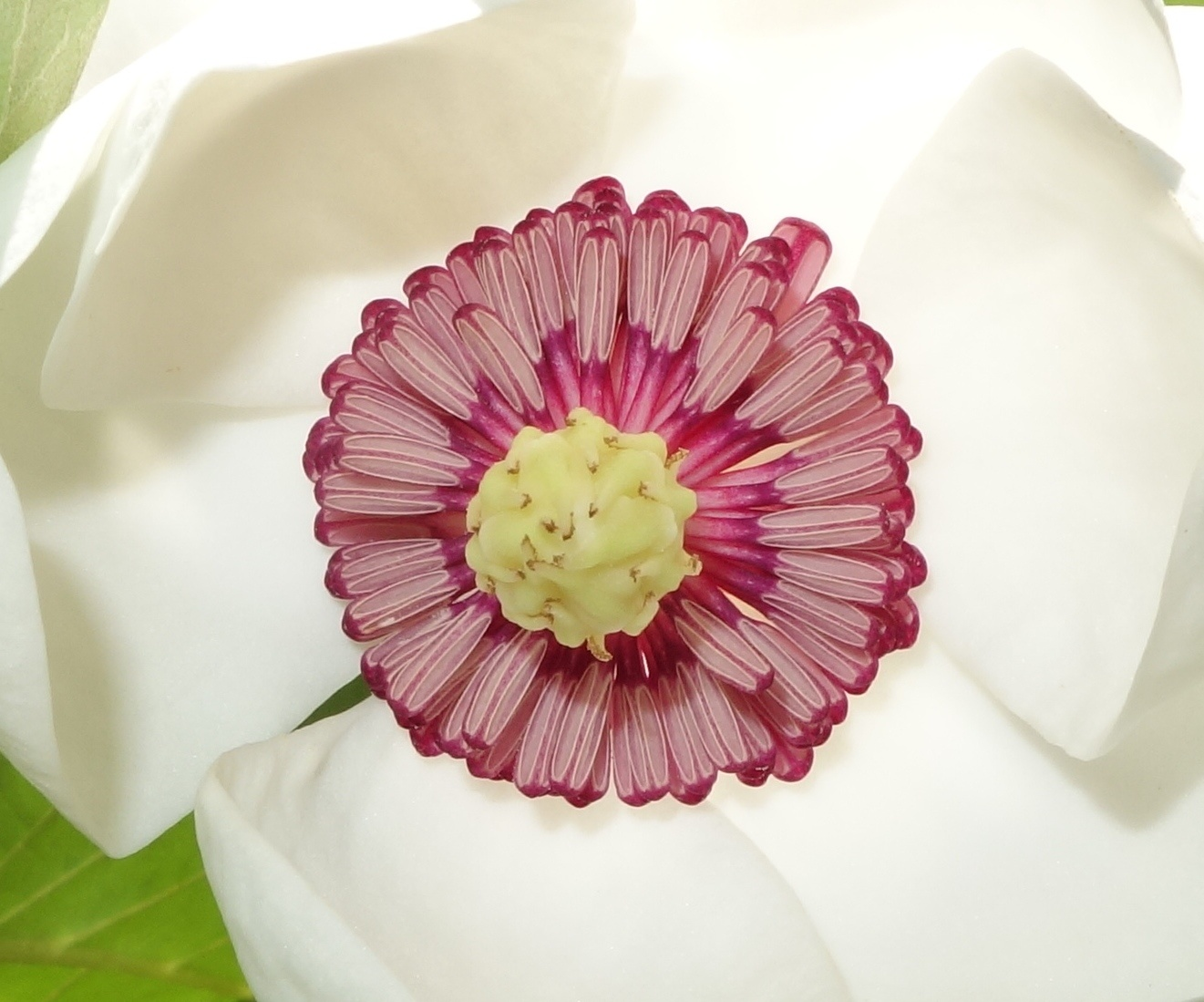
Flower detail

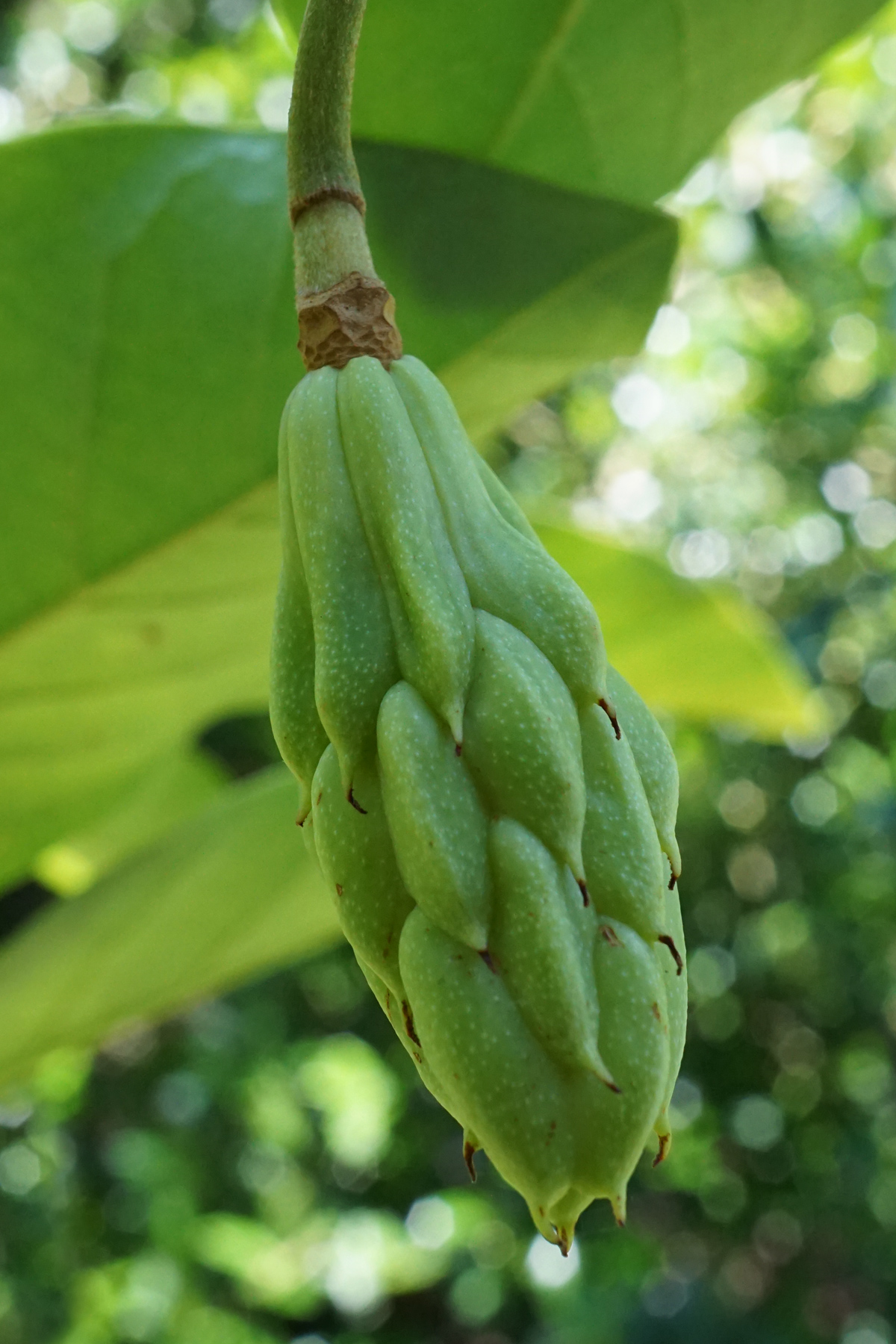
Immature fruit

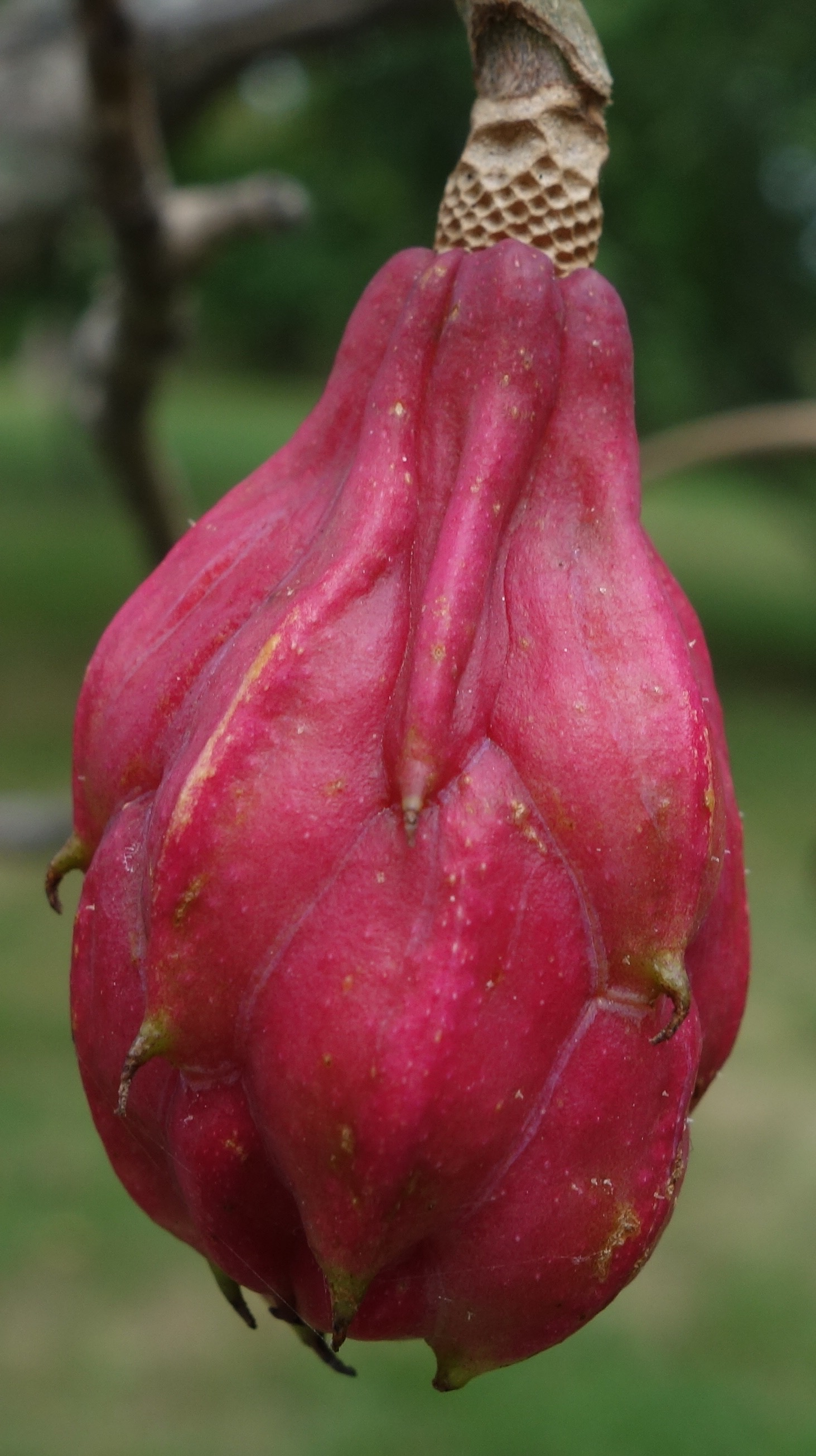
Nearly mature fruit

== Cultivation ==
Magnolia sieboldii is grown as an ornamental tree in gardens. It is one of the hardiest magnolias, successful in cultivation as far north as Arboretum Mustila in Finland. The cultivar 'Colossus' has gained the Royal Horticultural Society's Award of Garden Merit.

Called mongnan or mokran (목란/木蘭), Siebold's magnolia is the national flower of North Korea.
