= Althea, Missouri =

Extinct town in the American state of Missouri

Coordinates: 36°38′29″N 92°13′44″W

Althea is an extinct town in eastern Ozark County, in the Ozarks of southern Missouri, United States. The GNIS classifies it as a populated place. The location is on the North Fork River at the crossing of Missouri Route H, at an elevation of 623 feet. It is approximately five miles northeast of Tecumseh.

A post office called Althea was established in 1921, and remained in operation until 1926. An early postmaster gave the community the name of his daughter Althea Patrick.
