= Althea =

Feminine given name

- Pronunciation: stress on the first syllable (British) or second syllable (American)
- Gender: Female
- Language: Greek

Origin
- Meaning: healer, wholesome

Other names
- See also: Thea, Tia

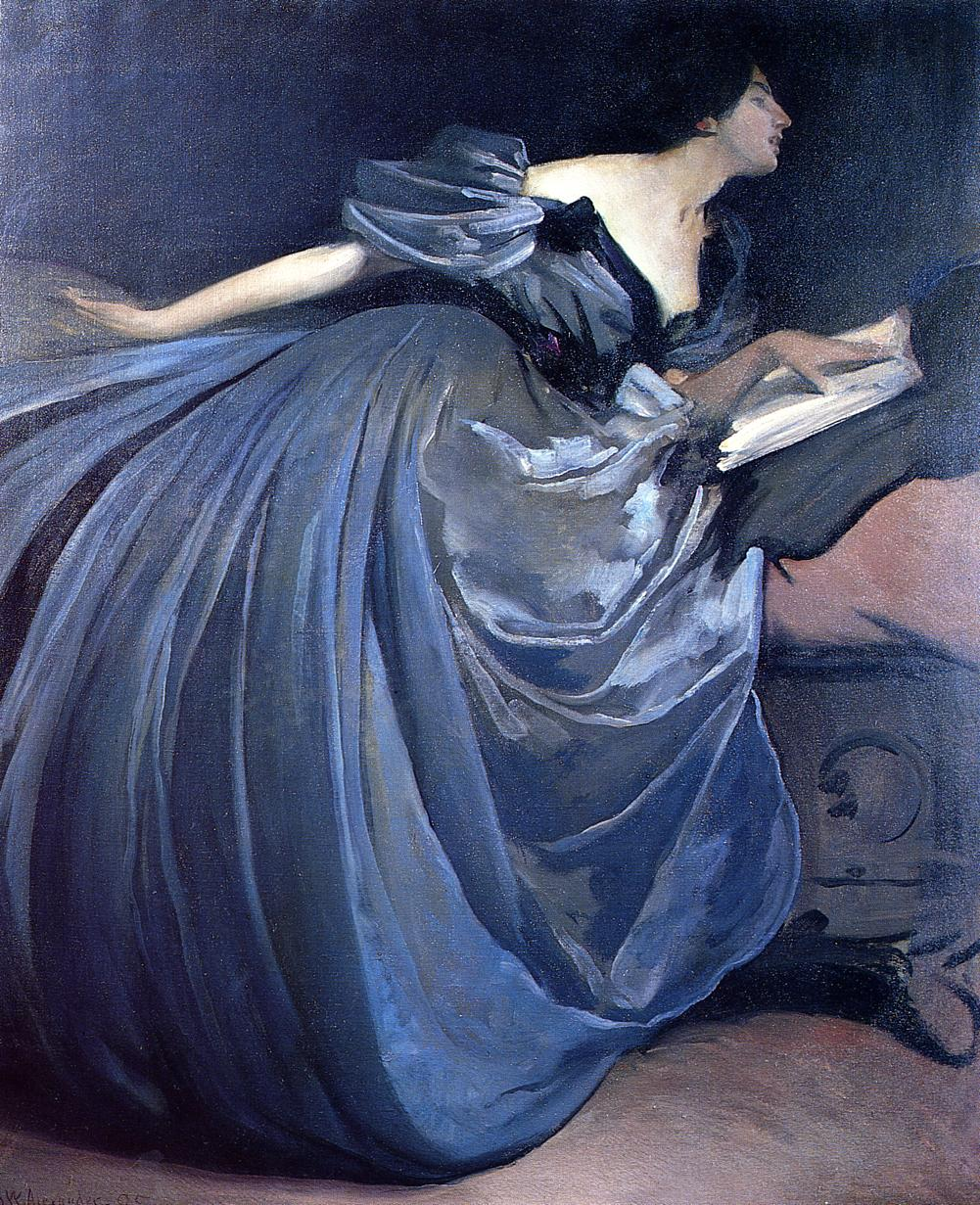

Althea (Old English: Alþea) is an English female given name. It is a variation of the Greek name Althaea (Αλθαια), which may be related to Greek ἀλθος althos ("healing").

Richard Lovelace used the name in a poem ("To Althea, from Prison") that John Milton later alluded to in his own poem "Lycidas".

== Notable people ==
- Althea Braithwaite (1940–2020), English children's author, illustrator, publisher and glass artist
- Althea Bridges (born 1936), Australian opera singer and music teacher
- Althea Currier (born 1941), American glamour model and actress
- Althea Flynt (1953–1987), fourth wife of Larry Flynt
- Althea Gibson (1927–2003), American athlete
- Althea Forrest, one half of vocal duo Althea & Donna
- Althea McNish (1924–2020), British textile designer of Trinidadian origin
- Althea G. Quimby (1858–1942), American temperance leader
- Althea Reinhardt (born 1996), Danish handball player
- Althea Thauberger, Canadian artist
- Althea Wynne (1936–2012), English sculptor
- Althea Rae Janairo, actress aka Tia Carrere
- Altheia Jones-LeCointe, Trinidadian physician and research scientist, leader of the British Black Panther Movement

== See also ==
- "Althea", a song on the Grateful Dead studio album Go to Heaven
- Althaea officinalis, also called althea or marsh mallow, a perennial species indigenous to Europe, Western Asia, and North Africa used in herbalism and as an ornamental plant
- Hibiscus syriacus, also called althea, rose of Sharon or rose mallow, a perennial species indigenous to East Asia used in herbalism and as an ornamental plant
- Cyclone Althea (1971)
- Ethinylestradiol/cyproterone acetate, a birth control pill with brand name Althea
