= MV Altea =

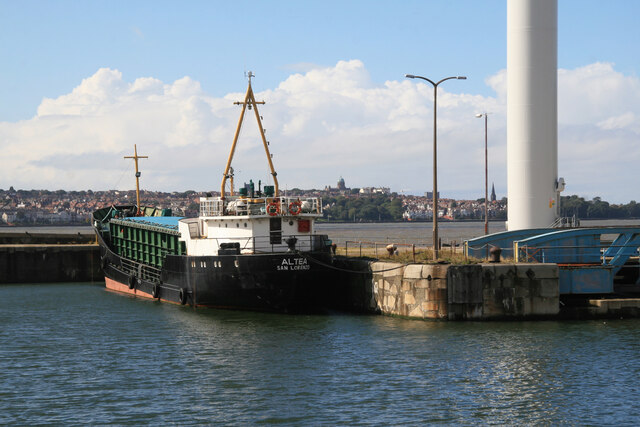
- Altea in Liverpool (2010)

History

United Kingdom
- Name: Westland Producer (1962-72); Vita Nova (1972-87); Moby Dick (1987-89); Altea (1989-2013)
- Owner: Westland Scheepvaart Mij. (1962-72); Gerrit de Vries (1972-87); Ch.O.de Leeuw (1987-89); Opinia S.A. (1989); UK Government (1989-2014)
- Port of registry: Naaldwijk, Netherlands (1962-72); Panama City, Panama (1972-87); Den Helder, Netherlands (1987-89); San Lorenzo, Honduras (1989-2014)
- Builder: de Groot & van Vliet, Slikkerveer, Netherlands
- Yard number: 341
- Launched: 17 February 1962
- Completed: 29 March 1962
- In service: 1962
- Out of service: 2014
- Identification: Official number: L-32203059; IMO number: 5388512; Code letters: PIOD (1962-72); HO7224 (1972-87); PGAN (1987-89); HQFD8 (1989)
- Fate: Put up for auction, June 2014

General characteristics
- Type: General cargo ship
- Tonnage: As built; 366 GRT; From 1967; 507 GT; 326 NT; 549 DWT
- Length: As built; 49.9 m (163 ft 9 in); From 1967; 56.86 m (186 ft 7 in)
- Beam: 7.75 m (25 ft 5 in)
- Draught: 2.82 m (9 ft 3 in)
- Propulsion: 1 × 6-cylinder 450 bhp (336 kW) MWM marine diesel engine; Single screw
- Speed: 11 knots (20 km/h; 13 mph)

MV Altea is a ship used for training purposes by the United Kingdom's HM Customs and Excise National Deep Rummage Team. It was first acquired by the government after being impounded in 1989 for being used in an attempt to smuggle 17 tonnes of cannabis into the United Kingdom. In 1991 it was towed to Liverpool. It has since been sold by auction, and is currently moored at Newnham-on-Severn pending sale to an unknown Caribbean carrier.

== Ship history ==
The ship was built by de Groot & van Viet at Slikkerveer in 1962 as the Westland Producer for the Westland Scheepvaart Mij., registered in Naaldwijk, and used as a general cargo vessel operating between England and the Netherlands. In 1967 the vessel was rebuilt for the transport of vegetable containers by de Groot & van Viet, and lengthened from 49.9 m (163 ft 9 in) to 56.86 m (186 ft 7 in). She was sold to Gerrit de Vries in 1972, renamed Vita Nova, and registered in Panama City, Panama. In 1987 she was sold to Ch. O. de Leeuw, renamed Moby Dick, registered in Den Helder, Netherlands, and converted for recreational and sports purposes. In 1989 she was sold to the Opinia Shipping Company, who renamed her Altea, and was registered in San Lorenzo, Honduras. In October 1989 Altea was stopped and searched in the English Channel, and 17 tonnes of cannabis was found aboard. The ship was impounded by HM Customs and Excise and taken to Dover. In 1990 Altea was sailed to Rochester where she became a training ship for the Customs service, and used to train officers in searching for contraband. In 1991 the vessel was towed to Liverpool and continued to be used as a training vessel at Huskisson Dock for the Border Forces "National Deep Rummage Team (NDRT)". In June 2014 the ship was put up for auction.
