= USS Althea (SP-218) =

Motor boat

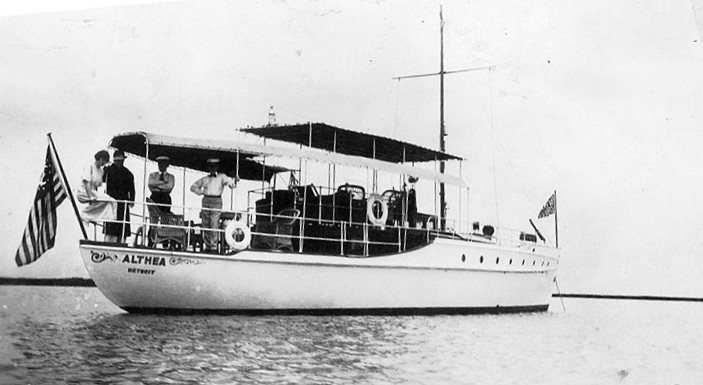
- Althea, likely before 1917

History

United States
- Name: USS Althea
- Owner: James H. Moore / U.S. Navy / G. F. Colton
- Builder: William Whitlesey Co., Astoria, New York
- Completed: 1907
- Acquired: 15 June 1917
- Commissioned: 12 May 1917
- Decommissioned: 2 August 1919
- Stricken: 2 August 1919
- Home port: Detroit, Michigan
- Fate: Sank, 18 March 1920; sold for salvage, 12 May 1920; abandoned, 1926

General characteristics
- Displacement: 25 long tons (25 t)
- Length: 60 ft (18 m)
- Beam: 12 ft (3.7 m)
- Draft: 4 ft (1.2 m)
- Speed: 9.5 mph
- Complement: 9
- Crew: 3
- Armament: 1 × 3-pounder, 2 × machine guns

USS Althea (SP-218) was a 60-foot motor pleasure boat that served in the United States Navy from 1917 to 1919 and was sunk by ice in 1920.

Althea was built by the Williams-Whittlesey Co. in the Steinway area of Astoria, Queens, New York, in 1907 for James H. Moore. She was taken over by the Navy on 12 May 1917 and placed in commission as USS Althea (SP-218). Formally purchased a month after commissioning, she was employed on Great Lakes section patrol and training duties under the 9th Naval District, operating out of Detroit, Michigan, for the rest of World War I and for several months after the war.

Althea was laid up for the winter on 14 November 1917, and returned to duty in May 1918. On 2 August 1919, she was stricken from the Naval Vessel Register, and laid up at the Naval Training Station, Detroit.

Althea was awaiting sale when she was sunk by ice on 18 March 1920. She was sold for salvage "in sunken condition" on 12 May 1920. to G. F. Colton of Detroit. She was abandoned in 1926.
