= USS Althea (1863) =

Tugboat of the United States Navy

History

United States
- Ordered: as Alfred A. Wotkyns
- Launched: 1863
- Acquired: 9 December 1863
- Commissioned: circa 24 April 1864
- Decommissioned: sank, 12 April 1865
- In service: 7 November 1865
- Out of service: 25 April 1866
- Stricken: 1866 (est.)
- Fate: Sold, 8 December 1866

General characteristics
- Type: Tugboat
- Displacement: 72 tons
- Length: 70 ft (21 m)
- Beam: 16 ft 4 in (4.98 m)
- Depth of hold: 7 ft (2.1 m)
- Propulsion: steam engine; screw-propelled
- Speed: 9 knots (17 km/h; 10 mph)
- Complement: 15
- Armament: one heavy smoothbore 12-pounder gun

USS Althea was a screw steamer acquired by the Union Navy during the American Civil War. The Union Navy used it as a tugboat, a torpedo boat, and a ship's tender in support of the Union Navy blockade of Confederate waterways.

== Service history ==
Alfred A. Wotkyns was a screw tugboat that Lewis Hoagland built in 1863 at New Brunswick, New Jersey. The Union Navy purchased it at New York City on 9 December 1863, and renamed it Althea. Soon thereafter it was fitted out for naval service by Secor and Co., of Jersey City, New Jersey. Since the logs for its first period of service are missing—presumably lost when a torpedo (naval mine) sank it—there is no record of Althea's commissioning date. Still, on 24 April 1864 Secretary of the Navy Gideon Welles ordered the commandant of the New York Navy Yard to hurry the tug to Rear Admiral David Glasgow Farragut who then was trying to build up his West Gulf Blockading Squadron for an attack on Mobile, Alabama.

About this time, however, Lieutenant General Ulysses S. Grant was preparing to launch a two-pronged campaign against Richmond, Virginia: driving south from the Rapidan River with the Army of the Potomac toward the Confederate capital and simultaneously ascending the James River, with a force under Major General Benjamin F. Butler, for an amphibious landing at Bermuda Hundred, Virginia, to begin a push through Petersburg, Virginia.

The destructive foray of the Confederate ironclad ram CSS Albemarle from the Roanoke River into Albemarle Sound, North Carolina, on 17 April and her reappearance on 5 May—the day Grant's offensives began—increased Union anxiety over the possibility that the Confederate squadron at Richmond might descend the James, wrest control of that vital stream from the Union flotilla, and wreck Butler's transports and supply ships, stranding his troops in hostile territory where they would be at the mercy of Southern soldiers. To prevent such an eventuality, Welles sent several warships, formerly ordered to the Gulf of Mexico, to Hampton Roads, Virginia, to reinforce the James River Flotilla.

Althea was one of these ships. While the date of her departure from New York City is not known, the tug was said to be serving on the James in the dispatch dated 17 June 1864 which reported the locations of the ships of the North Atlantic Blockading Squadron. She had been fitted out with a spar torpedo to be used in attacking any Confederate ironclad which might appear and she was prepared to act as a ram should an opportunity for such employment arise. The tug also served as a tender to Union ironclads in the James.

=== Gulf service ===
Late in July, the situation in that river seemed stable enough to permit the Union warships borrowed from Farragut to move on to the Gulf of Mexico. Repaired and prepared for sea by the Norfolk Navy Yard, Althea departed Hampton Roads in company with three other tugs on the 26th and reached Mobile Bay on 5 August, the day of Farragut's great victory there.

Too late to participate in the historic Battle of Mobile Bay, Althea busied herself in ensuing months supporting Farragut's combatant ships as they joined Army forces in operations against the city of Mobile, Alabama. On 12 April, the day Mobile finally surrendered, Althea struck a torpedo (naval mine) in the Blakeley River and sank while returning from a run up that stream in which she had dragged primitive sweep gear in an effort to clear the channels of explosive devices. Two members of her crew were killed in the accident, and three others—including the tug's commanding officer, Acting Ensign Frederick A. G. Bacon—were wounded.

Raised and repaired after the Confederate collapse, Althea was recommissioned at Mobile on 7 November 1865. She carried out towing chores and performed other varied services there, at Pensacola, Florida, and at Key West, Florida, until—towing the monitor USS Sangamon – she departed the latter port on 10 April 1866. After reaching the Philadelphia Navy Yard on the 18th, she was decommissioned on 25 April 1866 and sold at auction on 8 December 1866.

=== Commercial service ===
Redocumented Martin Kalbfleisch on 10 January 1868, she served as a merchant tug until 1896.
