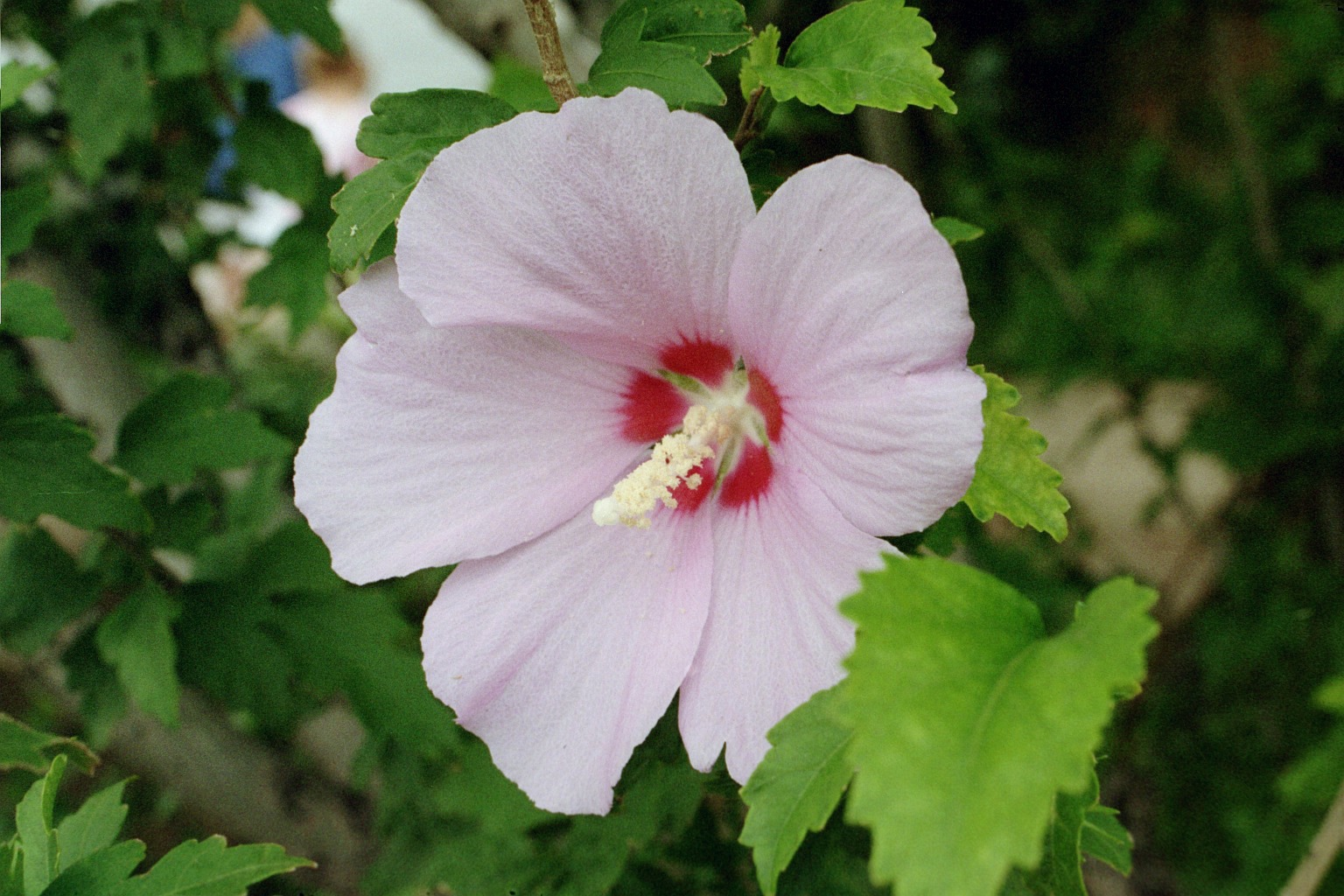

Scientific classification
- Kingdom: Plantae
- Clade: Tracheophytes
- Clade: Angiosperms
- Clade: Eudicots
- Clade: Rosids
- Order: Malvales
- Family: Malvaceae
- Genus: Hibiscus
- Species: H. syriacus

Binomial name
- Hibiscus syriacus L.

Synonyms
- List: Althaea frutex Mill.; Hibiscus acerifolius Salisb.; Hibiscus rhombifolius Cav.; Ketmia syriaca (L.) Scop.; Ketmia syrorum Medik. nom. illeg.

= Hibiscus syriacus =

Species of flowering plant

Hibiscus syriacus is a species of flowering plant in the mallow family, Malvaceae. It is native to areas of east Asia, but widely introduced elsewhere, including much of Europe and North America. It was given the epithet syriacus because it had been collected from gardens in Syria. Common names include the rose of Sharon (especially in North America), Syrian ketmia, shrub althea (or simply althea), Korean rose and rose mallow (in the United Kingdom). It is the national flower of South Korea and is mentioned in the South Korean national anthem.

== Description ==
Hibiscus syriacus is a hardy deciduous shrub. It is upright and vase-shaped, reaching 2–4 m (7–13 feet) in height, bearing large trumpet-shaped flowers with prominent yellow-tipped white stamens. The flowers are often pink in color, but can also be dark pink (almost purple), light pink or white. Individual flowers are short-lived, lasting only a day. However, numerous buds produced on the shrub's new growth provide prolific flowering over a long summer blooming period. The soil in which the Hibiscus thrives is moist but well-drained, and organically rich. Hibiscus syriacus is highly tolerant of air pollution, heat, humidity, poor soil and drought. The species has naturalized very well in many suburban areas and might even be termed slightly invasive, so frequently does it seed.

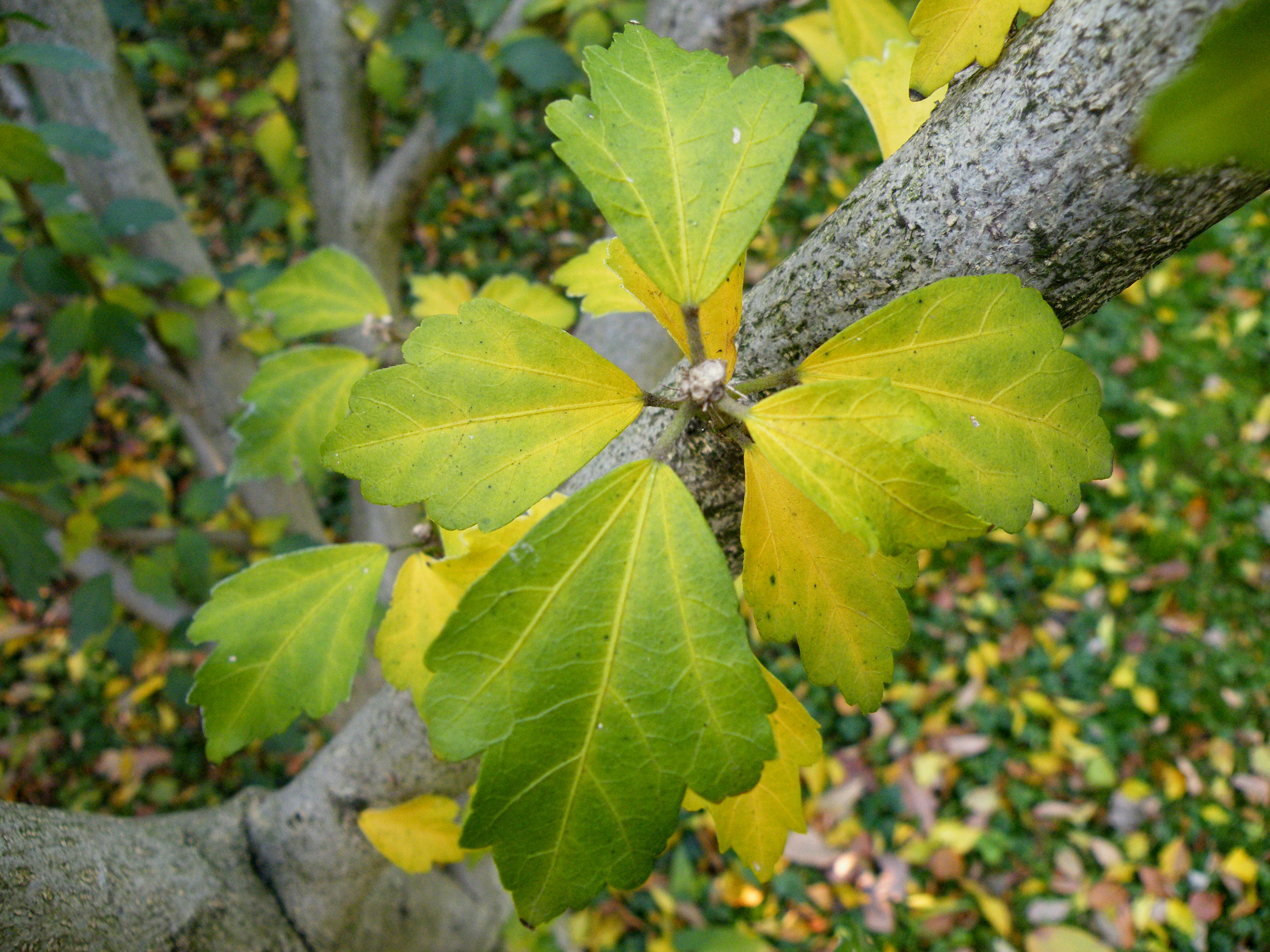
Leaves

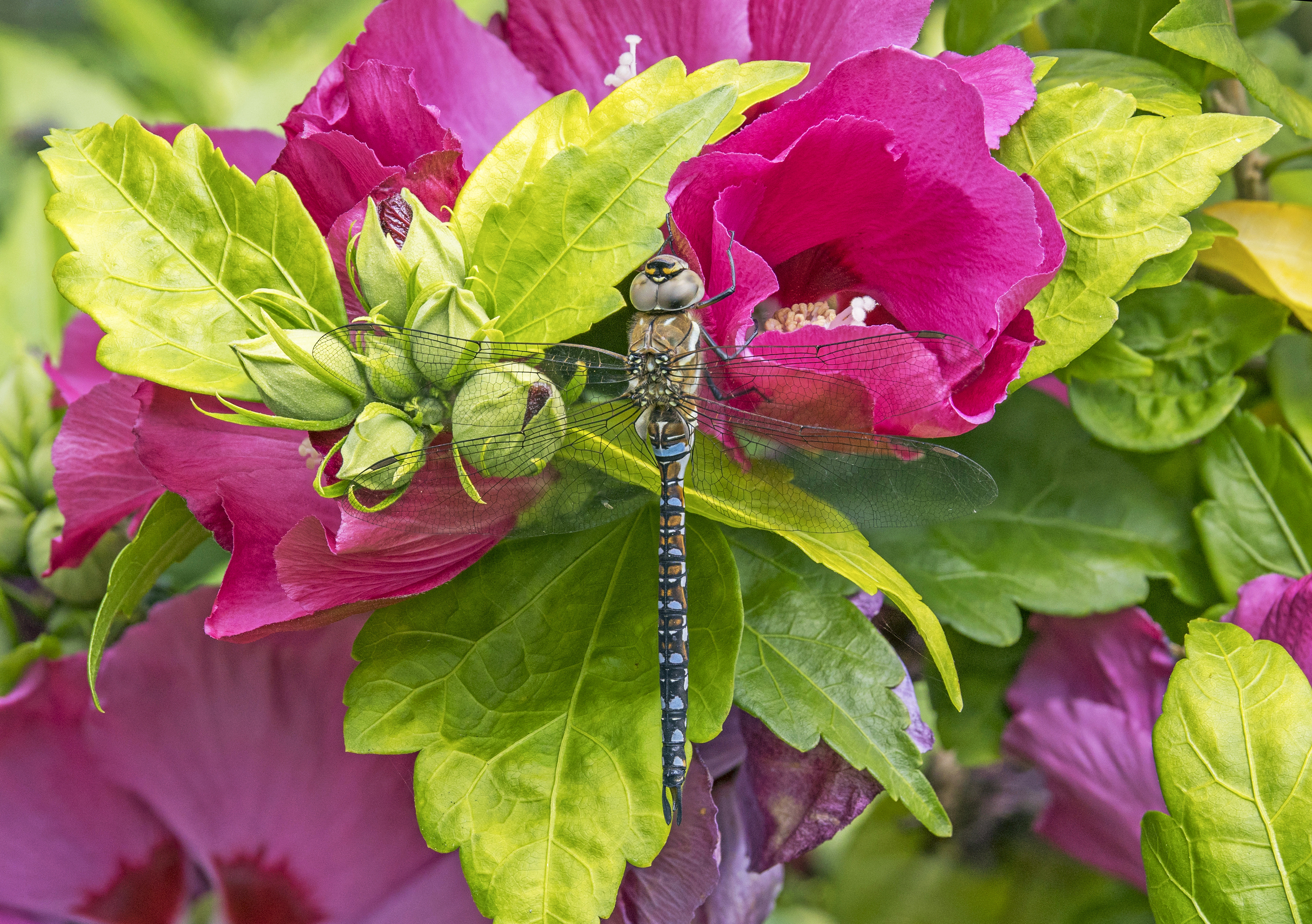
Hibiscus syriacus flower with Migrant hawker (Aeshna mixta)

=== Growth ===
The branches are thin and gray, white-lenticeled, with raised leaf scars and small buds. Stems and branches do not branch very much unless pruned, resulting in many long, straight stems that originate from about 1.5–4 cm (0.5–1.5 inches) above the ground, giving rise to the shrub's overall vase shape. The leaves appear unusually late in the season, in May. They are usually green or yellowish green, alternate, broadly ovate, palmately veined, and 7.5 cm (3 inches) long. They have three distinct lobes with coarsely-toothed margins.

=== Flowers ===
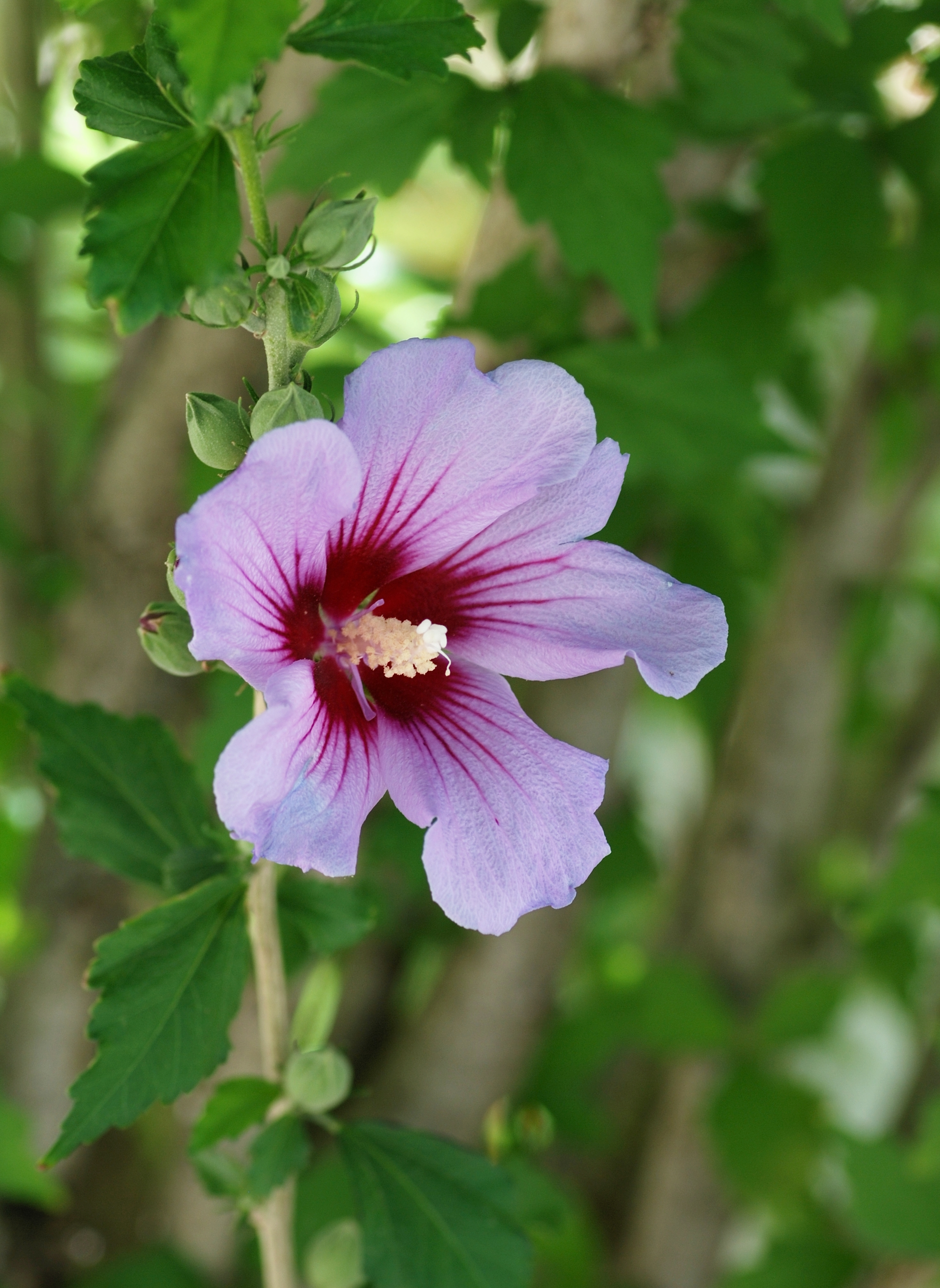
Hibiscus syriacus 'Oiseau Bleu'

Hibiscus syriacus has 5-petaled flowers (to 7.5 cm or 3 inches diameter) in solid colors of white, red, purple, mauve, violet, or blue, or bicolors with a different colored throat, depending upon the cultivar. Extending from the base of these five petals is the pistil at the center, with the stamen around it. These basic characteristics give the H. syriacus flower and its many variants their distinctive form. The plant can bloom continuously from July through September, usually at night. With maturity, flexible plant stems become weighted under the load of prolific summer flowers, and bend over halfway to the ground.

=== Fruits and seeds ===
Most modern cultivars are virtually fruitless. The fruits of those that have them are green or brown, unornamental 5-valved dehiscent capsules, which persist throughout much of the winter. They split over the course of the dormant season and spread their easily germinating seeds around the base of the parent plant, thus forming colonies with time.

== Cultivation ==
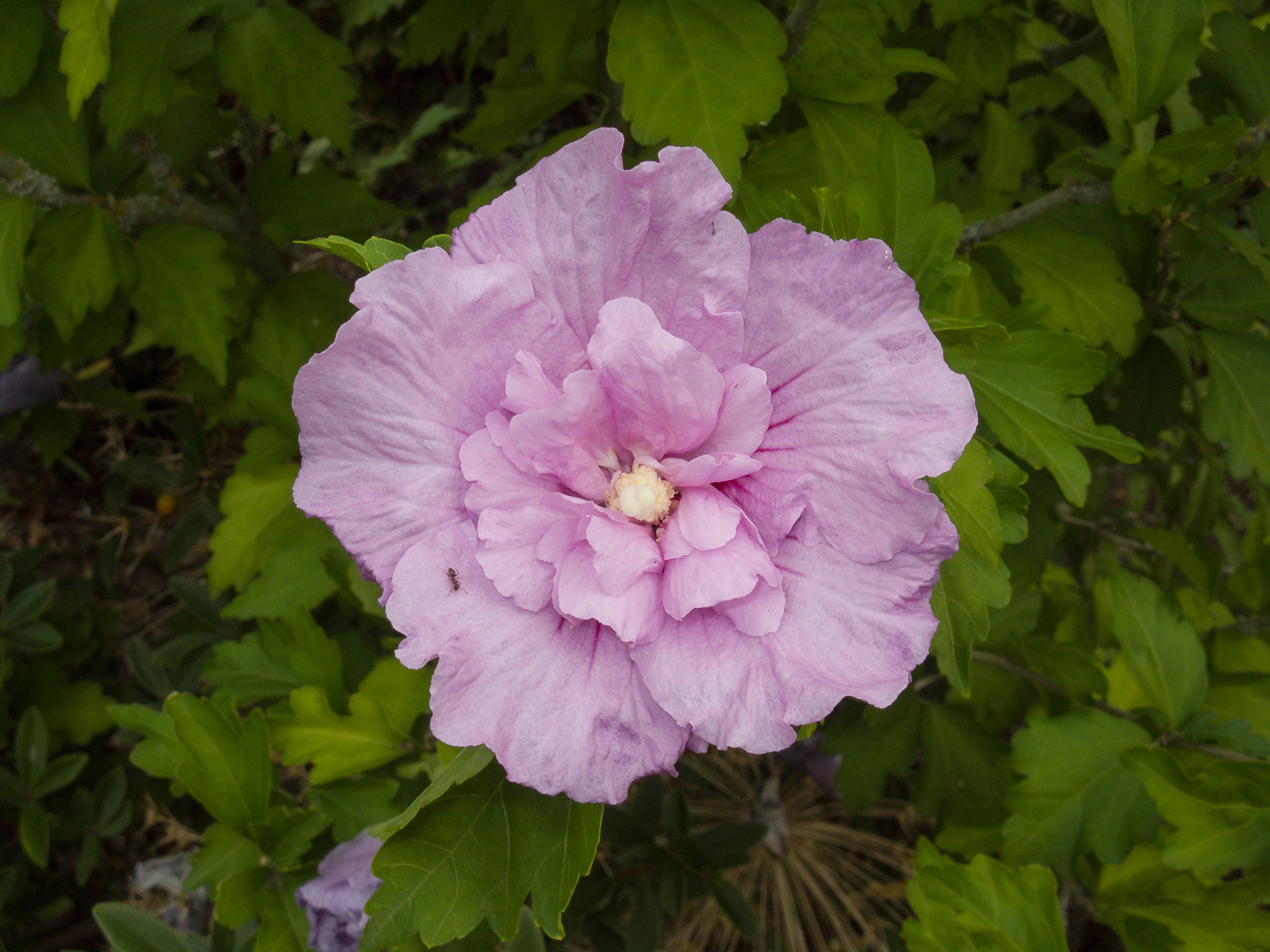
Flower of Hibiscus syriacus 'Notwoodone'

Though it has no fall color and can be stiff and ungainly if badly pruned, H. syriacus remains a popular ornamental shrub today, with many cultivars. Full-grown plants can tolerate a wide range of conditions, including frost, drought and urban pollution. However, the best results are produced in a warm, sheltered position; a well-drained neutral soil; and full sun.

=== Propagation ===
Hibiscus syriacus is fairly easily propagated from either seeds, with variable results, or by layering or cuttings, cloning the original.

=== Pests and diseases ===
Old shrubs can develop trunk cankers that may eventually prove fatal to the plant. The plant has some susceptibility to leaf spots, blights, rusts and canker. Japanese beetles, whiteflies and aphids are occasional insect visitors. Japanese beetles can severely damage foliage if left unchecked.

=== Cultivars ===
Flower of Hibiscus syriacus 'Hamabo'

The following cultivars have gained the Royal Horticultural Society's Award of Garden Merit:

- 'Blue Chiffon' ('Notwood3') (blue, semi-double)
- 'Diana' (single, white)
- 'Hamabo' (pale pink, red centre)
- 'Lavender Chiffon' ('Notwoodone') (pale lilac)
- 'Meehanii' (pink, variegated leaves)
- 'Oiseau Bleu' ('Blue Bird') (blue-violet, maroon centre)
- 'Red Heart' (white, red centre)
- 'White Chiffon' ('Notwoodtwo') (white, double)
- 'William R. Smith' (white, single)
- 'Woodbridge' (deep pink)

== National flower ==
The Presidential Standard of South Korea, with a pair of phoenixes flanking the Korean rose.

Hibiscus syriacus, also known as the Korean rose, is the national flower of South Korea. The flower appears in various national emblems, and Korea is compared poetically to the flower in the South Korean national anthem. The flower's name in Korean is mugunghwa (Korean: 무궁화; Hanja: 無窮花), which translates to "eternal blossom that never fades". It is also known as mokkeunhwa (목근화; 木槿花). Professor emeritus at Ohio State University, Chan E. Park, notes that, to many Koreans, the flower was a symbol of resistance to Japanese colonial rule. South Korean law also defined the flagpole used for hoisting national flag should be surmounted by a ball that has the shape of the flower's calyx.

== History and culture ==
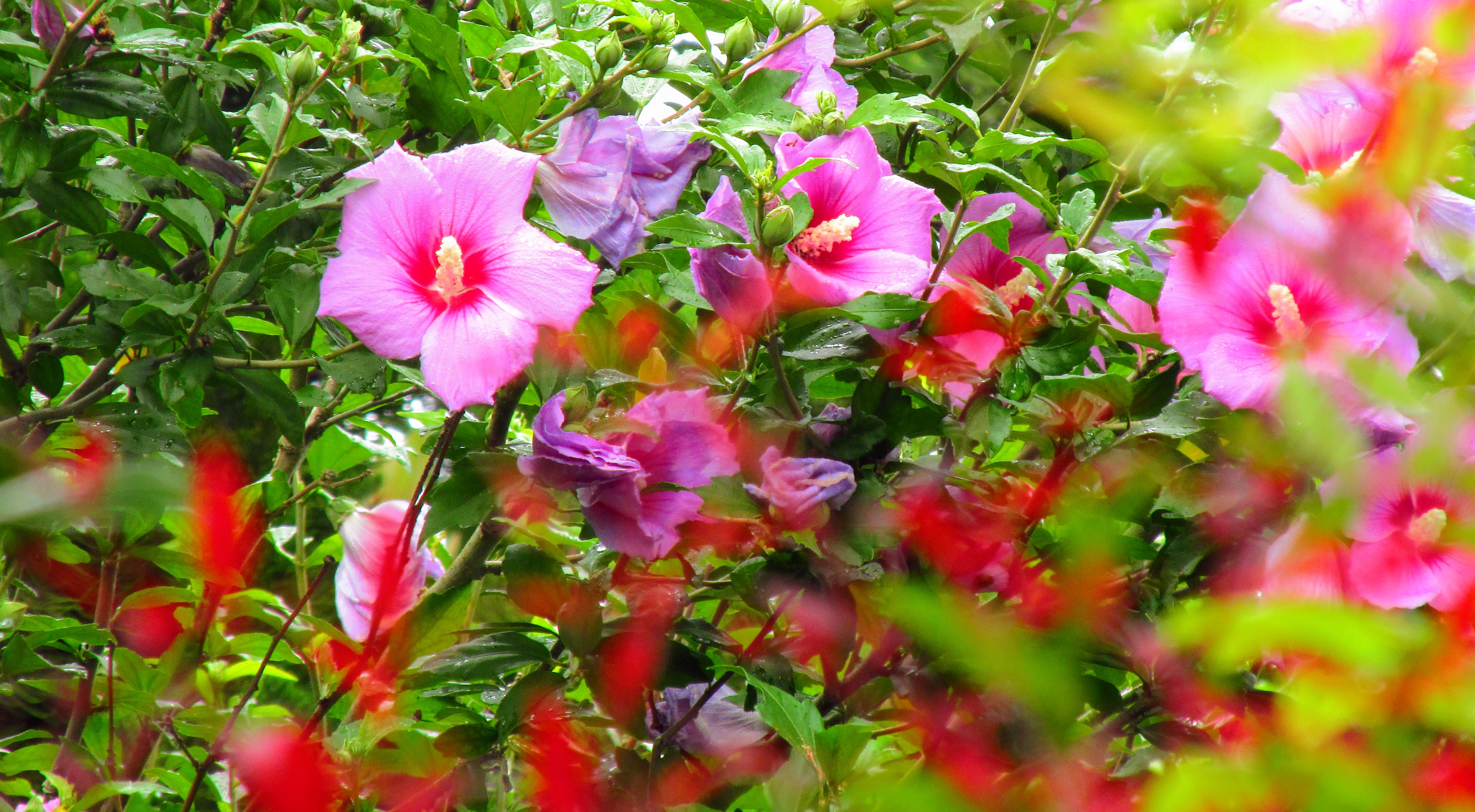
The hibiscus has been a popular garden tree for Japanese households from the 8th century onwards.

Hibiscus syriacus was originally endemic to Korea. It was brought to Japan in the 8th century and cultivated for horticulture. The oldest record of Hibiscus syriacus growing abundantly on the Korean Peninsula can be found in the ancient Chinese geographical text Shan Hai Jing (山海經), written between the 8th and 3rd centuries BC. Its leaves were brewed into a herbal infusion and its flowers eaten in Korea. Later on it was introduced and grown in the gardens of Europe as early as the 16th century, though as late as 1629 John Parkinson thought it was tender and took great precautions with it, thinking it "would not suffer to be uncovered in the Winter time, or yet abroad in the Garden, but kept in a large pot or tubbe in the house or in a warme cellar, if you would have them to thrive." (sic) By the end of the 17th century, some knew it to be hardy: Gibson, describing Lord Arlington's London house noted six large earthen pots coddling the "tree hollyhock", as he called it, "that grows well enough in the ground". By the 18th century the shrub was common in English gardens and in the North American colonies, known as Althea frutex and "Syrian ketmia".
