= Jong Il Peak =

Peak of Mount Sobaek in North Korea

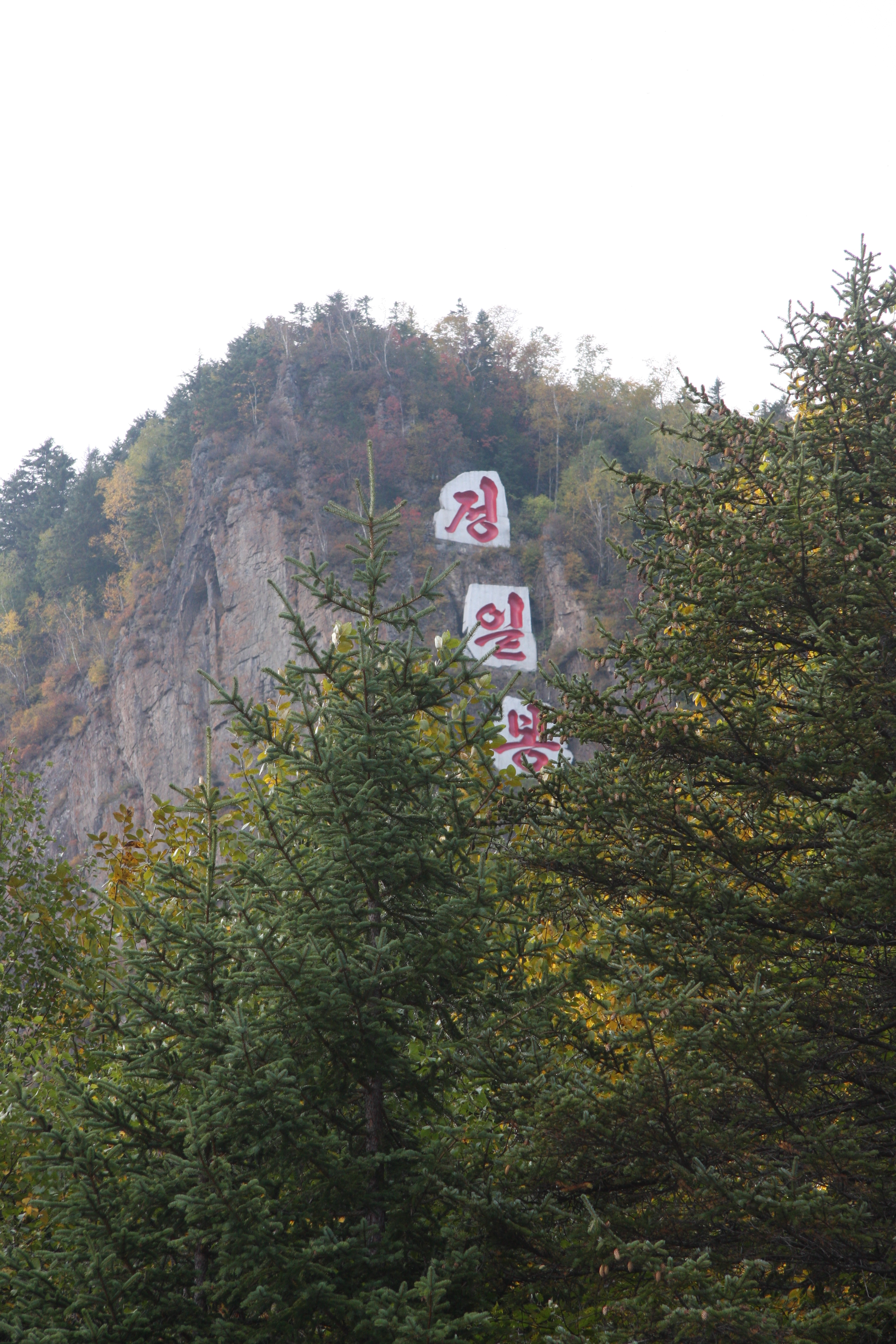
- Jong Il Peak in September 2008

Highest point
- Elevation: 5,899 ft (1,798 m)
- Parent peak: Sobaeksan
- Coordinates: 41°51′50.68″N 128°09′19.84″E

Naming
- Native name: 정일봉 (Korean)

Geography
- Country: North Korea
- Province: Ryanggang
- County: Samjiyon
- Parent range: Changbai Mountains

Korean name
- Hangul: 정일봉
- Hanja: 正日峰
- RR: Jeongilbong
- MR: Chŏngilbong

Jong Il Peak (Korean: 정일봉) is one of the peaks of Mount Sobaek, south-east of Paektu Mountain. The height is 5,899 ft (1,798 m). It is located near the shore of Sobaek Stream, in Samjiyon County, Ryanggang Province, North Korea.

The main rocks of the peak are trachyte, rhyolite and basalt. The southern slope is a cliff about 328 ft (100 m) height, at the foot of the rock of 30–35° slope is a thick layer of scree, which is connected with the alluvial soil of the valley of Sobaek Stream. The flat northern slope is connected with Saja Peak. The Eastern slope is steeper than the western. At the Chŏng-il Peak, which is surrounded by dense forest, over 300 species of plants grow, including 16 species of trees and 40 species of shrubs. There are Manchurian Fir, Jezo Spruce and Olgan Larch growing around the peak, and well as Royal Azalea, Rhododendron mucronulatum and Japanese Rowan on the southern slope.

== History ==
Initially, the peak was named Changsu. In 1930–1940, there was the secret camp of anti-Japanese guerrillas under with the rate of the Korean People's Revolutionary Army. According to the official North Korean historiography, Kim Jong Il was born there. In 1988, the peak was renamed in his honor. A "Revolutionary Historic Site" was arranged at the territory of the former camp. Three granite plates with the name of peak, carved in red letters, were constructed on the southern rock. In 1992, for the Kim Jong Il's 50th anniversary, a memorial plate with congratulatory ode "To the Shining Star" by Kim Il Sung was placed near the camp.

It is one of the most important sites of Paektu. Since 1988, 200,000 North Koreans have visited the peak each year "to chant the oath of loyalty to Kim Jong Il". There are lot of literary works in North Korea carolling Jong Il Peak. O Yŏng-jae has writing about the peak in 6th chapter of "Sons of the people" (1991). "Oh, Jong Il Peak" by Chŏn Byŏng-gu (1989) and "Thunder over Jong Il Peak" by An Jong-ho were dedicated to the peak. The Pochonbo Electronic Ensemble also released the song "Snowstorm on Jong Il Peak" in 1998.
