= Changbai =

Changbai may refer to:

- Changbai Mountains, mountain range on the border between China and North Korea
- Changbai Mountain, or Baekdu Mountain, volcanic mountain on the border between North Korea and China
- Changbai Waterfall, in Baekdu Mountain in the Changbai Mountains
- Changbai Korean Autonomous County, in Jilin, China
