= Military Foundation Day =

Public holiday in North Korea

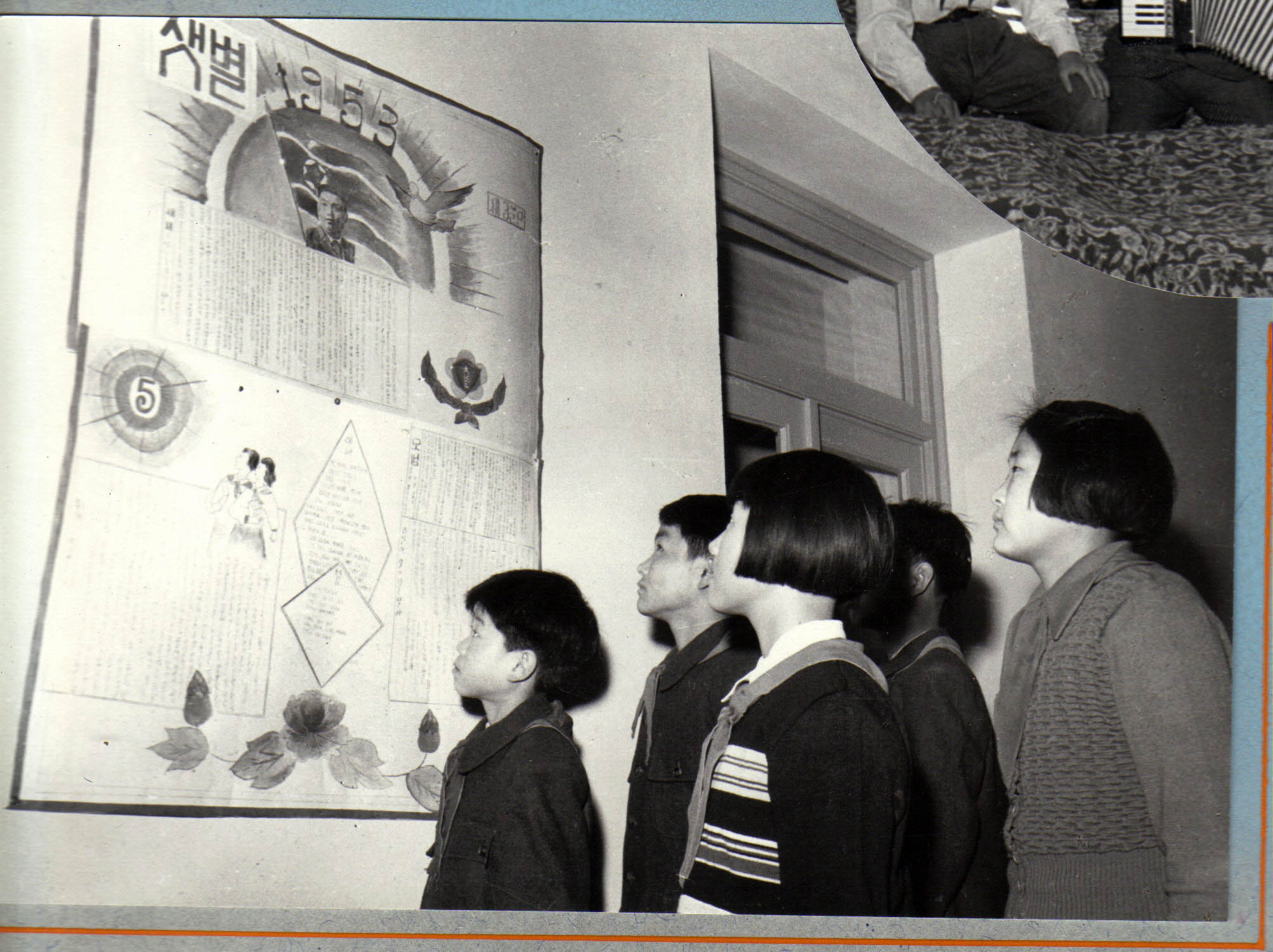
- Military Foundation Day anniversary of 1953
- Also called: Army Day
- Observed by: North Korea
- Observances: Visits to statues of Kim Il Sung and his mausoleum, fireworks, performances, sports competitions, folk dances
- Date: 8 February
- Next time: 8 February 2027
- Frequency: annual
- Related to: Day of the Shining Star (16 February), Day of the Sun (15 April), Foundation Day (9 September), Party Foundation Day (10 October), Constitution Day (27 December)

Military Foundation Day (Korean: 조선인민군 창건일) is an annual public holiday in North Korea falling on 8 February.

== Background ==
Flag of the Korean People's Revolutionary Army (KPRA)

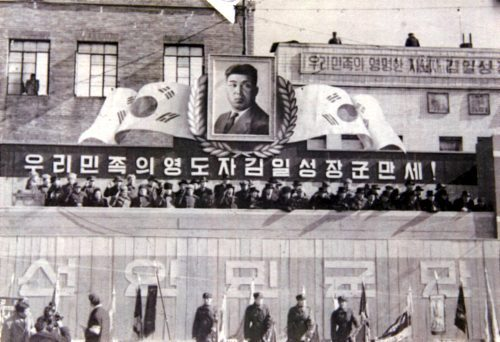
Foundation of the Korean People's Army (KPA) on 8 February 1948

External videos
- People's Army (1948)

North Korean historiography has two competing dates for the founding of the modern Korean People's Army (KPA): 25 April 1932 and 8 February 1948. According to North Korean historiography, the Korean People's Revolutionary Army (KPRA) – the predecessor of the KPA – was founded on 25 April 1932. The KPRA was the name for Korean units of the Northeast Anti-Japanese United Army and the regular KPA was not established until 1948, with its date of 8 February becoming a holiday for the formal military's founding until celebrations ceased in 1978, to be replaced by 25 April. The 25 April date had, however, been celebrated in one way or the other since 1962. Initially it was celebrated as the founding of "anti-Japanese guerrilla units" in general, and later as the founding of the KPRA, in particular. It became an official holiday in 1996. The 25 April occasion was commemorated as the sole day for the army's foundation from 1978 until 2015, whereupon Kim Jong Un restored 8 February as the Army Day celebration alongside Military Foundation Day. by a formal decision of the Politburo of the Central Committee of the Workers' Party of Korea.

== History ==
On 21 April 1992, four days before the 25 April Military Foundation Day, Kim Jong Il was given the title of wonsu (marshal) in the army. There was a huge parade on the Military Foundation Day that year. At the parade, announced to the public: "Bring glory to the heroic people's military". This was the first and only recording of him speaking publicly. Since 23 April 1996, Military Foundation Day has been an official holiday.

== Celebrations ==
Celebrations of the Military Foundation Day are extensive. The country holds a commemorative assembly in the capital as well as various commemorative events, demonstrations, concerts and a military parade. Servicemen of the armed forces and civilians alike are permitted to take off from work to celebrate the holiday and the service of the KPA in the defense of the nation. During the 2012 celebrations a banquet was held at the Mokran House (Banquet Hall 7) in the Ch'anggwang-dong of Chung-guyok neighbourhood. During the 2023 celebrations, in addition to the military parade, Kim Jong Un paid a visit to the "lodging quarters of generals of the Korean People's Army" according to the North Korean media and participated in a banquet together with his wife Ri Sol-ju and his daughter Kim Ju Ae. but the location was identified Yanggakdo Hotel.

=== Military parade of the Korean People's Army and the Worker-Peasant Red Guards ===
The semiannual parade, which was a feature of the day since the first parade of 1948, is a key highlight of the national celebrations in Pyongyang. Since 1958, parades have been held on the city's Kim Il-sung Square in honor of the holiday every 5 years, following Chinese practice. The first parade was in 1948 at Pyongyang Station which included the attendance of Soviet generals and the participation of about 20,000 North Korean soldiers. In 1992, the diamond jubilee parade was held.

== See also ==
- April 25 House of Culture
- April 25 SC
