= Longwanqun National Forest Park =

National Park in Jilin, China

Coordinates: 42.342813°N 126.407146°E

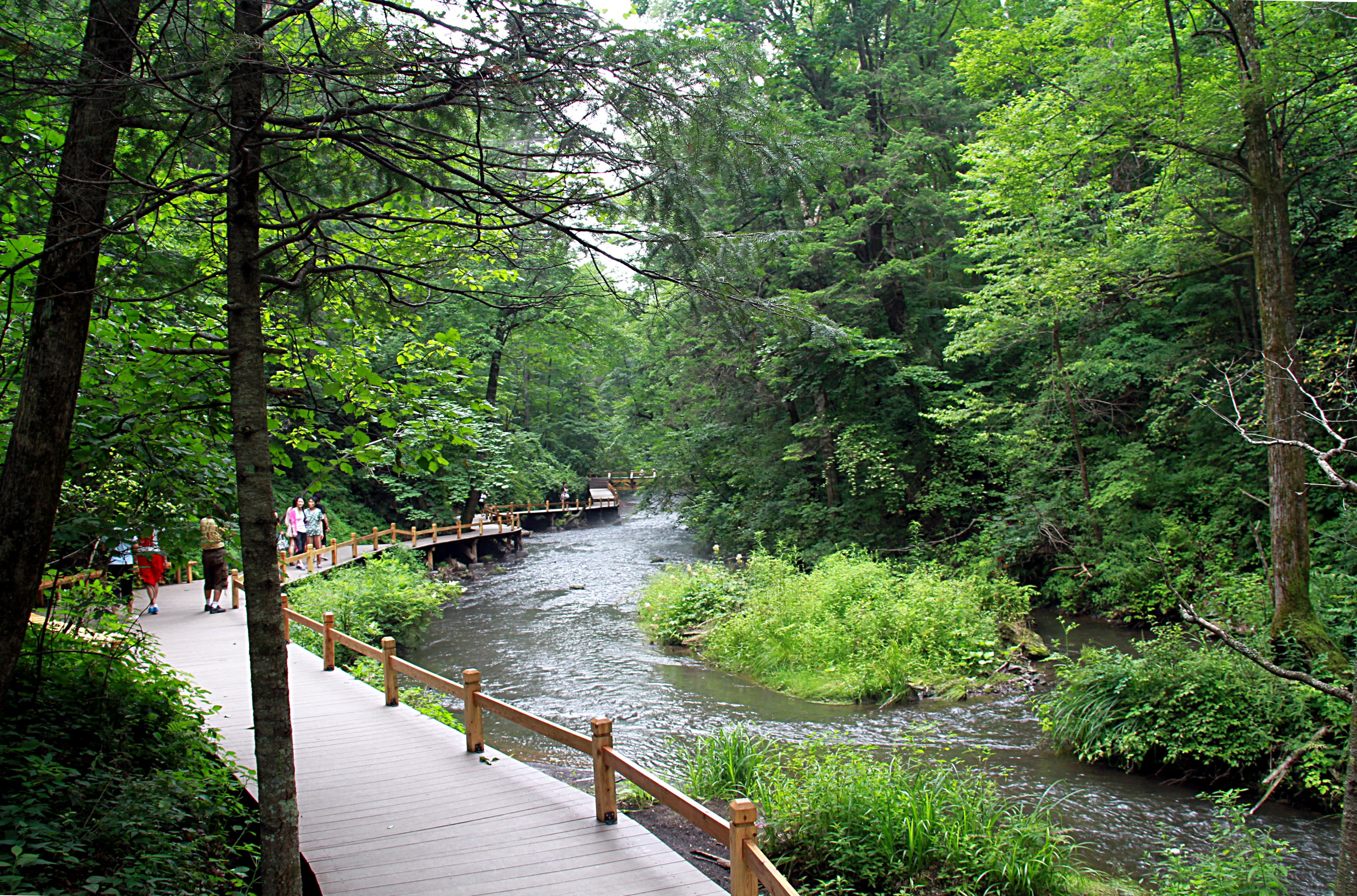
Creek near the Diaoshuihu Waterfall inside the forest park

Longwanqun National Forest Park (Chinese: 龙湾群国家森林公园; pinyin: Lóngwānqún Guójiā Sēnlín Gōngyuán) is a nationally protected nature area in Huinan County, Jilin, China. Geographically, it is part of the western Changbai Mountains. A notable feature of the park are a group of volcanic crater lakes: the Sanjiaolong Crater Lake (三角龙湾, Triangle Dragon Crater Lake), Dalong Crater Lake (大龙湾, Big Dragon Crater Lake), Erlong Crater Lake (Medium Dragon Crater Lake), Xiaolong Crater Lake (Small Dragon Crater Lake), Donglong Crater Lake (East Dragon Crater Lake), Nanlong Crater Lake (South Dragon Crater Lake), Hanlong Crater Lake (Dry Dragon Crater Lake). The park is located in the Manchurian mixed forests ecoregion.
