= Mount Paektu =

Mountain on the China–North Korea border

- Mount Baekdu (Korea); Changbai Mountain, Changbaek Mountain (China)
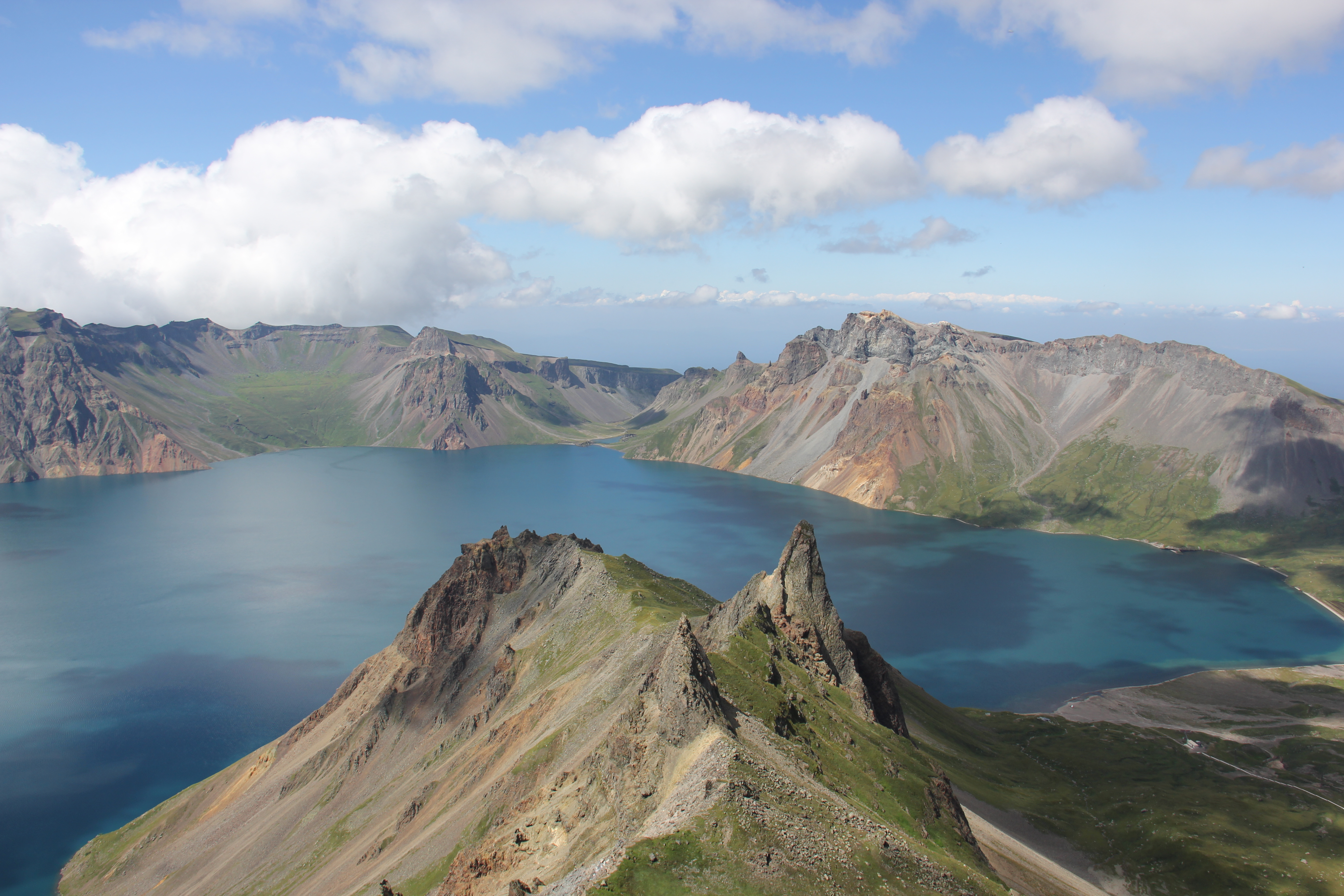
- The summit caldera of Mount Paektu, with Heaven Lake

Highest point
- Elevation: 2,744 m (9,003 ft)
- Prominence: 2,593 m (8,507 ft)
- Listing: Country high point Ultra
- Coordinates: 41°59′36″N 128°04′39″E

Geography
- Location: Samjiyon, Ryanggang, North Korea; Fusong County and Antu County, Jilin, China
- Parent range: Changbai Mountains

Geology
- Mountain type: Stratovolcano
- Last eruption: March 1903

Chinese name
- Simplified Chinese: 长白山
- Traditional Chinese: 長白山
- Literal meaning: ever-white mountain
Transcriptions
Standard Mandarin
- Hanyu Pinyin: Chángbáishān
- Wade–Giles: Ch'ang-pai-shan

Korean name
- Chosŏn'gŭl: 백두산
- Hancha: 白頭山
- Literal meaning: white head mountain
Transcriptions
- Revised Romanization: Baekdusan
- McCune–Reischauer: Paektusan

Chinese Korean name
- Chosŏn'gŭl: 장백산
- Hancha: 長白山
- Literal meaning: ever-white mountain
Transcriptions
- Revised Romanization: Jangbaeksan
- McCune–Reischauer: Changbaeksan

Manchu name
- Manchu script: ᡤᠣᠯᠮᡳᠨ ᡧᠠᠩᡤᡳᠶᠠᠨ ᠠᠯᡳᠨ
- Romanization: Golmin Šanggiyan Alin

Mount Paektu or Mount Baekdu (Korean: 백두산) is an active stratovolcano on the Chinese–North Korean border. In China, it is known as Changbai Mountain (Chinese: 长白山, Chinese Korean: 장백산). At 2,744 m (9,003 ft), it is the tallest mountain in North Korea and Northeast China and the tallest mountain of the Baekdu-daegan and Changbai mountain ranges. The highest peak, called Janggun Peak, belongs to North Korea. The mountain notably features a caldera that contains a large crater lake called Heaven Lake, which serves as the source of the Songhua, Tumen, and Yalu rivers. Korean and Manchu people assign a mythical quality to the mountain and its lake, and consider the mountain to be their ancestral homeland.

The mountain's caldera was formed by an eruption in 946 that released about 100–120 km^{3} (24–29 cu mi) of tephra. It was among the largest and most powerful eruptions on Earth in the last 5,000 years. The volcano last erupted in 1903, and is expected to erupt roughly once every hundred years. In the 2010s, concerns over an upcoming eruption prompted several countries to commission research into when the volcano might next erupt. The mountain is considered culturally important to multiple groups in the area, including Korean, Chinese, and Manchu people. The mountain is a major national symbol for both North and South Korea, and is mentioned in both national anthems and depicted on the national emblem of North Korea. The Manchu people also consider the mountain their ancestral homeland, and the Chinese Qing dynasty saw it as a symbol of imperial power. The mountain had been subject to territorial disputes over the past few centuries. In the late 20th century, the states of China and North Korea diplomatically agreed to joint custody.

== Names ==
The mountain was first recorded in the Chinese Classic of Mountains and Seas under the name Bùxiánshān (不咸山). It is also called Shànshàndàlǐng (單單大嶺) in the Book of the Later Han. In the Book of Wei and the Book of Sui it is also referred to as Dutàishān (徒太山), which is also mentioned as Cóngtàishān (從太山) in the History of the Northern Dynasties, likely as a misspelling of Dutàishān. In the New Book of Tang, it was called Tàibáishān (太白山). The current Chinese name, Chángbáishān (长白山; 長白山; 'ever white mountain'), was first used in the Liao dynasty (916–1125) of the Khitans and then the Jin dynasty (1115–1234) of the Jurchens. The Liao Shi recorded that chiefs of 30 Jurchen tribes from Mount Changbai paid their tribute to the Liao in AD 985. According to the Song dynasty travelogue Songmo Jiwen, it was named as such because the mountain was "the abode of the white-robed Guanyin" and its birds and beasts were all white. The modern Manchu name of the mountain, which is golmin šanggiyan alin (ᡤᠣᠯᠮᡳᠨ ᡧᠠᠩᡤᡳᠶᠠᠨ ᠠᠯᡳᠨ), means 'long white mountain'.

The Korean name Baekdusan / Paektusan (백두산; 白頭山) first appears in literature in the 10th year of Seongjong of Goryeo (991) in the Goryeosa, compiled at the beginning of the Joseon period. It means 'white-head mountain'. In other records such as the Samguk yusa and the Jewang ungi it is also called Taebaeksan (태백산; 太白山), which means 'great-white mountain'. It was also occasionally called Changbaeksan (長白山) and Baeksan (白山) in the Veritable Records of the Joseon Dynasty. An alternative Chinese name, Báitóushān (白头山; 白頭山), is the transliteration of Baekdusan.

The Mongolian name is Öndör Tsagaan Aula (Өндөр Цагаан Уул), which means 'lofty white mountain'. In English, various authors have used nonstandard transliterations.

== Current geography and geology ==
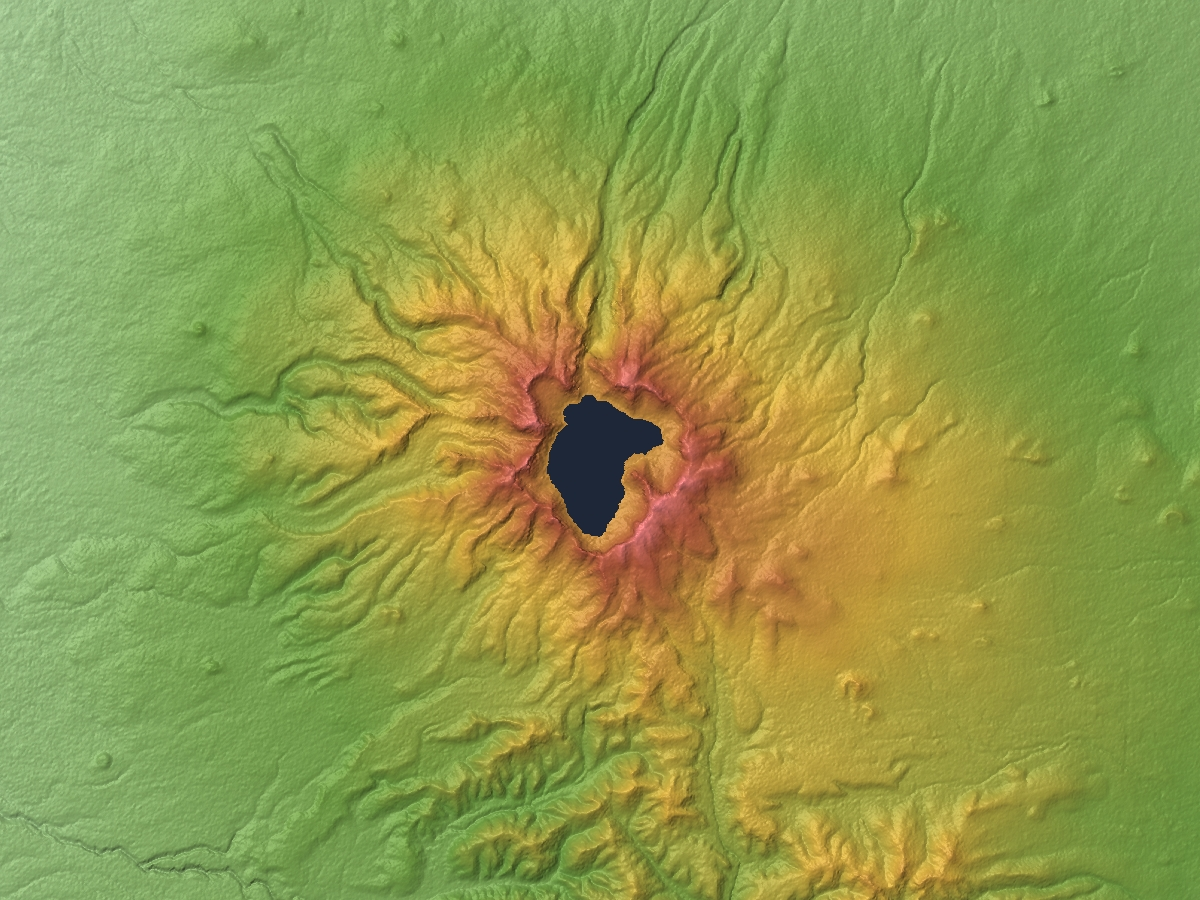
Relief map

Mount Paektu is 2,744 m (9,003 ft) tall, making it the highest mountain in North Korea and Northeast China and the highest mountain of the Baekdu-daegan and Changbai mountain ranges.

Mount Paektu is a stratovolcano whose cone is truncated by a significant caldera. The central section of the mountain rises about 3 mm (0.12 in) per year due to rising levels of magma below the central part of the mountain. Sixteen peaks exceeding 2,500 m (8,200 ft) line the caldera rim surrounding Heaven Lake. The highest peak, called Janggun Peak, is covered in snow about eight months of the year. The slope is relatively gentle until about 1,800 m (5,910 ft). The caldera is about 5 km (3.1 mi) wide and 850 meters (2,790 ft) deep, and is partially filled by the waters of Heaven Lake.

Heaven Lake has a circumference of 12 to 14 kilometers (7.5 to 8.7 mi), with an average depth of 213 meters (699 ft) and maximum depth of 384 meters (1,260 ft). From mid-October to mid-June, the lake is typically covered with ice. Water flows north out of the lake, and near the outlet there is a 70-meter (230 ft) waterfall. The mountain is the source of the Songhua, Tumen and Yalu rivers. The Tumen and the Yalu form the northern border between North Korea and Russia and China.

=== Climate ===
The weather on the mountain can be very erratic, sometimes severe. The annual average temperature at the peak is −4.9 °C (23.2 °F). During summer, temperatures of about 18 °C (64 °F) or higher can be reached, and during winter temperatures can drop to −48 °C (−54 °F). The lowest record temperature was −51 °C (−60 °F) on 2 January 1997. The average temperature is about −24 °C (−11 °F) in January, and 10 °C (50 °F) in July, remaining below freezing for eight months of the year. The average wind speed is 42 km/h (26 mph), peaking at 63 km/h (39 mph). The relative humidity averages 74%.

== Geological history ==
Observations have shown that the source of Paektu's volcanism is likely caused by hot partial melt material rising from a stagnant slab in the transition zone, this stagnant slab is indicated to be a piece of the currently subducting Pacific plate.

Beginning about 5 million years ago, Paekdu Mountain erupted, releasing a series of basaltic lava flows that formed a lava plateau. The construction of the cone of the volcano began approximately 1 million years ago, as the eruptive materials transitioned into trachytic, pyroclastic, and lava flows. During the cone-construction stage, major Plinian-type eruptions occurred 448, 67.6, 85.8 and 24.5 thousand years ago (ka) and deposited ash in the Sea of Japan. The cone's growth was halted by two widely-recognized major explosive eruptions: Tianwenfeng and Millennium.

=== Tianwenfeng eruption ===
The Tianwenfeng eruption was the formation of a widespread thick layer of grey, yellow pumice preceding the Millennium eruption. The exact age of the eruption is uncertain, since different dating techniques have assigned 4, 51, 61, and 74 ka to this deposit. This eruption formed large areas covered in yellow pumice and ignimbrite. Proximal deposits of pumice fall of the Tianwenfeng are thicker than those of the Millennium eruption. This suggests that the eruption of the Tianwenfeng is significant and maybe of similar magnitude to the Millennium eruption, making the Tianwenfeng eruption also of VEI 6–7.

=== Millennium eruption ===
The mountain's caldera was created in 946 by the colossal (VEI 6) "Millennium" or "Tianchi" eruption, one of the most powerful eruptions in the last 5,000 years, comparable to the 230 CE eruption of Lake Taupō and the 1815 eruption of Mount Tambora. The eruption, whose tephra has been found in the southern part of Hokkaido, Japan, and as far away as Greenland, destroyed much of the volcano's summit, leaving a caldera that today is filled by Heaven Lake.

According to the Korean historical record Goryeosa, in 946 "thunders from heaven's drum" were heard in the city of Kaesong, then the capital of Goryeo, about 450 km (280 mi) south of the volcano. The event reportedly terrified Jeongjong, 3rd monarch of Goryeo so much, that convicts were pardoned and set free. According to Kōfuku-ji Temple's historical records, on 3 November, "white ash rain" fell in Nara, Japan, about 1,100 km (680 mi) southeast from the mountain Three months later, on 7 February 947, explosive noises were reported in the city of Kyoto (Japan), about 1,000 km (620 mi) southeast of Paektu.

=== Later history ===
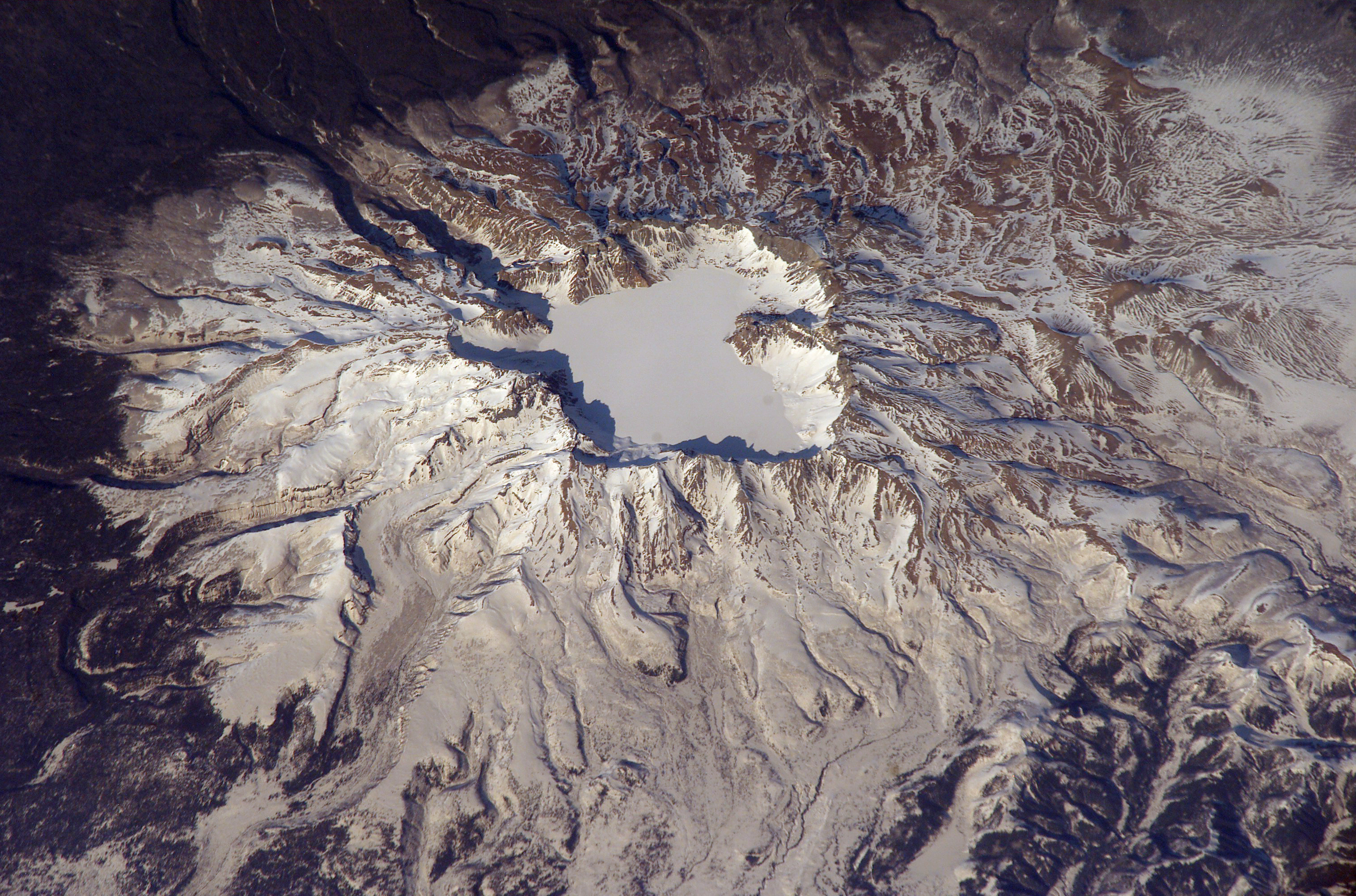
Mount Paektu, April 2003

After these major eruptions, Mount Paektu had at least three smaller eruptions, which occurred in 1668, 1702, and 1903, likely forming the Baguamiao ignimbrite, the Wuhaojie fine pumice, and the Liuhaojie tuff ring.

=== Research on upcoming eruption ===
In 2011, experts in North and South Korea met to discuss the potential for a significant eruption in the near future, as the last eruption was in 1903 and the volcano is expected to erupt around every 100 years. The Government of North Korea invited several volcanologists, including James Hammond, Clive Oppenheimer, and Kayla Iacovino, to study the mountain for recent volcanic activity. This made Iacovino the first foreign female researcher to conduct research in North Korea. The researchers began publishing their research in 2016 and in February 2020 formed the Mt. Paektu Research Center.

== Flora and fauna ==
There are five known species of plants in the lake on the peak, and some 168 have been counted along its shores. The forest on the Chinese side is ancient and almost unaltered by humans. Birch predominates near the tree line, and pine lower down, mixed with other species. There has been extensive deforestation on the lower slopes on the North Korean side of the mountain.

The area is a known habitat for Siberian tigers, bears, wolves, and wild boars. The Ussuri dholes may have been extirpated from the area. Deer in the mountain forests, which cover the mountain up to about 2,000 meters (6,600 ft), are of the Paekdusan roe deer kind. Many wild birds such as black grouse, owls, and woodpecker are known to inhabit the area. The mountain has been identified by BirdLife International as an Important Bird Area (IBA) because it supports a population of scaly-sided mergansers.

== Cultural history ==
The mountain has been worshipped by the surrounding peoples throughout history. A considerable percentage of the Koreans and Manchus consider it sacred, especially the Heaven Lake in its crater.

=== Korea ===
Mount Paektu on the national emblem of North Korea.

The mountain has been considered sacred by Koreans throughout history. According to Korean mythology, it was the birthplace of Dangun, the founder of Gojoseon (2333–108 BC), whose parents were said to be Hwanung, the Son of Heaven, and Ungnyeo, a bear who had been transformed into a woman. Many subsequent kingdoms of Korea, such as Buyeo, Goguryeo, Balhae, Goryeo and Joseon recognized this myth.

The Goryeo dynasty (936–1392) first called the mountain Baekdu, recording that the Jurchens across the Yalu River were made to live outside of Mount Baekdu. The Joseon dynasty (1392–1910) recorded volcanic eruptions in 1597, 1668, and 1702. In the 15th century, King Sejong strengthened the fortification along the Tumen and Yalu rivers, making the mountain a natural border with the northern peoples. Some Koreans claim that the entire region near Mount Paektu and the Tumen River belongs to Korea and parts of it were illegally given away by Japanese colonialists to China through the Gando Convention.

Mount Paektu is mentioned in the national anthems of both North and South Korea and in the Korean folk song "Arirang".

Dense forest around the mountain provided bases for Korean armed resistance against the Japanese occupation, and later communist guerrillas during the Korean War. Kim Il Sung organized his resistance against the Japanese forces there, and North Korea claims that Kim Jong Il was born there, although records outside of North Korea suggest that he was born in the Soviet Union.

The peak has been featured on the state emblem of North Korea since 1993, as defined in Article 169 of the Constitution, which describes Mt. Paektu as "the sacred mountain of the revolution". The mountain is often referred to in slogans such as: "Let us accomplish the Korean revolution in the revolutionary spirit of Paektu, the spirit of the blizzards of Paektu!" North Korean media celebrates natural phenomena witnessed at the mountain as portentous, and weather forecasts aired by state broadcaster Korean Central Television list Paektusan Secret Camp, claimed birthplace of Kim Jong Il, behind only the capital of Pyongyang. The mountain's name is used for various products, such as the Paektusan rocket, the Paektusan computer, and the Mt Paektu handgun.

In the 2019 South Korean disaster film Ashfall, the mountain erupts and causes severe earthquakes in the Korean peninsula.

=== China ===
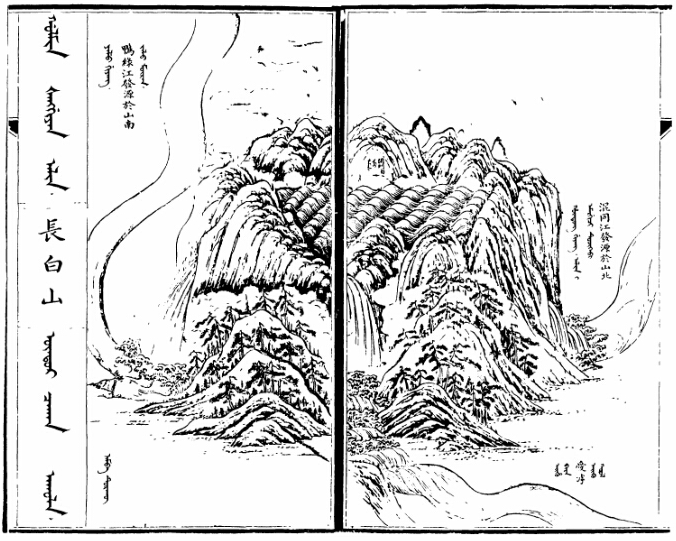
Painting from the Manchu Veritable Records with the names of Mount Paektu in Manchu, Chinese and Mongolian

Mount Changbai was regarded as the most sacred mountain in the shamanist religion of the Manchus, and their ancestors Sushen and Jurchens. The Jin dynasty bestowed the title "the King Who Makes the Nation Prosperous and Answers with Miracles" (興國靈應王) on the mountain in 1172 and it was entitled "the Emperor Who Cleared the Sky with Tremendous Sagehood" (開天宏聖帝) in 1193. A temple for the mountain god was constructed on the northern side.

The Manchu clan Aisin Gioro, which founded the Qing dynasty of China, claimed their progenitor Bukūri Yongšon was conceived near Mount Paektu. In 1682, 1698, 1733, 1754 and 1805, Qing emperors visited Jilin and paid homage to the mountain. The rites at Mount Changbai were heavily influenced by the ancient Feng Shan ceremonies, in which Chinese emperors offered sacrifices to heaven and earth at Mount Tai. The Kangxi Emperor claimed that Mount Tai and Changbai belong to the same mountain range, which runs from northeast to southwest but is partially submerged under the sea before reaching Shandong. The geography and feng shui of Mount Changbai thus provided legitimacy to the Aisin Gioro clan's rule over China.

Baishan Heishui, "white mountain and black river", referring to Mount Changbai and the Heilongjiang, has been a traditional name for Northeast China since the Jin dynasty.

== Sovereignty disputes ==
=== Historical ===
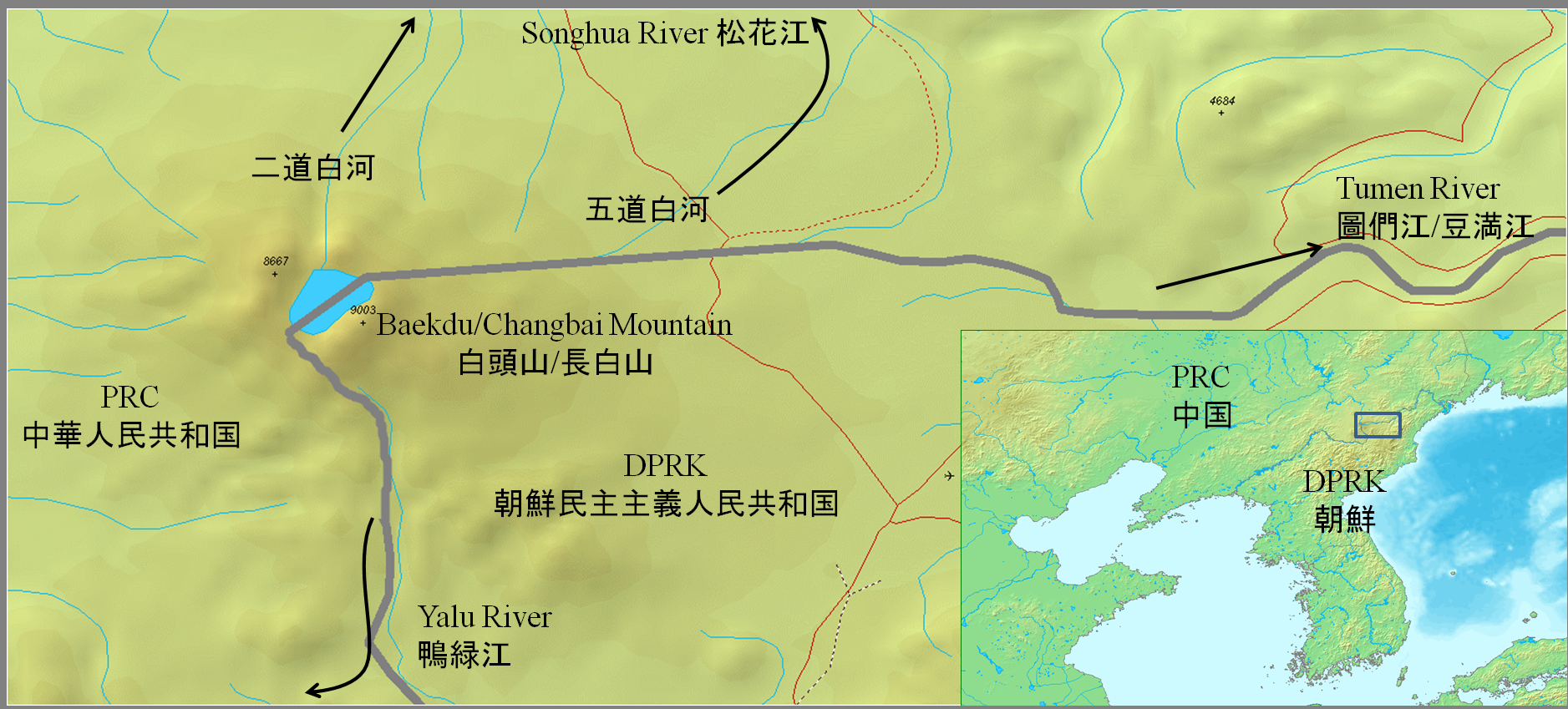
Map showing the Chinese-North Korean border region around Mount Paektu

According to Annals of the Joseon Dynasty, the Yalu and Tumen Rivers were set as the borders in the era of the founder of Joseon Dynasty, Taejo of Joseon (1335–1408). Because of the continuous entry of Korean people into Gando, a region in Manchuria that lay north of the Tumen, Manchu and Korean officials surveyed the area and negotiated a border agreement in 1712. To mark the agreement, they built a monument describing the boundary at a watershed, near the south of the crater lake at the mountain peak. Volume 8 of the Annals of King Taejo, 2nd article of Gyemyo, 14 December, 4th year of King Taejo, 1395, 28th year of Ming Hongwu Since the 19th century, interpretations of the inscription have been relevant in some territorial disputes.

The 1909 Gando Convention between China and Japan, when Korea was under Japanese rule, recognized the north and east of the mountain as Chinese territory.

=== Recent ===
In 1962 and 1964, China and North Korea negotiated two treaties in secret that outlined their modern borders. Both treaties especially focused on the sovereignty of Paektu and Heaven Lake. As a result of the treaties, North Korea received 280 km^{2} (110 mi^{2}) of land on and around Paektu, 9 out of 16 peaks, and 54.5% of Heaven Lake. Neither treaty is recognized by the governments of Taiwan or South Korea.

As of 2013, South Korea formally claimed the caldera lake and the inside part of the ridge. However, some South Korean groups argue that recent activities conducted on the Chinese side of the border, such as economic development, cultural festivals, infrastructure development, promotion of the tourism industry, attempts at registration as a World Heritage Site, and bids for a Winter Olympic Games, constitute attempts to claim the mountain as Chinese territory. These groups object to China's use of the name Mount Changbai. Some groups also regard the entire mountain as Korean territory that was given away by North Korea in the Korean War.

During the 2007 Asian Winter Games, which were held in Changchun, China, a group of South Korean athletes held up signs during the award ceremony which stated "Mount Paektu is our territory". Chinese sports officials delivered a letter of protest on the grounds that political activities violated the spirit of the Olympics and were banned in the charter of the International Olympic Committee and the Olympic Council of Asia. Officials from the South Korean athletic team apologized to China.

== Tourism ==
Most Chinese, Russian, South Korean and international visitors climb the mountain from the Chinese side. The North Korean side of the mountain is also popular among visitors to North Korea. The Chinese tourism area is classified as a AAAAA scenic area by the China National Tourism Administration.

There are a number of monuments on the North Korean side of the mountain. Paektu Spa is a natural spring and is used for bottled water. Pegae Hill is a camp site of the Korean People's Revolutionary Army allegedly led by Kim Il Sung during their struggle against Japanese colonial rule. Secret camps are also now open to the public. There are several waterfalls, including the Hyongje Falls which splits into two about a third of the way from the top. In 1992, on the occasion of the 80th birthday of Kim Il Sung, a large sign with the words "Holy mountain of the revolution" written in metal letters was erected on the side of the mountain. North Koreans claim that there are 216 steps leading to the top of the mountain, symbolizing Kim Jong Il's 16 February birth date, but this claim is disputed. On the North Korean side of the mountain, there is a funicular system with two cars. This was updated with new funicular cars built by the Kim Chong-t'ae Electric Locomotive Works, with the new cars successfully running on the funicular from 30 October 2020.

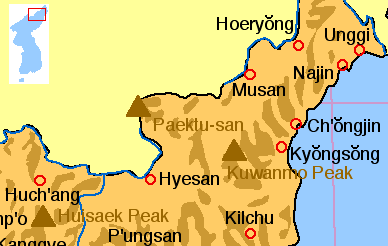
Mount Paektu's location in Korea

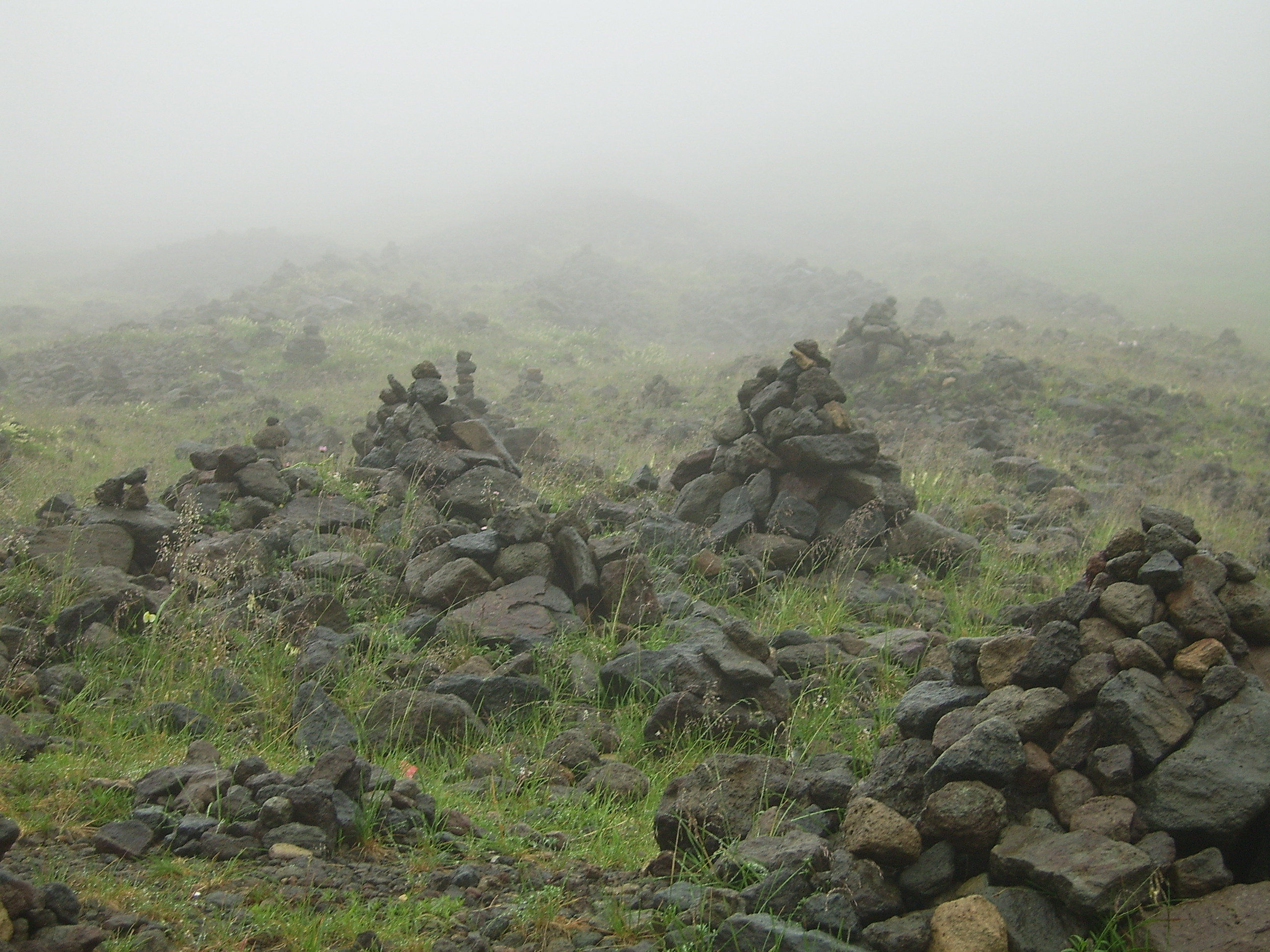
Cairns

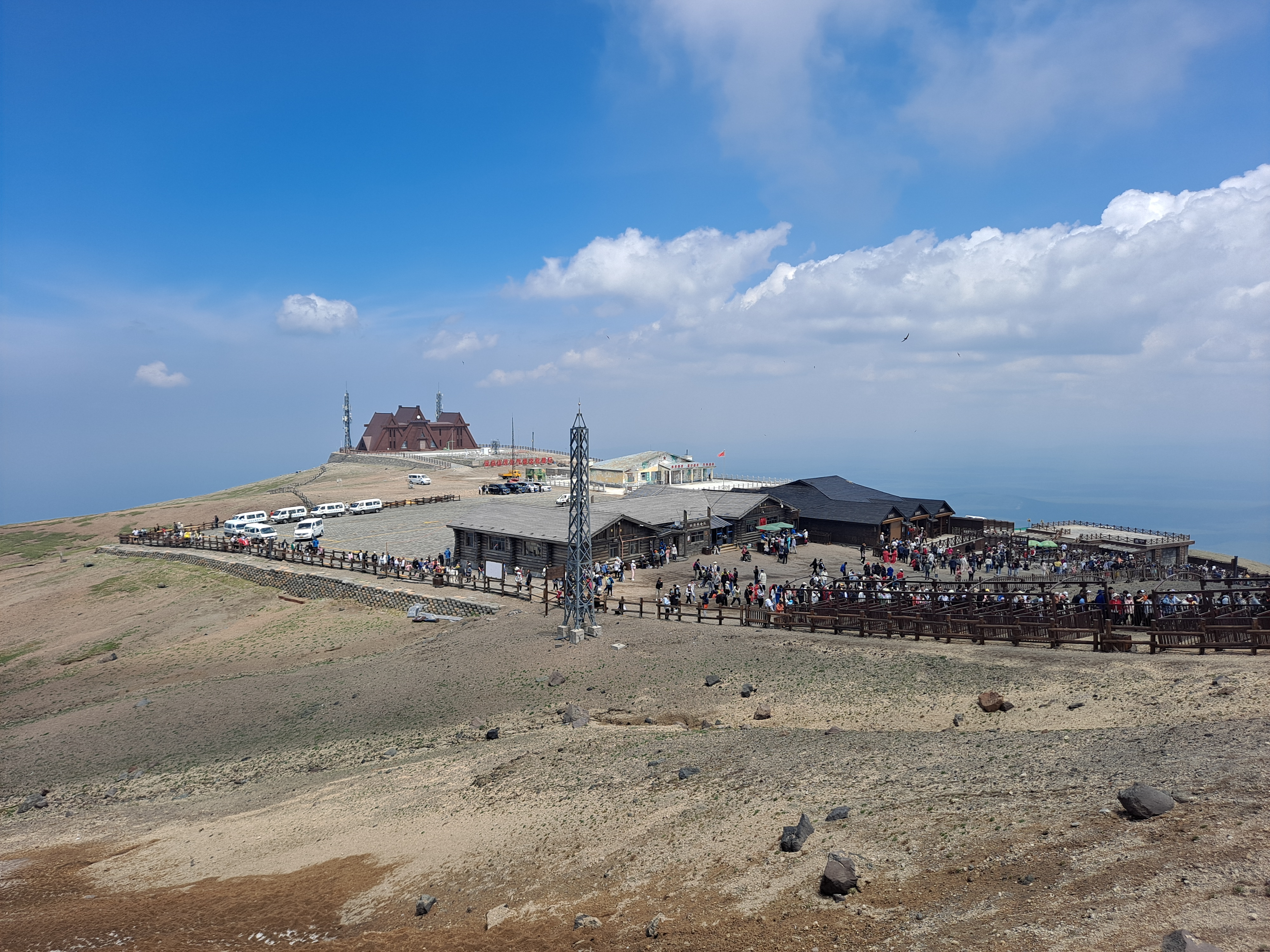
Mount Changbai Visitor Center

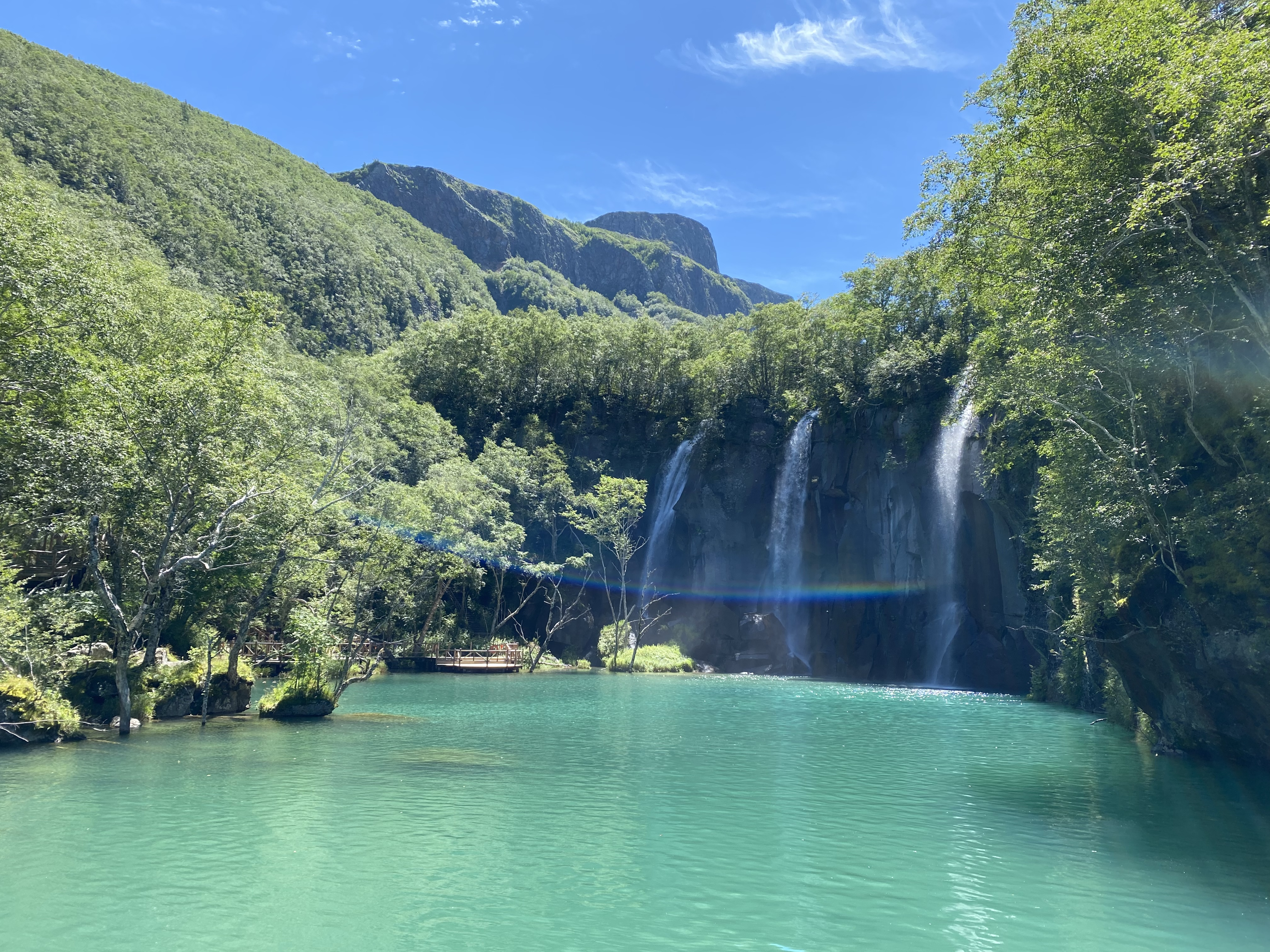
Waterfall of Lüyuantan

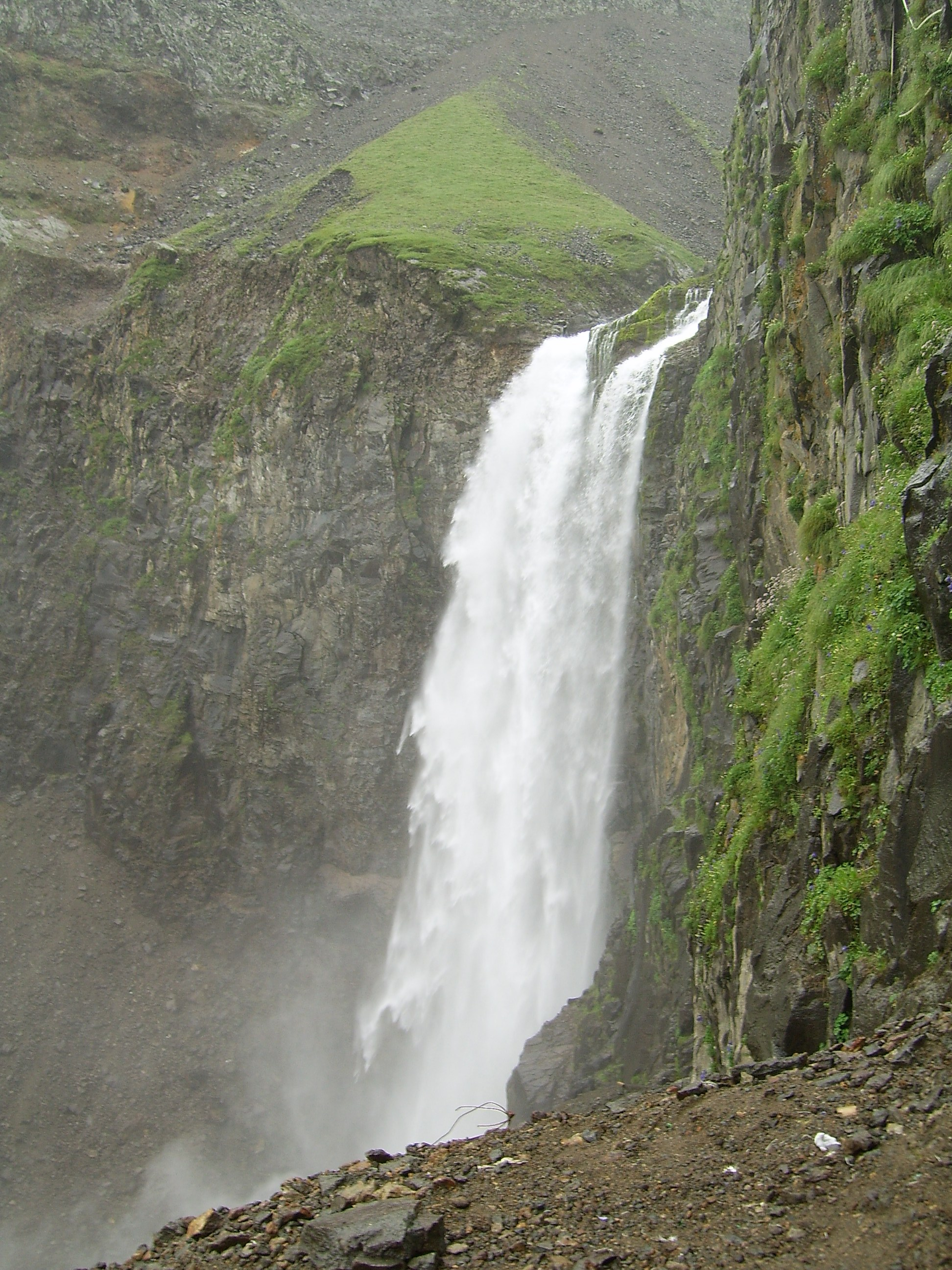
Changbai Waterfall

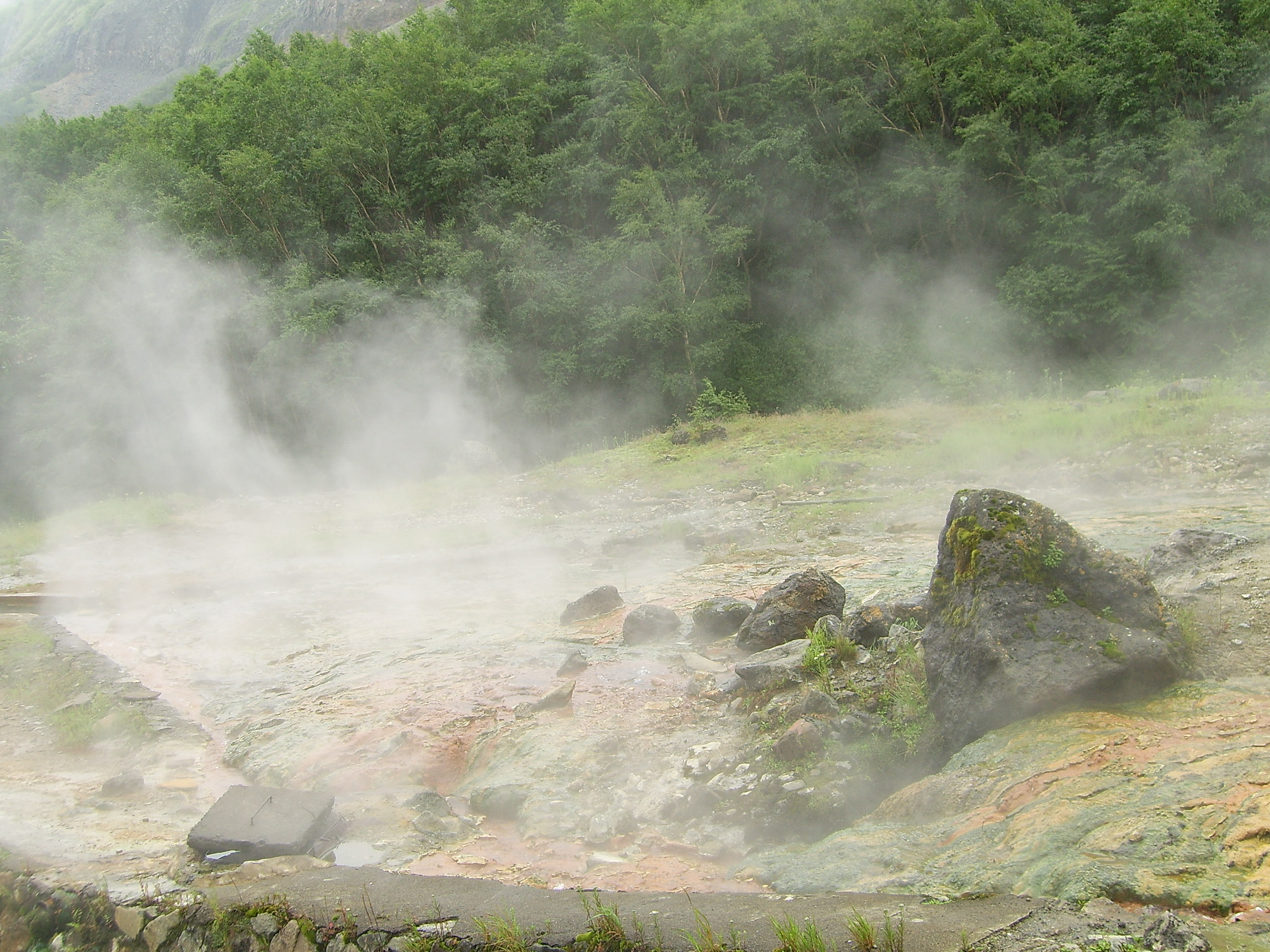
Julong Hot Springs

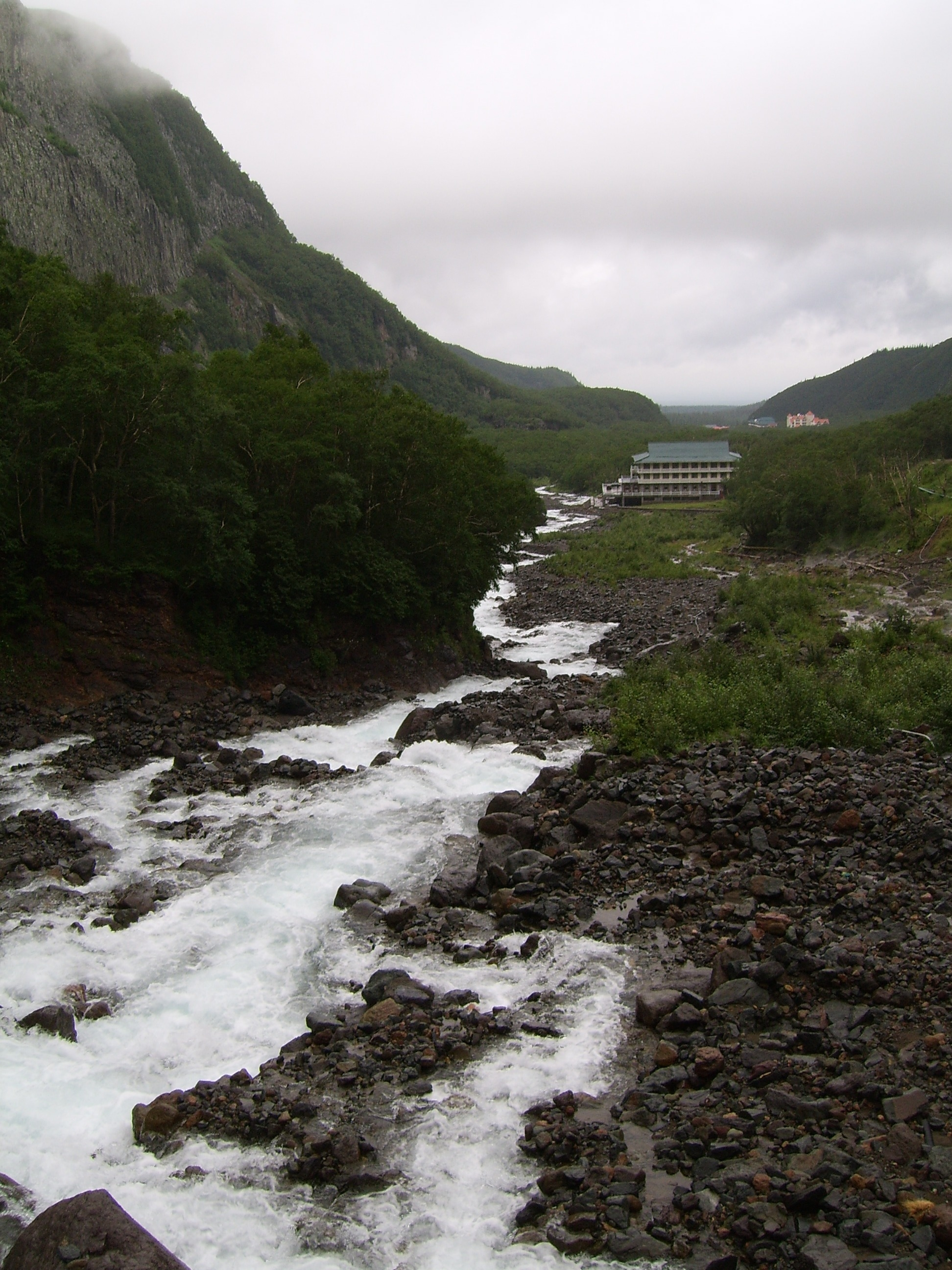
Erdaobai River

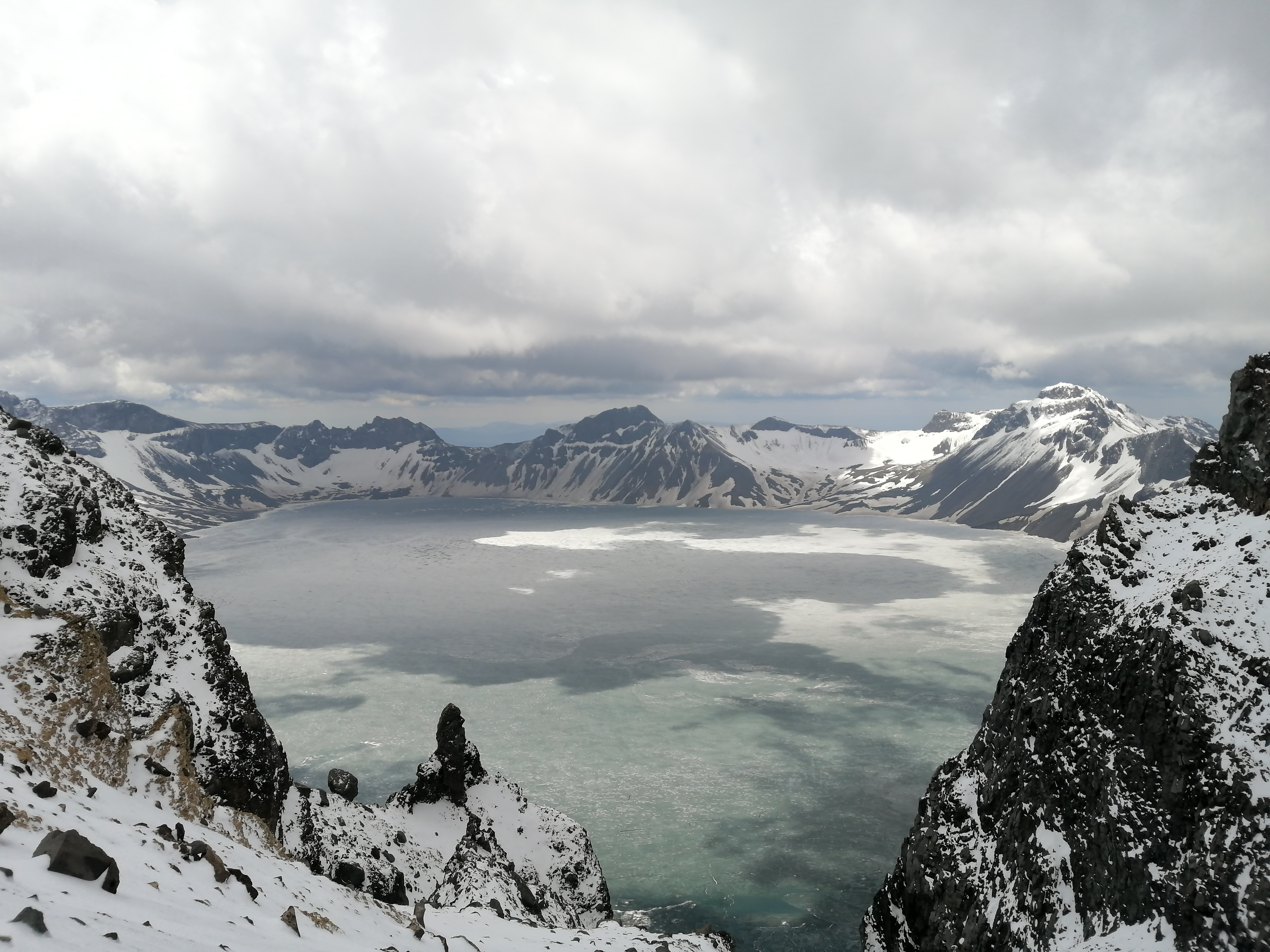
Heaven Lake in early June

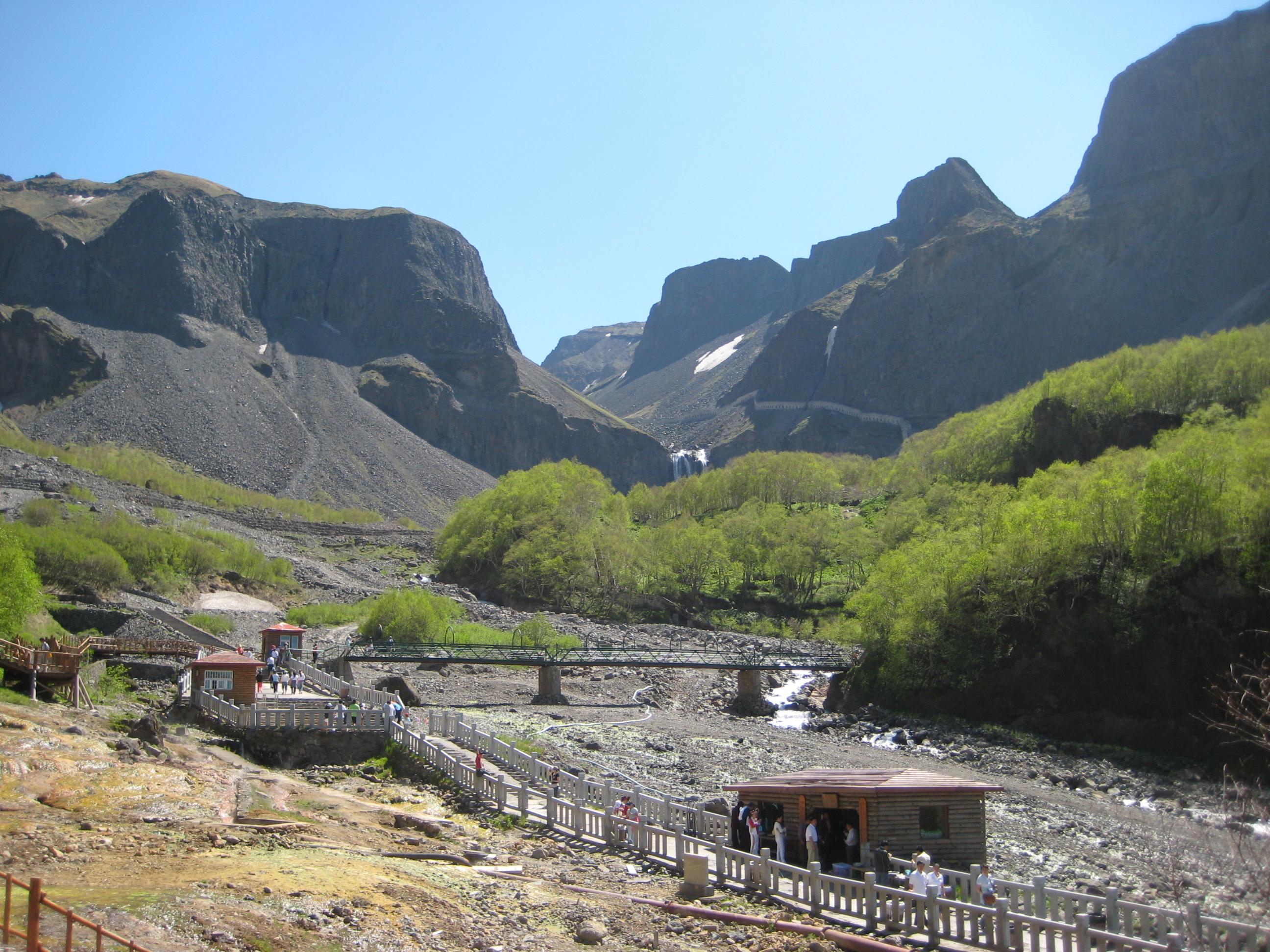
North slope

== See also ==
- Geography of North Korea
- Changbai Mountain Range
- Jong-il Peak
- List of ultras of Northeast Asia
- List of mountains in Korea
- List of volcanoes in Korea
- List of volcanoes in China
- Geography of China
- Mount Paektu bloodline
- Mt. Paektu (poem)
- Sacred mountains
- Five Mountains of Korea
- Hallasan, tallest point in South Korea
