= Paektusan Secret Camp =

Alleged birthplace of Kim Jong Il

- 백두산 밀영 (Korean)
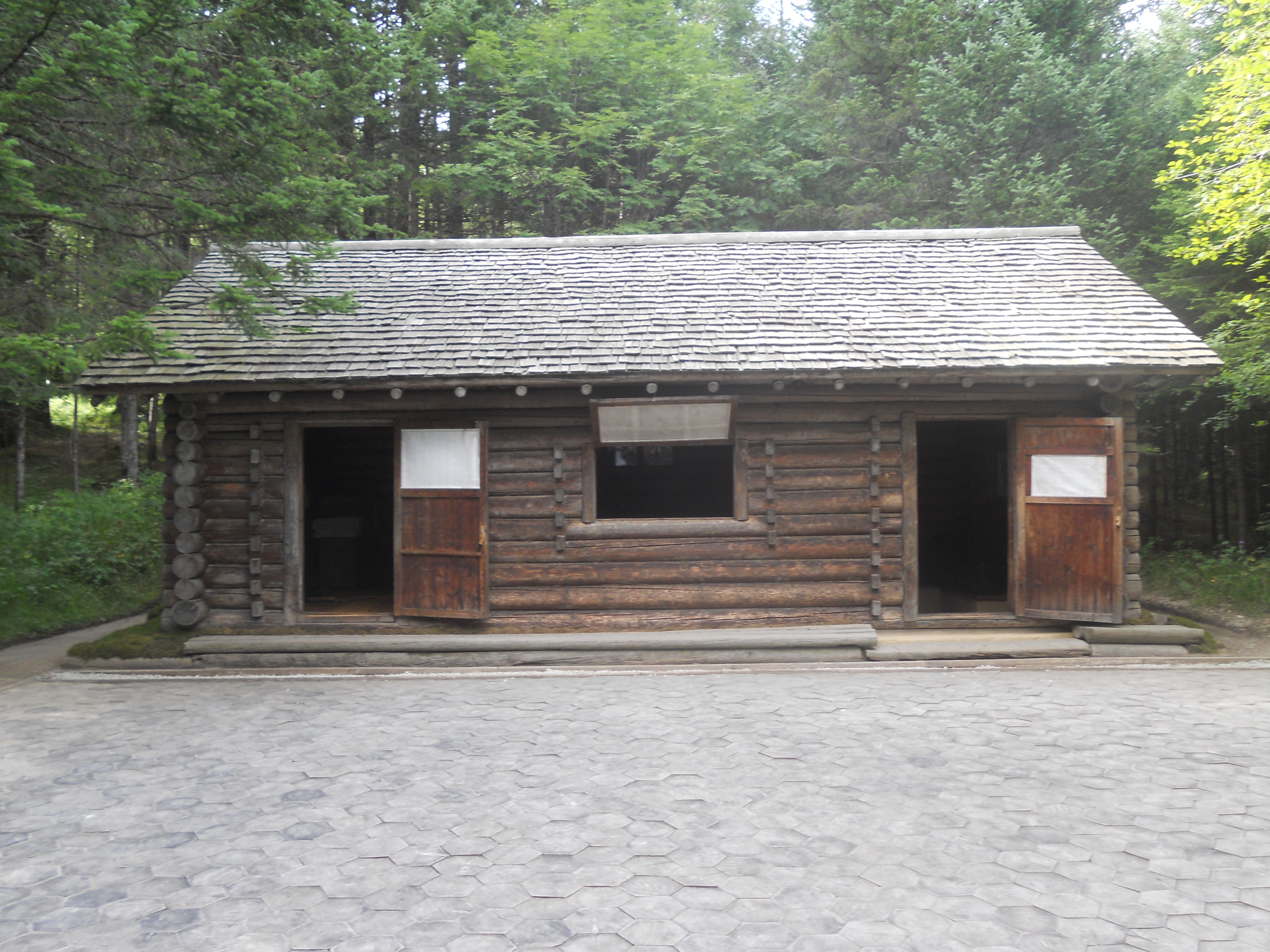
- The log cabin at the camp
- Interactive map of Paektusan Secret Camp
- 41°51′47″N 128°09′35″E
- Location: Mount Paektu

The Paektusan Secret Camp is claimed to be a former military base on Mount Paektu, and the claimed birthplace of Kim Jong-Il, though other sources report he was born in the Soviet Union. The official North Korean histography claims that it played an important role in the resistance against the Japanese occupation of the Korean Peninsula, and was occupied by the Korean People's Revolutionary Army. Official photos and descriptions of the location depict there being a log cabin and several barracks at the site. They also describe a monument with a poem dedicated to Kim Jong-Il and allegedly written by Kim Il-Sung located near the camp. The location is currently used to support both Kim Il-Sung and Kim Jong-Il's cult of personality.

== Korean mythology background ==
The entire mountain has a long history in Korean mythology. Not only is it the supposed birthplace of the Korean people, but also the story of Dangun is extremely connected to the area.

== The Camp throughout North Korean propaganda ==
The importance of the camp's site is one of the reasons it has been used so pervasively in North Korean state propaganda. Not only does the land carry significance, but the idea of Kim Jong-Il being born in the area carries implied connections to the stories of Dangun and related entities. The camp has also been used to support the North Korea's enormous cultural focus on the Korean occupation by Japan. State broadcaster Korean Central Television includes the camp in its weather reports, listing it behind only the capital of Pyongyang.

The camp has also been important to the cult of personality surrounding Kim Jong Suk.
