= Changbai Mountains =

Mountain range in China and North Korea

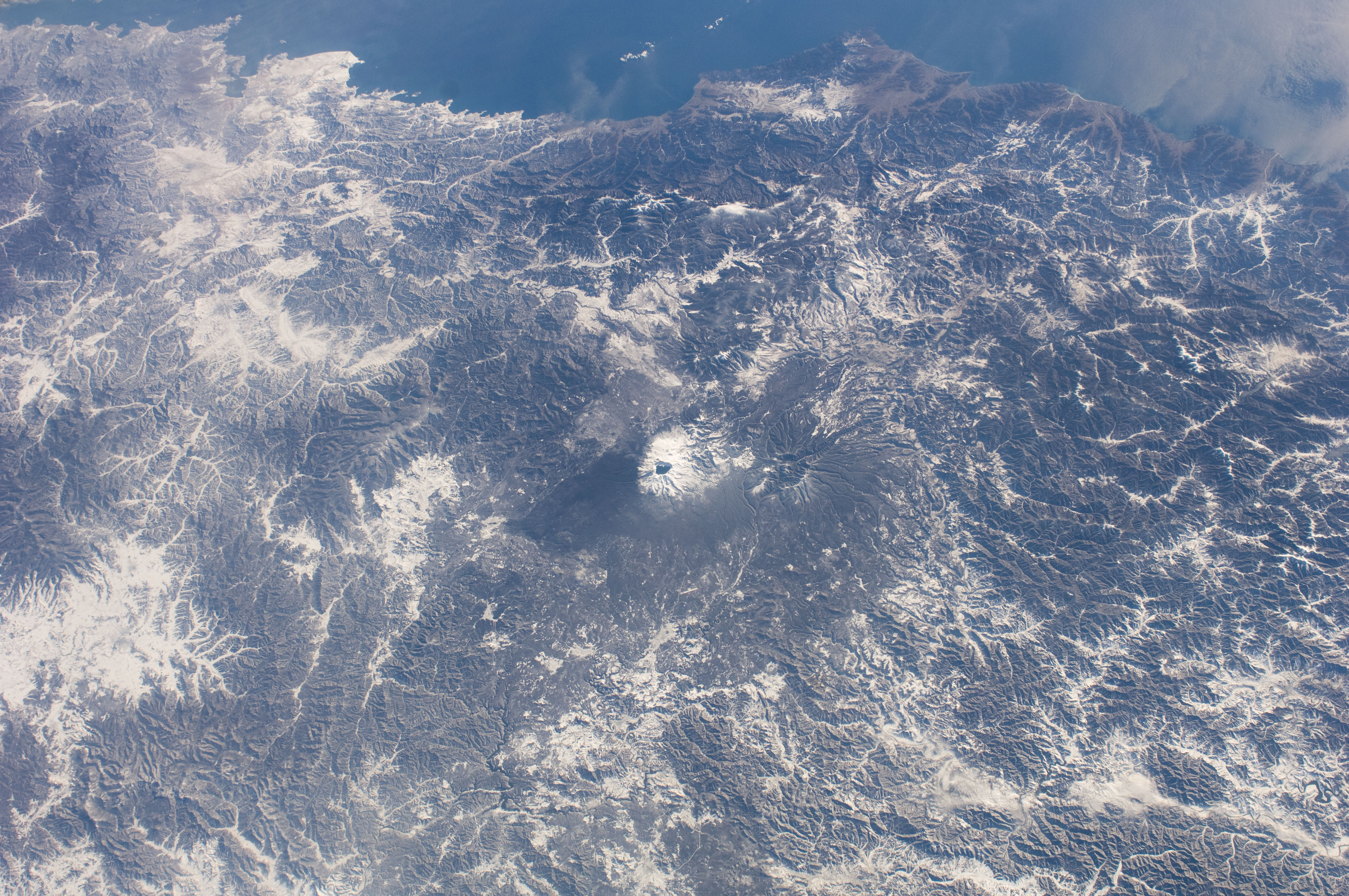
- Aerial View of Changbai Mountains

Highest point
- Peak: Mount Paektu
- Elevation: 2,744 m (9,003 ft)
- Prominence: 2,593 m (8,507 ft)

Geography
- Location within China Location within North Korea
- Countries: China; North Korea
- Range coordinates: 41.991°N 128.005°E

The Changbai Mountains (simplified Chinese: 长白山脉; traditional Chinese: 長白山脈; lit. 'long white mountain range') are a major mountain range in East Asia that extends from the Northeast Chinese provinces of Heilongjiang, Jilin and Liaoning, across the China-North Korea border (41°41' to 42°51'N; 127°43' to 128°16'E), to the North Korean provinces of Ryanggang and Chagang. They are also referred to as the Šanggiyan Mountains in the Manchu language, or the Great Paekdu in Korean. Most of its peaks exceed 2,000 m (6,600 ft) in height, with the tallest summit being Paektu Mountain at 2,744 m (9,003 ft), which contains the Heaven Lake, a large volcanic crater lake at a surface elevation of 2,189.1 m (7,182 ft). The protected area Longwanqun National Forest Park is located within the vicinity of the mountain range.

== History ==
Painting from the Manchu Veritable Records

The mountain was first recorded in the Classic of Mountains and Seas under the name Buxian Shan (不咸山). It is also called Shanshan Daling (單單大嶺) in the Book of the Later Han. In the New Book of Tang, it was called Taibai Shan (太白山). The current Chinese name Changbai Shan was first used in the Liao dynasty (916–1125) of the Khitans and then the Jin dynasty (1115–1234) of the Jurchens.

Changbai Mountains

Chinese name
- Simplified Chinese: 长白山脉
- Traditional Chinese: 長白山脈
- Literal meaning: Perpetually White Mountains
Transcriptions
Standard Mandarin
- Hanyu Pinyin: Chángbái Shānmài
- Wade–Giles: Ch'ang-pai Shan-mai

Korean name
- Chosŏn'gŭl: 장백산맥
- Hancha: 長白山脈
Transcriptions
- Revised Romanization: Jangbaek sanmaek
- McCune–Reischauer: Changbaek sanmaek

Manchu name
- Manchu script: ᡤᠣᠯᠮᡳᠨ ᡧᠠᠩᡤᡳᠶᠠᠨ ᠠᠯᡳᠨ
- Romanization: Golmin šanggiyan alin

The range represents the mythical birthplace of Bukūri Yongšon, ancestor of Nurhaci and the Aisin Gioro imperial family, who were the founders of the Qing dynasty of China. The Chinese name literally means "Perpetually-White Mountain Region". The imperial family regarded the mountain as their traditional homeland.

The Qing emperor Hong Taiji claimed that their progenitor, Bukūri Yongšon (布庫里雍順), was conceived from a virgin birth. According to the legend, three heavenly maidens, namely Enggulen (恩古倫), Jenggulen (正古倫) and Fekulen (佛庫倫), were bathing at a lake called Bulhūri Omo near the Changbai Mountains. A magpie dropped a piece of red fruit near Fekulen, who ate it. She then became pregnant with Bukūri Yongšon. However, another older version of the story by the Hurha (Hurka) tribe member Muksike recorded in 1635 contradicts Hongtaiji's version on location, claiming that it was in Heilongjiang province close to the Amur river where Bulhuri lake was located where the "heavenly maidens" took their bath. Nowadays the famous Yabuli Ski Resort is located in the Changbai Mountains.

== Geography and climate ==
The mountains are the source of the Songhua, Tumen, and Yalu Rivers.

The Changbai Mountains are characterized by long, cold winters. Precipitation is low in winter, but higher in the summer and fall, with annual averages reaching as high as 1,400 millimeters (55 in).

== Flora and fauna ==
The vegetation of the mountain slopes is divided into several different zones. At the top, above 2,000 meters (6,562 ft), tundra predominates. From 1,700–2,000 meters (5,577–6,562 ft), vegetation is dominated by mountain birch and larch. Below this zone, and down to 1,100 meters (3,609 ft), the dominant trees are spruce, fir, and pine. From 600–1,100 meters (1,969–3,609 ft), the landscape is dominated by mixed forest consisting of Amur linden (Tilia amurensis), pine, maple, and elm. Further down, a temperate hardwood forest is found, dominated by second-growth poplar and birch. There are five known species of plants in the lake on the peak, and some 168 have been counted along its shores. The forest on the Chinese side is ancient and almost unaltered by humans. Birch predominates near the tree line, and pine lower down, mixed with other species. There has been extensive deforestation on the lower slopes on the North Korean side of the mountain.

The area is a known habitat for Siberian tigers, Asian black bears, Mongolian wolves, and wild boars. The Ussuri dholes may have been extirpated from the area. Deer in the mountain forests, which cover the mountain up to about 2,000 meters (6,600 ft), are of the Paekdusan roe deer kind. Many wild birds such as black grouse, owls, and woodpecker are known to inhabit the area. The mountain has been identified by BirdLife International as an Important Bird Area (IBA) because it supports a population of scaly-sided mergansers.

== Gallery ==
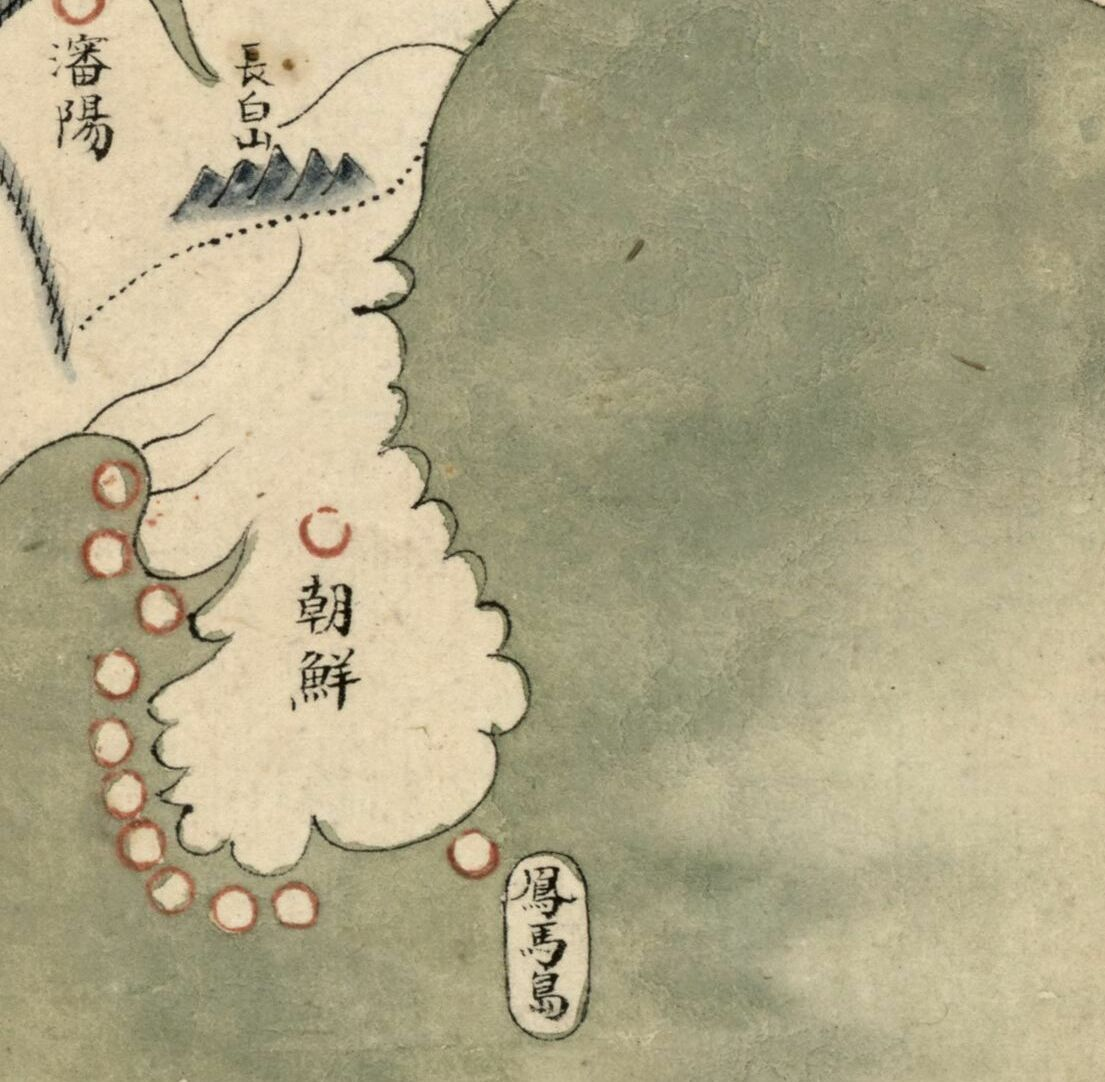
Changbai Mountains in the north end of Korean Peninsula in a Chinese book Provincial Atlas of the Qing Empire (大清分省輿圖, 1754). It was traditionally regarded as the border between China and Korea.

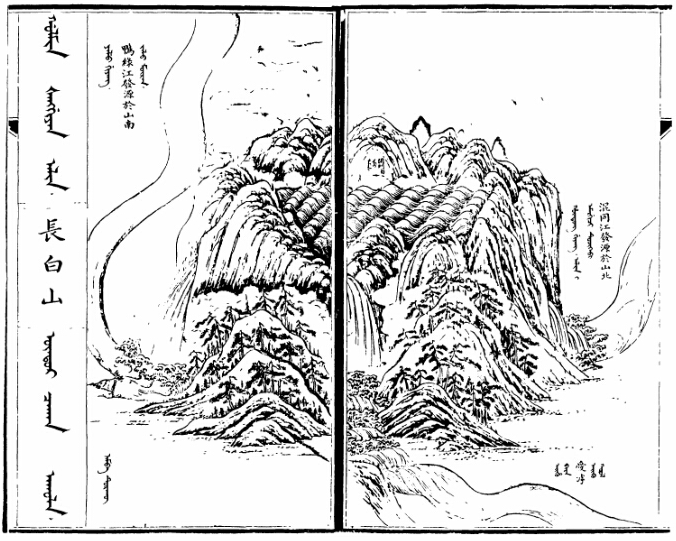
Painting from the Manchu Veritable Records with the names of Mount Paektu in Manchu, Chinese and Mongolian

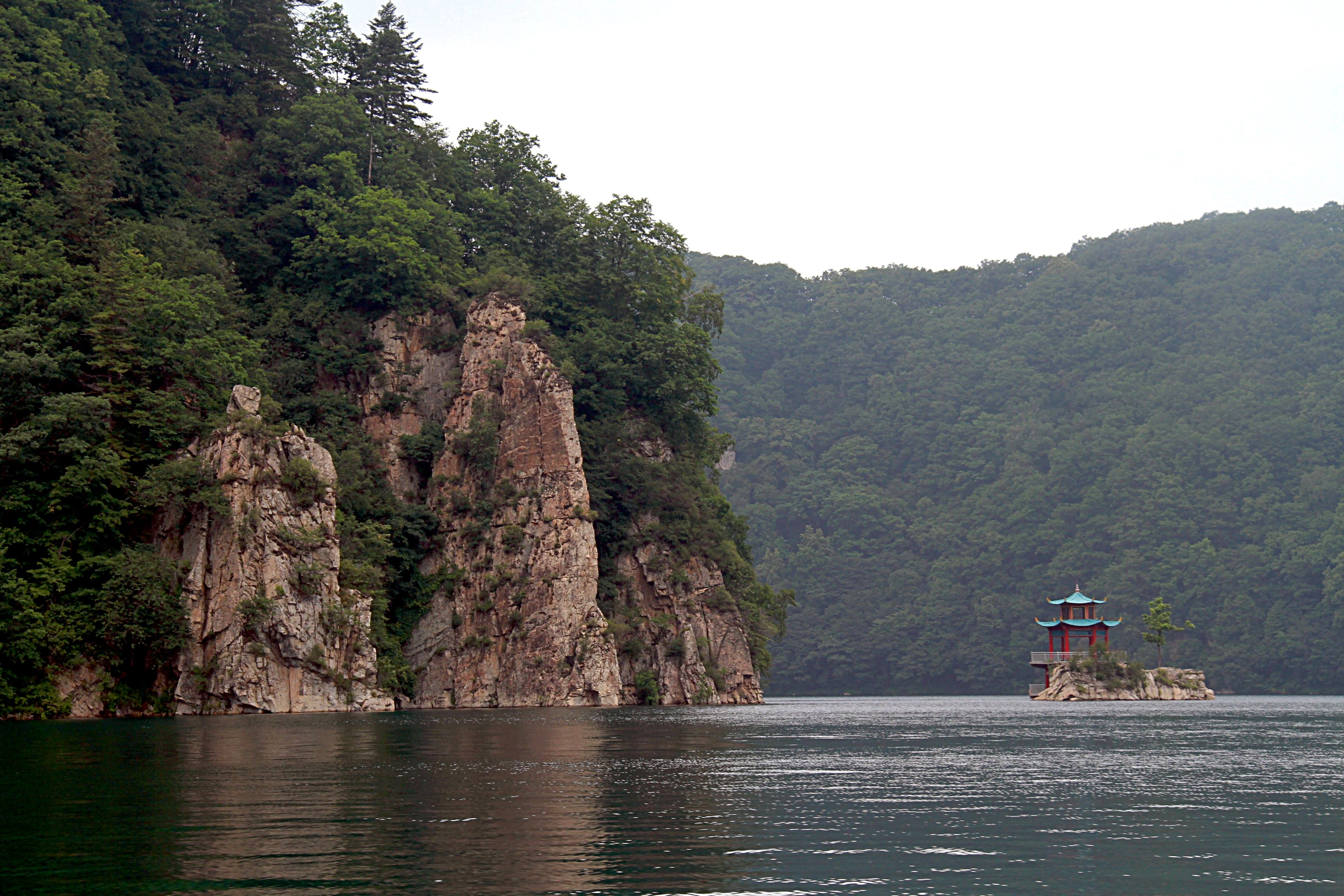
Sanjiaolong Crater Lake in the Longwanqun National Forest Park, Huinan County

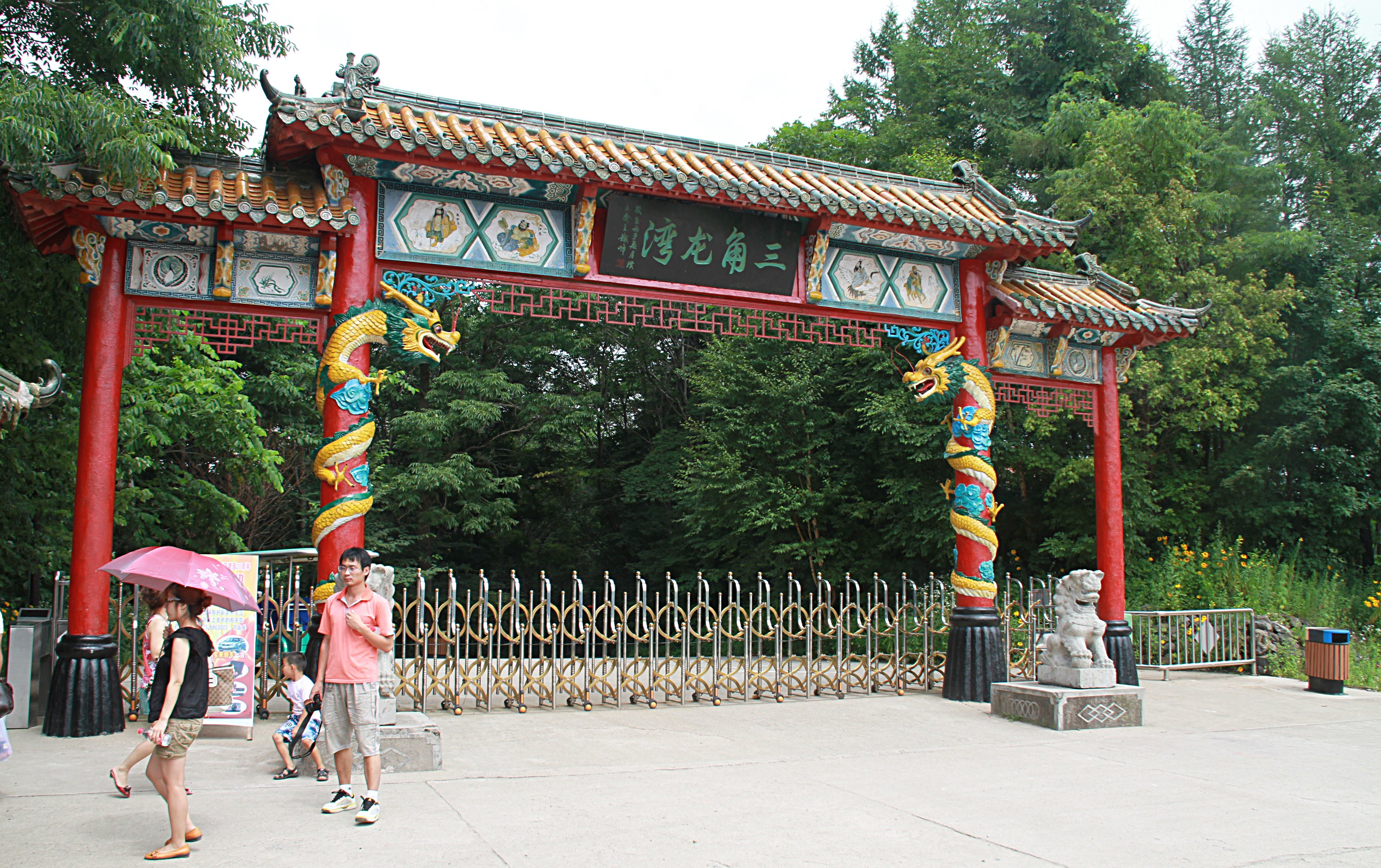
Entrance gate to the forest park

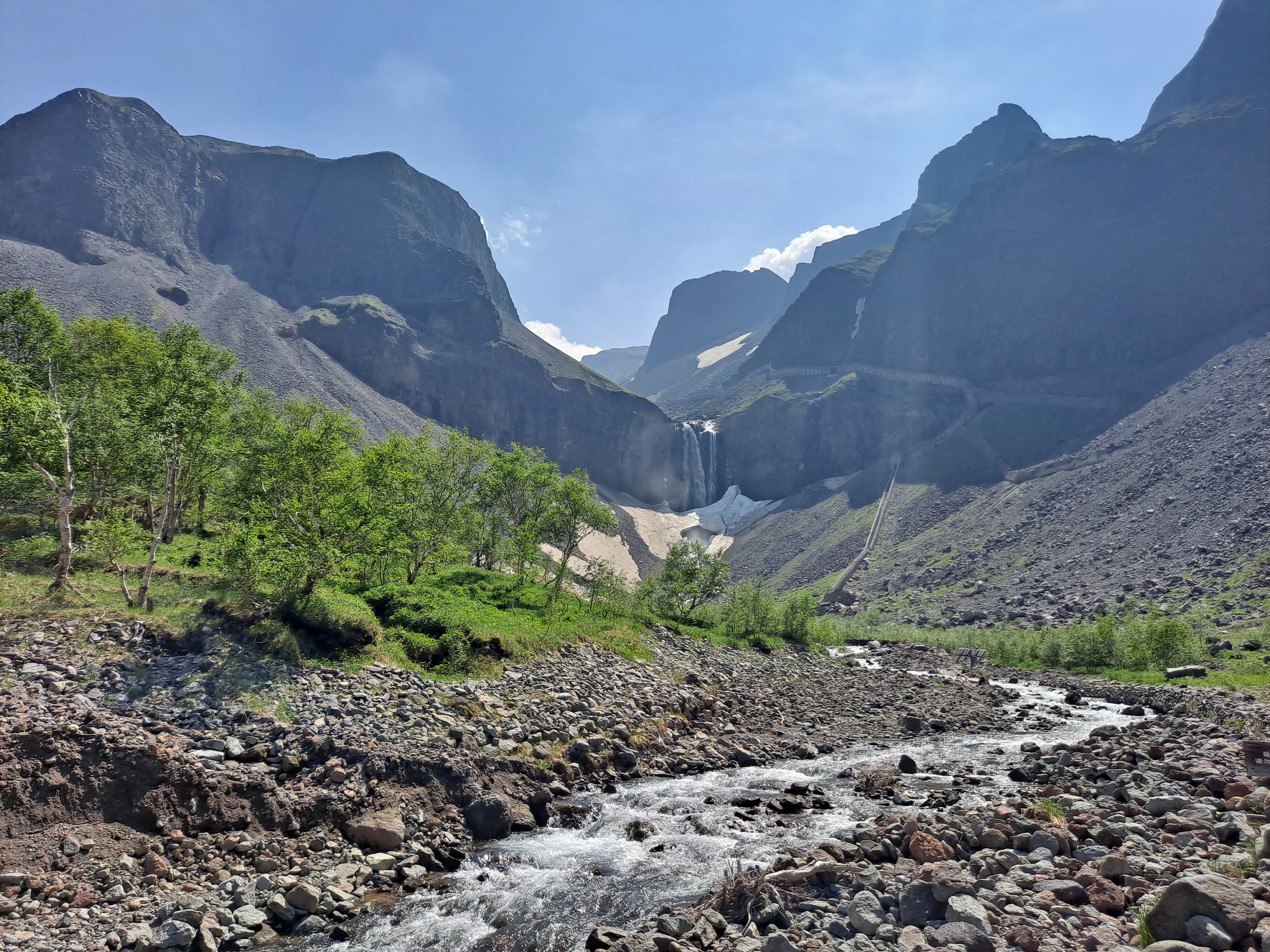
Changbai Waterfall

== See also ==
- Baekdu Mountain
- List of mountains in China
