= Changbai Waterfall =

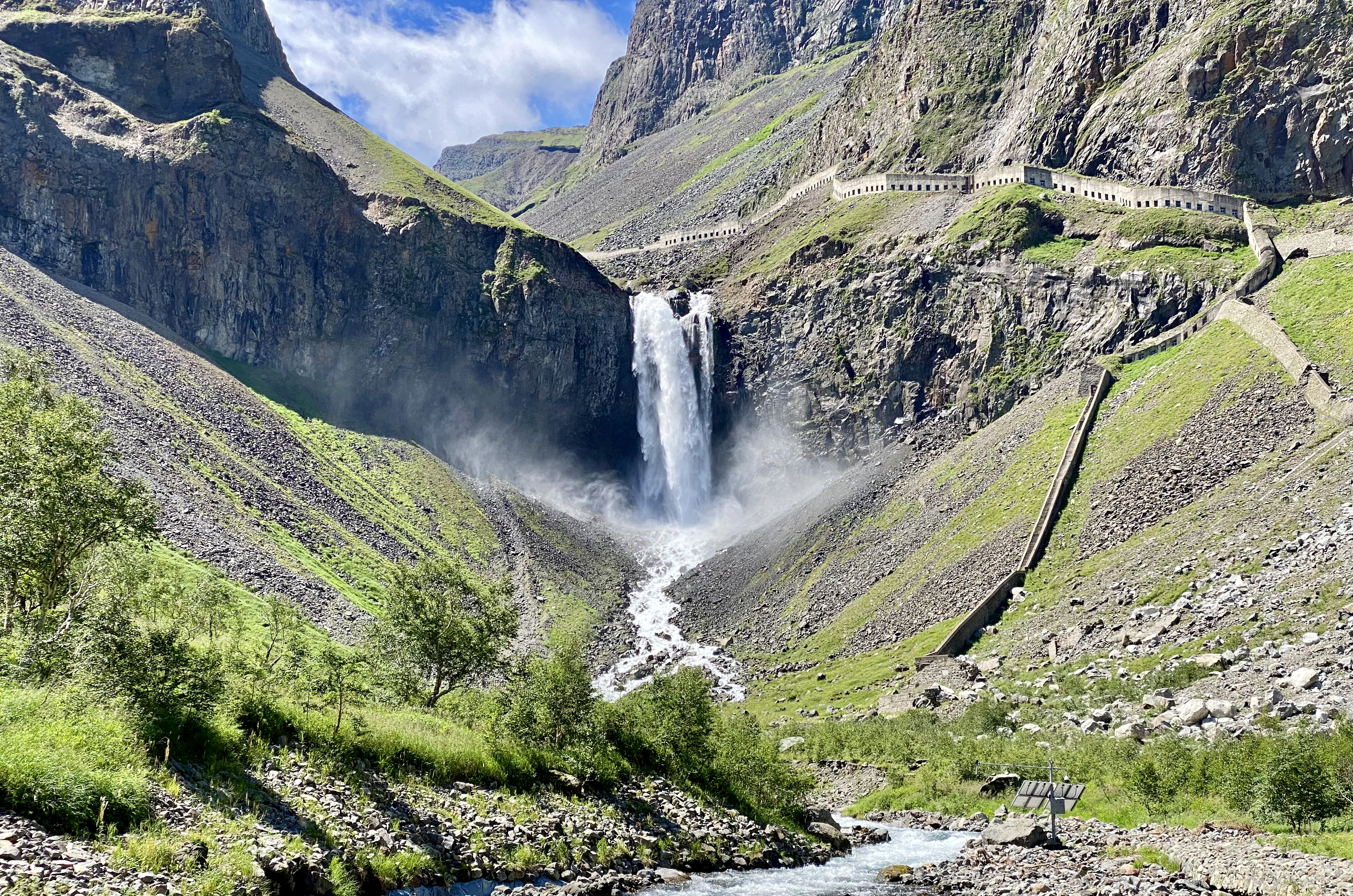
- Changbai Waterfall, seen in from the north slope of the mountain
- Interactive map of Changbai Waterfall
- Location: Yanbian, Jilin, China
- Coordinates: 42°02′07″N 128°03′08″E
- Total height: 68 m (223 ft)
- Number of drops: 2
- Watercourse: Erdaobai River, Songhua River

Changbai Waterfall (Chinese: 长白瀑布; pinyin: Chángbái Pùbù) is a 68 m (223 ft)-tall alpine waterfall in Northeast China, located to the north slope of the Changbai Mountain, the tallest summit of the Changbai Mountain Range between China and North Korea.

== Geography ==
With a drop of 68 m (223 ft), the Changbai Waterfall is in the Guinness World Records as the largest waterfall originating from a volcanic crater lake. It is most dramatic during the summer snow-melt season from the Heaven Lake (Chinese: 天池; pinyin: Tiānchí) basin. Tianchi lake is usually frozen over until late June or July. Flow over the waterfall is reduced in winter months but it never completely freezes over since the lake drains from depth below the ice and the water is geothermally heated beneath year-round. The current China–North Korea border passes nearby, through the center of the alpine Lake Tianchi.

Julong Hot Springs below the falls create pools full of colorful algae that thrive in the geothermal water upwelling. This contributes headwater flow to the young Songhua river. The Songhua flows northward into the Amur, forming China's border with Russia, and eventually into the Sea of Okhotsk facing Sakhalin Island and the northern Pacific.

== Culture ==
=== Folk religion ===
Koreans and Jilin residents traditionally consider the waters of the lake to be sacred. Many Korean-speaking natives bring a bottle to capture some sacred water.

=== Tourism ===
Access to the waterfall is available year-round via a sheltered VIP path up the mountain (visible in photos to the right of the falls). The path is fully enclosed but has windows spaced along the steps. The enclosure protects the path from blockage by snowfall and ice, and is closed during summer.

== See also ==
- List of waterfalls
