= Huinan County =

Huinan County 辉南县
- County
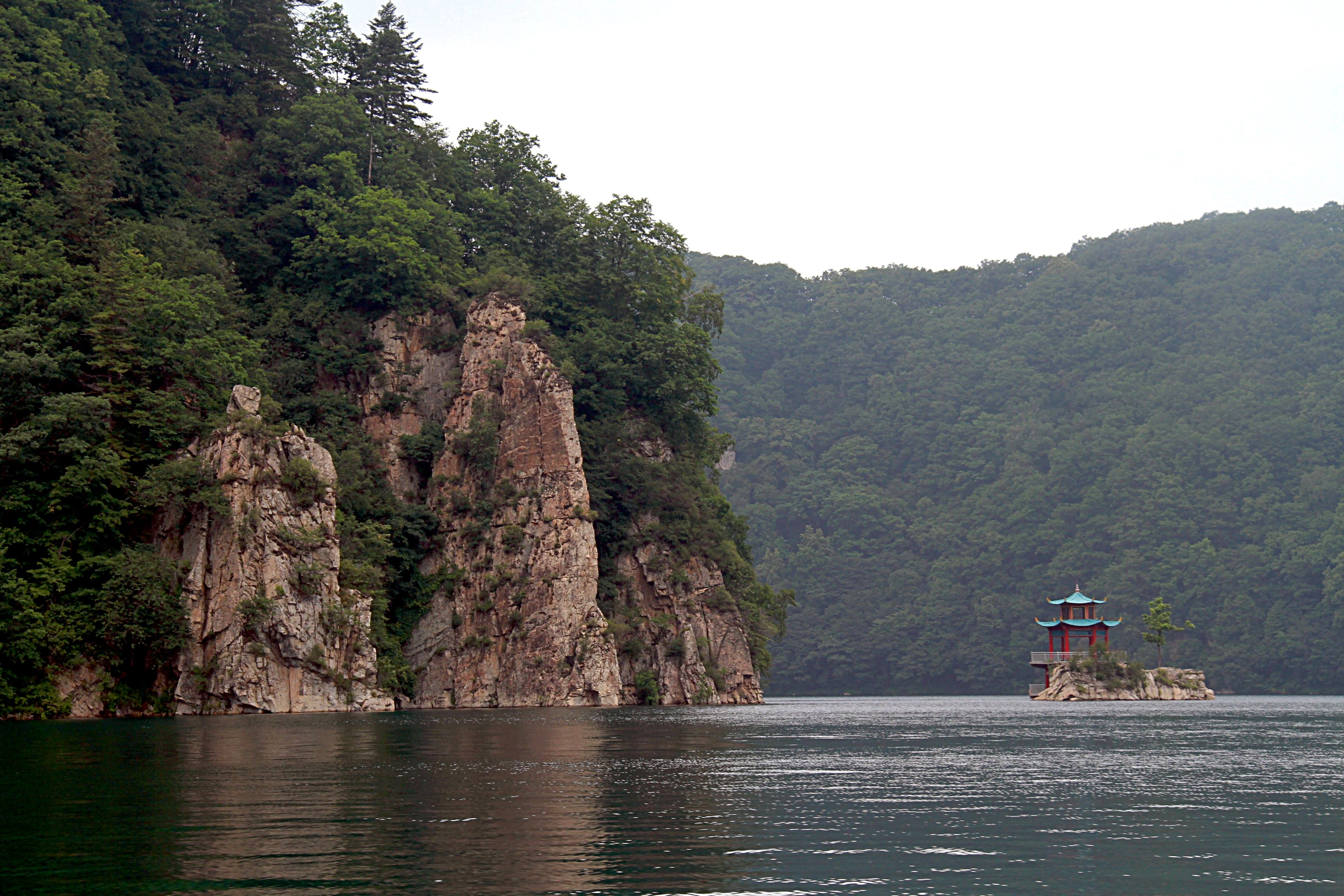

- Location of Huinan County (red) in Tonghua (yellow)

- Location in Jilin
- Coordinates: 42°41′N 126°03′E
- Country: People's Republic of China
- Province: Jilin
- Prefecture-level city: Tonghua
- County seat: Chaoyang (朝阳镇)

Area
  - Total: 2,277 km^{2} (879 sq mi)
- Elevation: 316 m (1,037 ft)

Population
  - Total: 350,000
  - Density: 150/km^{2} (400/sq mi)
- Time zone: UTC+8 (China Standard)
- Postal code: 135100

Huinan County (simplified Chinese: 辉南县; traditional Chinese: 輝南縣; pinyin: Huīnán Xiàn) is a county of Jilin province, China. It is under the administration of Tonghua City, with a population of 350,000 residing in an area of 2,277 km^{2} (879 sq mi).

== Administrative divisions ==
There are 10 towns and one ethnic township.

Towns:

- Chaoyang (朝阳镇), Yangzishao (样子哨镇), Shansonggang (杉松岗镇), Jinchuan (金川镇), Shidaohe (石道河镇), Huifacheng (辉发城镇), Huinan (辉南镇), Qingyang (庆阳镇), Fumin (抚民镇), Tuanlin (团林镇)

The only township is Loujie Korean Ethnic Township (楼街朝鲜族乡)

== Climate ==
Climate data for Huinan, elevation 307 m (1,007 ft), (1991–2020 normals, extremes 1981–2010)
Month	Jan	Feb	Mar	Apr	May	Jun	Jul	Aug	Sep	Oct	Nov	Dec	Year
Record high °C (°F)	5.7 (42.3)	12.4 (54.3)	18.3 (64.9)	29.8 (85.6)	32.9 (91.2)	35.0 (95.0)	35.9 (96.6)	33.8 (92.8)	30.1 (86.2)	26.1 (79.0)	19.6 (67.3)	9.6 (49.3)	35.9 (96.6)
Mean daily maximum °C (°F)	−8.5 (16.7)	−3.2 (26.2)	4.5 (40.1)	14.5 (58.1)	21.7 (71.1)	25.8 (78.4)	27.8 (82.0)	26.8 (80.2)	22.2 (72.0)	14.2 (57.6)	2.9 (37.2)	−6.1 (21.0)	11.9 (53.4)
Daily mean °C (°F)	−17.0 (1.4)	−11.2 (11.8)	−1.7 (28.9)	7.6 (45.7)	15.1 (59.2)	20.3 (68.5)	23.0 (73.4)	21.4 (70.5)	14.9 (58.8)	6.9 (44.4)	−3.2 (26.2)	−13.2 (8.2)	5.2 (41.4)
Mean daily minimum °C (°F)	−24.1 (−11.4)	−18.8 (−1.8)	−7.6 (18.3)	1.0 (33.8)	8.7 (47.7)	15.3 (59.5)	18.8 (65.8)	17.1 (62.8)	9.0 (48.2)	0.7 (33.3)	−8.5 (16.7)	−19.7 (−3.5)	−0.7 (30.8)
Record low °C (°F)	−43.3 (−45.9)	−39.8 (−39.6)	−30.1 (−22.2)	−11.6 (11.1)	−3.4 (25.9)	5.5 (41.9)	10.8 (51.4)	4.6 (40.3)	−2.9 (26.8)	−11.1 (12.0)	−30.2 (−22.4)	−36.9 (−34.4)	−43.3 (−45.9)
Average precipitation mm (inches)	6.4 (0.25)	8.4 (0.33)	17.3 (0.68)	35.4 (1.39)	68.1 (2.68)	106.7 (4.20)	177.1 (6.97)	158.9 (6.26)	58.6 (2.31)	38.7 (1.52)	23.9 (0.94)	11.4 (0.45)	710.9 (27.98)
Average precipitation days (≥ 0.1 mm)	6.7	5.4	6.9	8.4	13.0	14.6	14.6	14.4	9.3	8.7	7.7	7.4	117.1
Average snowy days	9.5	7.5	8.3	3.1	0.1	0	0	0	0	1.9	7.5	10.0	47.9
Average relative humidity (%)	72	68	63	58	62	73	82	84	79	71	72	73	71
Mean monthly sunshine hours	162.1	181.8	213.4	211.2	237.8	227.8	211.4	210.6	217.6	193.7	155.9	148.1	2,371.4
Percentage possible sunshine	55	61	57	52	52	50	46	49	59	57	54	53	54
Source: China Meteorological Administration
