= Korean People's Revolutionary Army =

Purported Korean guerrilla group

- 조선인민혁명군
- Active: 25 April 1932 – 7 February 1948
- Allegiance: Korea
- Type: Partisan
- Role: Infantry
- Engagements: World War II; Soviet–Japanese War; Soviet occupation of northern Korea

Commanders
- Notable commanders: Kim Il Sung

The Korean People's Revolutionary Army (Korean: 조선인민혁명군; KPRA) was a purported partisan group which North Korea claims fought against the Japanese rule in Korea. North Korean historiography claims that the KPRA was founded on 25 April 1932 by Kim Il Sung.

== Description ==
There is no mention of the Korean People's Revolutionary Army in documents written by Kim Il Sung himself during his time in the Soviet Army. Coined in the wake of the May 25th Instructions, the purported army is connected to Kim Il Sung's cult of personality initiated by the guerrilla faction from the Soviet Army's 88th Separate Rifle Brigade, which seized power in North Korea. The KPRA was first mentioned in the late 1940s.

Korean People's Revolutionary Army was allegedly founded on 25 April 1932. North Korean historiography credits the defeat of Japan in 1945 mostly to the KPRA, downplaying Soviet involvement. From 1978, North Korea marked 25 April as the "true" founding date of the Korean People's Army (KPA), with the KPA being claimed to just be the reconstitution of the KPRA. North Korean leader Kim Jong Un moved back the KPA's official founding date back to its original date of 8 February 1948, with 25 April instead becoming the official foundation date of the KPRA

== See also ==
- List of militant Korean independence activist organizations
