= Onwards Toward the Final Victory =

North Korean propaganda hymn

Song
- Songwriter: Kim Mun Hyok
- Composer: Yun Du Gun

- Onwards Toward the Final Victory
- Hangul: 최후의 승리를 향하여 앞으로
- RR: Choehuui seungnireul hyanghayeo apeuro
- MR: Ch'oehuŭi sŭngnirŭl hyanghayŏ ap'ŭro

"Onwards Toward the Final Victory" (Korean: 최후의 승리를 향하여 앞으로) is a North Korean propaganda hymn dedicated to the country's leader Kim Jong Un. It continues the tradition of North Korean supreme leaders having hymns dedicated to them, as was the case with Kim's grandfather Kim Il Sung ("Song of General Kim Il-sung") and Kim's father Kim Jong Il ("Song of General Kim Jong-il", "No Motherland Without You").

The hymn has been airing repeatedly in North Korean state media since July 2012. Its music is attributed to Yu Du Gun, and its lyrics to Kim Mun Hyok.

== Text ==
The text consists of three short stanzas that emphasize the political unity ("By exploding the mental strength of the united heart of our million citizens"), military prowess ("As our undefeated army boasts winning a hundred battles") and economic strength of North Korea ("By raising the beacon of the new industrial revolution of the new century"). Each stanza ends by rallying the "great Baekdu Mountain Nation (...) onward to the final victory". According to John Delury of Yonsei University the final victory refers to Korean reunification.

The text is taken from a speech by Kim Jong Un given on the occasion of the 100th anniversary of the birth of his grandfather and of the country's founding leader Kim Il Sung. As such, and unusually for hymns dedicated to North Korean leaders, Kim Jong Un's own name is not mentioned. The message of North Korea as a "powerful, prosperous nation" is emphasized, although unlike in earlier propaganda material the DPRK is no longer referred to as a taeguk ("great country", "great power"), but as a gukga ("country").

== Video ==
On North Korean state television, the hymn is aired accompanied by a video montage of 2 minutes 41 seconds in length. It combines scenes of North Korean mountains with footage of marching soldiers and citizens, military hardware (nuclear missiles on parade, ships and aircraft, artillery rockets and torpedoes being fired) and industrial machinery, occasionally overlaid with hand-drawn propaganda artwork in the traditional Socialist Realist style.

== Reception ==
The Guardian's music critic Alexis Petridis favorably noted the "sheer ferocity" with which the military choir belts out the hymn, although he commented that the relentless martial beat becomes pretty wearying after a few minutes. Still, according to Petridis, "Onwards Toward the Final Victory" is at least not "boring as hell", unlike the country's other output of contemporary music by groups such as Pochonbo Electronic Ensemble, whose songs he compared to typical 1970s Eurovision Song Contest entries.

In North Korea itself, the song has been "enthusiastically received by the citizens", according to the North Korean state newspaper Rodong Sinmun. The government-run Korean Central News Agency reported that "the song hardens the will of the Korean army and people to devote their all to the prosperity of the country with high national pride".

== See also ==
- Music of North Korea
