= No Motherland Without You =

North Korean patriotic song

- Hangul: 당신이 없으면 조국도 없다
- Hanja: 當身이 없으면 祖國도 없다
- RR: Dangsini eopseumyeon jogukdo eopda
- MR: Tangsini ŏpsŭmyŏn chogukto ŏpta

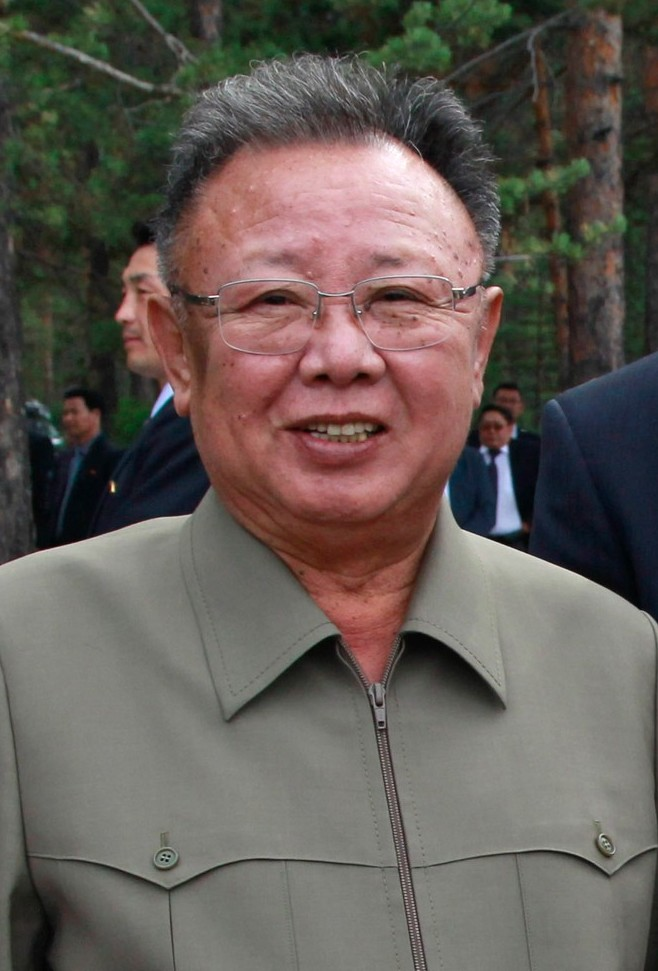
Kim Jong-il

"No Motherland Without You" (or "Ode to Kim Jong Il") is a North Korean song about the country's second supreme leader, Kim Jong Il. Composed by Hwang Jin Yong and written by Ri Jong O, it extols the proclaimed talent and virtues of Kim, and the North Korean people's loyalty to him.

== Significance ==
"No Motherland Without You" was composed especially for Kim Jong Il and is considered his "signature song". The song enjoys popularity in North Korea, where it is frequently broadcast on the radio and from loudspeakers on the streets of Pyongyang. Whereas the "Song of General Kim Il Sung" was sung at the beginning of public gatherings, "No Motherland Without You" was often sung at the end. Since at least 1994, before the creation of the "Song of General Kim Jong Il", the song was played by the North Korean state television at the start of broadcasts each day.

== Lyrics ==
The civil lyrics use the phrase 김정일동지 (Comrade Kim Jong-il) to refer to the son of Kim Il-sung. The military version of the song refers to the North Korean leader as 김정일장군 (General Kim Jong-il), as he was the Supreme Commander of the Korean People's Army since 1991.

== See also ==
- North Korean music
- Propaganda in North Korea
- Pochonbo Electronic Ensemble
