= Propaganda in North Korea =

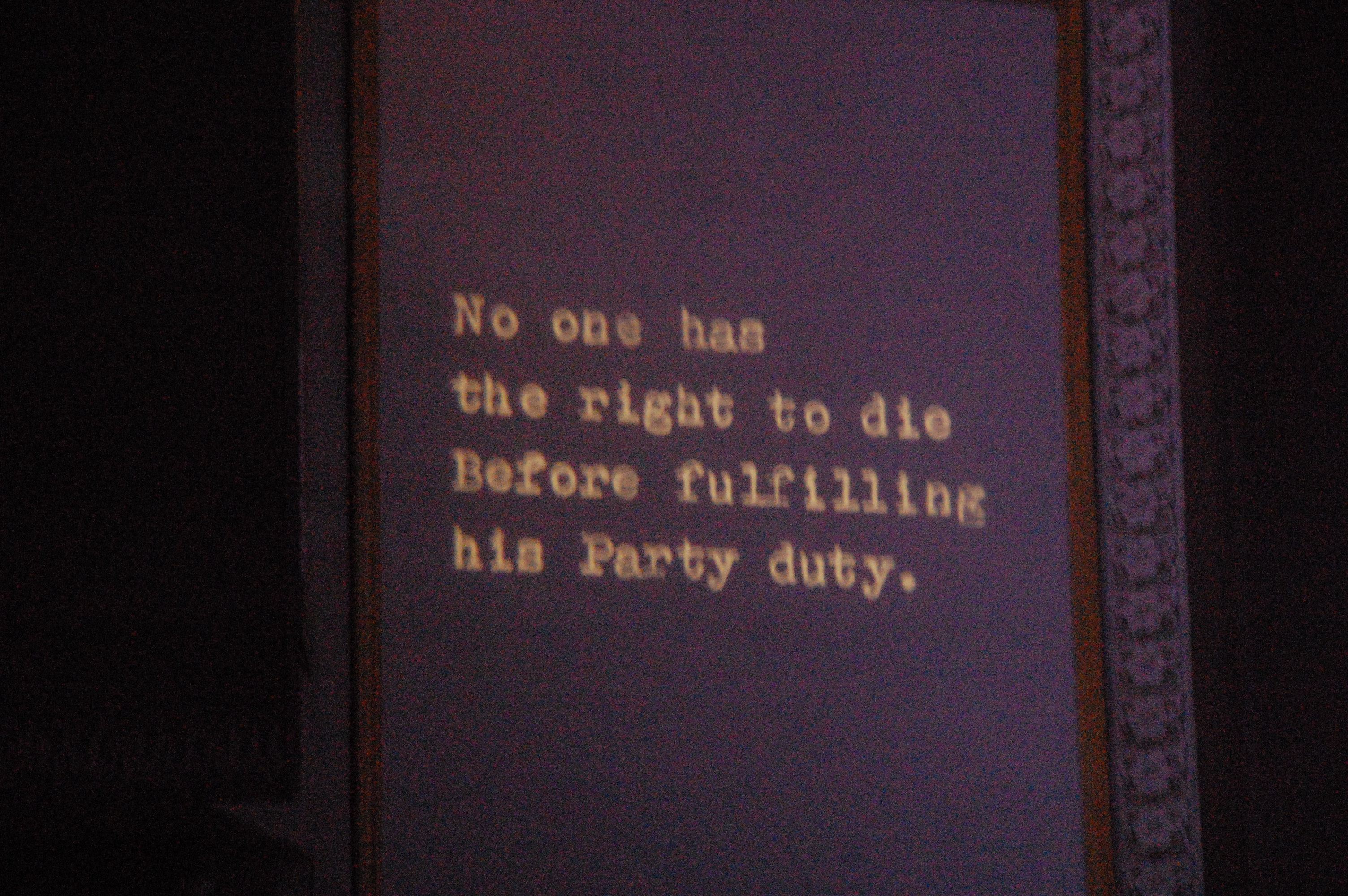
Surtitles at a Korean revolutionary opera

Propaganda is widely used and produced by the government of the Democratic People's Republic of Korea (North Korea). Most propaganda is based on the Juche ideology, veneration of the ruling Kim family, the promotion of the Workers' Party of Korea, and hostilities against both the Republic of Korea and the United States.

The first syllable of Juche, "ju", means the man; the second syllable, "che", means body of oneself. Article 3 of the Socialist Constitution proclaims, "The DPRK is guided in its activities by the Juche idea, a world outlook centered on people, a revolutionary ideology for achieving the independence of the masses of people."

Many pictures of the supreme leaders are posted throughout the country.

== Early history and integration into society ==
Since the division of Korea in 1945, propaganda has delivered its messages in primarily visual forms, such as posters. This stemmed from high illiteracy rates among adults and low primary school attendance rates among children. Posters in particular are a relatively cheap way to spread the government's messages to the people in an eye-catching way. Posters can be seen in many areas on a daily basis, so that the messages can either be directly or subconsciously absorbed by the people.

== Themes ==
=== Cult of personality ===
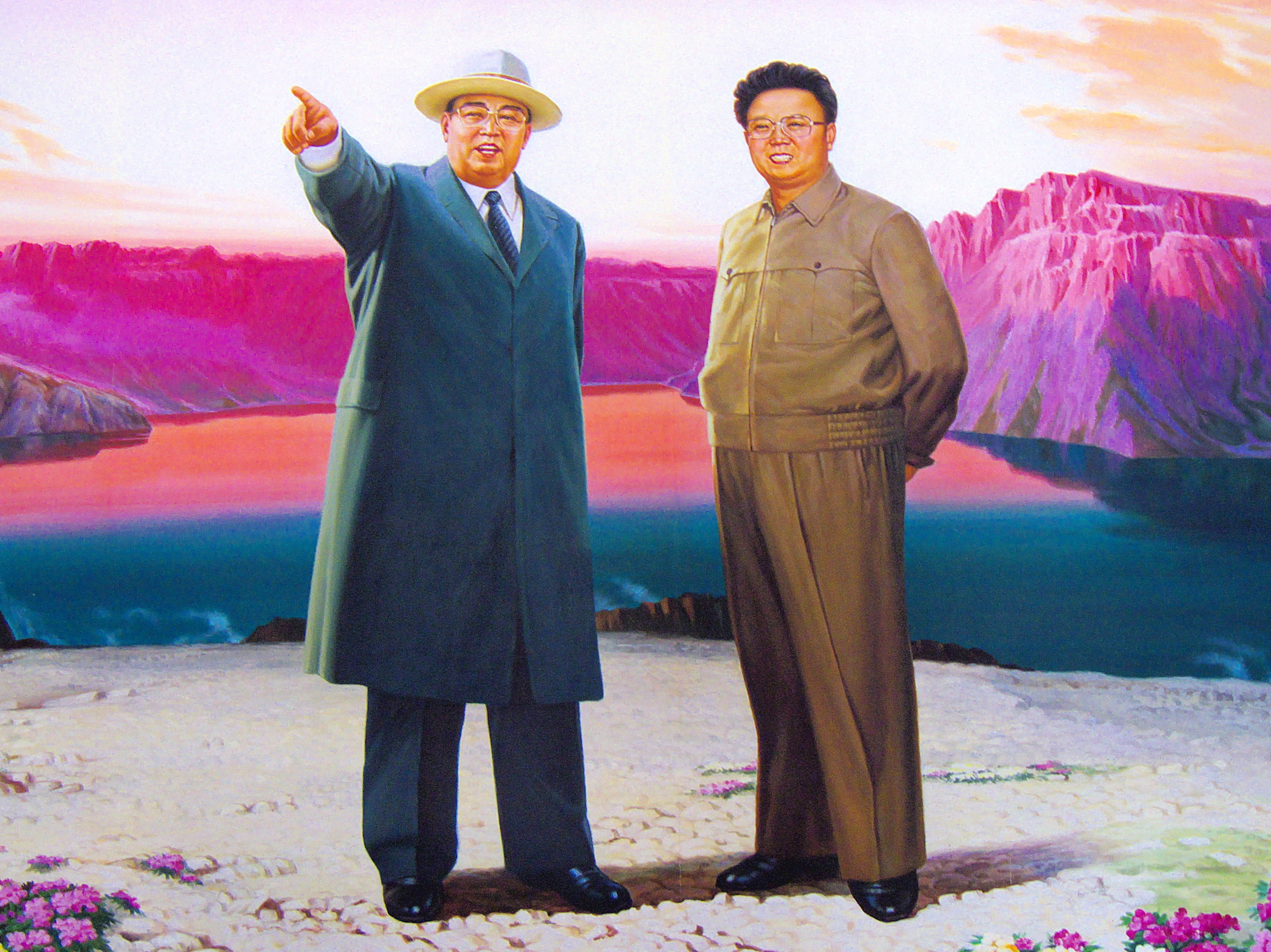
Kim Il Sung with Kim Jong Il on Mount Paektu

North Korean propaganda was crucial to the formation and promotion of the cult of personality centered around the founder of the DPRK, Kim Il Sung. The Soviet Union used propaganda to develop a cult of personality around Kim, particularly as a Korean resistance fighter, as soon as they put him in power. This quickly surpassed its Eastern European models. Instead of depicting his actual residence in a Soviet village during the war with the Japanese, he was claimed to have fought a guerrilla war from the Paektusan Secret Camp.

Once relations with the Soviet Union were broken off, their role was expurgated, as were all other nationalists, until the claim was made that Kim founded the Communist Party in North Korea. He is seldom shown in action during the Korean War, instead, soldiers are depicted as inspired by him. Subsequently, many stories are recounted of his "on-the-spot guidance" in various locations, many of them being openly presented as fictional.

This was supplemented with propaganda on behalf of his son, Kim Jong Il. The North Korean famine of the 1990s, referred to as a "food shortage" by DPRK propaganda, produced anecdotes of Kim insisting on eating the same meager food as other North Koreans.

Propaganda efforts began for the "Young General", Kim Jong Un, who succeeded him as the paramount leader of North Korea on Kim Jong Il's death in December 2011. In July 2026 it was reported that murals of Kim Jong Un were installed across city centres in North Korea.

=== Foreign relations ===
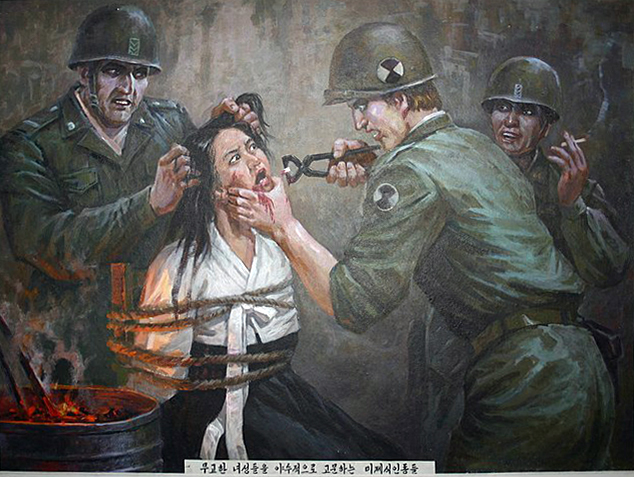
Paintings on the walls of the Sinchon Museum of American War Atrocities depict alleged atrocities carried out by American soldiers during the Korean War.

Early propaganda, in the 1940s, presented a positive Soviet–Korean relationship, often depicting Russians as maternal figures to childlike Koreans. As soon as relations were less cordial, they were expurgated from historical accounts. The collapse of the USSR, without a shot, is often depicted with intense contempt in sources not accessible to Russians.

Americans are depicted particularly negatively. Brian Reynold Myers says that they are presented as an inherently evil race, with whom hostility is the only possible relationship. The Korean War is used as a source for atrocities, less for the bombing raids than on charges of massacre. June 25 is considered the start of "Struggle Against US Imperialism Month" (informally called "Hate America Month" in the U.S. media), which is commemorated by anti-U.S. mass rallies at Kim Il Sung Square in the capital Pyongyang. In 2018, these rallies were cancelled in what the Associated Press called "another sign of detente following the summit between leader Kim Jong Un and U.S. President Donald Trump" that same year.

Japan is frequently depicted as rapacious and dangerous, both in the colonial era and afterward. North Korean propaganda frequently highlighted the danger of Japanese remilitarization. At the same time, the intensity of anti-Japanese propaganda underwent repeated fluctuations, depending on the improvement or deterioration of Japanese-DPRK relations. In those periods when North Korea was on better terms with Japan than with South Korea, North Korean propaganda essentially ignored the Liancourt Rocks dispute. However, if Pyongyang felt threatened by Japanese–South Korean rapprochement or sought to cooperate with Seoul against Tokyo, the North Korean media promptly raised the issue, with the aim of causing friction in Japanese–ROK relations.

According to Myers in 2010, friendly nations are depicted almost exclusively as tributary nations. The English journalist Christopher Hitchens pointed out in the essay "A Nation of Racist Dwarfs" that propaganda has a blatantly racist and nationalistic angle:

North Korean women who return pregnant from China—the regime's main ally and protector—are forced to submit to abortions. Wall posters and banners depicting all Japanese as barbarians are only equaled by the ways in which Americans are caricatured as hook-nosed monsters.

Nevertheless, North Korea analyst Fyodor Tertitskiy states that North Korean propaganda has "never asserted that Koreans are biologically superior" and that in fact, "such a statement was always directly condemned by Kim Jong Il". Instead, "the greatness of the Korean people lies solely in their leader. Koreans are great because they are led by Kim Il Sung, not for any other reason". He also notes that North Korea gives very little weight to racial and nationalists element in its propaganda compared to the cult of personality around its leaders.

==== South Korea ====
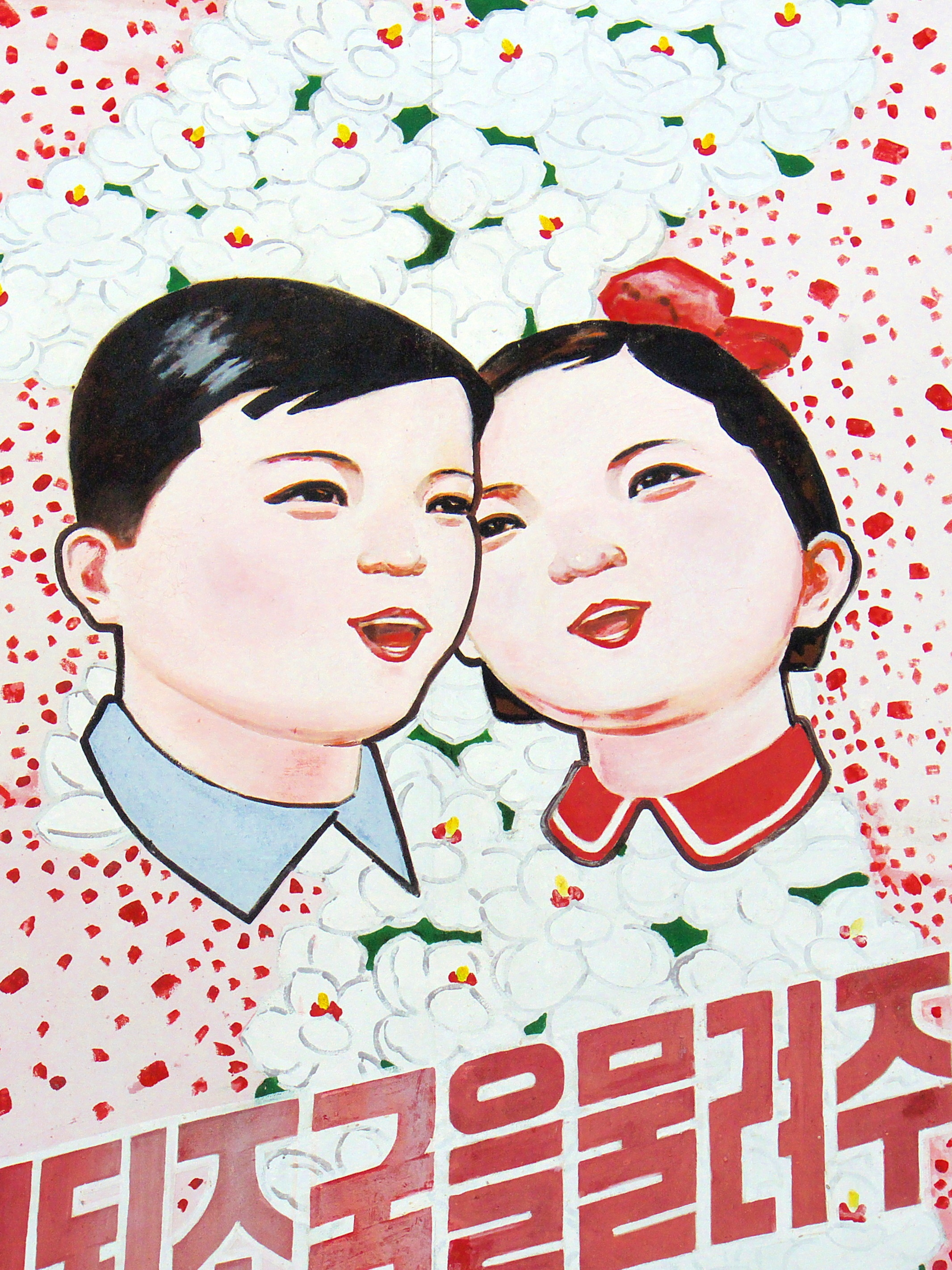
A historical North Korean propaganda poster-wall from 2008 promoting Korean reunification in the near-future, declaring, "Let Us Pass Down A United Country To The Next Generation!". This was located in the North Korean side of the Korean Demilitarized Zone (DMZ).

South Korea was originally depicted as a poverty-stricken land which was run by harsh and cruel dictators backed by the US and where American soldiers based there shot and slaughtered Korean women and children, but by the 1990s, too much information reached North Korea to prevent their learning that South Korea had, by the 1980s, a much stronger economy and higher living standards and quality of life, including political and social freedom, and as a result, North Korean propaganda admitted to it.

=== "Military first" ===
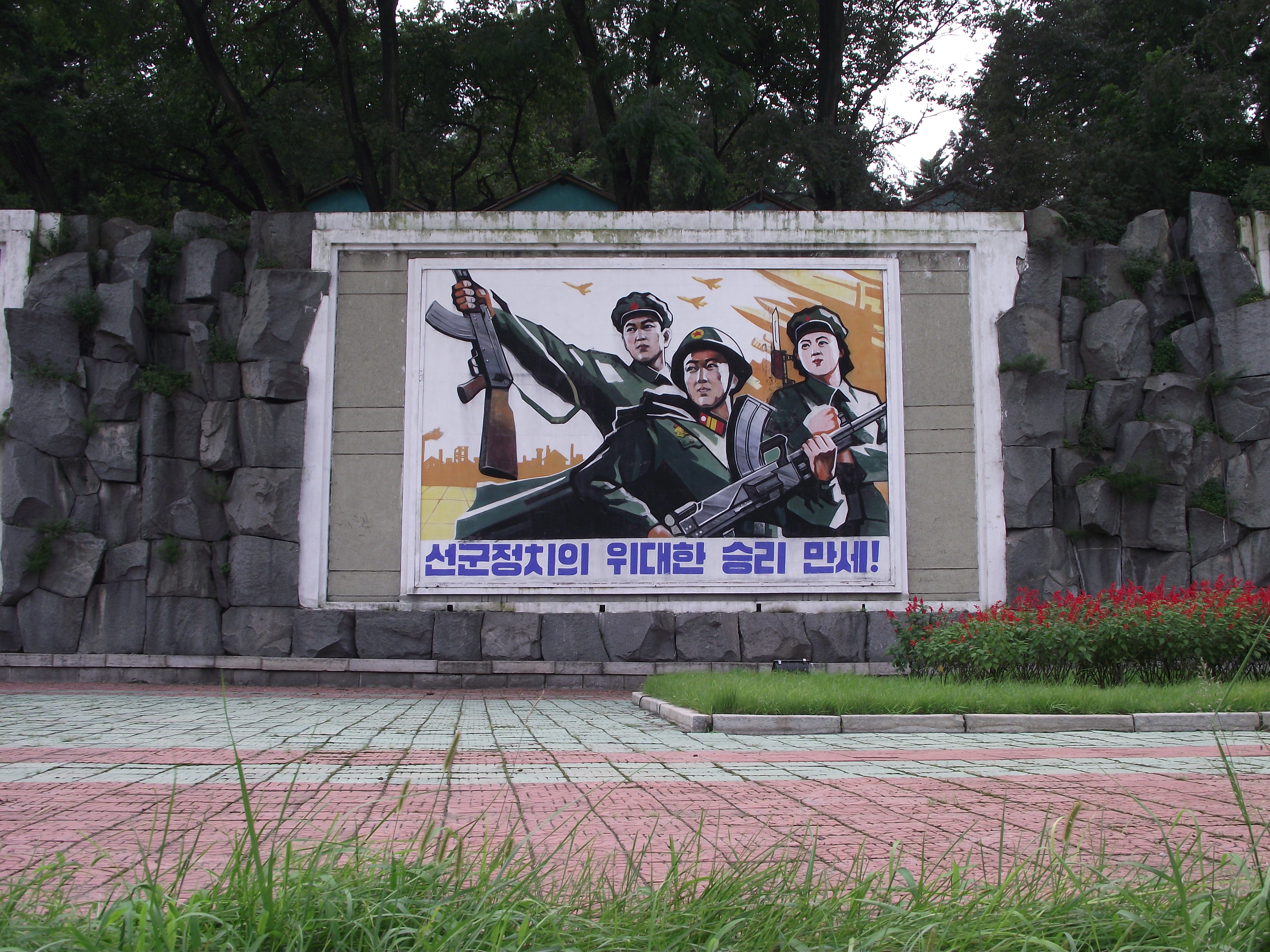
Songun, or "military first", propaganda from 2011

Under Kim Jong Il, a major theme was the need of Kim to attend to the military first of all (in North Korea, this policy is called Songun), which required other Koreans to do without his close attention. This was a shift from the former policy of economic reform and diplomatic engagement. This military life is presented as something that Koreans take spontaneously to, though often disobeying orders from the highest of motives. The diplomatic offensive had failed to yield a normalization of relations with Japan. Meanwhile, relations with Russia remain cold and China was applying direct pressure on Pyongyang, thereby changing the dynamic of the long-standing relationship between the two erstwhile allies.

=== Devotion to the state ===
Romance is often depicted in stories as being triggered solely by the person's model citizenship, as when a beautiful woman is unattractive until a man learns she volunteered to work at a potato farm.

=== Social control ===
The capital city of North Korea has witnessed notable social control since Kim Il Sung's rule, and during as well as after Kim Jong Il's rule. The aerial bombardment of North Korean population centers inflicted the greatest loss of civilian life in the Korean War, which the North Koreans have claimed ever since was America's greatest war crime. Communist Party of Vietnam (CPV) soldiers helped rebuild bridges, elementary schools, factories, and apartments. In February 1955, the 47th Brigade of the CPV rebuilt the Pyongyang Electric Train Factory.

The city's reconstruction was supervised by Kim Il Sung and Kim Jong Il. The DPRK, led by Kim Il Sung and supported by the Soviets, was left with a scene of complete and utter destruction; with the exception of a handful of buildings Pyongyang had been completely flattened. For a young general with socialist ideals, this was seen as a clean slate, on top of which a new country, both physically and ideologically, could be built.

Kim Jong Il favored grand scale buildings and monuments. The giant pyramid of the Ryugyong Hotel building, originally scheduled for completion in time for the 13th World Festival of Youth and Students in 1989, is 105 stories tall. Work on the structure stopped in the early 1990s due to structural defects. The monuments dedicated to Kim Il Sung were not made to be habitable, rather, they need only to look grand. A twenty-meter bronze statue of Kim Il Sung, arm outstretched to encompass his city, sits atop Mansu Hill. Throughout the 1990s, Kim Jong Il had his late father's Kumsusan Palace extensively renovated to house the Great Leader's remains, hiring Russian specialists to embalm the corpse for permanent display. The planning of Pyongyang was unique. It was laid out in a highly symmetrical pattern. Massive, concrete structures are erected with a harmony of pastels. They did not possess the technology to construct any other type of buildings. An example of this is the pyramidal Ryugyong Hotel. There were no advertisements except political banners and portraits of the two Kims. There is very little traffic in the city, allowing for safe road crossing for pedestrians. Technology is in intentionally short supply in Pyongyang. Cell phones, the intranet, and the Internet are a service reserved for those in power. Internet access in North Korea is restricted to a small section of government and business officials who have received state approval, and to foreigners living in or visiting Pyongyang. In the absence of a broadband network, the only option is through satellite internet coverage which is available in some tourist hotels. Mobile phone use was banned in 2004, but service was re-introduced in 2008, jointly operated by the Egyptian Orascom company and the state-owned Korea Post and Telecommunications Corporation. According to the Daily NK website, the new service, despite its cost, proved popular among affluent party members in Pyongyang.

=== Women in North Korea ===
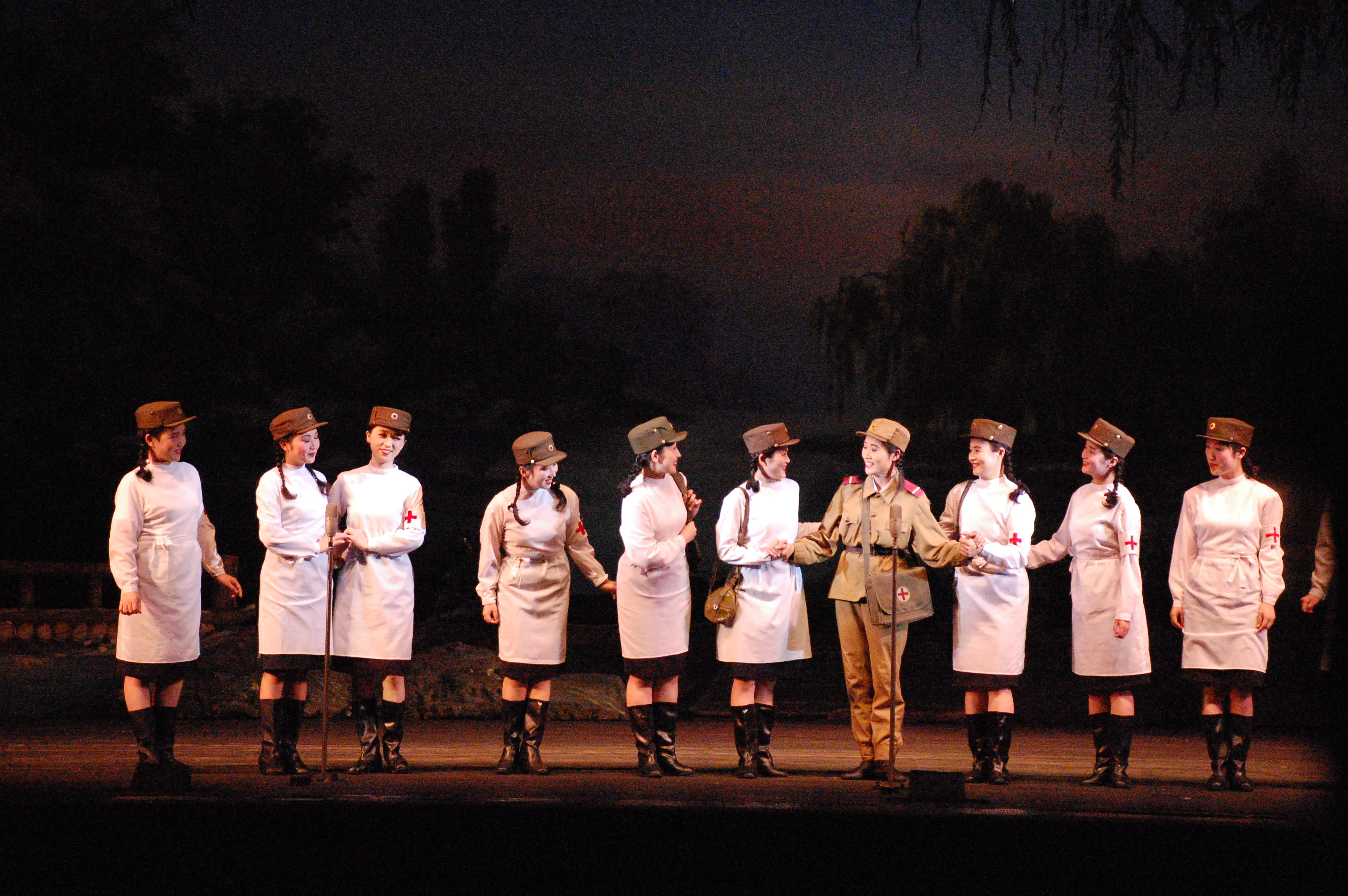
Women playing nurses in the North Korean opera A True Daughter of the Party

The cultural identity of North Korea was deeply rooted in Confucian tradition and intractable Confucian family traditions. Women's identity is seen through the prism of familial relationships. It became a primary aspect of women's lives irrespective of prevalent political regime or social circumstances. Women were considered angels which men had to protect. Women in representative propaganda productions, such as Sea of Blood and The Flower Girl, became not only the focal point of visual composition within the traditional family structure but also the agents of ideological awakening for the newly founded socialist state. Revolutionary operas and numerous other productions depicted as well as forged the new gender order within the structure of the imagined family, which gained supremacy over blood ties. The imagined family was deemed by the degree of commitment to ideological and political struggle, which separated the people from the enemy. Thus, imagining a family was perceived as a process of liberating women and motivating them to have a larger social presence. The colonial experience under occupation by the Japanese, who were traditionally despised as "barbarians," propelled Koreans to evaluate their weakness vis-à-vis the concrete threat to their national sovereignty. Women's backwardness was regarded as directly related to national weakness. In light of their nation's fragile future, Koreans thought women's backwardness to stem from the traditional family life, one of the most ancient institutions in Korean society. Women joined the labor front upon the outbreak of the Korean War. As manpower was concentrated on warfare, industry and agriculture were left to women's care. But even after the war, the North Korean leadership urged women to continue participating actively in the reconstruction of society. The practical social demand created the need for a female labor force and thus women's emancipation from the domestic sphere was legitimized under the pretext of achieving gender equality. As Hunter points out: "In 1947, only 5 percent of industrial workers were women; by 1949, the number had jumped to 15 percent. By 1967, women accounted for almost half of the total workforce." North Korea is a fashion-conscious nation where political leaders strive to dress its people through rigid regulations, imposing uniforms on various social sectors and systematically recommending certain designs to civilians. Some other socialist and authoritarian states glorified masculine clothing as a preferred means to represent revolutionized women. Contrarily, North Korean fashion has continuously expressed degrees of femininity, contradicting the astringent revolutionary spirit often identified with masculinity.

=== Food shortage ===
The North Korean famine was admitted within propaganda to be solely a food shortage, ascribed to bad weather and failure to implement Kim's teachings, but unquestionably better than situations outside North Korea.

The government urged the use of non-nutritious and even harmful "food substitutes" such as sawdust.

== Practices ==
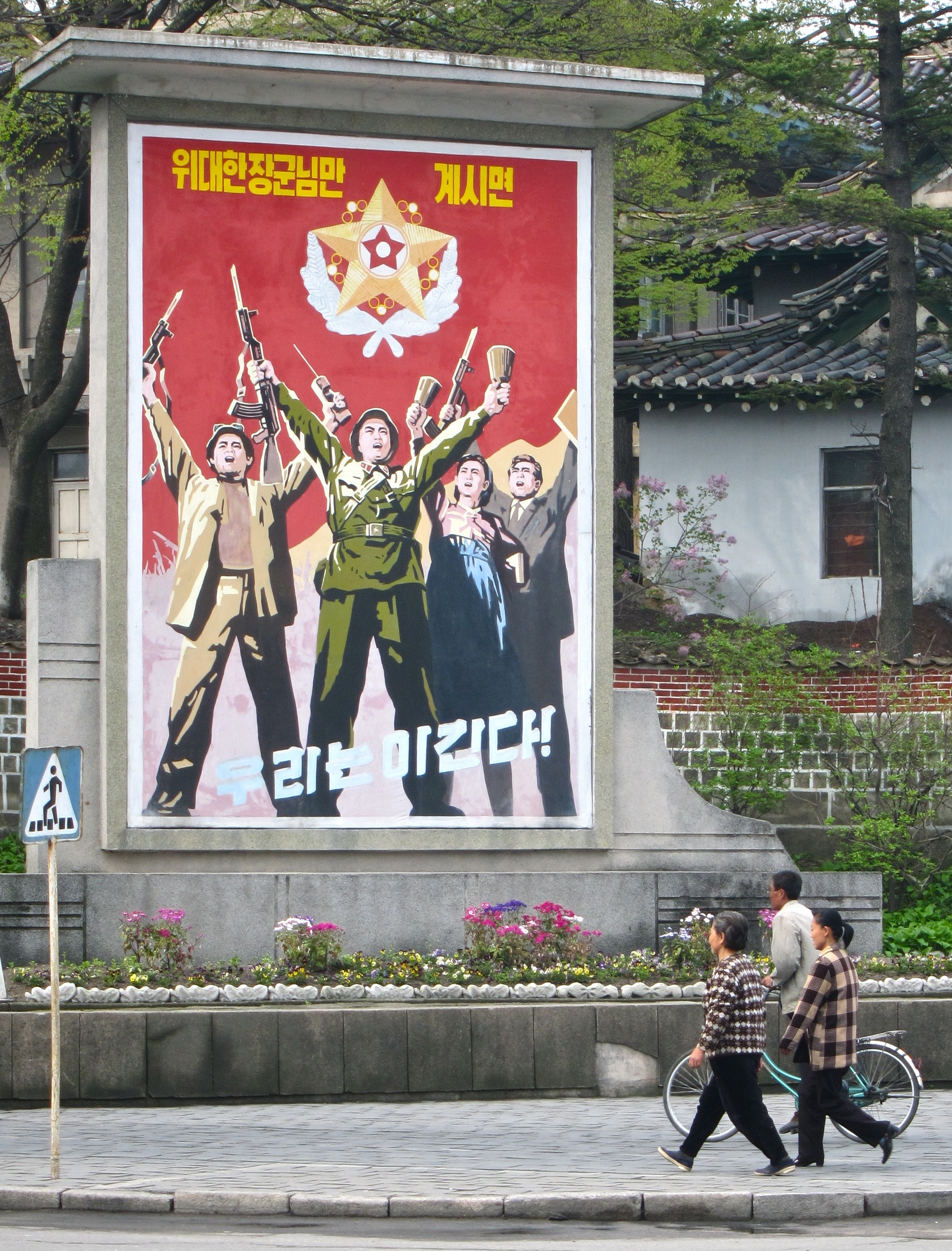
Propaganda poster dedicated to Kim Jong-il from 2010

Every year, a state-owned publishing house, Gold Star Printing Press releases several cartoons (called geurim-chaek (Korean: 그림책) in North Korea), many of which are smuggled across the Chinese border and, sometimes, end up in university libraries in the United States. The books are designed to instill the Juche philosophy of Kim Il Sung (the "father" of North Korea)—radical self-reliance of the state. The plots mostly feature scheming capitalists from the United States and Japan who create dilemmas for naïve North Korean characters.

The propaganda in North Korea is controlled mainly by the Propaganda and Agitation Department of the Workers' Party of Korea.

=== Posters and slogans ===
Posters depict the correct actions for every part of life, down to appropriate clothing. North Korean propaganda posters are very similar to the messages portrayed by socialist countries, focusing on military might, creating a utopian society, devotion to the state, and the leader's personality. Slogans are similar to that of Maoist China, containing calls to action and praises for the leadership.

Propaganda posters are ever-present in both public and private spaces in North Korea. They are constantly updated and changed, reflecting the priorities of the leadership at any given time. According to the state-run Korean Central News Agency, posters are designed for the purpose of "inspiring the working masses' revolutionary enthusiasm through dynamic motivation activities at theaters of general advance toward the glorious congress of the Workers' Party of Korea."

=== Art ===
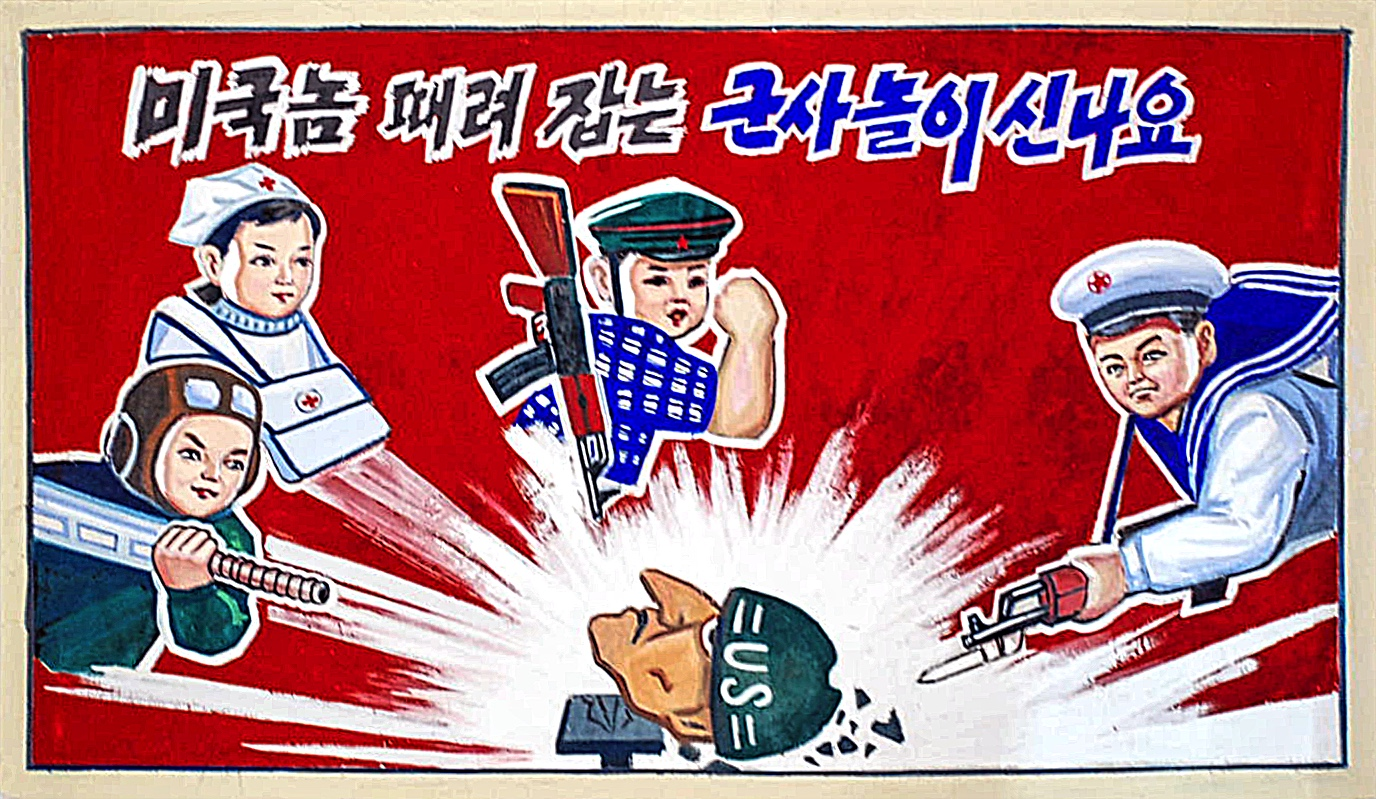
Propaganda poster in a primary school at the Chongsan-ri Farm from 2008

Fine art often depicts militaristic themes. The Flower Girl, a revolutionary opera allegedly penned by Kim Il Sung himself, was turned into a movie, the most popular one in North Korea. It depicts its heroine's sufferings in the colonial era until her partisan brother returns to exact vengeance on their oppressive landlord, at which point she pledges support for the revolution.

=== Music ===
The country's supreme leaders have had hymns dedicated to them that served as their signature tune and were repeatedly broadcast by the state media:

- "Song of General Kim Il Sung" (for Kim Il Sung)
- "Song of General Kim Jong Il" and "No Motherland Without You" (for Kim Jong Il)
- "Footsteps", "Onwards Toward the Final Victory", "We Will Follow You Only" and "Friendly Father" (for Kim Jong Un)

=== Film ===
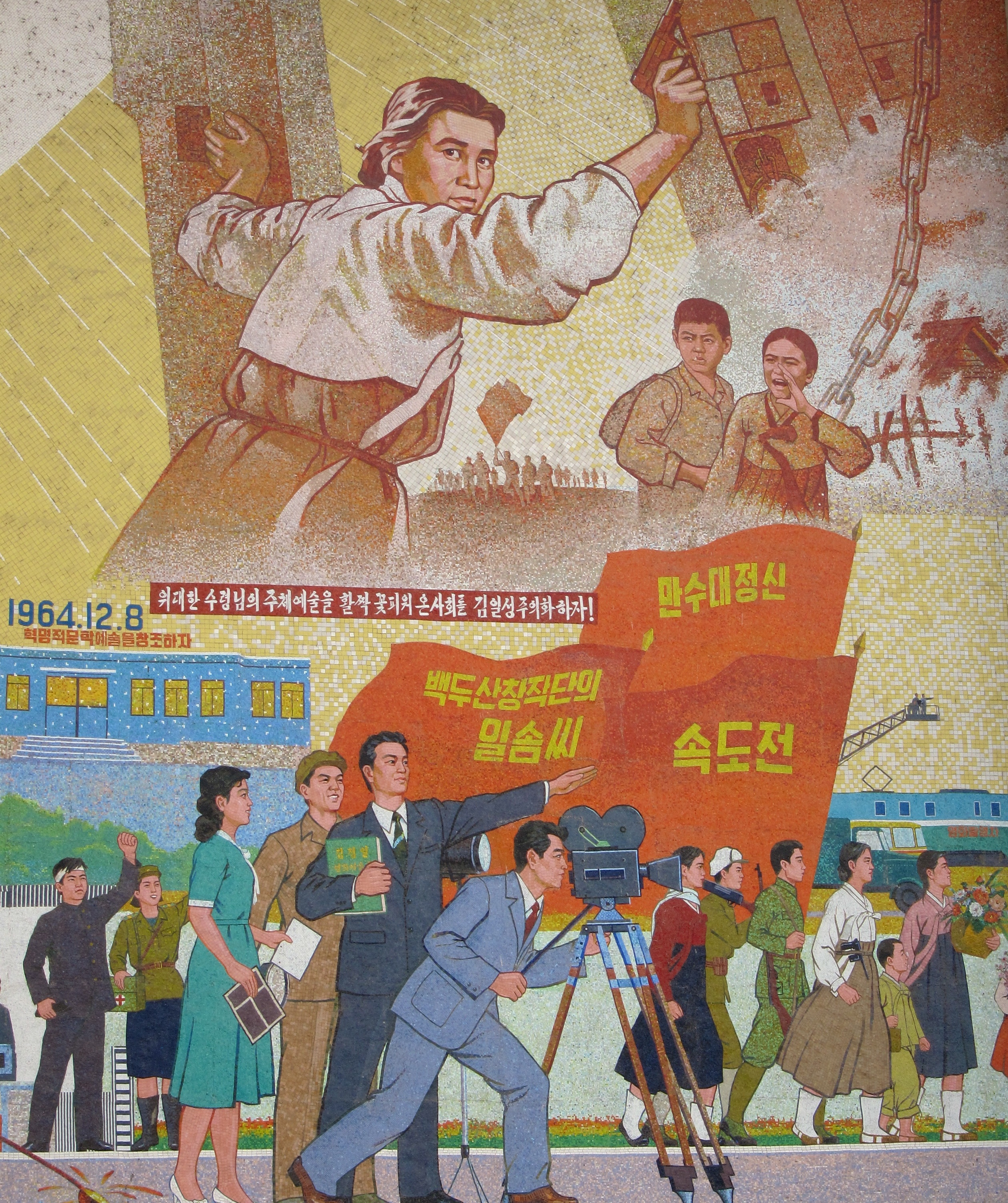
North Korea has a prolific propaganda film industry.

The North Korean government also runs a film industry. North Korean movies depict the glory of North Korean life and the atrocities of Western Imperialism, with a key role of providing on-screen role models. The film industry is run through Pyongyang University of Cinematic and Dramatic Arts. Kim Jong Il was a self-proclaimed genius of film. In 1973, he authored On the Art of the Cinema, a treatise on film theory and filmmaking. He was rumored to own over 20,000 DVDs in his personal collection. Kim believed that cinema was the most important of the arts. Domestically, these films are given lavish receptions. International critics cite the films as propaganda, because of their unreal depictions of North Korea. Recently, there has been an increase in animated films. The animated films carry political and military messages aimed at the youth of North Korea.

=== Leaflets ===
The North Korean government is known for dropping propaganda leaflets to South Korean soldiers, just across the Demilitarized Zone. The leaflets are dropped across in a floating balloon. The leaflets criticize the South Korean government and praise North Korea.

== Social media ==
North Korea made its first entry into the social media market in 2010. The country has launched its own website, Facebook page, YouTube channel, Twitter account, and Flickr page. The profile picture of all social media accounts, according to the official Korean Central News Agency, is the Arch of Reunification (demolished later in 2024), a 30 metres (98 ft) monument in Pyongyang that "reflects the strong will of the 70 million Korean people to achieve the reunification of the country with their concerted effort."

=== Uriminzokkiri ===
Uriminzokkiri was a website that provides Korean-language news and propaganda from North Korea's central news agency. The website offered translation in Korean, Russian, Chinese, Japanese, and English. Uriminzokkiri means 'on our own as our nation'. The website was taken down in 2024.

=== Facebook ===
The North Korean Facebook account, also titled Uriminzokkiri, appeared a week after the South Korean government blocked the North Korean Twitter account. The page represents "the intentions of North and South Koreas and compatriots abroad, who wish for peace, prosperity, and unification of our homeland". There were over 50 posts on Uriminzokkiri's wall, including links to reports that criticize South Korea and the U.S. as "warmongers", photos of picturesque North Korean landscapes and a YouTube video of a dance performance celebrating leader Kim Jong Il, "guardian of the homeland and creator of happiness".

=== YouTube ===
The channel named Uriminzokkiri was opened in July 2010. It has uploaded over 11,000 videos, including clips that condemn and mock South Korea and the U.S. for blaming North Korea for the sinking of a South Korean warship in March 2010. The account has posted videos dubbing United States Secretary of State Hillary Clinton a "Maniac in a Skirt". The account had over 3,000 subscribers and over 3.3 million views as of 28 November 2012; by early 2015, numbers had grown to over 11,000 subscribers and more than 11 million views. On 5 February 2013, a propaganda film that featured New York in flames was blocked and then taken down after Activision pointed out that the video used copyrighted footage from Call of Duty: Modern Warfare 3. The channel was shut down in 2017. In 2023, YouTube deleted three vlogger channels promoting life in North Korea, including that of Im Song A (Sally Parks), an 11-year-old girl who was the daughter of a North Korean diplomat.

=== Twitter ===
The government's official Twitter account was also named Uriminzok. It gained 8,500 followers in the first week. As of 28 November 2012, the account had almost 11,000 followers and had sent out almost 5,000 tweets; by early 2015, the account had sent almost 13,000 messages and had close to 20,000 followers. In January 2011, the Korean-language account was hacked and featured messages calling for North Korean citizens to start an uprising. In April 2013, the country's Twitter account was hacked by the online activist group Anonymous. The account was closed down in 2024.

=== Flickr ===
The Flickr account was started in August 2010 and deactivated in April 2013 but is now active from some point in 2017. The site included many pictures of Kim Jong Un receiving applause from the military; children eating, in school, and enjoying life; booming agriculture; and modern city life. The Uriminzokkiri Flickr account was hacked by Anonymous in April 2013, as part of the group's attack on North Korea's social media accounts.

== Propaganda village ==
Kijong-dong is a village in Pyonghwa-ri, Kaesong-si. It is situated in the North's half of the Korean Demilitarized Zone (DMZ) and is also known in North Korea as "Peace Village" (Korean: 평화촌; MR: P'yŏnghwach'on).

The official position of the North Korean government is that the village contains a 200-family collective farm, serviced by a childcare center, kindergarten, primary and secondary schools, and a hospital. However, observation from South Korea suggests that the town is an uninhabited Potemkin village built at great expense in the 1950s in a propaganda effort to encourage defections from South Korea and to house the DPRK soldiers manning the extensive network of artillery positions, fortifications and underground marshalling bunkers that abut the border zone.

== See also ==
- Propaganda in South Korea
- Communist propaganda
- Voice of Korea
- Censorship in North Korea
- Let's trim our hair in accordance with the socialist lifestyle
