= Pak Se-yong =

North Korean politician and writer (1902–1989)

- Born: 7 July 1902; Seoul, Korean Empire
- Died: 28 February 1989 (aged 86); Pyongyang, North Korea
- Resting place: Patriotic Martyrs' Cemetery
- Occupations: Poet, politician
- Known for: Writing the lyrics of North Korea's national anthem
- Political party: Korean Workers'

Korean name
- Hangul: 박세영
- Hanja: 朴世永
- RR: Bak Seyeong
- MR: Pak Seyŏng

Pak Se-yong (Korean: 박세영; Hanja: 朴世永; 7 July 1902 – 28 February 1989) was a North Korean poet and politician, best known for writing the lyrics of "Aegukka", the national anthem of North Korea.

== Early life ==
Pak was a native of Dumo-ri, outer Old Seoul in what is now Seongdong District, Seoul, South Korea. When he was in his third year at Paichai High School, he made a Doujinshi Saenuri (New world) that was shared among people who shared his dreams as someone involved in literature. After graduating, he enrolled in Yeonhi Professional School (modern-day Yonsei University), but he soon dropped out and studied in Shanghai. In Shanghai, he worked as the China correspondent for Yeomgunsa (焰群社), a socialist cultural organization that was formed in Korea by Song Young, Lee Ho, and Lee Jeok-hyo, whose aim was to research and distribute culture that liberates the proletariat. Eventually, after joining the Korean Artists' Proletarian Federation in 1925, he started writing progressive poetry. From 1923 to 1943, he edited the youth magazine Byeolnara with his comrades, released children's novels and reviews as part of the youth literature movement, and produced his first collection of poems called Sanjebi. Post-1945, his work began to have a realist trend. In 1946, he crossed over to the Soviet-controlled northern half of the Korean Peninsula, allegedly as a result of the foreign occupation of the south, shattering his hopes.

== In politics ==
Pak became involved in North Korean politics from the country's earliest days. In 1948, he became a member of the Supreme People's Assembly. In May 1954, he was named a member of the central committee of the General League of Culture and Art. In October 1956, he was elevated to the standing committee of the Writers League. In 1961, he became a member of the central committee of the newly created Committee for the Peaceful Reunification of the Fatherland.

== Poetry ==
Pak finished writing the lyrics of "Aegukka" in June 1947. Other representative works of his include the lyric poems "The sunrise at Poch'onbo" (1962), "History of Millim" (1962), and "When a fire is lit in the heart" (1963). His other famous song was The Glorious Motherland.

== See also ==
- Baek Seok
- Cho Ki-chon
- Jang Jin-sung
- Kim Won-gyun
