= The Glorious Motherland =

- Hangul: 빛나는 조국
- Hanja: 빛나는 祖國
- RR: Binnaneun joguk
- MR: Pinnanŭn choguk

"The Glorious Motherland" (Korean: 빛나는 조국) is a song of North Korea. (Note: The translation "The Glorious Motherland" for "빛나는 조국" follows that of Rodong Sinmun. See e.g.: "Art Performance Given to Celebrate Successful Test-fire of Hwasong-14". July 10, 2017. Archived from the original on July 31, 2018.) It was composed by Ri Myon Sang (리면상) in 1947, and its lyrics were written by Pak Se-yong (박세영).

== History ==
In 1946-1947 when North Korea had no national anthem, composition of the anthem called Aegukka was undertaken under the leadership of Kim Il Sung. In 1947, two candidates remained for the final judgement, and one of the two was selected for the anthem. The other one, apparently which is known today as "The Glorious Motherland," was also decided to be opened to the public with its title changed from Aegukka, as the melody was excellent. This song is listed in songbooks of that time as one of the representative songs, e.g. "조쏘歌曲100曲集 (Korea-Soviet Collection of 100 Songs)" (北朝鮮音樂同盟 (Ed.), 1949).

With such a background, this song has been used in principal events of North Korea. The song is broadcast at the sign-off of Korean Central Television with the image of fluttering national flag.

== See also ==
- Aegukka
- Music of North Korea
