= Jang Jin-sung =

North Korean defector (born 1970/1971)

- Born: c. 1970–1971 (age 54–56); Sariwon, North Korea
- Occupations: Poet, intelligence officer, propaganda officer

- Jang Jin-sung
- Hangul: 장진성
- Hanja: 張真晟
- RR: Jang Jinseong
- MR: Chang Chinsŏng

Jang Jin-sung (Korean: 장진성; born c. 1970–1971) is the pseudonym of a North Korean poet and government official who defected to South Korea. He had worked as a psychological warfare officer within the United Front Department of the Korean Workers' Party. Jang specifically worked within the United Front Department Section 5 (Literature), Division 19 (Poetry) of Office 101. Office 101 created propaganda intended to encourage South Korean sympathy for North Korea. One of Jang's job duties was to create poetry under a South Korean pseudonym Kim Kyong-min and in a South Korean style. His poetry was intended for distribution within South Korea.

== Biography ==
Jang claims to have been one of the late North Korean leader Kim Jong Il's favored propaganda poets. This favoritism occurred after Jang wrote the epic poem Spring Rests on the Gun Barrel of the Lord as part of recurring competitive poetry writing among different North Korean Government departments. Kim Jong Il liked the poem so much it was redistributed in North Korea in 1999. Kim Jong Il's favoritism gained Jang the class status of "The Admitted" for which Jang received extra food rations and political protections.

According to Jang's account, he was forced to flee the country for his life after his friend Hwang Young-Min lost a forbidden book from his department on the Pyongyang Metro. As the North Korean State Security Department pursued them, they obtained a fake travel pass and travelled to the north of the country, where they fled across the frozen Tumen River into China. After a long period of hiding in China, Jang defected to South Korea in 2004 by reaching the embassy in Beijing; however, Young-min separated from him during their escape and while he was awaiting repatriation back to North Korea after being arrested by the Chinese police, Young-min committed suicide to avoid repatriation and retribution from the North Korean authorities for his escape. Young-min's uncle later identified and claimed his body.

A few months after arriving in South Korea, in January 2005, Jang became a Senior Analyst for the National Security Research Institute in Seoul, South Korea. The National Security Research Institute is part of the National Intelligence Service of South Korea. In 2010, he left the National Security Research Institute.

In 2011, Jang used his severance to start North Korean defectors' magazine New Focus International (뉴포커스). The magazine aims to report on North Korean news without North Korean media restrictions.

According to Jang, as of 2013, the North Korean government still threatens the life of Jang Jin-sung through statements made through the North Korea controlled media.

Jang Jin-sung wrote about his journey of defecting in his 2014 book, Dear Leader: Poet, Spy, Escapee - A Look Inside North Korea.

In 2021, Jang Jin-Sung was accused by two women of several counts of rape and sexual coercion over the course of several years. While he denied the charges by the first, he has claimed a consensual relationship with the second. In 2022, he was sentenced by a South Korean court to six months in prison, after being found guilty of a sexual crime against a former female coworker. In 2024 he won a defamation lawsuit against his accuser.

== Works ==
- Memoirs Crossing
- Poetry collection "I Am Selling My Daughter for 100 Won" ("내 딸을 백원에 팝니다") (Japanese 2009, English 2010)
- Kim Jong-il's last woman (김정일의 마지막 여자)
- 시를 품고 강을 넘다 (Japan 2012)
- Dear Leader: Poet, Spy, Escapee - A Look Inside North Korea (2014)

== See also ==
- Baek Seok
- Cho Ki-chon
- Pak Se-yong
