= Friendly Father =

North Korean pop song and propaganda hymn

- Music video title card

Song
- Language: Korean (Munhwaŏ)
- Released: 16 April 2024
- Venue: Pyongyang, North Korea
- Genre: North Korean pop; electro pop
- Length: 3:53
- Songwriter: An Pun Hui
- Composer: Jong Chun Il

Audio sample
- Chorus: file; help

Korean name
- Hangul: 친근한 어버이
- RR: Chingeunhan eobeoi
- MR: Ch'in'gŭnhan ŏbŏi

"Friendly Father" or "Friendly Parent" (Note: Although the song title is commonly translated as "Friendly Father", 어버이 actually means "parent(s)", not "father".) is a North Korean pop song and propaganda hymn praising the country's third and current supreme leader, Kim Jong Un. It was written by An Pun Hui and composed by Jong Chun Il. The song was first played on 16 April 2024, at a ceremony celebrating the completion of new apartment buildings in the country's capital, Pyongyang.

"Friendly Father" received considerable media attention outside of Korea due to its popularity on social media platforms like TikTok, where hundreds of users had uploaded videos of themselves listening or dancing to the song shortly after its release.

== Release ==
"Friendly Father" debuted on 16 April 2024, sung live by Kim Ryu Kyong (no relation) (Note: No relation to Kim Jong Un. Kim is the most common Korean surname.) at a ceremony celebrating the completion of 10,000 new apartment units in the Hwasong district of Pyongyang. Such ceremonies are common in North Korea and broadcast on state media to promote the ruling Workers' Party of Korea. The music video for "Friendly Father" was released the next day and played on the state-controlled Korean Central Television. The video features scenes of soldiers, students, and workers singing the song, as well as crowds eagerly meeting Kim Jong Un.

== Style and composition ==
"Friendly Father" has been described as "upbeat" and "catchy". Peter Moody, a North Korea analyst and visiting professor at Korea University, compared the song's style to that of Swedish supergroup ABBA, pointing to the shared use of a "rich set of orchestral-sounding sequences". This comparison was echoed by several users of the social media platform TikTok, where the song had gone viral. Frances Mao of the BBC identified the song's genre as "synthy-electro pop". The music was composed by Jong Chun Il. The lyrics of "Friendly Father", written by An Pun Hui, encourage the listener to praise Kim Jong Un as a "friendly father" and a "great leader".

== Reactions ==
=== North Korea ===
On the front page of its 20 April 2024 edition, the state-run Rodong Sinmun newspaper published an editorial which stated: "'Friendly Father' has created a storm of reactions ... and warmed the hearts of tens of millions of people across the country as soon as it was released." Conversely, Daily NK – based in Seoul, South Korea, and citing an unnamed source – reported negative reactions from residents of North Korea's North Hamgyong Province, who juxtaposed their living conditions with the song's lyrics. North Hamgyong is an underdeveloped province and was the first to be affected by the famine of the 1990s.

=== South Korea ===
The Korea Communications Standards Commission blocked the music video for "Friendly Father" at the request of the National Intelligence Service (NIS). The commission also blocked 29 alternate versions of the video. An NIS official stated the video was a violation of article 44, paragraph 7 of the Information and Communications Network Act, which "prohibits the distribution of illegal information", including North Korean government–produced content outlawed by the National Security Act. The commission's official statement on the block read in part: "The video is typical content linked to psychological warfare against South Korea, as it was posted on a channel operated to connect with the outside world and is mainly focused on unilaterally idolising and glorifying Kim [Jong Un]."

=== Outside of Korea ===
"Friendly Father" gained significant traction online in social media spaces outside of Korea, particularly on TikTok. In the two weeks following the song's release, hundreds of videos were uploaded to TikTok of users listening or dancing to the song.

Analysts have described the song's reception on TikTok as a mix of genuine enjoyment and comedic ridicule. Emma Briant, a British specialist on propaganda and information warfare, argues that while the North Korean government likely did not expect the song to go viral on social media, they are nonetheless "not naive about how this may look to Western audiences". Briant further argues that "[the song] is obviously intended for this kind of mass distribution", but also that "North Korea does not necessarily put this out around the world expecting it to be taken seriously", opining that it was likely "created deliberately to be humorous".

== See also ==
- Military-First Girls – Japanese fan club of North Korea's Moranbong Band
- Music of North Korea
- Propaganda in North Korea
