= Aegukka =

National anthem of North Korea

National Anthem of the Democratic People's Republic of Korea
- 조선민주주의인민공화국 국가
- Sheet music atop the North Korean state emblem
- National anthem of North Korea
- Also known as: (English: Song of a Devotion to a Country)
- Lyrics: Pak Se-yong, 1946, 2024 (modified)
- Music: Kim Won-gyun, 1945
- Adopted: 1947

Audio sample
- Instrumental audio: file; help

- Aegukka
- Hangul: 애국가
- Hanja: 愛國歌
- Lit.: Song of Loving One's Country
- RR: Aegukga
- MR: Aegukka

The National Anthem of North Korea was known as Aegukka (Note: Korean: 애국가; Hanja: 愛國歌) until 2024. It was composed in 1945 as a patriotic song celebrating independence from Japanese occupation and was adopted as the state anthem in 1947.

In 2023, Kim Jong Un announced an end to attempts at reunifying with South Korea. The following year, the song’s second line, “The country of three thousand ri,” was replaced to remove its reference to a unified Korean nation. Ri is the length of a Korean mile (equivalent to 0.24 imperial miles) and a reference to the length of the Korean peninsula.

The title was also changed to remove references to the South Korean patriotic song Aegukga. The text of the Constitution was altered to officially rename the anthem to the "National Anthem of the Democratic People's Republic of Korea" (조선민주주의공화국 국가).

Performance of this anthem is prohibited in South Korea under the National Security Act.

== Etymology ==
"Aegukka" is a Romanized transliteration of "The Patriotic Song"; the song is also known by its incipit Ach'imŭn pinnara or "Let Morning Shine" or in its Korean name 아침은 빛나라 or alternatively as the "Song of a Devotion to a Country".

The Encyclopedia of Korean Culture defines the word "Aegukka" as "the song to wake up the mind to love the country". "Aegukka" in itself is differentiated from a national anthem. While a national anthem or gukka (lit. 'country song') is an official symbol of the state, aegukka refers to any song, official or unofficial, that contains patriotic fervor towards its country, such as Hungary's "Szózat" or the U.S. "The Stars and Stripes Forever". However, the nationally designated "Aegukka" plays the role of symbolizing the country. In general shorthand, the term aegukka refers to the national anthem of North Korea.

== History ==
Originally, the Korean exile government (1919–1945) in Shanghai, China adopted as their national anthem "Aegukga" (which has the same name with a different Romanization) to the tune of "Auld Lang Syne". After World War II, South Korea kept the words, put to a new tune (changed from "Auld Lang Syne"). North Korea briefly used Aegukga with Auld Lang Syne but subsequently adopted this newly written piece in 1947. The words were written by Pak Se-yong and the music was composed by Kim Won-gyun.

In the early 1980s, Kim Jong Il sought to reduce the song's importance to the benefit of "Song of General Kim Il Sung".

The complete version of "Aegukka" consists two verses. On official occasions, when only the first verse is performed, it is customary to repeat the last four bars. However, if both verses are performed, it is the last four bars of the second verse that are repeated instead. "Song of General Kim Il Sung" and "Song of General Kim Jong Il" have since taken the place of de facto national anthems domestically, and "Aegukka" is reserved for representing North Korea internationally: when foreign dignitaries visit the country or North Korean athletes compete at international sporting competitions. "Aegukka" is almost unique among most North Korean patriotic songs, as it praises neither the Workers' Party of Korea nor the Kim family, but rather the whole of Korea itself. "Aegukka" is played at the start of each of Korean Central Broadcasting Station, Voice of Korea and Korean Central Television's broadcast days.

In February 2024, in line with Kim Jong Un's announcement of officially abandoning efforts to peacefully reunifying Korea, the lyrics were partially modified, with the phrase "three thousand ri" (삼천리; 三千里) referring to the Korean Peninsula being replaced by "this world" (이 세상; 이 世上).

On 17 April 2024, a ceremony was held to celebrate the completion of 10,000 new homes in Hwasong District, Pyongyang, in which the national anthem was performed. This was broadcast on Korea Central Television, and was rebroadcast on the next day, 18 April. However, during the rebroadcast, the title was changed from Aegukka (애국가; 愛國歌) to "National Anthem of the Democratic People's Republic of Korea" (조선민주주의인민공화국 국가; 朝鮮民主主義人民共和國 國歌). It has been speculated that this was done to further strengthen the division between the north and south after North Korea abandoned the idea of peaceful reunification, by giving the national anthem a different title to that of South Korea. On 25 October 2024, the Standing Committee of the Supreme People's Assembly adopted the "Law of the DPRK on the National Anthem", without reporting what the new law mandates. The Constitution of North Korea was also amended to change the name of the anthem from Aegukka to the "National Anthem of the Democratic People's Republic of Korea".

== Lyrics ==
=== 2024–present ===
Chosŏn'gŭl

I
아침은 빛나라 이 강산
은금에 자원도 가득한
이 세상 아름다운 내 조국
반만년 오랜 력사에
𝄆 찬란한 문화로 자라난
슬기론 인민의 이 영광
몸과 맘 다 바쳐 이 조선
길이 받드세 𝄇

II
백두산 기상을 다 안고
근로의 정신은 깃들어
진리로 뭉쳐진 억센 뜻
온 세계 앞서 나가리
𝄆 솟는 힘 노도도 내밀어
인민의 뜻으로 선 나라
한없이 부강하는 이 조선
길이 빛내세 𝄇

Hanja and Chosŏn'gŭl

I
아침은 빛나라 이 江山
銀金에 資源도 가득한
이 世上 아름다운 내 祖國
半萬年 오랜 歷史에
𝄆 燦爛한 文化로 자라난
슬기론 人民의 이 榮光
몸과 맘 다 바쳐 이 朝鮮
길이 받드세 𝄇

II
白頭山 氣像을 다 안고
勤勞의 精神은 깃들어
眞理로 뭉쳐진 억센 뜻
온 世界 앞서 나가리
𝄆 솟는 힘 怒濤도 내밀어
人民의 뜻으로 선 나라
限없이 富强하는 이 朝鮮
길이 빛내세 𝄇

Official romanization

I
Achimŭn pinnara i kangsan
Ŭn'gŭme jawŏndo kadŭkhan
I sesang arŭmdaun nae joguk
Panmannyŏn oraen ryŏksaë
𝄆 Challanhan munhwaro jaranan
Sŭlgiron inminŭi i yŏnggwang
Momgwa mam ta pachyŏ i Chosŏn
Kiri pattŭse 𝄇

II
Paektusan kisangŭl ta anko
Kŭlloŭi jŏngsinŭn kittŭrŏ
Jilliro mungchyŏjin ŏksen ttŭt
On segye apsŏ nagari
𝄆 Sonnŭn him nododo naemirŏ
Inminŭi ttŭsŭro sŏn nara
Hanŏpsi puganghanŭn i Chosŏn
Kiri pinnaese 𝄇

Revised Romanization of Korean

I
Achimeun binnara i gangsan
Eun'geume jawondo gadeukhan
I sesang areumdaun nae joguk
Banmannyeon oraen ryeoksa'e
𝄆 Challanhan munhwaro jaranan
Seulgiron inminui i yeonggwang
Momgwa mam da bacheo i Joseon
Giri batdeuse 𝄇

II
Baekdusan gisang'eul da an'go
Geulloui jeongsineun gitdeureo
Jilliro mungcheojin eoksen tteut
On segye apseo nagari
𝄆 Sonneun him nododo naemireo
Inminui tteuseuro seon nara
Haneopsi buganghaneun i Joseon
Giri binnaese 𝄇

IPA transcription (Note: See Help:IPA and North–South differences in the Korean language § Pronunciation.)

1
[a̠.ˈt͡sʰim.ɯn ˈpʰin.na̠.ɾa̠ i ga̠ŋ.ˈsʰa̠n]
[ɯn.ˈgɯm.e̞ ˈt͡sʰa̠.wɔn.do̞ ˈkʰa̠.dɯ.kʰa̠n]
[i ˈsʰe̞.sʰa̠ŋ ˈa̠.ɾɯm.da̠.wʊn nɛ̝ t͡so̞.ˈgʊk̚]
[pʰa̠n.ˈma̠n.ɲjɔn ˈo̞.ɾɛ̝n ˈɾjɔk.s͈a̠.je̞]
𝄆 [t͡sʰa̠ɭ.ˈɭa̠n.ɦa̠n ˈmʊn.(βʷ)a̠.ɾo̞ ˈt͡sa̠.ɾa̠.na̠n]
[sʰɯɭ.ˈgi.ɾo̞n ˈin.min.ɛ̝ (j)i jɔŋ.ˈgʷa̠ŋ]
[mo̞m.ˈgʷa̠ ma̠m ta̠ ba̠.t͡sʰjɔ (j)i t͡so̞.ˈsʰɔn]
[kʰiɾ.ˈi ˈpʰa̠t̚.t͈ɯ.sʰe̞] 𝄇

2
[pʰɛ̝k̚.ˈt͈ʊ.sʰa̠n ˈkʰi.sʰa̠ŋ.ɯɭ tʰa̠ a̠n.ko̞]
[kʰɯɭ.ˈɭo̞.ɛ̝ ˈt͡sʰɔŋ.sin.ɯn ˈgit̚.t͈ɯɾ.ɔ]
[t͡sʰiɭ.ˈʎi.ɾo̞ ˈmʊŋ.t͡sʰjɔ.d͡zin ˈɔk.s͈e̞n t͈ɯt̚]
[o̞n ˈsʰe̞.ɡje̞ ˈa̠p.s͈ɔ na̠.ga̠.ˈɾi]
𝄆 [sʰo̞n.ˈnɯn ɦim ˈno̞.do̞.do̞ ˈnɛ̝.miɾ.ɔ]
[in.ˈmin.ɛ̝ ˈt͈ɯsʰ.ɯ.ɾo̞ sʰo̞n na̠.ˈɾa̠]
[ha̠n.ˈɔp̚s.i ˈbʊ.ga̠ŋ.ɦa̠.nɯn i t͡so̞.ˈsʰɔn]
[kʰiɾ.ˈi ˈpʰin.nɛ̝.sʰe̞] 𝄇

English translation from the Ministry of Foreign Affairs of the DPRK

I
Shine bright, you dawn, on this land so fair,
Over the world, dazzles my country.
So rich in silver and in gold you are,
Five thousand years of your history.
𝄆 Our people ever were renowned and sage,
And rich in cultural heritage,
And as with heart and soul, we strive,
Korea shall forever thrive! 𝄇

II
And in the spirit of Mount Paektu,
With the love of toil that shall never die,
With a will of iron fostered by the truth,
We'll lead the whole world by and by.
𝄆 We have the might to foil the angry sea,
Our land more prosperous still shall be,
As by the people's will we strive,
Korea shall forever thrive! 𝄇

=== 1947–2024 ===
Chosŏn'gŭl

I
아침은 빛나라 이 강산
은금에 자원도 가득한
삼천리 아름다운 내 조국
반만년 오랜 력사에
𝄆 찬란한 문화로 자라난
슬기론 인민의 이 영광
몸과 맘 다 바쳐 이 조선
길이 받드세 𝄇

II
백두산 기상을 다 안고
근로의 정신은 깃들어
진리로 뭉쳐진 억센 뜻
온 세계 앞서 나가리
𝄆 솟는 힘 노도도 내밀어
인민의 뜻으로 선 나라
한없이 부강하는 이 조선
길이 빛내세 𝄇

Hanja and Chosŏn'gŭl

I
아침은 빛나라 이 江山
銀金에 資源도 가득한
三千里 아름다운 내 祖國
半萬年 오랜 歷史에
𝄆 燦爛한 文化로 자라난
슬기론 人民의 이 榮光
몸과 맘 다 바쳐 이 朝鮮
길이 받드세 𝄇

II
白頭山 氣像을 다 안고
勤勞의 精神은 깃들어
眞理로 뭉쳐진 억센 뜻
온 世界 앞서 나가리
𝄆 솟는 힘 怒濤도 내밀어
人民의 뜻으로 선 나라
限없이 富强하는 이 朝鮮
길이 빛내세 𝄇

McCune–Reischauer Romanization

I
Ach'imŭn pinnara i kangsan
Ŭn'gŭme chawŏndo kadŭkhan
Samch'ŏlli arŭmdaun nae choguk
Panmannyŏn oraen ryŏksaë
𝄆 Ch'allanhan munhwaro charanan
Sŭlgiron inminŭi i yŏnggwang
Momgwa mam ta pach'yŏ i Chosŏn
Kiri pattŭse 𝄇

II
Paektusan kisangŭl ta anko
Kŭlloŭi chŏngsinŭn kittŭrŏ
Chilliro mungch'yŏjin ŏksen ttŭt
On segye apsŏ nagari
𝄆 Sonnŭn him nododo naemirŏ
Inminŭi ttŭsŭro sŏn nara
Hanŏpsi puganghanŭn i Chosŏn
Kiri pinnaese 𝄇

Revised Romanization of Korean

I
Achimeun binnara i gangsan
Eun'geume jawondo gadeukhan
Samcheolli areumdaun nae joguk
Banmannyeon oraen ryeoksa'e
𝄆 Challanhan munhwaro jaranan
Seulgiron inminui i yeonggwang
Momgwa mam da bacheo i Joseon
Giri batdeuse 𝄇

II
Baekdusan gisang'eul da an'go
Geulloui jeongsineun gitdeureo
Jilliro mungcheojin eoksen tteut
On segye apseo nagari
𝄆 Sonneun him nododo naemireo
Inminui tteuseuro seon nara
Haneopsi buganghaneun i Joseon
Giri binnaese 𝄇

IPA transcription

1
[a̠.ˈt͡sʰim.ɯn ˈpʰin.na̠.ɾa̠ i ga̠ŋ.ˈsʰa̠n]
[ɯn.ˈgɯm.e̞ ˈt͡sʰa̠.wɔn.do̞ ˈkʰa̠.dɯ.kʰa̠n]
[sʰa̠m.ˈt͡sʰɔɭ.ʎi ˈa̠.ɾɯm.da̠.wʊn nɛ̝ t͡so̞.ˈgʊk̚]
[pʰa̠n.ˈma̠n.ɲjɔn ˈo̞.ɾɛ̝n ˈɾjɔk.s͈a̠.je̞]
𝄆 [t͡sʰa̠ɭ.ˈɭa̠n.ɦa̠n ˈmʊn.(βʷ)a̠.ɾo̞ ˈt͡sa̠.ɾa̠.na̠n]
[sʰɯɭ.ˈgi.ɾo̞n ˈin.min.ɛ̝ (j)i jɔŋ.ˈgʷa̠ŋ]
[mo̞m.ˈgʷa̠ ma̠m ta̠ ba̠.t͡sʰjɔ (j)i t͡so̞.ˈsʰɔn]
[kʰiɾ.ˈi ˈpʰa̠t̚.t͈ɯ.sʰe̞] 𝄇

2
[pʰɛ̝k̚.ˈt͈ʊ.sʰa̠n ˈkʰi.sʰa̠ŋ.ɯɭ tʰa̠ a̠n.ko̞]
[kʰɯɭ.ˈɭo̞.ɛ̝ ˈt͡sʰɔŋ.sin.ɯn ˈgit̚.t͈ɯɾ.ɔ]
[t͡sʰiɭ.ˈʎi.ɾo̞ ˈmʊŋ.t͡sʰjɔ.d͡zin ˈɔk.s͈e̞n t͈ɯt̚]
[o̞n ˈsʰe̞.ɡje̞ ˈa̠p.s͈ɔ na̠.ga̠.ˈɾi]
𝄆 [sʰo̞n.ˈnɯn ɦim ˈno̞.do̞.do̞ ˈnɛ̝.miɾ.ɔ]
[in.ˈmin.ɛ̝ ˈt͈ɯsʰ.ɯ.ɾo̞ sʰo̞n na̠.ˈɾa̠]
[ha̠n.ˈɔp̚s.i ˈbʊ.ga̠ŋ.ɦa̠.nɯn i t͡so̞.ˈsʰɔn]
[kʰiɾ.ˈi ˈpʰin.nɛ̝.sʰe̞] 𝄇

English translation from Kim Il Sung University

I
Shine bright, you dawn, on this land so fair,
The country of three thousand ri,
So rich in silver and in gold you are,
Five thousand years of your history.
𝄆 Our people ever were renowned and sage,
And rich in cultural heritage,
And as with heart and soul, we strive,
Korea shall forever thrive! 𝄇

II
And in the spirit of Mount Paektu,
With the love of toil that shall never die,
With a will of iron fostered by the truth,
We'll lead the whole world by and by.
𝄆 We have the might to foil the angry sea,
Our land more prosperous still shall be,
As by the people's will we strive,
Korea shall forever thrive! 𝄇

== See also ==
- National symbols of North Korea
