= Kim Won-gyun =

Composer of the North Korean anthem (1917–2002)

- Born: 2 January 1917; Wonsan, Kōgen Province (Gangwon Province), Korea, Empire of Japan
- Died: 5 April 2002 (aged 85)
- Occupations: Composer, politician
- Era: 20th century

- Kim Won-gyun
- Hangul: 김원균
- Hanja: 金元均
- RR: Gim Wongyun
- MR: Kim Wŏn'gyun

Kim Won-gyun (Korean: 김원균; 2 January 1917 – 5 April 2002) was a North Korean composer and politician. He is considered one of the most prominent, if not the most celebrated, composer of North Korea. He composed "Aegukka" — the national anthem of the country — and "Song of General Kim Il Sung", in addition to revolutionary operas.

== Career ==
In his youth, Kim Won-gyun attended high school but dropped out after three grades. After the liberation of Korea, he wrote his first composition: "March of Korea". Before his musical career, Kim had been only "a farmer who just happened to write [the] 'Song of General Kim Il Sung'". That was in 1946, very early into the cult of personality of Kim Il Sung; the song was the first work of art that verifiably mentions Kim Il Sung, then leader of Workers' Party of North Korea, one of precursors of WPK. After the success of the song, he was asked to compose "Aegukka". As a musician, he was initially self-taught but went to Moscow in order to study there. At some point he attended a music school in Japan. By 1947, when "Aegukka" was adapted as the national anthem of Provisional People's Committee of North Korea, he had risen in status. Other compositions by Kim include: "Democratic Youth March", "Our Supreme Commander", "Glory to the Workers' Party of Korea (WPK)", "Sunrise on Mt. Paektu", "Steel-strong Ranks Advance", "Song of Great National Unity", "We Rush Forward in Spirit of Chollima", and "Song of Anti-Imperialist Struggle".

Kim is credited with contributing to "the creation of the 'Sea of Blood' -type revolutionary operas". It is possible that he worked on the operatic version of Sea of Blood and a symphony based on music from the opera. He is also credited with the opera Chirisan.

Kim served as a composer to National Art Theatre. He also became the head of the Central Committee of the Korean Musicians Union in 1954, and would later become the vice-president and president of the Union. He was the president of the Pyongyang University of Music and Dance since 1960. In 1985, he became the general director of the Sea of Blood Opera Troupe. He was the North Korean chairman of the Reunification Music Festival in September 1990. He was also the chairman of the National Music Committee of Korea and honorary member of the International Music Council. Besides his musical activities, he was a deputy to the ninth and tenth Supreme People's Assemblies (SPA). Upon his death in 2002, he held the posts of deputy to the SPA and adviser to the Central Committee of the Korean Musicians Union.

He received many prizes and honors, including Labour Hero, Merited Artist, People's Artist, recipient of the Order of Kim Il Sung and a Kim Il Sung Prize winner. The Pyongyang Conservatory was renamed the Kim Won-gyun Conservatory on 27 June 2006.

Kim Won-gyun died on 5 April 2002 of heart failure. Kim Jong Il sent a wreath to his bier on the day following his death. Kim Jong Un paid homage to Kim Won-gyun by organizing a concert on the centenary of his birth in 2017.

== See also ==
- Music of North Korea
- List of North Korean musicians
