= Song of General Kim Il Sung =

North Korean patriotic song

- Sheet music cover

Song
- Language: Korean
- Written: 1946
- Genre: March
- Length: 2 minutes (Original)
- Composer: Kim Won-gyun
- Lyricist: Ri Chan

Audio sample
- file; help

- Song of General Kim Il Sung
- Chosŏn'gŭl: 김일성 장군의 노래
- Hancha: 金日成 將軍의 노래
- Revised Romanization: Gim Ilseong Janggun ui Norae
- McCune–Reischauer: Kim Ilsŏng Changgun ŭi Norae

External videos
- Song of General Kim Il Sung performed by the State Merited Chorus in 2017
- 김일성장군의 노래

The "Song of General Kim Il Sung" (Korean: 김일성 장군의 노래) is a North Korean marching song composed by Kim Won-gyun in 1946. As a part of an ongoing cult of personality centered around the country's posthumous leaders, the song praising Kim Il Sung, North Korea's "Eternal President", who died in 1994, is still widely played in the country. It is often considered to be the de facto national anthem in North Korea.

The song is a four-square march. It features paired two bar phrases in an A-B-A form, with dotted rhythms. Percussion and brass instrumentation is intended to enhance the revolutionary tone of the song.

The song, composed in 1946, is the earliest known work of art mentioning Kim Il Sung, and thus can be said to mark the beginning of his personality cult.

In the early 1980s Kim Jong Il began promoting the song and it has since replaced "Aegukka", the national anthem, as the most important song and the de facto anthem played in public gatherings in the country. North Koreans typically know the lyrics by heart, though this seems to have changed under his grandson, Kim Jong Un.

The song featured in the 1949 film My Home Village

The song featured in the 1951 film Boy Partisans

The first two bars of the song are used as an interval signal on North Korean radio and television. According to North Korean sources, their satellites Kwangmyŏngsŏng-1, launched in 1998, and Kwangmyŏngsŏng-2, supposedly launched in a test on 5 April 2009, are broadcasting this song among other data.

Emulating a Buddhist tradition of carving sutras, its lyrics are carved in stones as well as the Pyongyang Arch of Triumph.

The song is played by the North Korean state television and Voice of Korea at the start of broadcasts each day.

The third verse of the song was modified around 2025, with the phrase "everywhere over North Korea" (북조선 방방곡곡) replaced by "everywhere over our homeland" (내 조국 방방곡곡).

== Lyrics ==
Chosŏn'gŭl	McCune-Reischauer Romanization	Revised Romanization	English
장백산 줄기줄기 피어린 자욱 압록강 굽이굽이 피어린 자욱 오늘도 자유조선 꽃다발 우에 력력히 비쳐주는 거룩한 자욱 아-, 그 이름도 그리운 우리의 장군 아-, 그 이름도 빛나는 김일성 장군 만주벌 눈바람아 이야기하라 밀림의 긴긴 밤아 이야기하라 만고의 빨찌산이 누구인가를 절세의 애국자가 누구인가를 아-, 그 이름도 그리운 우리의 장군 아-, 그 이름도 빛나는 김일성 장군 로동자 대중에겐 해방의 은인 민주의 새 조선엔 위대한 태양 이십개 정강우에 모두다 뭉쳐 내 조국 방방곡곡 새봄이 온다 아-, 그 이름도 그리운 우리의 장군 아-, 그 이름도 빛나는 김일성 장군	Changbaeksan chulgijulgi p'iŏrin chauk Amnokkang kubigubi p'iŏrin chauk onŭldo chayu Chosŏn kkottabal ue ryŏngnyŏkhi pich'yŏjunŭn kŏrukhan chauk a- kŭ irŭmdo kŭriun uriŭi changgun a- kŭ irŭmdo pinnanŭn Kim Il-sŏng changgun Manjubŏl nunbarama iyagihara millimŭi kin'gin pama iyagihara man'goŭi ppaltchisani nuguingarŭl chŏlseŭi aegukchaga nuguingarŭl a- kŭ irŭmdo kŭriun uriŭi changgun a- kŭ irŭmdo pinnanŭn Kim Il-sŏng changgun rodongja taejungegen haebangŭi ŭnin minjuŭi sae Chosŏn en widaehan t'aeyang isipkae chŏnggangue moduda mungch'yŏ nae jogug pangbanggokkok saebomi oda a- kŭ irŭmdo kŭriun uriŭi changgun a- kŭ irŭmdo pinnanŭn Kim Il-sŏng changgun	Jangbaeksan julgijulgi pieorin jauk Amnokgang gubigubi pieorin jauk Oneuldo jayu Joseon kkotdabarue Ryeongnyeokhi bichyeojuneun georukhan jauk A–, geu ireumdo geuriun uriui janggun A–, geu ireumdo binnaneun gim il-seong janggun Manjubeol nunbarama iyagihara Millimui gin-gin bama iyagihara Man-goui ppaljjisani nugu-in-gareul Jeolse-ui aegukjaga nugu-in-gareul A–, geu ireumdo geuriun uriui janggun A–, geu ireumdo binnaneun gim il-seong janggun Rodongja daejung-egen haebang-ui eunin Minjuui sae Joseon en widaehan taeyang Isipgae jeonggang-ue moduda mungchyeo Nae jogug bangbanggokgok saebomi oda A–, geu ireumdo geuriun uriui janggun A–, geu ireumdo binnaneun gim il-seong janggun	Bright traces of blood on the crags of Jangbaek still gleam, Still the Amnok carries along signs of blood in its stream. Still do those hallowed traces shine resplendently Over Korea ever flourishing and free. So dear to all our hearts is our General's glorious name, Our own beloved Kim Il Sung of undying fame. Tell, blizzards that rage in the wild Manchurian plains, Tell, you nights in forests deep where the silence reigns, Who is the partisan whose deeds are unsurpassed? Who is the patriot whose fame shall ever last? So dear to all our hearts is our General's glorious name, Our own beloved Kim Il Sung of undying fame. He severed the chains of the masses, brought them liberty, The sun of Korea today, democratic and free. For the Twenty Points united we stand fast, Over our fair fatherland spring has come at last! So dear to all our hearts is our General's glorious name, Our own beloved Kim Il Sung of undying fame.

== See also ==
- "Song of General Kim Jong Il"
- "Aegukga" – National anthem of South Korea
- "Aegukka" – National anthem of North Korea
