= Song of General Kim Jong Il =

1997 marching song from North Korea

- Chosŏn'gŭl: 김정일장군의 노래
- Hancha: 金正日將軍의 노래
- Revised Romanization: Gim Jeong-il Janggun ui Norae
- McCune–Reischauer: Kim Chŏng-il Changgun ŭi Norae

Song of General Kim Jong Il
Instrumental sample

The "Song of General Kim Jong Il" (Korean: 김정일장군의 노래 Kimjongil janggunui nolae) is a marching song from North Korea. It was composed by Sol Myong-sun (설명순, 1936–2012) and the words were written by Sin Un-ho (신운호, 1941 – 24 March 2020) in 1997.

The song praises the "Eternal General Secretary", Kim Jong Il (who ruled from 1994 until 2011) as a part of his cult of personality. During the presidency of Kim Il Sung, Kim Jong Il helped to run his father's own personality cult. Although the "Song of General Kim Jong Il" is not as widely popular as the "Song of General Kim Il Sung" (nor was his cult as large as his father's), it is also played regularly in North Korea.

The song is played by the North Korean state television at the start of broadcasts each day. It was also played after the telecast of Kim Jong Il's memorial service on 29 December 2011. Pyongyang FM Broadcasting also plays a chime version of the first two lines of the song as its interval signal at the start of broadcasts.

According to North Korean sources, their satellite Kwangmyŏngsŏng-2, supposedly launched in a test on 5 April 2009, is broadcasting this song amongst other data.

An English version has been recorded by Ritta Dimek.

The first verse of the song was modified in 2025, with the phrase "Three thousand miles of beautiful scenery" (금수강산 삼천리) replaced by "Concluded by beautiful scenery" (금수강산 끝까지).

== See also ==
- "Song of General Kim Il Sung"
- Music of North Korea
- Propaganda in North Korea
