= Turu Island =

Island in North Korea

Coordinates: 38.992°N 125.688°E

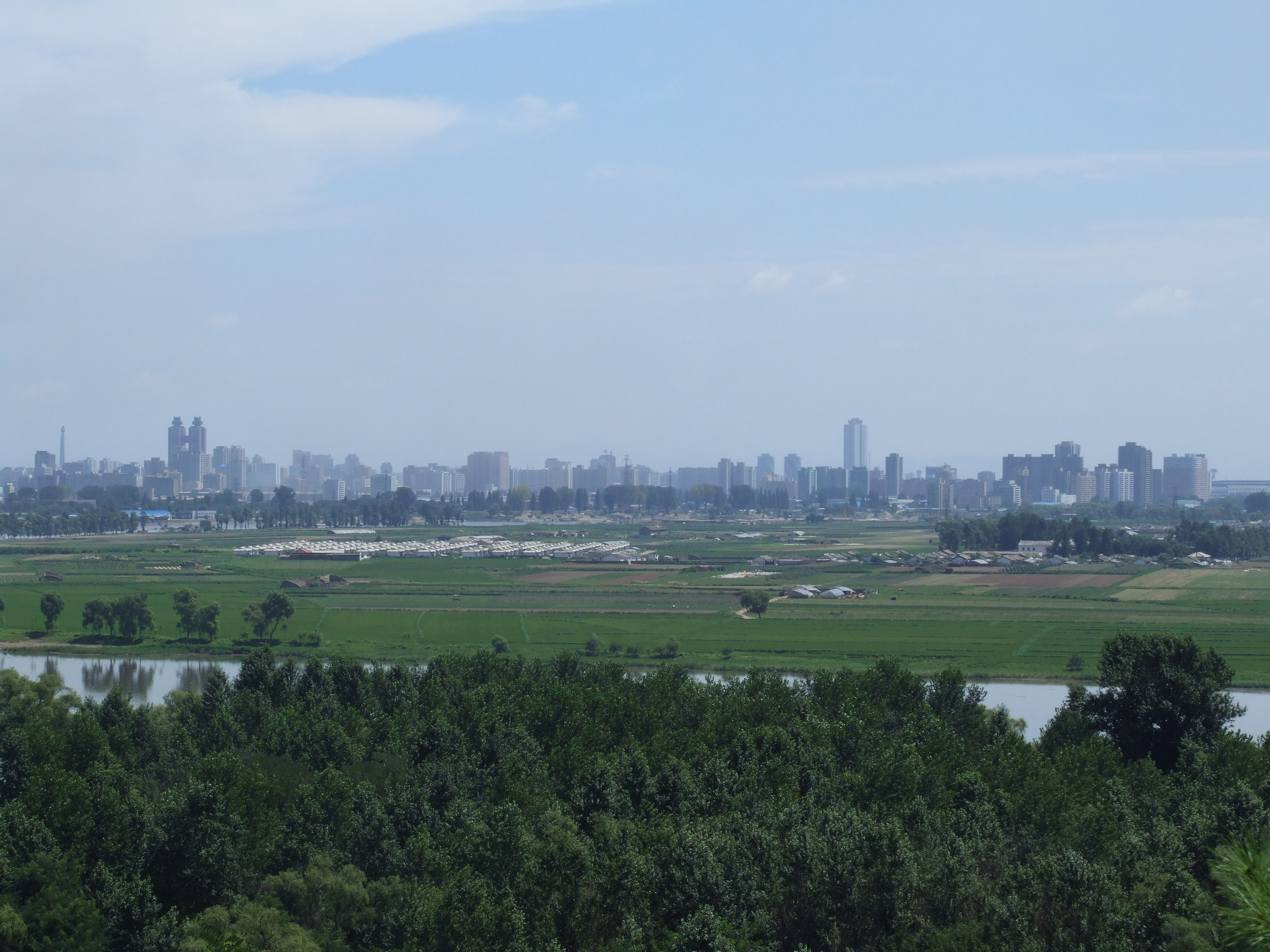
View southwards from Mangyong Hill overlooking greenhouses on Turu Island with buildings including the twin-towered Koryo Hotel visible on the southern bank

Turu Island (두루섬) is a large island in the Taedong River in Pyongyang, North Korea, separated by a shallow channel from the smaller Ssuk Island to its east. Since 1983 both islands have been accessible by road via an off-ramp in the middle of the Chungsong Bridge. The island was the site of the General Sherman incident, the destruction of an armed U.S. Merchant Marine side-wheel steamer in 1866.
