= Revolutionary Site =

Designated historical sites in North Korea

- Chosŏn'gŭl: 혁명사적지
- Hancha: 革命史蹟地
- Revised Romanization: Hyeongmyeong-sajeokji
- McCune–Reischauer: Hyŏngmyŏng-sajŏkchi

Revolutionary Battle Site
- Chosŏn'gŭl: 혁명전적지
- Hancha: 革命戰跡地
- Revised Romanization: Hyeongmyeong-jeonjeokji
- McCune–Reischauer: Hyŏngmyŏng-jŏnjŏkchi

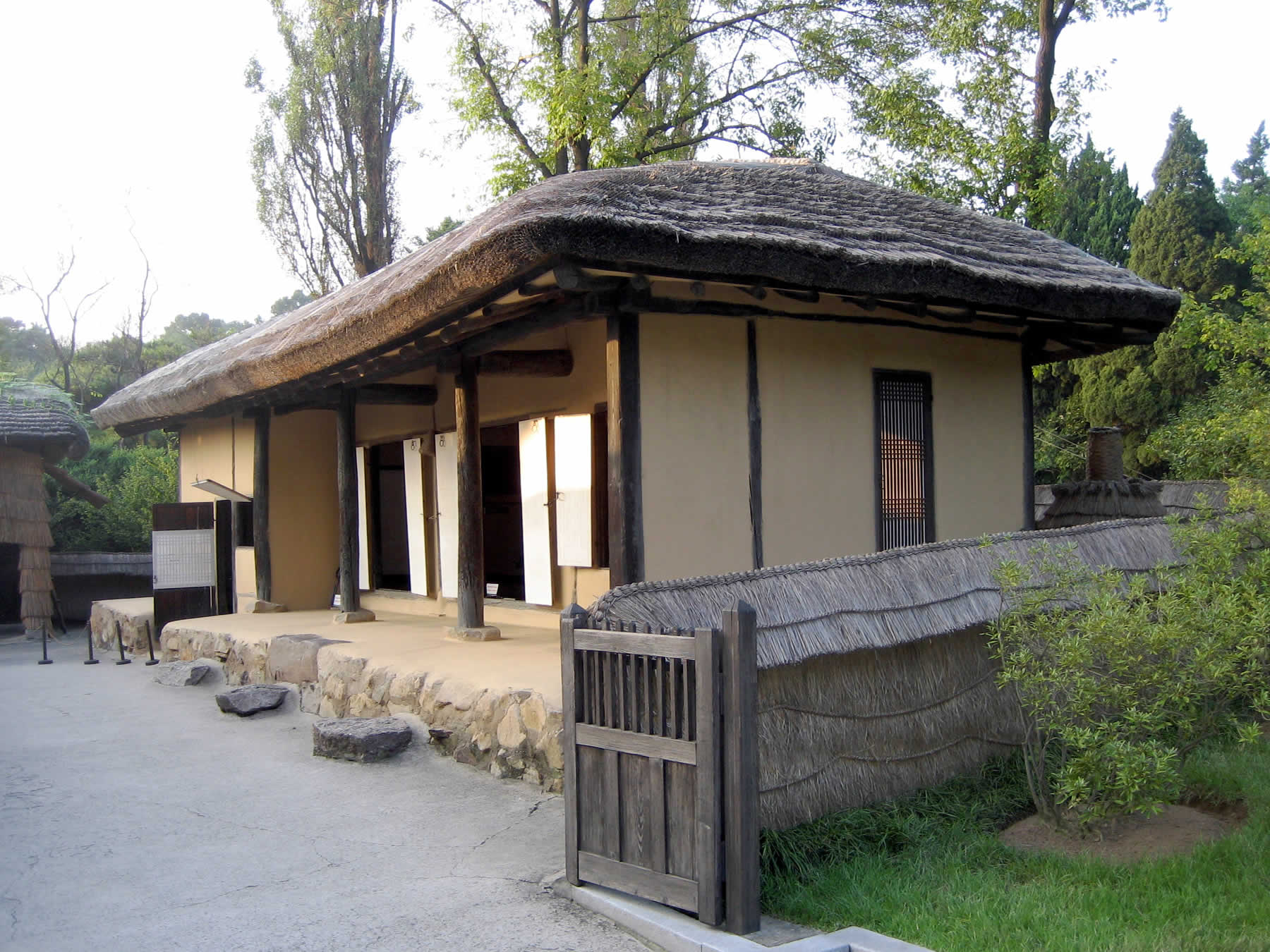
Mangyongdae Revolutionary Site

Revolutionary Sites (Korean: 혁명사적지) are designated historical sites in North Korea. The sites were designated by Kim Jong Il when he began working at the Propaganda and Agitation Department of the Workers' Party of Korea in 1966. He would send troops all over the country to unearth sites that "were supposedly once forgotten and undiscovered". By converting North Korea into a "huge open museum", Kim's goal in designating the sites was to solidify the North Korean cult of personality centered around him and his father Kim Il Sung.

In 1988, there were 27 such sites. Today, there are more than 60. Of them, 40 commemorate Kim Il Sung, 20 Kim Jong Il, and many others Kim Hyong-jik, Kim Jong-suk, Kim Hyong-gwon and other members of the Kim family.

There are two categories of sites, Revolutionary Sites and Revolutionary Battle Sites. Rather than a single building or a point of interest, the sites spawn large areas. Some famous Revolutionary Sites include Mangyongdae, the birthplace of Kim Il Sung, in Pyongyang, and Jangjasan Revolutionary Site and Oun Revolutionary Site associated with the youth of Kim Jong Il. The Mount Paektu area in particular hosts many sites.

South Koreans have criticized the sites for "wip[ing] out traditional culture".

== List ==
=== Revolutionary Sites ===
- Chaho Revolutionary Site
- Changgol Revolutionary Site
- Changsan Revolutionary Site
- Chilgol Revolutionary Site
- Chongam Revolutionary Site
- Chongsu Revolutionary Site
- Chosan Revolutionary Site
- Haktanggol Revolutionary Site
- Hoeryong Revolutionary Site
- Hyangha Revolutionary Site
- Jangjasan Revolutionary Site
- Jangsusan Revolutionary Site
- Jihyesan Revolutionary Site
- Jonsung Revolutionary Site
- Junggang Revolutionary Site
- Kaechon Revolutionary Site
- Kaeson Revolutionary Site
- Kangso County Party Revolutionary Site
- Kochigang Revolutionary Site
- Kosanjin Revolutionary Site
- Kumchon Revolutionary Site
- Kumsugol Revolutionary Site
- Kunja Revolutionary Site
- Kwangjong Revolutionary Site
- Kwanhakgol Revolutionary Site
- Malum Revolutionary Site
- Mangyongdae Revolutionary Site
- Mirim Revolutionary Site
- Munsubong Revolutionary Site
- Naedong Revolutionary Site
- Naesong Revolutionary Site
- Okchon Revolutionary Site
- Oun Revolutionary Site
- Paeksong Revolutionary Site
- Phophyong Revolutionary Site
- Phothae Revolutionary Site
- Phyongchon Revolutionary Site
- Ponghwa Revolutionary Site
- Pothonggang Revolutionary Site
- Pultanggol Revolutionary Site
- Rimyongsu Revolutionary Site
- Ryongaksan Revolutionary Site
- Ryonghyon Revolutionary Site
- Ryongpho Revolutionary Site
- Ryudong Revolutionary Site
- Samdung Revolutionary Site
- Sansong Revolutionary Site
- Sinpha Revolutionary Site
- Sniff Revolutionary Site
- Soksagol Revolutionary Site
- Sonbong Revolutionary Site
- Songhung Revolutionary Site
- Songjon Revolutionary Site
- Ssangunri Revolutionary Site
- Ssuksom Revolutionary Site
- Sungap Revolutionary Site
- Tokgol Revolutionary Site
- Tonghungsan Revolutionary Site
- Wangjaesan Revolutionary Site
- Wonhwa Revolutionary Site
- Wonsan Station Revolutionary Site
- Yombun Revolutionary Site
- Yombunjin Revolutionary Site
- Yuphyong Revolutionary Site

=== Revolutionary Battle Sites ===
- Angup Revolutionary Battle Site
- Insan Revolutionary Battle Site
- Kusi Barrage Revolutionary Battle Site
- Paektusan Revolutionary Battle Sites
- Pochonbo Revolutionary Battle Site
- Pujon Revolutionary Battle Site
- Rangrim Revolutionary Battle Site
- Samjiyon Revolutionary Battle Site
- Sinhung Area Revolutionary Battle Site
- Sinsadong Revolutionary Battle Site
- Taehongdan Revolutionary Battle Site

== See also ==
- History of North Korea
- Korean independence movement
- List of museums in North Korea
- List of tourist attractions in Pyongyang
