= Pyongyang Sci-Tech Complex =

Sci-Tech Complex
- 과학기술전당
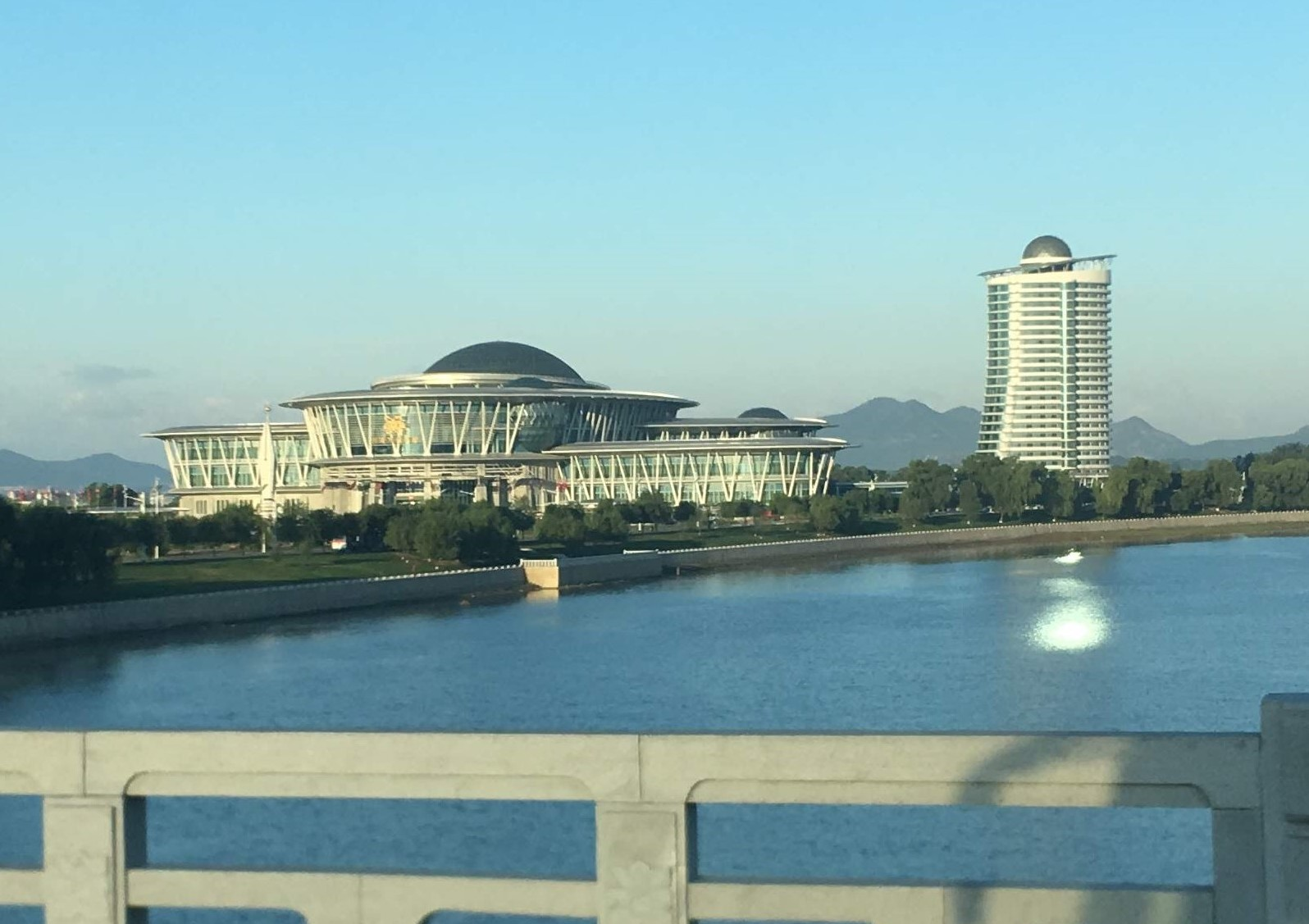
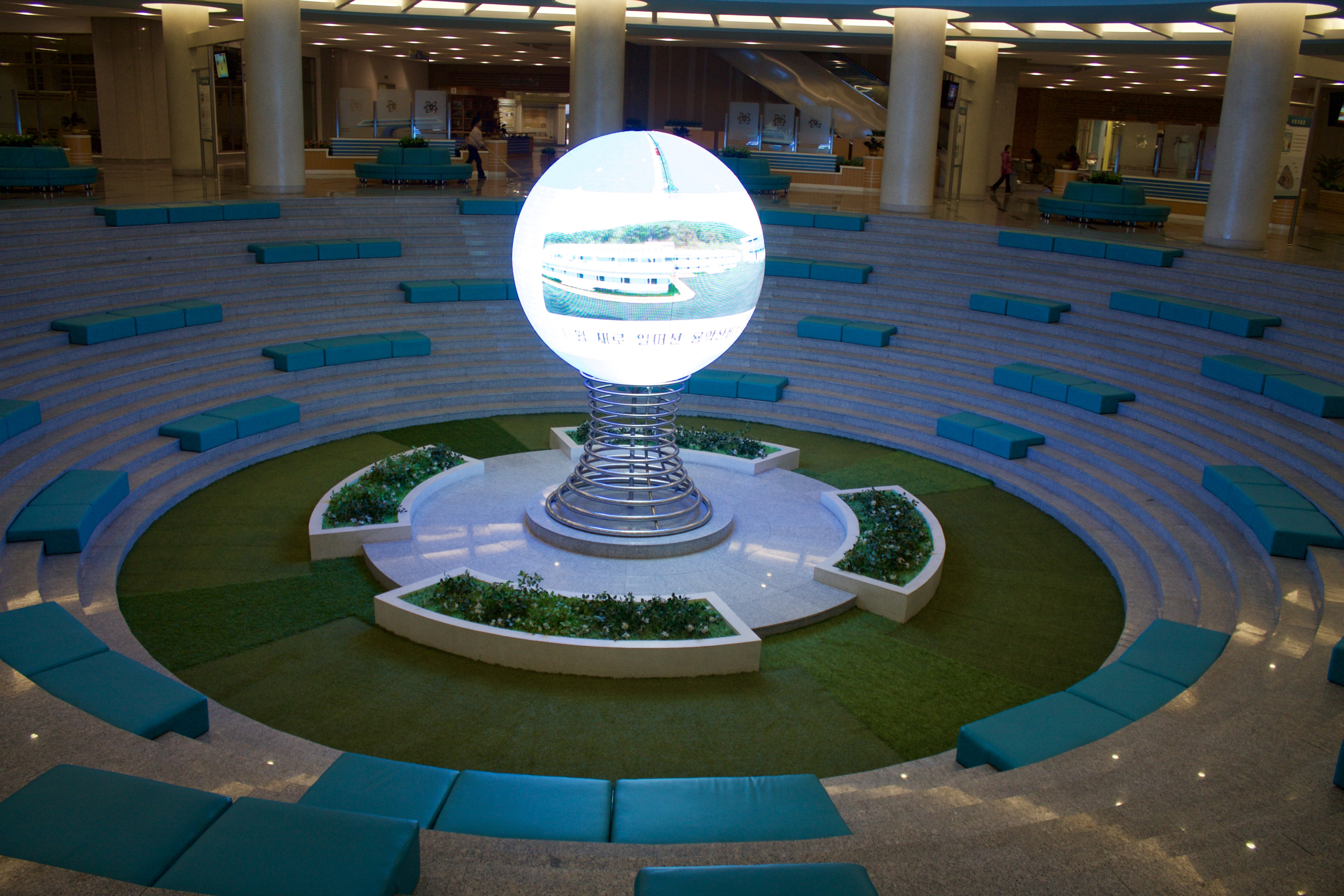
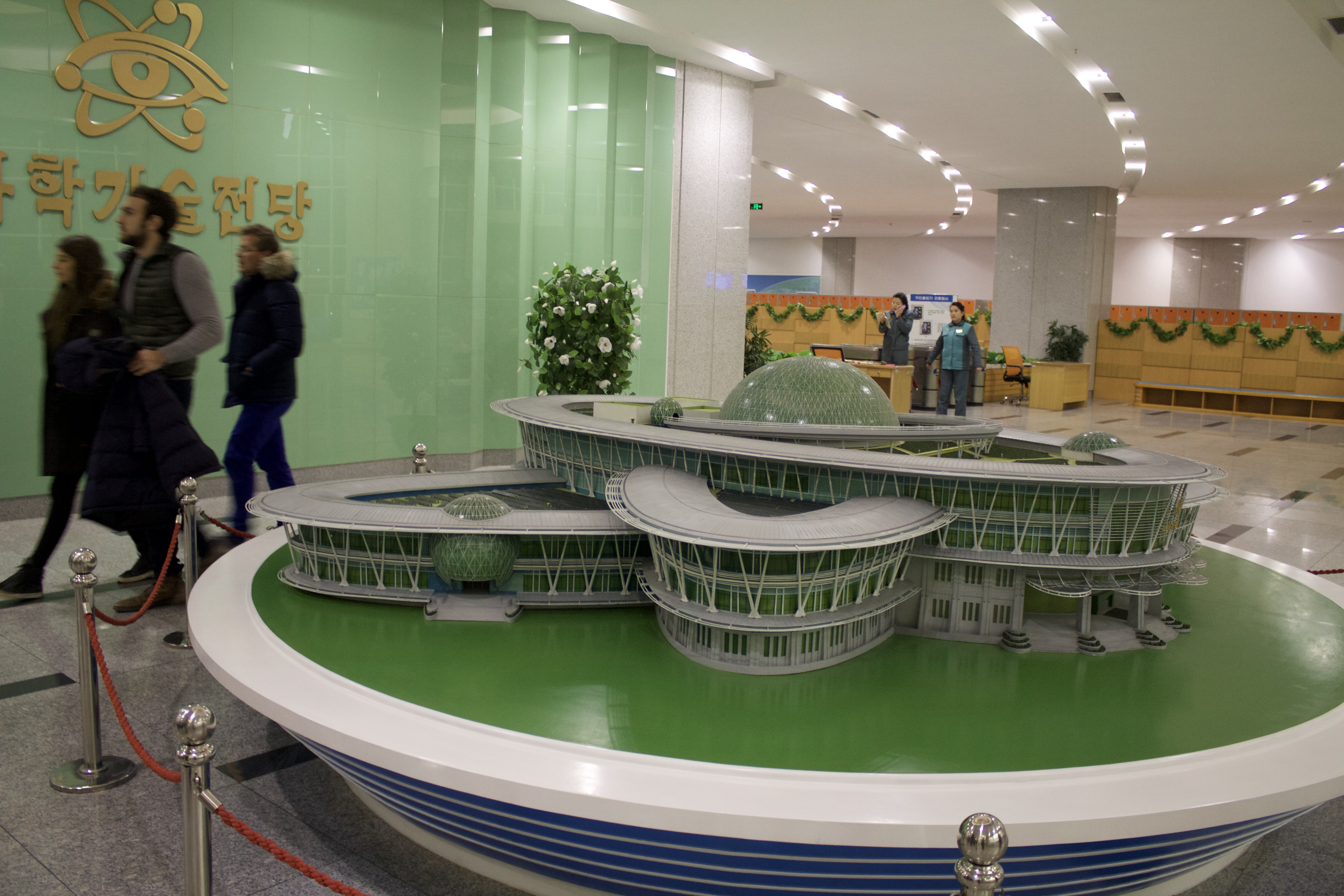
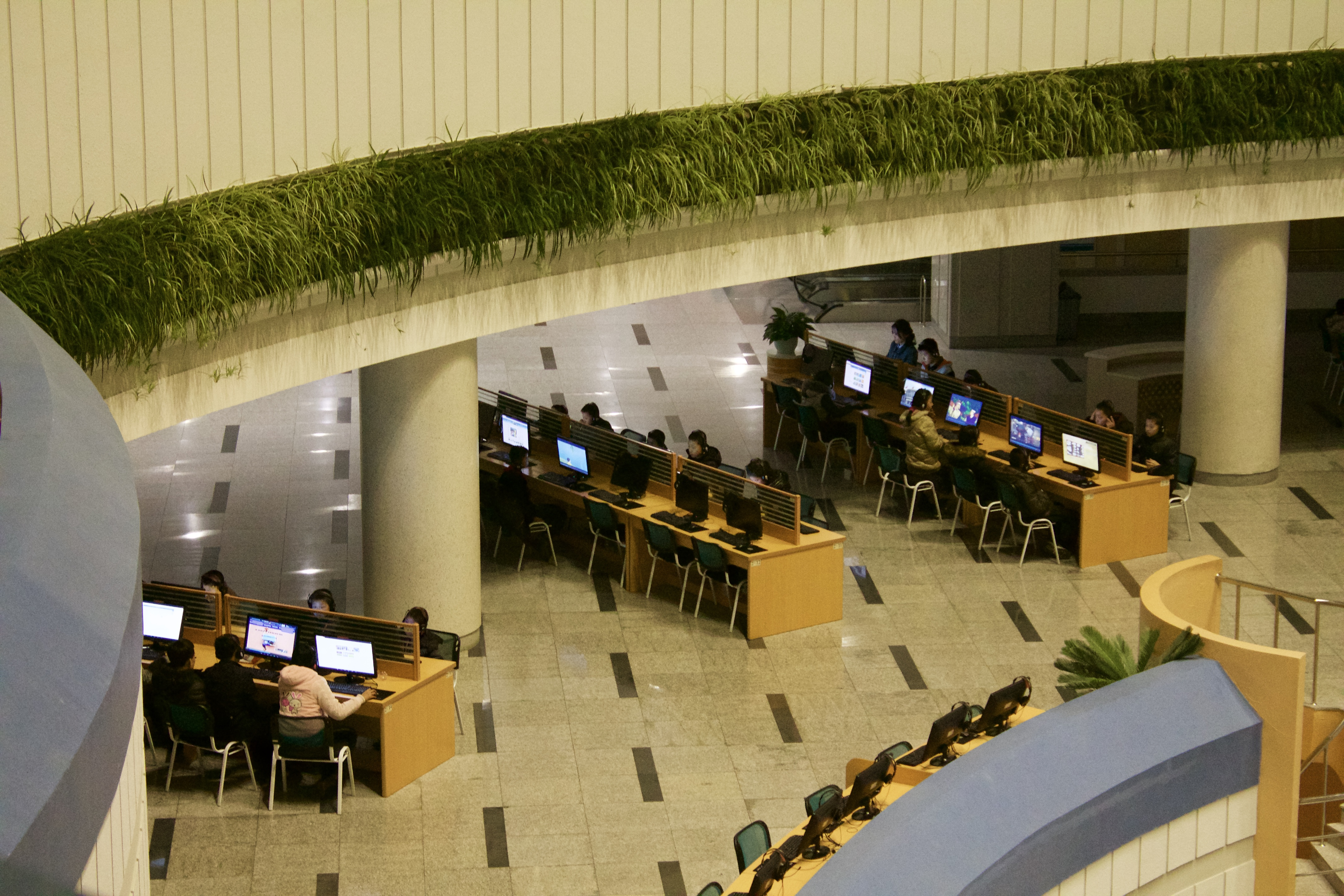
- Interactive map of the Sci-Tech Complex area

General information
- Status: Completed
- Location: Ssuk Island, Rangrang-guyok Pyongyang, North Korea, North Korea
- Coordinates: 38°59′19.68″N 125°42′44.64″E
- Completed: 2015
- Opened: 2015

The DPRK Sci-Tech Complex (Korean: 과학기술전당) is a science and technology centre housed in a large atom-shaped building located on Ssuk Island in Pyongyang, accessed by the Chungsong Bridge. It was completed in 2015. According to KBS World, it then had over 100,000 square meters of floor area.

From above, the facility is built to resemble an atom. The facility has an e-library. It has about 3,000 computer terminals. To North Koreans, these provide access to the national intranet, the Kwangmyong network.

== See also ==
- South Hamgyong Sci-Tech Library
