= Pujon Revolutionary Battle Site =

Historic site in North Korea

The Pujŏn Revolutionary Battle Site (Korean: 부전 혁명전적지) was the location of a battle in which members of the North Korean Kim family, including Kim Il Sung, Kim Jong Il, and Kim Jong Suk, participated in as part of the Korean independence movement. It is located in Pujŏn County.

During the 1930s, the Korean People's Revolutionary Army built secret camps in the northern mountainous areas of Korea. The secret camp on Mount Okryon in the Pujŏn Revolutionary Battle Site was one of such camps.

== See also ==
- Revolutionary Battle Site
