= Ssuksom =

Island in Pyongyang, North Korea

Coordinates: 38°59′20″N 125°42′44″E

Ssuksom (Korean: 쑥섬; lit. mugwort island) is a small island in the Taedong River in Pyongyang, North Korea, separated by a shallow channel from the larger Turu Island to its west. Since 1983 it has been accessible by road via an off-ramp in the middle of the Chungsong Bridge. It is the site of the new Pyongyang Sci-Tech Complex completed in 2015.

Ssuksom is listed as a Revolutionary Site, commemorating a 1948 meeting between North and South Korean organizations.
