= Chungsong Bridge =

Road bridge in Pyongyang, North Korea

Coordinates: 38.9884°N 125.7213°E

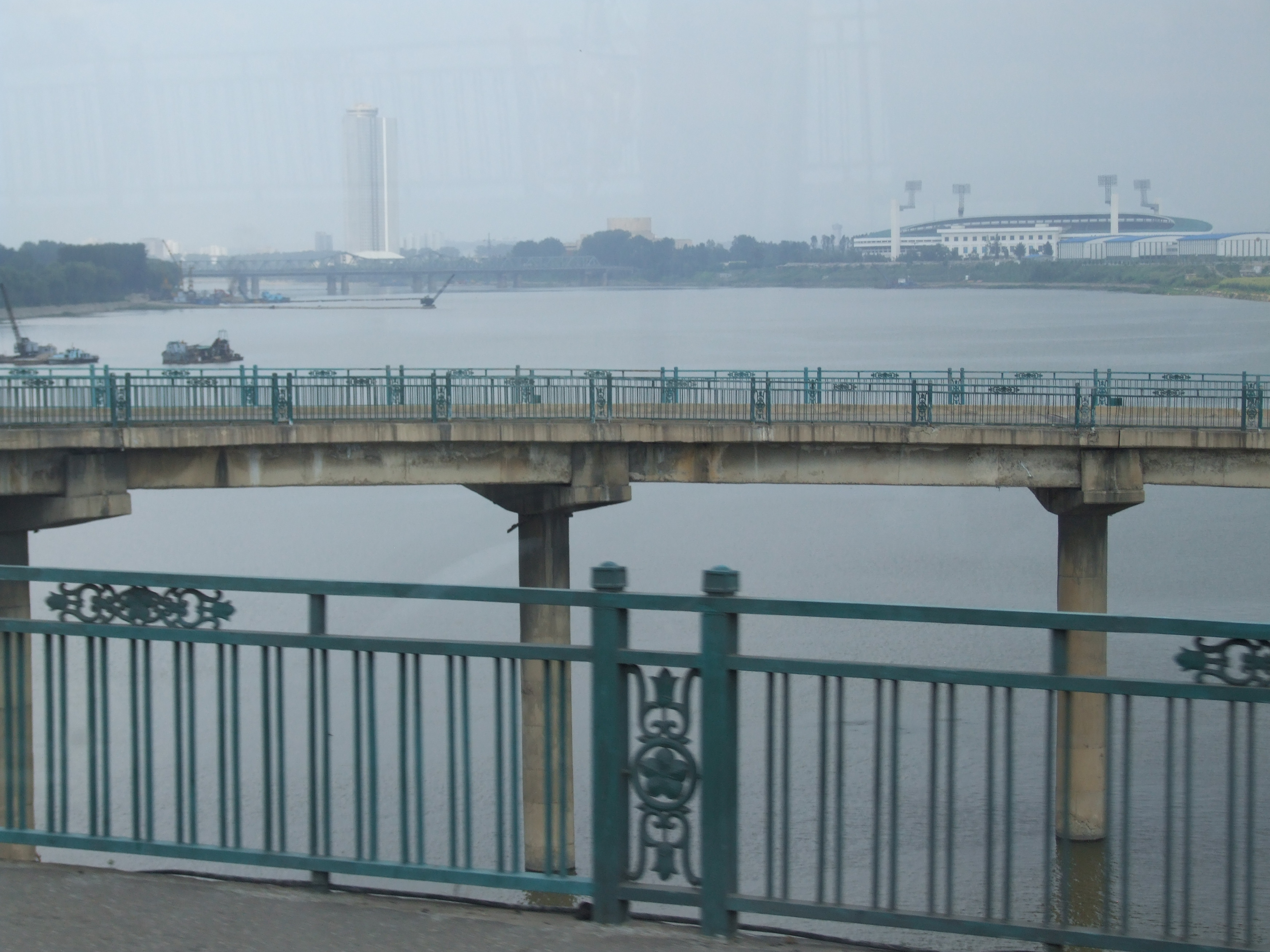
Chungsong Bridge

The Chungsong Bridge (충성의 다리, 忠誠) is the westernmost major road bridge across the Taedong River in Pyongyang. It connects Pyongchon District (Chollima Street) on the northern side to Rangrang District (the Pyongyang-Kaesong Motorway) on the southern side. The bridge was opened to traffic on September 6, 1983.

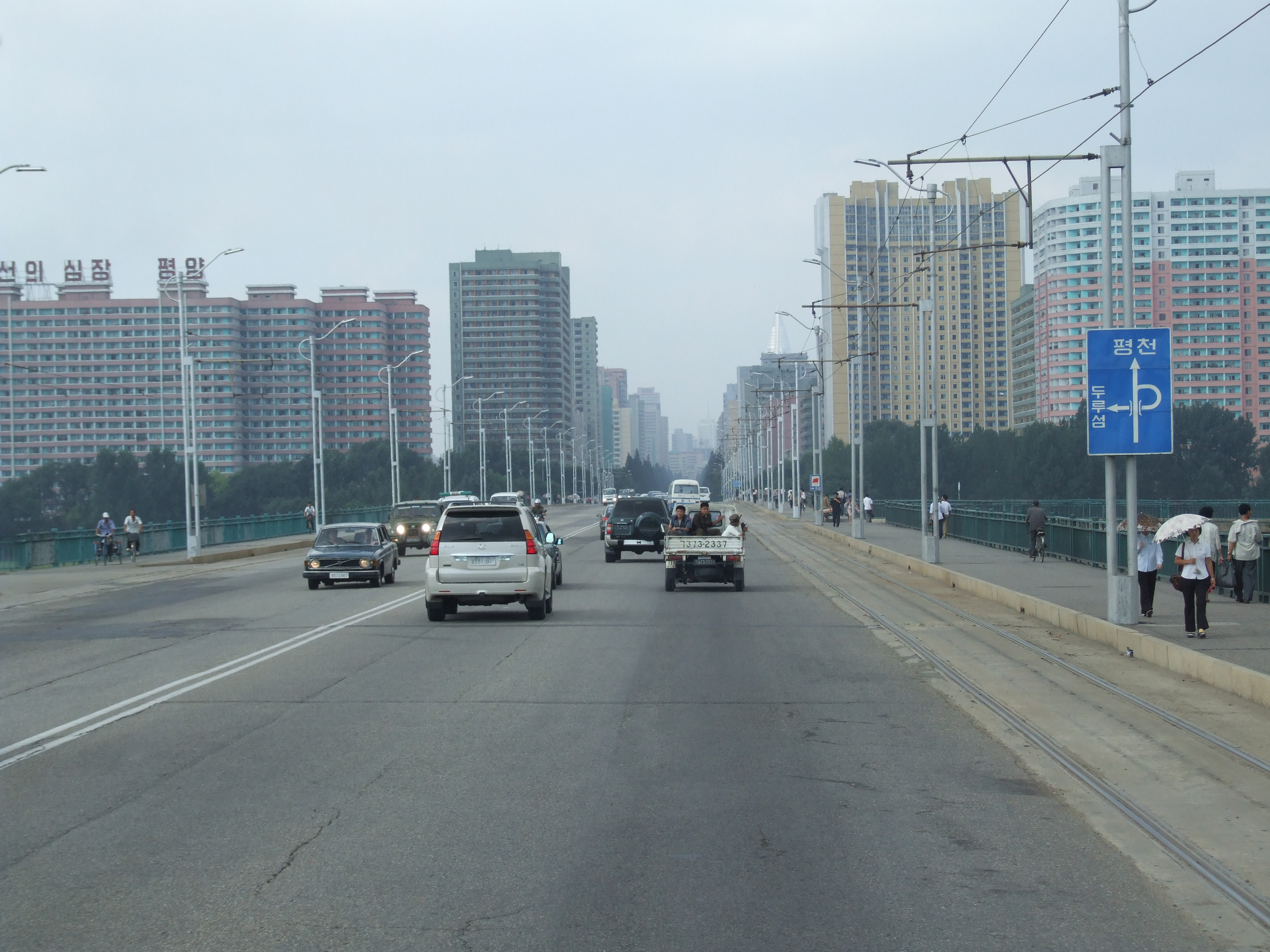
Traffic on Chungsong Bridge

The bridge has two lanes in each direction and a track lane for the tram. There are pedestrian walkways on both sides. In the middle of the bridge, there are on and off-ramps that lead to the small Ssuk Island (쑥섬), where the Pyongyang Sci-Tech Complex is located, which also provide access to the larger and mainly agricultural Turu Island.
