= Changsan Revolutionary Site =

- Interactive map of Changsan Revolutionary Site
- 39°4′23″N 125°45′30″E
- Type: Revolutionary Site
- Location: Ryonmot-dong, Sosong District, Pyongyang

- Changsan Revolutionary Site
- Hangul: 장산혁명사적지
- Hanja: 長山革命史蹟地
- RR: Jangsan hyeongmyeong sajeokji
- MR: Changsan hyŏngmyŏng sajŏkchi

Changsan Revolutionary Site (Jangsan Revolutionary Site) is a Revolutionary Site in Ryonmot-dong, Sosong District in Pyongyang.

It commemorates Kim Jong Il partaking in an effort to plant trees on Changsan with students of the Pyongyang Middle School No. 1 in 1957. He also helped in constructing the Wasan-dong–Ryongsong Road there in May–June 1961 when he was still a student at Kim Il Sung University. Kim Jong Il's activities at the site to "carry out the far-reaching plans of the great leader President Kim Il-song for the construction of the capital and building of Armed Forces" continued into 1962. Kim also guided military exercises of students of the Pyongyang Namsan Senior Middle School and Kim Il Sung University there many times. Taking part in these efforts were some of the first signs of Kim Jong Il rising in political profile thus readying to succeed his father Kim Il Sung as the leader of North Korea.

The Revolutionary Site was opened in 1977, on the occasion of Kim Jong Il's birthday on 16 February. There are many historic buildings at the site, including a general introduction hall, a revolutionary monument, the site of study, the site of shooting exercise, and the site of the tree planting. According to North Korean sources, the site has been visited by at least 6.87 million people as of 2011. It is one of many Revolutionary Sites in the country commemorating activities of members of the Kim family.
