= Pochon-up =

Town in North Korea

- Hangul: 보천읍
- Hanja: 普天邑
- RR: Bocheon-eup
- MR: Poch'ŏn-ŭp

Pochŏn-ŭp is a town located in Pochon County, Ryanggang Province, North Korea. The Battle of Poch'ŏnbo took place there in June, 1937, during the Japanese occupation.

The Pochonbo Museum of the Revolution, related to the battle, is located in Pochon.

Pochon-up is designated as a Revolutionary Battle Site that also includes the Kusi Barrage Revolutionary Battle Site and the battle site of Konjang Hill.

The battle site also inspired the name of the Pochonbo Electronic Ensemble, a North Korean orchestra.
