= Samji Lake =

Lake in North Korea

Coordinates: 41°49′49″N 128°20′01″E

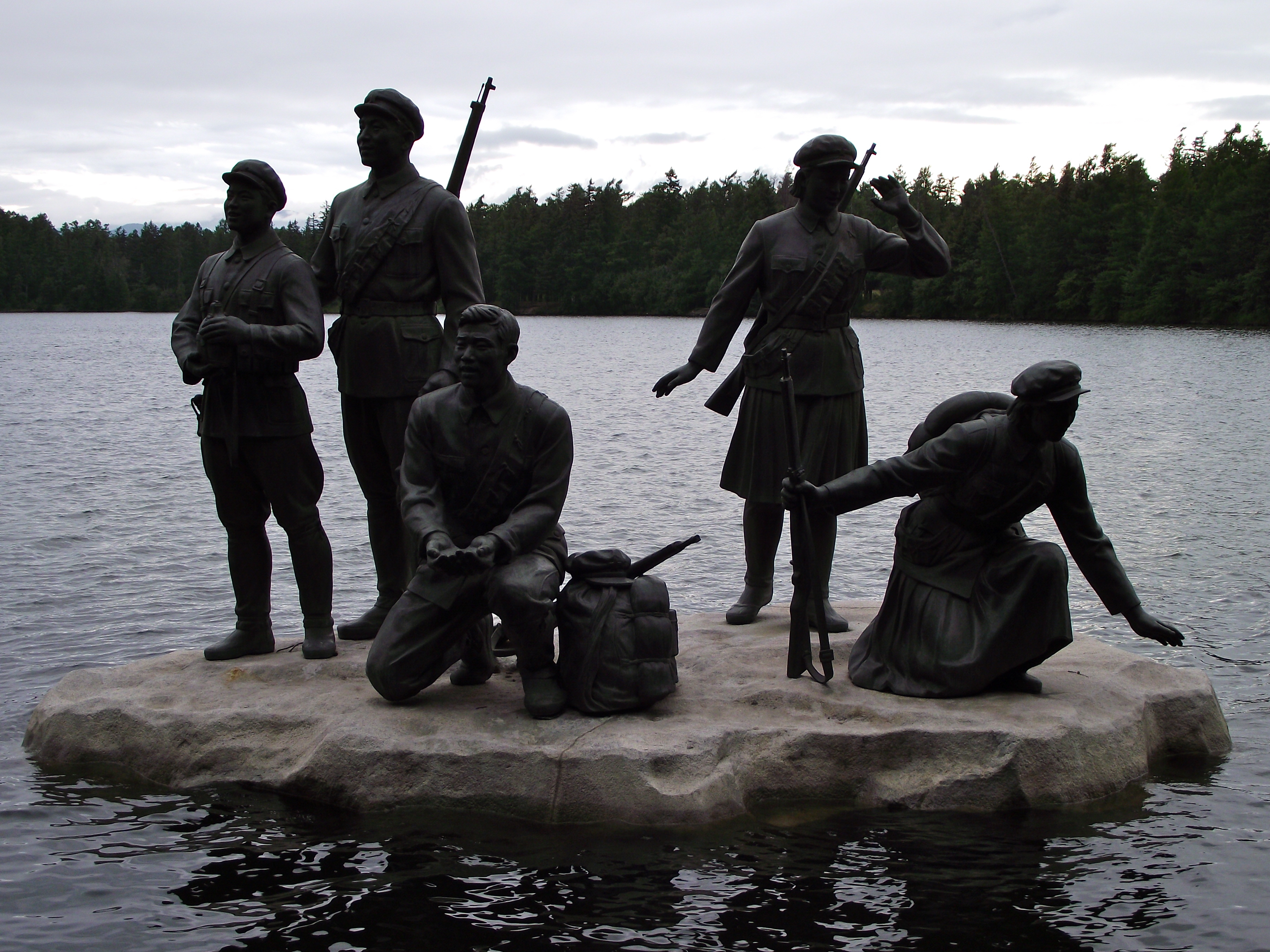

Korean name
- Hangul: 삼지연
- Hanja: 三池淵
- RR: Samjiyeon
- MR: Samjiyŏn

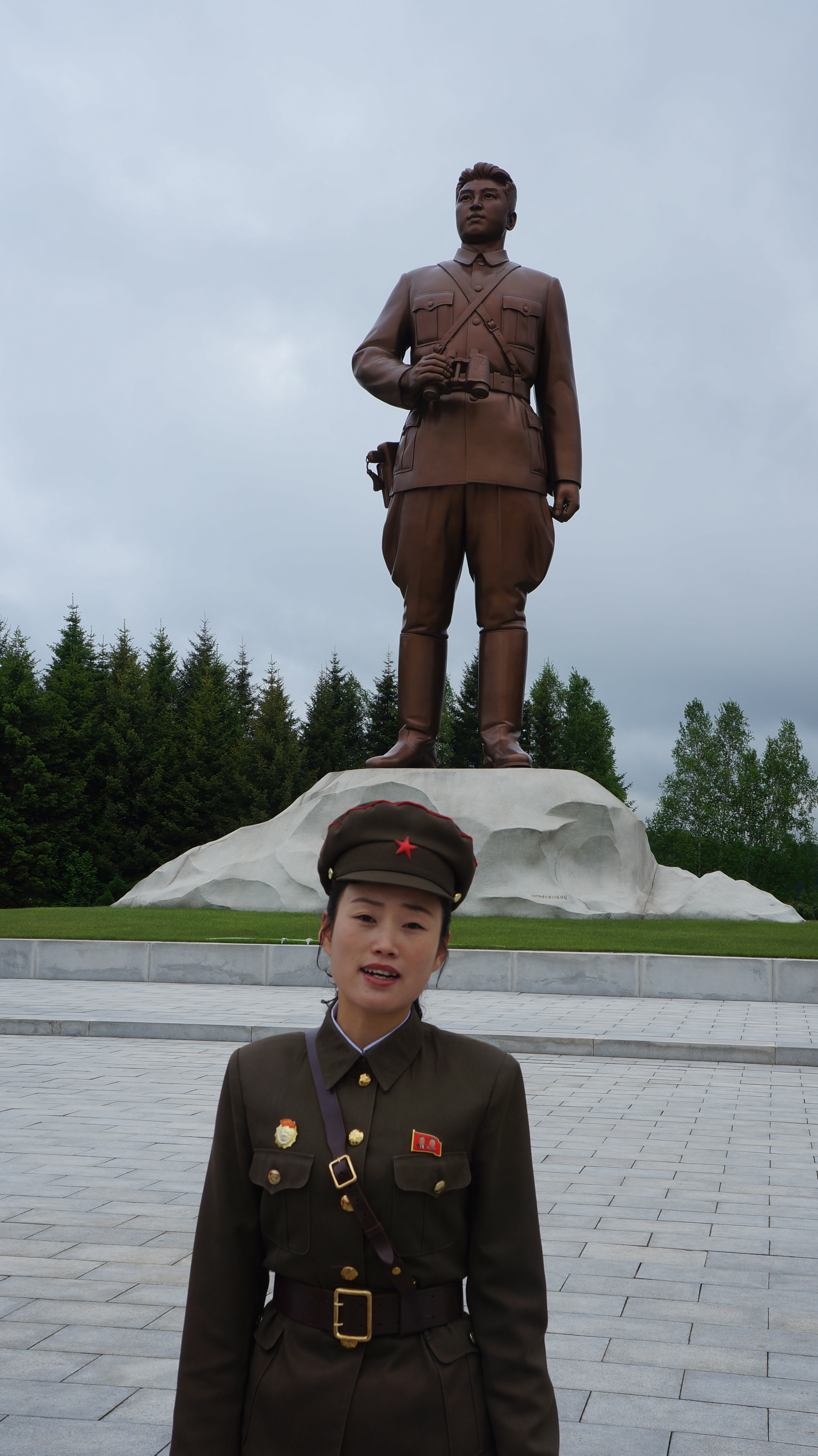
Grand Monument of Lake Samji

Samji (Korean: 삼지) is a lake in North Korea. The lake serves as a tourist attraction.

== Etymology ==
The word samji means "three pools" in Korean language. The lake is formed by three ponds which are located side by side.

== History ==
Between 1937 and 1939, the Japanese built the 120-km-long Hyesan-Musan Guard Road one hundred meters from the lake.

The lake is near the location of the Battle of Musan fought in May 1939. The battle is considered important in history of the Korean Revolution.

Samji Lake is designated as a Revolutionary Battle Site. The Grand Monument of Lake Samji there is built in honor of Kim Il Sung.

== See also ==
- Heaven Lake
- Natural monuments of North Korea
- Samjiyon Band
- Samjiyon County
