= Mangyongdae =

Neighborhood in Pyongyang, North Korea

- Neighborhood
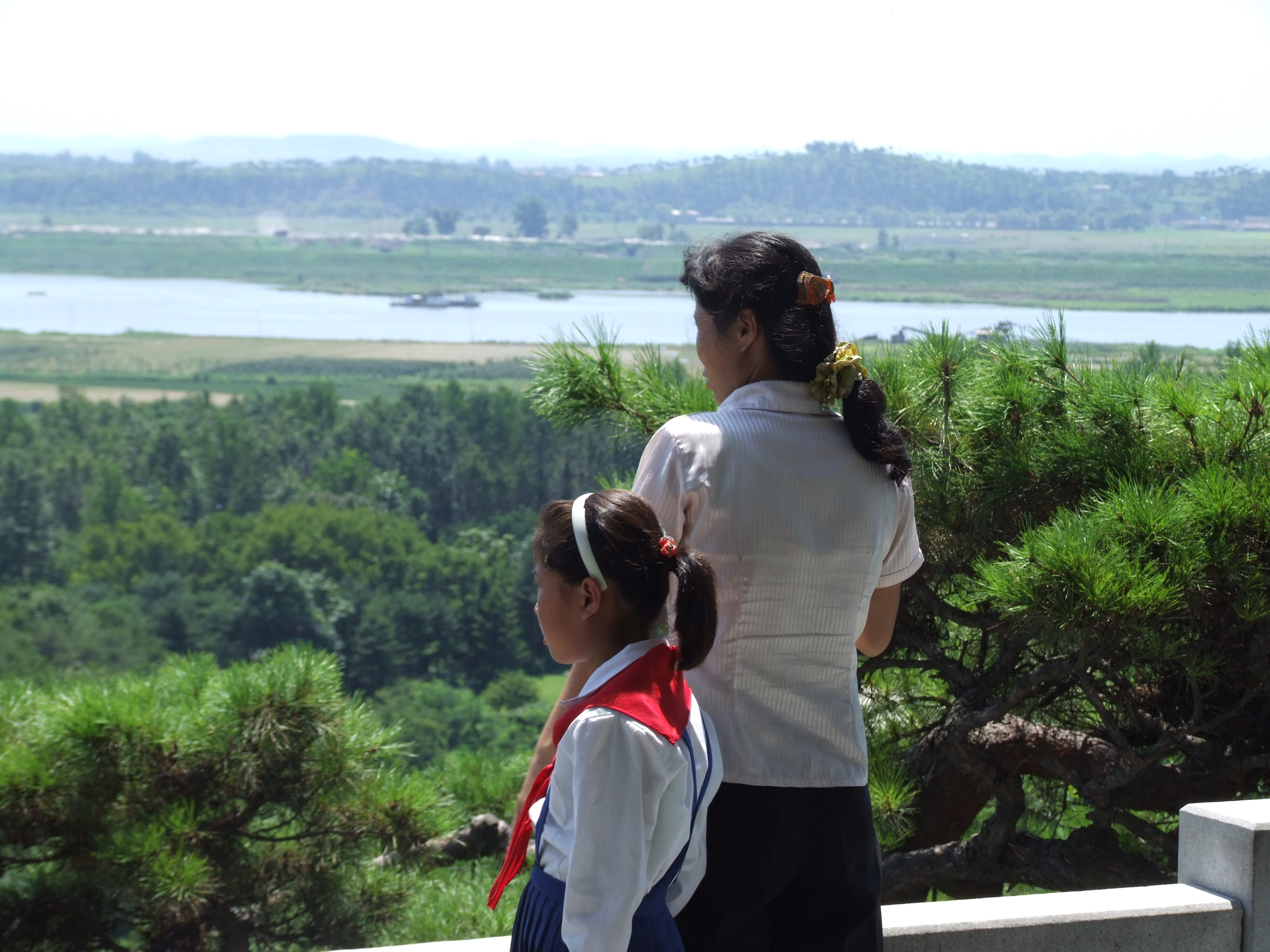

- Location within Pyongyang
- Coordinates: 38.9911°N 125.6600°E
- Country: North Korea
- City: Pyongyang
- District: Mangyongdae-guyok

Korean name
- Hangul: 만경대
- Hanja: 萬景臺
- RR: Mangyeongdae
- MR: Man'gyŏngdae

Mangyongdae (Korean: 만경대) is a neighborhood in Mangyongdae-guyok, Pyongyang, North Korea. North Korean propaganda claims that Mangyongdae is the birthplace of North Korean leader Kim Il Sung, although in his memoirs he wrote that he had been born in the nearby neighborhood of Chilgol. Mangyongdae is where his father Kim Hyong-jik was from, and where Kim Il Sung spent his childhood.

Mangyongdae has been designated as a historic site since 1947, and is listed as a Revolutionary Site. Original structures at the site have been replaced with replicas.

Mangyongdae has since been incorporated to the city of Pyongyang. The Football at the Mangyongdae Prize Sports Games and Mangyongdae Prize International Marathon are both named after the area.

== Gallery ==
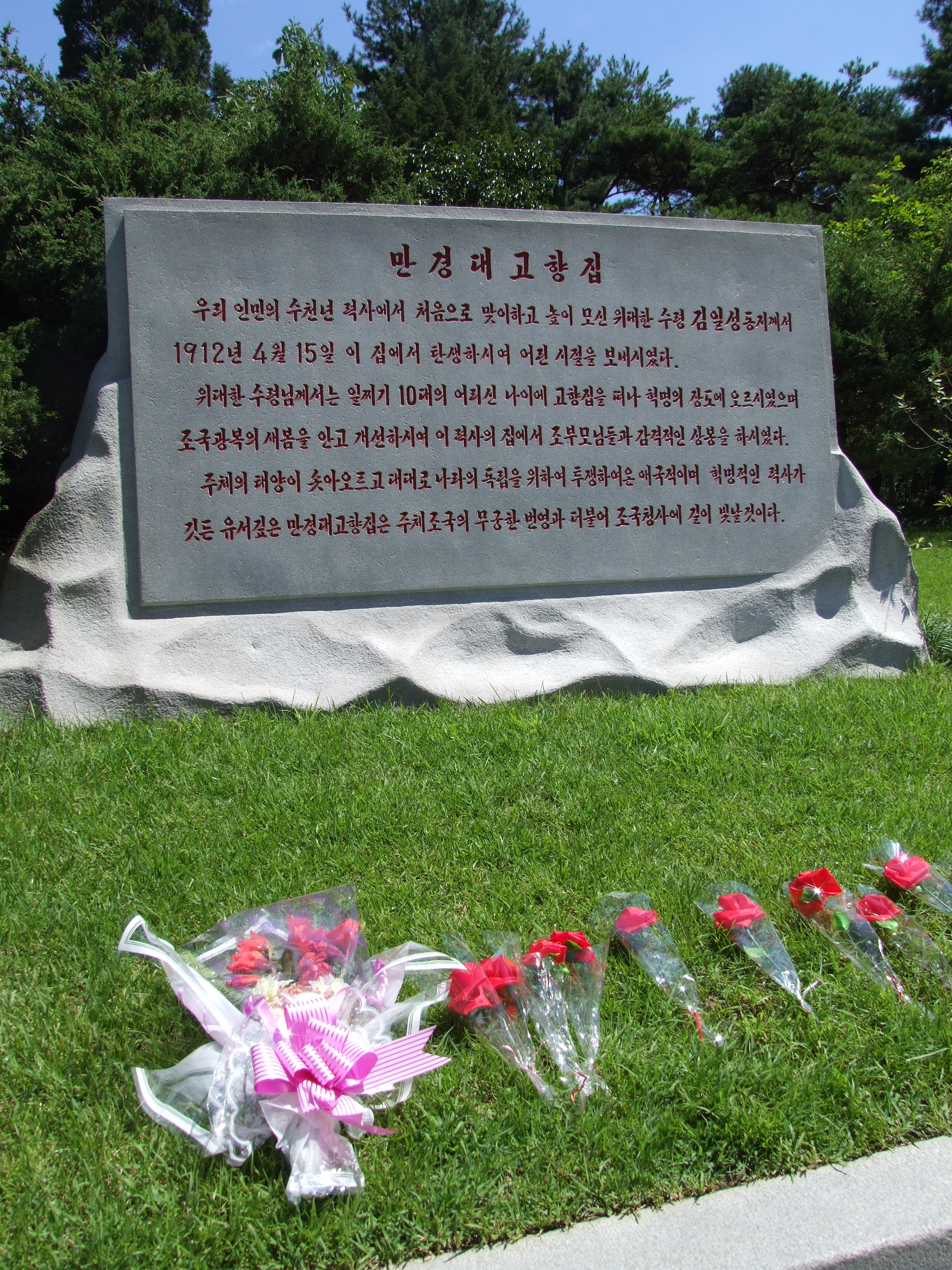
Sign about Kim's birthplace with flowers in front of it (2012)

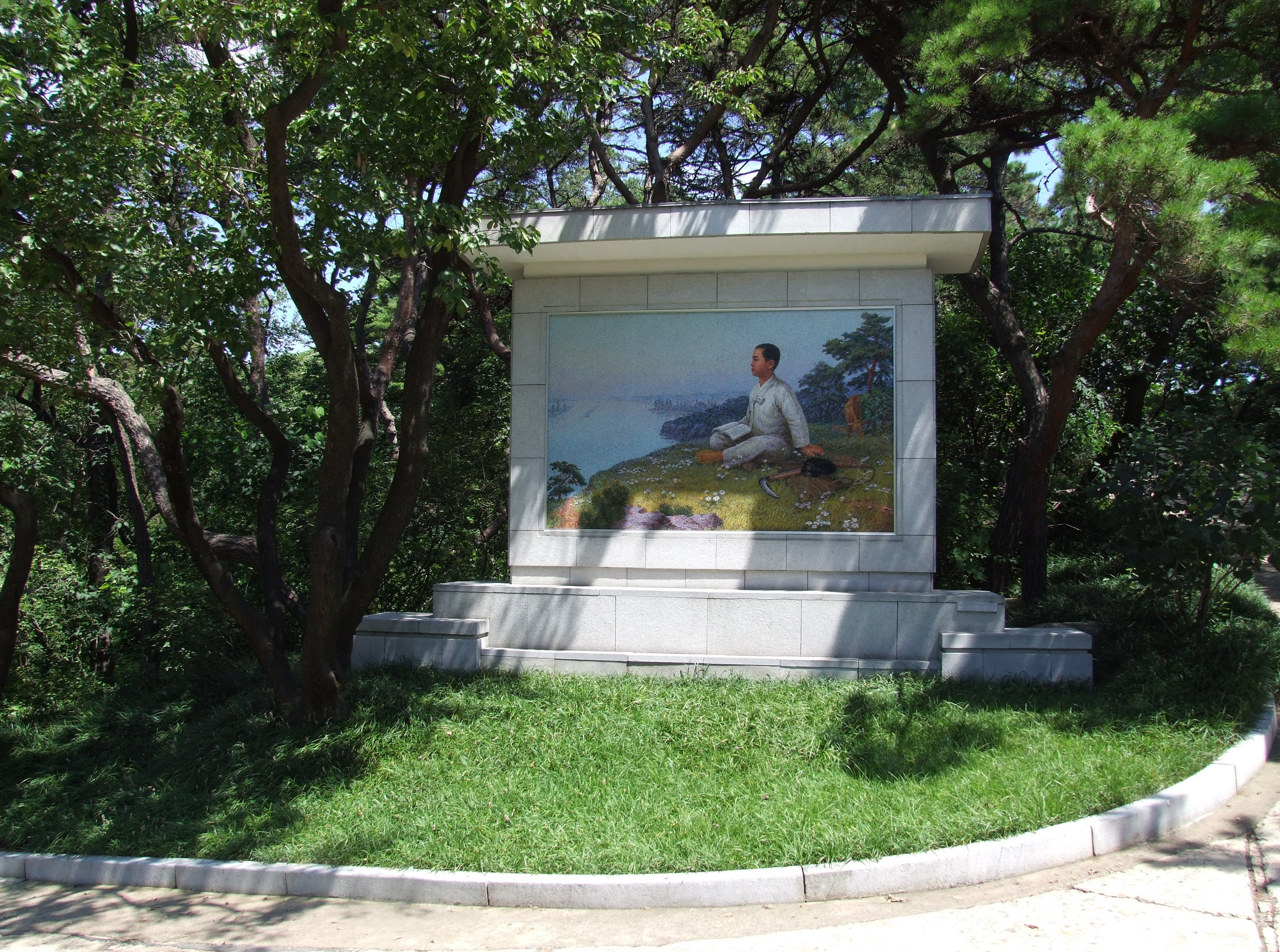
Mural near Kim's birthplace (2012)

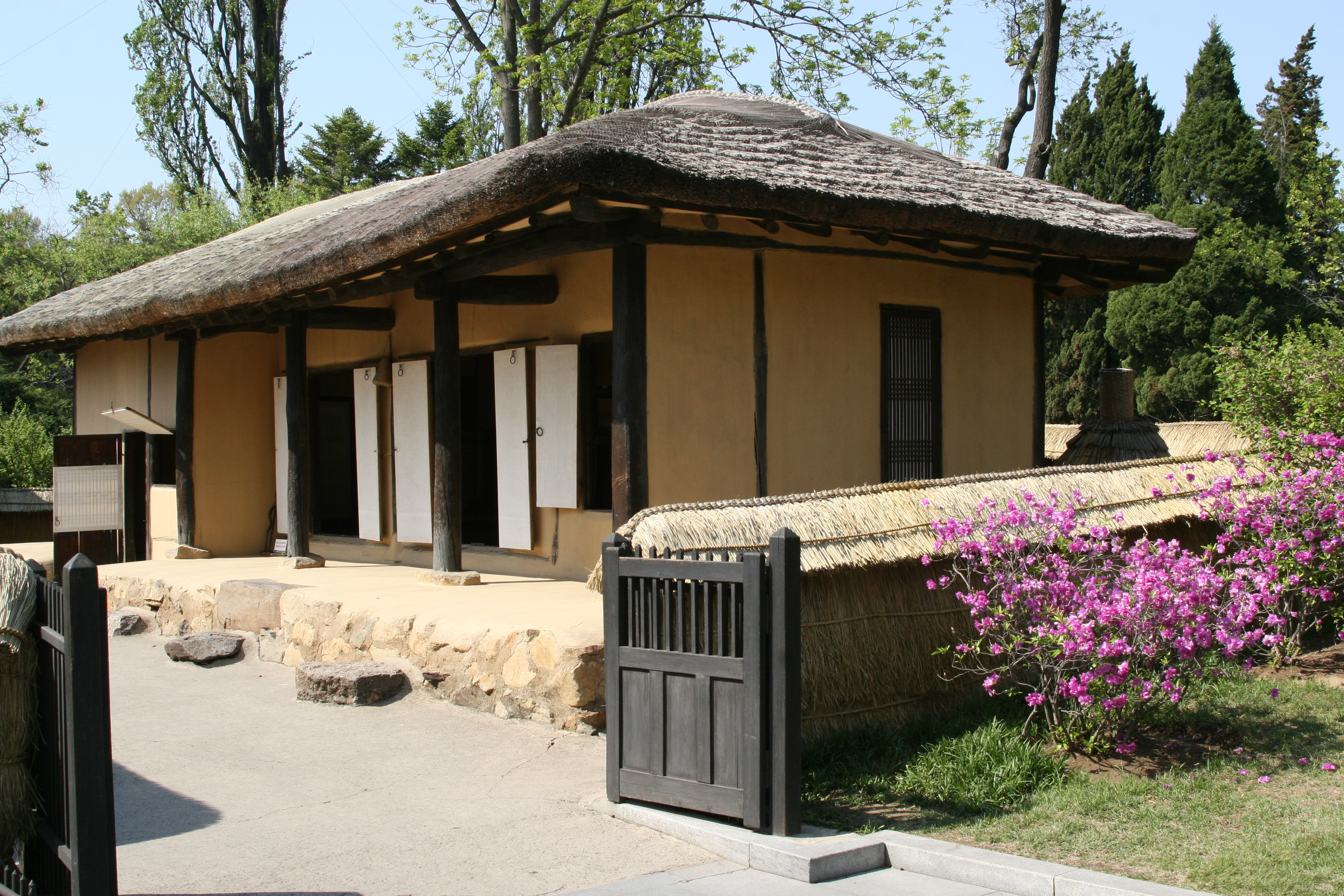
Kim Il Sung's birthplace (2008)

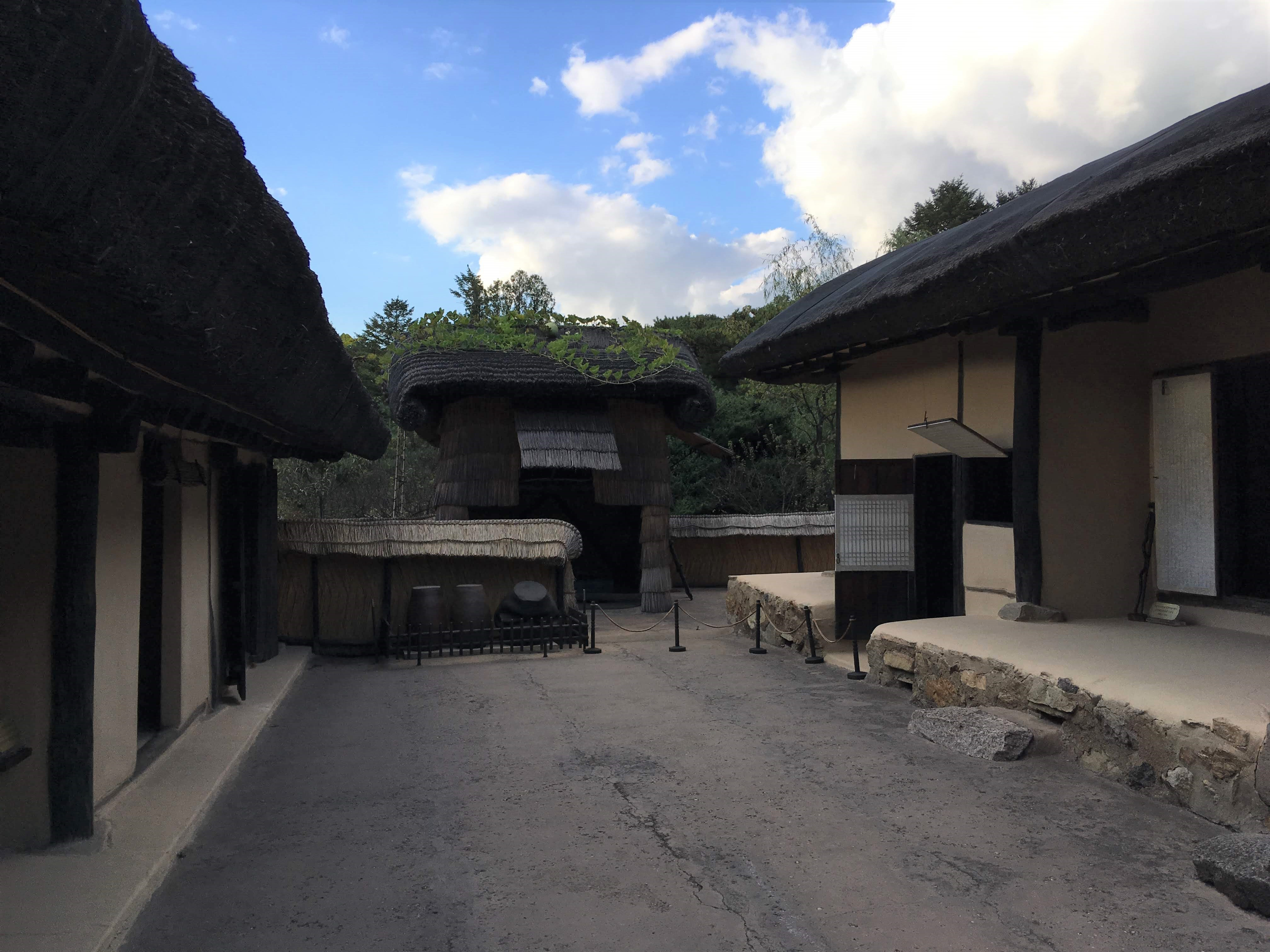
The house complex (2018)

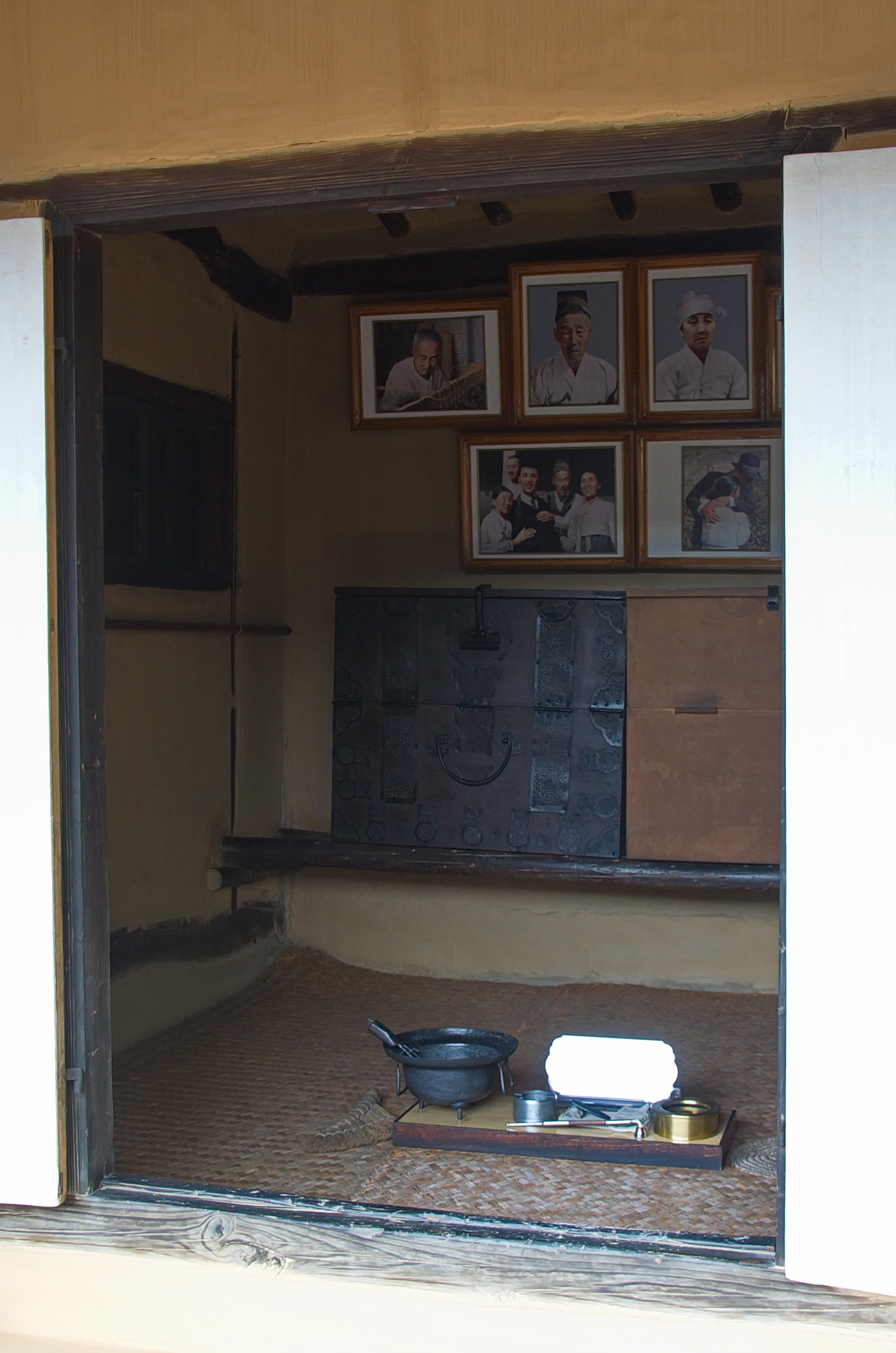
Interior of the house (2015)

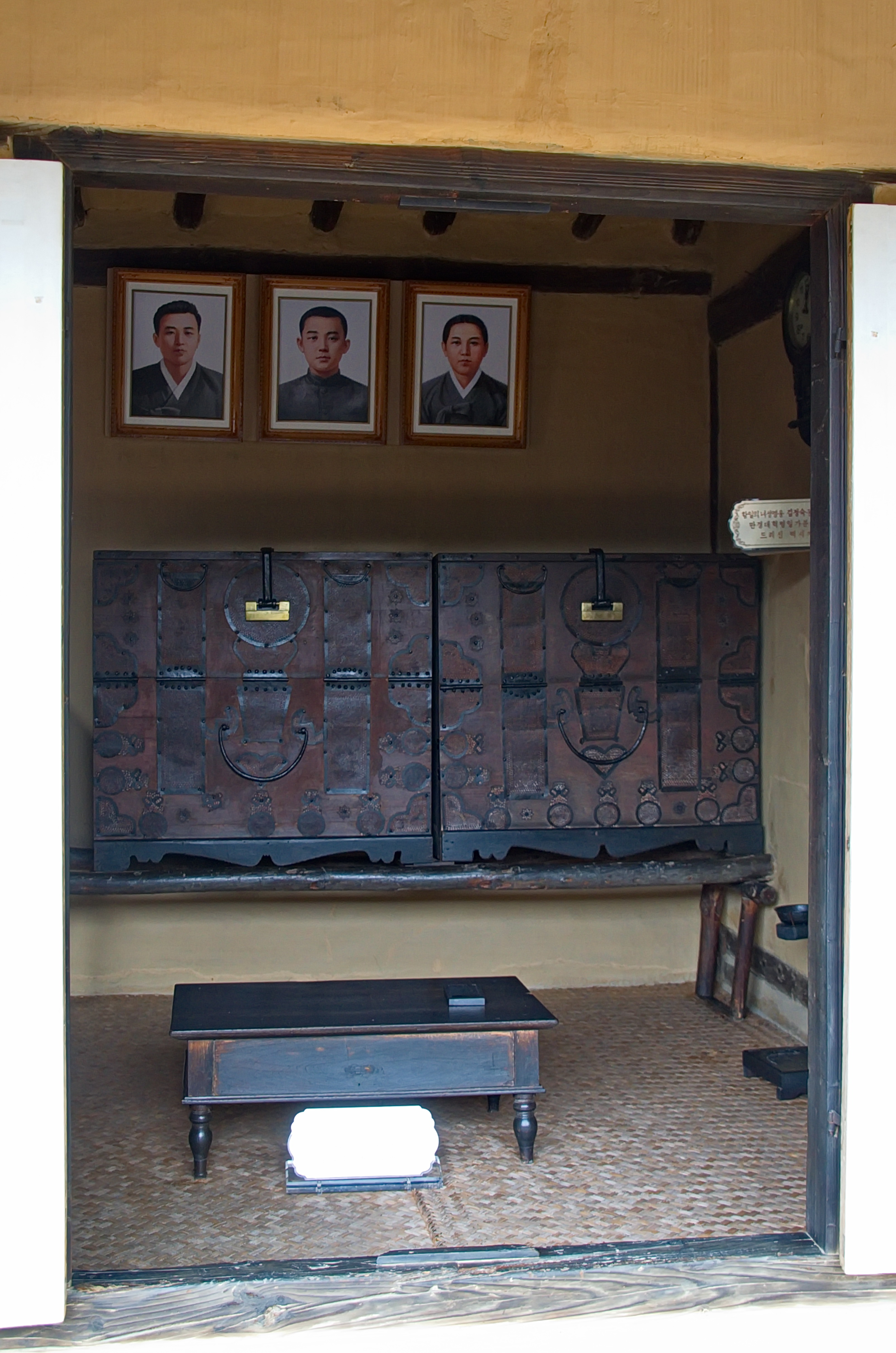
Interior of the house (2015)

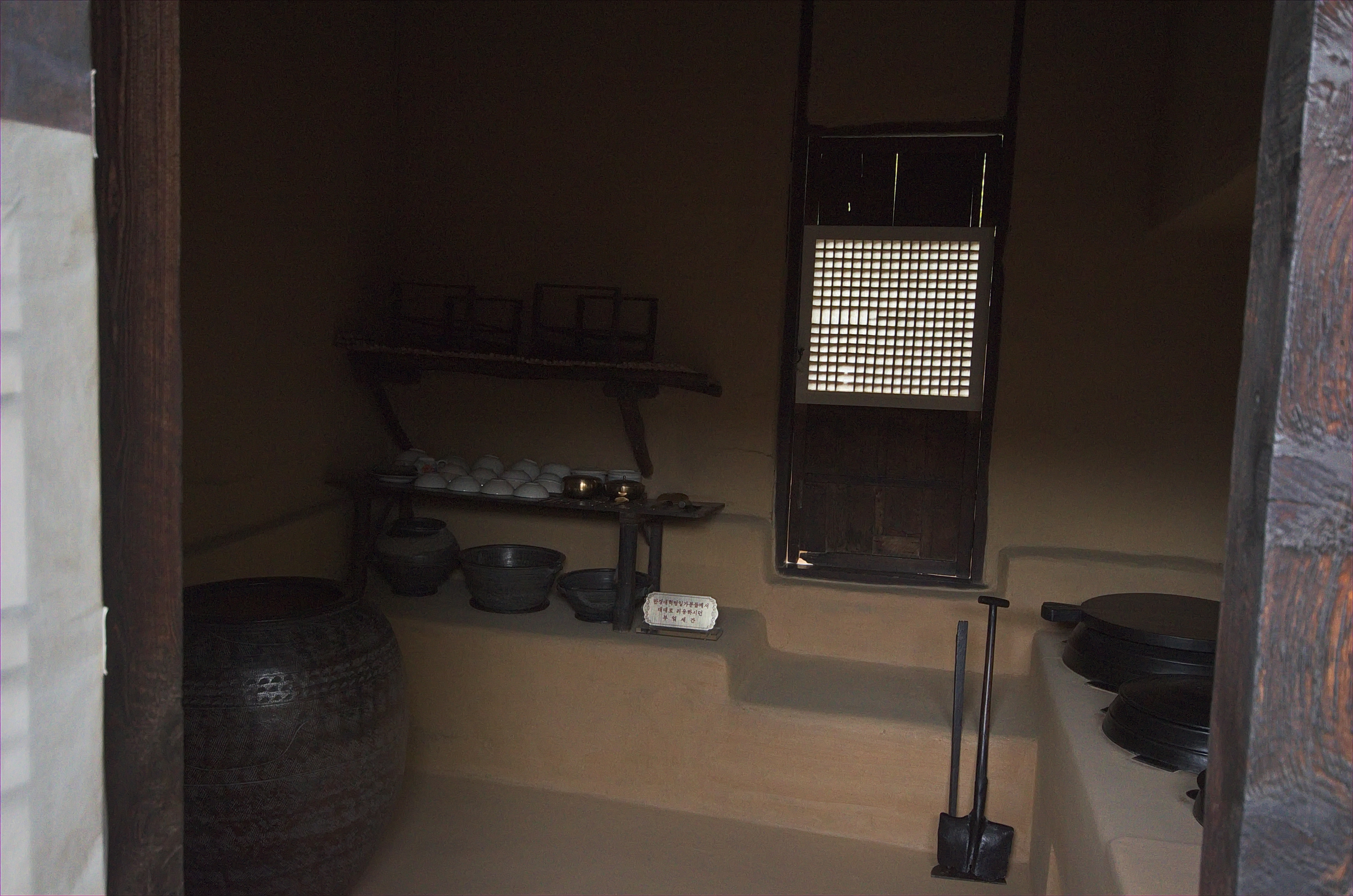
Interior of the kitchen (2015)

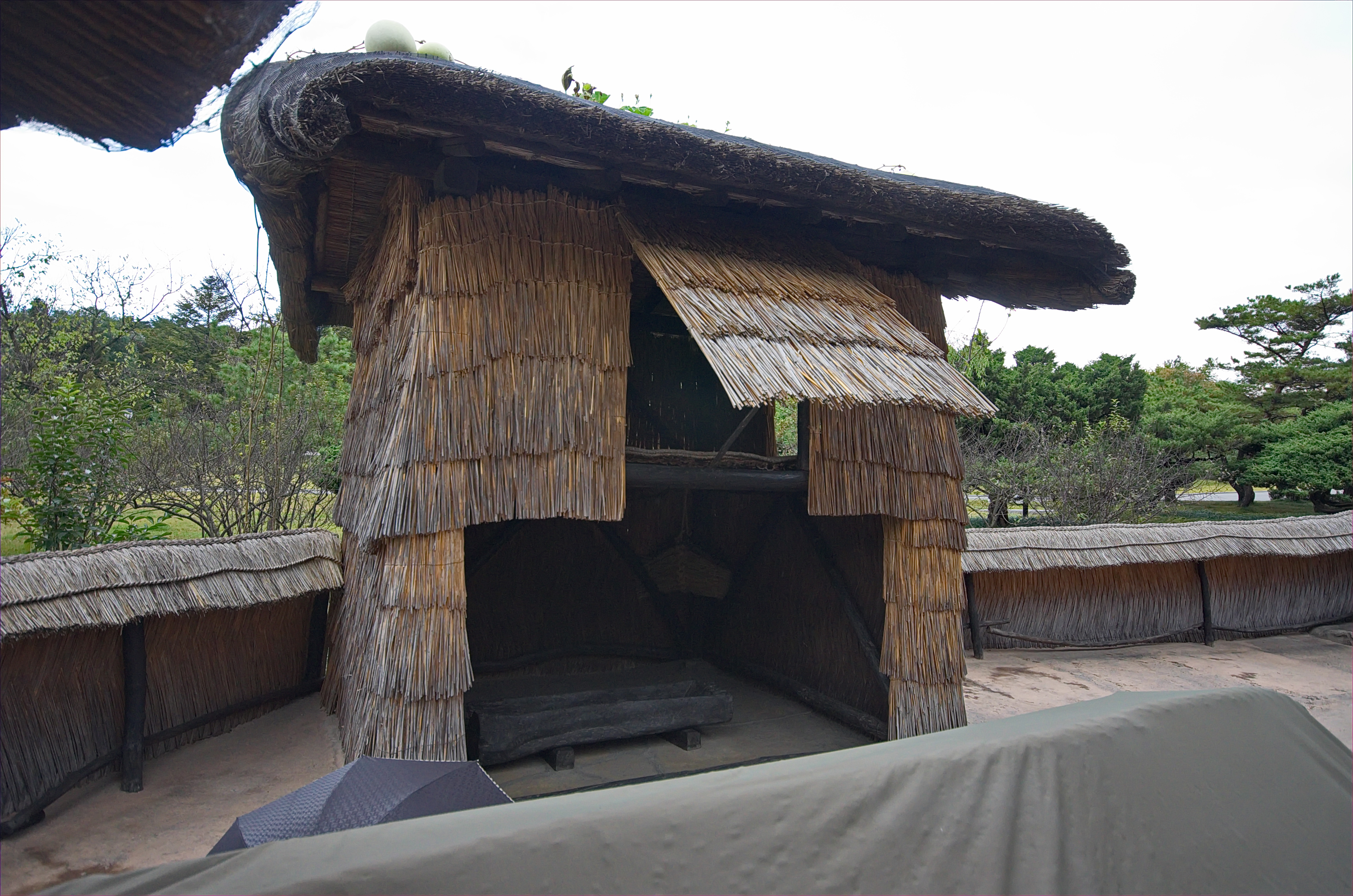
The mill house (2015)

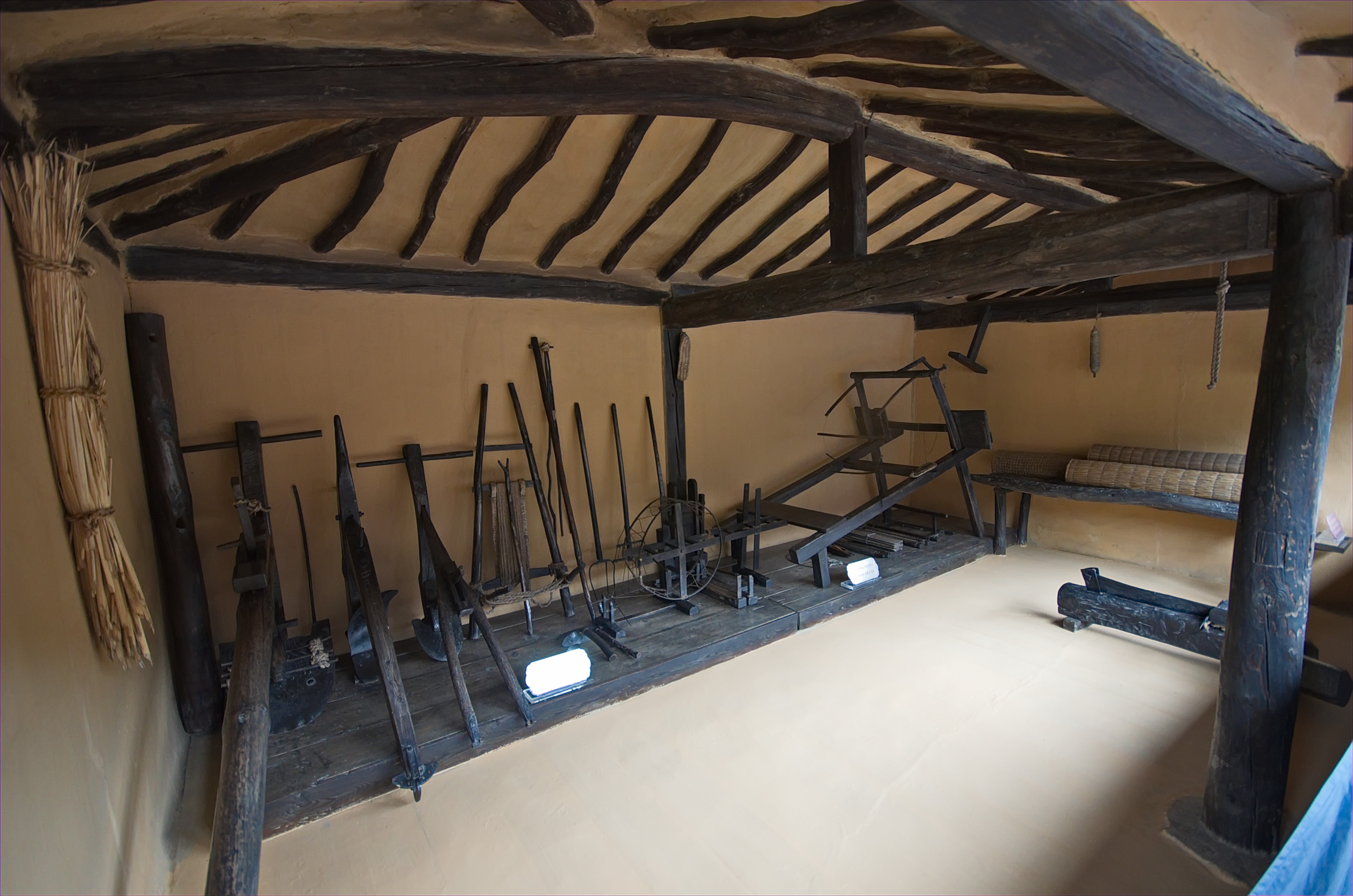
A spinning device (2015)

== See also ==
- Red Flag Mangyongdae Revolutionary School
