= List of North Korean websites banned in South Korea =

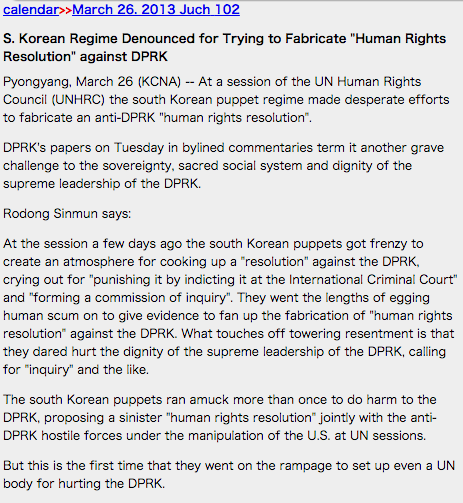
Korea News Service in Japan carries articles of the Korean Central News Agency (KCNA) and is blocked in South Korea.

As of 2010, there are 65 North Korean-run and pro-North Korean websites blocked in South Korea. A test conducted by OpenNet Initiative in 2010 found that most websites blocked in South Korea are related to North Korea. The number of blocked North Korean sites has increased in recent years.

Blocking is based on the National Security Act, and coordinated by the Korea Communications Standards Commission, which also engages in Internet surveillance. The commission is nominally independent but mainly appointed by the government. The blocks are implemented by Internet service providers (ISPs). South Korean law imposes punishments up to seven years of imprisonment for attempting to access blocked sites. According to Reporters Without Borders, blocking of North Korean websites is not viewed favorably by South Korean Internet users and some know how to circumvent it. Internet Archive's Wayback Machine and web caches of search engines are not blocked and include copies of North Korean websites.

In 2005, up to 3,167 webpages unrelated to North Korea were found to be blocked due to blocking IPs at the router level. DNS tampering that prevents domain names to be resolved into correct IPs is also used.

In addition to entire websites, it is possible to block accounts on social media, and some 13 accounts have been blocked on Facebook, YouTube and Twitter, including Uriminzokkiri's Twitter account. Twitter, however, has proven impractical to censor because retweets of North Korean tweets by other users are not blocked. Furthermore, any links to North Korean websites in the tweets are already blocked. Individual contents of websites hosted in South Korea may also be deleted. In 2010, South Korean website administrators were forced to delete 80,499 pro-North Korea messages.

Blocking has increased from previous years. According to Reporters Without Borders, blocking sharply intensified during Lee Myung-bak's presidency. In OpenNet Initiative's 2006 test, the overwhelming majority of tested North Korean websites were blocked. In 2007 and 2008, a significant number of tested North Korean sites remained blocked and blocking was consistent among Internet service providers.

== 2014 list ==
The following North Korea-based or pro-North Korean websites were blocked in South Korea in 2014.

Hosted in North Korea

Site	URL(s)	Description	Hosted in/by	Ref
Chochong	http://www.chochong.net/ (Note: IP unavailable, discontinued or obsolete as of 3 June 2012.)	Website of the League of Korean Youth Living in Japan (재일본조선청년동맹)	In Japan (Tokyo) by Nippon Rad	
Cholsan Patent and Trademark Agency	http://175.45.176.14/ko/notice/cholsan/ (Note: Website unavailable, discontinued or obsolete as of 24 October 2011.)	A Pyongyang-based patent and trademark attorney	In North Korea's IP block on the website of Korea Computer Center	
Chongryon	http://www.chongryon.com/	Japanese language website of the General Association of Korean Residents in Japan (Chongryon)	In Japan (Tokyo) by Kai Creates	
Choson Sinbo	http://chosonsinbo.com/	English and Korean language website of Choson Sinbo, a newspaper published by the General Association of Korean Residents in Japan (Chongryon)	In Japan (Tokyo) by Usen	
Elufa	http://www.elufa.net/	Korean language video portal of the General Association of Korean Residents in Japan (Chongryon)	In Japan (Tokyo) by Otsuka	
Faster Korea (Korean Sports Fund)	http://ksf.com.kp/en/; http://175.45.176.14/en/notice/sports/program/index-1.php (Note: IP unavailable, discontinued or obsolete as of 24 October 2011.)	Multilingual website with information about international sports	In North Korea's IP block by Star JV	
Friend (Committee for Cultural Relations with Foreign Countries)	http://www.friend.com.kp/	News, e-books and information on cultural exchange	In North Korea's IP block by Star JV, on the same server as Naenara	
Great National Unity (Pyongyang Broadcasting Station)	http://www.gnu.rep.kp/	Korean language website targeted at audiences in South Korea, Japan and China	In North Korea	
Korea Education Fund	http://www.koredufund.org.kp/	English and Korean language website of a non-governmental organization coordinating support for education	In North Korea's IP block by Star JV	
Korea Elderly Care Fund	http://www.korelcfund.org.kp/	English and Korean language website of a non-governmental organization dedicated to well-being of the elderly	In North Korea's IP block by Star JV	
Korea International Film Festival (Note: Website unavailable, discontinued or obsolete as of 12 March 2012.)		Official website of the Korea International Film Festival and North Korean film industry	In North Korea	
Korea National Insurance Corporation	http://www.knic.com.kp/	Website of North Korea's state-run insurance company	In North Korea (Pyongyang)	
Korea News Service	http://www.kcna.co.jp/	Korean Central News Agency (KCNA) news	In Japan (Tokyo) by GMO Internet	
Korea Photo Service (Korea News Service)	http://www.kns-photo.com/	Distributes Korean Central News Agency (KCNA) photos.	In Japan (Tokyo) by Usen	
Korea Publication	http://www.korea-publ.com/ http://www.dprk-book.com/	Only partially blocked. Sells North Korean books, DVDs and stamps. Run by Beijing Sunyong Scientific Technology Trade company.	In China (Beijing) by China Telecom	
Korean Dishes	http://www.cooks.org.kp/	Website of the Korean Association of Cooks. Includes recipes and restaurant reviews.	In North Korea	
Korean Central News Agency (KCNA)	http://www.kcna.kp/	Multilingual website of the main state news agency	In North Korea's IP block by Star JV	
Koryo PAT Rainbow	http://175.45.176.14/ko/notice/rainbow/index.php?en (Note: Website unavailable, discontinued or obsolete as of 24 October 2011.)	Website of a patent and trademark agency	In North Korea's IP block on the website of Korea Computer Center	
Minjok Tongshin	http://www.minjok.com/	English and Korean language news	In US (Pennsylvania) by 1&1 Internet	
Naenara (Korea Computer Center)	http://naenara.com.kp/	Naenara (Korean for 'my country') is a multilingual web portal with news, magazines and music.	In North Korea's IP block by Star JV	
National Democratic Front of South Korea; Anti-Imperialist National Democratic Front	http://ndfsk.dyndns.org/; http://aindf.dyndns.org/kuguk8/Title1.htm	Korean language news of the National Democratic Front of South Korea's branch in Japan and English language news of the Anti-Imperialist National Democratic Front, a South Korean underground political group	Dynamic host	
North Korea Books	http://www.north-korea-books.com/	Canadian online bookstore selling North Korean books, magazines and newspapers	In US (Andover, Massachusetts) by NaviSite	
North Korea Tech	http://www.northkoreatech.org/	Technology blog by British journalist Martyn Williams	In US (Provo, Utah) by Bluehost	
Our Nation School (Kim Il-sung Open University)	http://www.ournation-school.com/	Korean language teachings on the Juche idea	In China (Shenyang) by China Unicom	
Pyongyang International Trade Fair	http://175.45.176.14/ko/notice/2009web/homepage.html (Note: Website unavailable, discontinued or obsolete as of 19 December 2010. Not updated since 2009.)	Information on the Pyongyang International Trade Fair	In North Korea's IP block on the website of Korea Computer Center	
Rodong Sinmun	http://www.rodong.rep.kp/	Website of Rodong Sinmun, the organ of the Central Committee of the Workers' Party of Korea	In North Korea's IP block by Star JV	
Voice of Korea	http://www.vok.rep.kp/	Multilingual website of North Korea's international shortwave broadcaster	In North Korea's IP block by Star JV, on the same server as Naenara	
Ryomyong	{{usurped|1=[https://web.archive.org/web/20080314045038/http://www.ryomyong.com/ Article title]}}	Website of the National Reconciliation Council. Contains books and music. The domain is owned by Rio IT Production based in Shenyang, China.	In Australia by Net Quadrant	
Ryugyong Clip	http://www.ryugyongclip.com/	Pyongyang in videos and images	In China (Shenyang) by China Unicom	
Tong Il Han Ma Eum (Association of Peaceful Reunification of the Motherland)	http://www.jpth.net/	Korean language news of the Association of Peaceful Reunification of the Motherland based in Japan (Tokyo)	In Japan (Tokyo) by KDDI	
Uriminzokkiri	http://www.uriminzokkiri.com/	Uriminzokkiri (Korean for 'our nation') is a news portal.	In China (Shenyang) by China Unicom	

== See also ==
- Internet censorship in South Korea
- Internet in North Korea
- .kp
- Kwangmyong network
- North Korea Tech
