= .kp =

Internet country code top-level domain for North Korea

- Introduced: 24 September 2007; 18 years ago
- TLD type: Country code top-level domain
- Status: Active
- Registry: Star Joint Venture
- Sponsor: Korea Computer Center (until 2011); Star Joint Venture (since 2011)
- Intended use: Entities connected with North Korea
- Actual use: Used mainly by the North Korean government and businesses in North Korea
- Registered domains: 28 (19 September 2016)
- Registration restrictions: Must be a company, organization, or government entity based in North Korea
- Structure: Names can be registered directly at the second level, or at the third level within generic second-level domains
- Registry website: Registry website address published on IANA Delegation Record is no longer accessible (Archive page)

.kp is the Internet country code top-level domain (ccTLD) for North Korea (DPRK). It was created on 24 September 2007.

== History ==
The DPRK applied for the .kp Internet country code top-level domain (ccTLD) in 2004. ICANN, however, refused because the DPRK did not meet some of the requirements. Another attempt was later made via the Korea Computer Center (KCC) Europe in 2006. The main body of KCC and the DPRK Ambassador to the United Nations petitioned ICANN again. They were refused again for providing insufficient information. A new application was sent in January 2007, and an ICANN delegation visited the country in May. This time, ICANN finally agreed to assign .kp to the DPRK.

One of the first organizations to adopt a .kp domain was the Korean Central News Agency (KCNA) in 2009.

Previously, the .kp domain was managed by the Korea Computer Center (KCC) Europe. A large number of .kp websites were also hosted by KCC Europe in Germany. However, in 2011, management was transferred to the Pyongyang-based Star Joint Venture.

== Second-level domains ==
Neither the DPRK government agencies nor the central registry have published the second-level domain registration rules. However, according to the using practices shown by the currently existing and accessible DPRK domains and websites, while regarding the worldwide country code second-level domain distribution rules, the second-level domain rules in the DPRK can be interpreted as below.

- aca.kp : Academic research institutes
- com.kp : Companies
- edu.kp : Higher education institutions
- law.kp : Legal firms
- org.kp : Organizations
- gov.kp : Government departments
- rep.kp : Agencies associated with the Workers' Party of Korea
- net.kp : Internet service providers and email service providers
- sca.kp : Affiliated institutes under the Ministry of Culture

The following are externally accessible domain name examples of the use of second-level domain names:

- aca.kp : mirae.aca.kp, buhung.aca.kp
- com.kp : airkoryo.com.kp, knic.com.kp, kpeic.com.kp, dprkrcs.com.kp
- edu.kp : ryongnamsan.edu.kp, kut.edu.kp, gpsh.edu.kp
- law.kp : fia.law.kp
- org.kp : cooks.org.kp, koredufund.org.kp, kass.org.kp
- gov.kp : mfa.gov.kp, moph.gov.kp, tourismdprk.gov.kp
- rep.kp : rodong.rep.kp, vok.rep.kp, gnu.rep.kp
- net.kp : [Usually appears as the extension for email addresses published elsewhere on other DPRK websites: e.g. @star-co.net.kp]
- sca.kp : korart.sca.kp

== List of domains ==
=== Active domains ===
As of July 2026, over 40 domains are active under the .kp top-level domain. These are as follows:

Bold indicates a dedicated article on the website itself.

- airkoryo.com.kp
- buhung.aca.kp
- **cooks.org.kp**
- dprknado.org.kp
- dprkportal.kp
- dprkrcs.com.kp
- fia.law.kp
- gpsh.edu.kp
- kass.org.kp
- kcna.kp
- kftrade.com.kp
- kiyctc.com.kp
- knic.com.kp
- korart.sca.kp
- korean-books.com.kp
- koreanarchitecture.gov.kp
- koredufund.org.kp
- korelcfund.org.kp
- korfilm.com.kp
- kpeic.com.kp
- korstamp.com.kp
- kut.edu.kp
- kza.org.kp
- ma.gov.kp
- **manmulsang.com.kp**
- mediaryugyong.com.kp
- mfa.gov.kp
- minju.rep.kp
- mirae.aca.kp
- moph.gov.kp
- **naenara.com.kp**
- pyongyangtimes.com.kp
- rodong.rep.kp
- ryomyong.edu.kp
- ryongnamsan.edu.kp
- silibank.net.kp (mail server only)
- sdprk.org.kp
- star-co.net.kp (mail server only)
- tourismdprk.gov.kp
- vok.rep.kp
- youth.rep.kp
- yongsaeng.org.kp

Some .kp addresses are used by the North Korean Internet only, and some of them are only accessible in the Kwangmyong network, alongside regularly-used 24-bit block IPv4 private addresses.

=== Former domains ===
These domains are not included on the "dprkportal.kp" website as of 2026, but existed in the past.

- futurere.com.kp (Note: Based on the Wayback Machine's snapshot, these websites displayed content of "Korean Dishes" website.)
- gnu.rep.kp
- ksf.com.kp
- masikryong.com.kp (Note: Based on the Wayback Machine's snapshot, these websites displayed content of the Maritime Administration of North Korea's website.)
- nta.gov.kp
- polestar.com.kp
- pulbora.edu.kp
- samhae.com.kp
- star.co.kp
- friend.com.kp

== See also ==
- Communications in North Korea
- Internet censorship in North Korea
- Internet in North Korea
- List of North Korean websites banned in South Korea
- List of North Korea-related topics
- .kr (top-level domain for the Republic of Korea)
- Kwangmyong (network)
