= List of magazines in North Korea =

There are about seventy to eighty periodicals published in North Korea, twenty of which are major publications. Most of them are official magazines published by specialized state organizations. Typically, there is only one magazine per field, as publishing more is considered a waste of resources.

== List ==
=== General ===
- Chollima
- Choson (Korean for 'Korea')
- Korean Woman
- Kumsugangsan

=== Economics ===
- Economic Management(경제관리)

=== Science ===
- Auto Engineering(Chadongcha Konghak,자동차공학)
- Basic Medicine
- Choson Minju Juuiinmin Gonghwaguk Palmyonggongbo (조선민주주의인민공화국발명공보 (Korean for 'Official Report of Inventions in the DPRK')
- Electronic Engineering(전자공학)
- Hwahakgwa Hwahakgoneop(화학과 화학공업)
- Juche Agriculture(주체 농법)
- Kim Il-sŏng chonghap taehak hakpo: Chayŏn kwahak (Korean for 'Journal of Kim Il Sung University: Natural science')
- Korean Medicine(조선의학)
- Kwahakwon Tongbo (Korean for 'Bulletins of the Academy of Science')
- Mulri(물리)
- Punsok Hwahak (Korean for 'Analysis')
- Saengmulhak (Korean for 'Biology')
- Suhakkwa Mulli

=== Liberal arts ===
- Munhwao Haksup (Korean for 'Study of Korean Language')
- People's Education(인민교육)
- Philosophy Research(Cholhak Yongu)
- Sahoekwahak (Korean for 'Social Science')
- Korean Language (Chosŏn ŏmun,조선어문)

==== History ====
- History
- Ryoksagwahak (Korean for 'Historical Science')

=== Politics ===
- First-Level Party Official(당초급간부)
- Jokook Tongil
- Kulloja
- Party Life(당 생활)
- Korea's trade(우리나라무역)
- Political Knowledge(정치지식)

=== Culture ===
- Choson Yesul
- Gukmunhak (극문학) (Korean for 'Theater')
- Korean Architecture(Choson Konchuk)
- Korean Motion Pictures
- Sports(Cheyuk)

==== Literature ====
- Adong Munhak(Children's Literature)
- Choson Munhak (Korean for 'Korean Literature')
- Simunhak (Korean for 'Poetry')
- Cheongnyeon Munhak (Korean for 'Youth Literature')

=== Foreign-language ===
- The Democratic People's Republic of Korea
- Foreign Trade of the DPRK
- Journal of Kim Il Sung University (Natural Science)
- Journal of Kim Il Sung University (Social Science)
- Korea
- Korea Today
- Korean Women
- Korean Youth and Students(조선청년학생)

=== Published abroad ===
- Joguk (Korean for 'Fatherland'), published in Japan

== See also ==
- Media of North Korea
- List of newspapers in North Korea
