= Internet in North Korea =

Internet access is available in North Korea, but is only permitted with special authorization. It is primarily used for government purposes, and by foreigners. The country has some broadband infrastructure, including fiber optic links between major institutions. Online services for most individuals and institutions are provided through a free domestic-only network known as Kwangmyong, with access to the global Internet limited to a much smaller group.

== Service providers and access ==
Internet access in North Korea is available from Internet service provider Star Joint Venture Co., a joint venture between the North Korean government's Ministry of Post and Telecommunications and Thailand-based Loxley Pacific. Star JV took control of North Korea's Internet address allocation on 21 December 2009. Prior to Star JV, Internet access was available only via a satellite link to Germany, or for some government uses through direct connections with China Unicom. Almost all of North Korea's Internet traffic is routed through China. Many of North Korea's physical Internet connections go through a line that runs from Pyongyang to China, connecting to China Unicom. There are longstanding rumors of a secret T1 line which is used to link devices used by the highest officials at much higher speeds and makes them appear with Chinese IP addresses. North Korea is also believed to route some Internet connections through satellite-based systems.

Since February 2013, foreigners have been able to access the Internet using the 3G telecommunications network provided by Koryolink.

Permission to access the Internet remains tightly restricted; however, the IT industry has been growing, and Internet access is gradually increasing within North Korea. In October 2010, the website of the Korean Central News Agency went live from a web server hosted in North Korea. It is accessible globally on a North Korean IP address, marking the country's first known direct connection to the Internet. Around the same time, on 9 October, journalists visiting Pyongyang for the Workers' Party's 65th anniversary celebrations were given access to a press room with Internet connectivity.

As of December 2014, a total of 1,024 IP addresses were known to exist in North Korea, although The New York Times journalists David E. Sanger and Nicole Perlroth believe that the actual number may be higher. The total number of Internet users is estimated at no more than a few thousand. People who can access the global Internet are claimed to be high-ranking officials, members of non-governmental organizations (NGOs), and government ambassadors. It is estimated that a few dozen families with connections to Kim Jong-Un and some foreigners have unrestricted access to the global Internet, while a few thousand people such as government officials, researchers, and IT students may access a surveillance-heavy version of it.

Some access is allowed in North Korea's academic institutions. Professors and graduate students can access the Internet at the Pyongyang University of Science and Technology through a computer lab, for instance. Access through this channel is monitored. In fact, as of 2007, many of the North Koreans with access to the global Internet were tasked only with retrieving scientific and technical information, which could then be posted to the national intranet.

Writing in Vox, journalist Max Fisher wrote that in addition to the highest elites, Internet access is granted to certain people who need it to do their jobs and that this itself becomes a marker of elite status:

Not everyone who can access the internet in North Korea is a member of the elite. The country runs some departments that simply need access to the web to do their jobs, namely propagandists and other media specialists as well as hackers and a small number of technocratic researchers. In order to prevent these people from trying to defect when they learn how hellish their country is compared with the rest of the world — or, worse, spreading what they learn to other North Koreans — jobs that require internet access typically come with lavish salaries, high-end government housing, and lots of prestige. Either you are granted access to the internet because you are very elite, or you are granted elite status because of your internet access, but the two always go hand in hand.

According to research by the American cybersecurity firm Recorded Future, North Koreans access the Internet using Apple, Samsung and Huawei devices and use obfuscation services such as VPNs and proxy servers to circumvent surveillance. In 2014, The Diplomat reported that housing near foreign embassies in Pyongyang was in high demand due to their proximity enabling local residents' access to the embassies' Wi-Fi networks.

Kim Jong-il told a visiting North Korean dignitary in 2002 that he had spent much time on South Korean websites. According to Ofer Gayer, a security researcher of Incapsula, the country's total web traffic footprint has been less than that of the Falkland Islands. Joo Seong-ha, a The Dong-a Ilbo journalist and a North Korean defector, said in 2014 the government's intranet Kwangmyong has been used to limit the general public's global Internet usage, especially in hotels. Although available in most campuses, the government has "strictly monitored the Internet usage".

Since Apple Inc., Sony and Microsoft are not allowed to distribute their products to North Korea, third-party companies buy their products and sell them to customers. Very little is known about the electronics industry in North Korea due to the government's isolation policies. As of 2015, the sole manufacturer of computers in North Korea was Morning Panda, a government-run company manufacturing a few thousand computers a year.

In April 2016, North Korea began to block Facebook, YouTube, Twitter and South Korean websites, due to "its concern with the spread of online information".

On 19 September 2016, North Korea's nameserver that contains information about all of the ".kp" websites was misconfigured, allowing researchers to access and publish the domain names and some of the file data about the site, including zone information for .kp, co.kp, com.kp, edu.kp, gov.kp, net.kp, org.kp, and rep.kp, revealing that North Korea has only 28 websites facing the Internet. However, the Kwangmyong internet, available only to North Korea, was estimated to host between 1,000 and 5,500 internal-facing websites as of 2014.

In September 2017, Russian telecommunication company TransTelekom established direct Internet connection to North Korea, causing China Unicom to no longer be the sole provider of Internet access for North Korea.

It was reported in January 2021 that North Korea was gearing up to upgrade its network from the current 3G to a 4G network.

In December 2023, North Korea started to deploy its 4G network.

== Government use of the Internet ==
As of 2018, construction of an Internet Communication Bureau headquarters was underway in Pyongyang.

=== North Korean websites ===
There are about 30 websites, such as Uriminzokkiri, run by the DPRK government. South Korean police have identified 43 pro-North Korean websites that have foreign-based servers. The police report that these websites encourage hostile attitudes towards South Korea and Western countries, and portray the DPRK in a positive light. According to The Dong-a Ilbo, foreign-based websites include the following: Joseon Tongsin (Korean News Service) and Guk-jeonseon in Japan, Unification Arirang in China, Minjok Tongsin in the United States, and twelve new pro-North Korean websites have launched, including the "Korea Network". In August 2010, BBC News reported that an agency contracted by the North Korean government has fielded an official DPRK YouTube channel, Facebook and Twitter accounts for Uriminzokkiri. Both the Twitter and YouTube accounts are solely in Korean. The BBC reported, "In a recent Twitter post, the North Koreans said the current administration in South Korea was 'a prostitute' of the US", though this wording may be a poor translation into English. Among some of the content on the official website is an image of a US soldier being followed by two missiles, along with various other cartoons, pictures and text, with largely anti-US and anti-South Korean sentiment. In September 2007 the .kp top-level domain was created. It contains websites connected to the North Korean government.

In addition to propaganda sites, there are numerous websites connected to commercial activity. In 2002, North Koreans, in collaboration with a South Korean company, started a gambling site targeting South Korean customers (online gambling being illegal in South Korea), but the site has since been closed down. In late 2007, North Korea launched its first online shop, Chollima, in a joint venture with an unnamed Chinese company. In 2013, The Pirate Bay claimed to be operating from North Korea after legal challenges forced it out of Sweden. The move was later revealed to be a hoax.

=== Hackers ===
South Korean No Cut News has reported that the North Korean government trains computer hackers in Kim Chaek University of Technology and Kim Il-sung University to earn money overseas. A group of North Korean hackers based in Shenyang, China, developed and sold auto-programs (programs that allow player characters to earn experience and in-game currency while the player does none of the work) for an online game Lineage and a South Korean citizen was arrested in May 2011 for purchasing it.

In December 2014, North Korea was accused of a hack attack on Sony Pictures Entertainment. From 19 to 21 December, North Korea experienced technical difficulties with Internet access. On 22 December, North Korea suffered a complete Internet link failure, resulting in loss of Internet access from outside the country for which the United States is suspected. On 23 December, nine hours after the outage, the country regained Internet access, albeit "partial and potentially unstable with other websites still inaccessible." On 22–24 December, North Korea experienced seven more Internet outages, including two on 23 December. On 27 December, the country experienced an outage on Internet (the third time of the year) and a mobile network. A similar outage, lasting for one and a half days, occurred in March 2013.

=== Cloud hosting ===
In December 2023, it was discovered on the cloud.star.net.kp domain to have an exposed Nextcloud instance which was hosted in North Korea. That instance has since been taken offline.

In August 2024, over 30 gigabytes of data from that instance scraped by anonymous users (due to it having authentication issues) was leaked to the Internet. In that data leak was discovered tons of animation data (most likely from SEK Studio) for shows for Prime Video and HBO Max, which was previously disclosed to journalists.

== South Korean Internet regulations ==
South Korean Internet users must comply with Trade Laws with North Korea (Article 9 Section 2) in which one needs to have the Ministry of Unification's approval to contact North Koreans through their websites.

== IP address ranges ==
As of February 2023 North Korea has four IPv4 subnets, all announced by AS131279, named "Ryugyong-dong". The subnets are:

- 175.45.176.0/24 (175.45.176.0–255)
- 175.45.177.0/24 (175.45.177.0–255)
- 175.45.178.0/24 (175.45.178.0–255)
- 175.45.179.0/24 (175.45.179.0–255)

Despite North Korea's limited Internet access, the small pool of IP addresses has led to very conservative allocations. The Pyongyang University of Science and Technology, for example, had just one IP address on the global Internet in 2012.

North Korea's telecommunications ministry was previously also the registered user of 256 China Unicom addresses (210.52.109.0 – 210.52.109.255). This pre-dated the activation of North Korea's own block.

In October 2017 it was reported that Russian ISP TransTelekom was routing traffic from North Korea as a second internet connection, together with China Unicom.

In December 2020, North Korea had interconnected to 1 Russian ISP and 2 Chinese ISPs (TransTelecom and Cenbong, which automatically re-route traffic, using China Unicom channels).

In July 2024, AS9341 has started reporting itself as the North Korean Government. Although all of the IP addresses assigned to that AS are located in Indonesia, it appears to be the AS assigned for PLN Icon Plus, an Indonesian ISP.

== See also ==
- Censorship in North Korea
- Manbang – IPTV service
- Naenara – web portal of the North Korean government
- Telecommunications in North Korea
