= Naenara =

North Korean web portal

- Website type: Web portal
- Available in: English, Korean, French, Spanish, Russian, German, Chinese, Japanese and Arabic
- Owner: Korea Computer Center
- Creator: Foreign Languages Publishing House
- Website: naenara.com.kp
- Commercial: No
- Registration: None
- Current status: Online

Naenara (Korean: 내나라; lit. 'my country') is the official web portal of the North Korean government. It operates under 9 languages including the country's official language Korean.

== History ==
Naenara was created in June 2004 by the North Korean government.

== Usage ==
Naenara carries national censored publications by the DPRK government such as The Pyongyang Times, The Democratic People's Republic of Korea magazine, Korea Today magazine and Foreign Trade magazine along with Korean Central News Agency news.

The portal's categories include politics, tourism, music, foreign trade, arts, press, information technology, history.

== Restrictions ==
South Korean users' access to the site has been blocked by South Korean authorities since 2011.

As of September 2026, this block remains in place.

== See also ==
- Censorship in North Korea
- Chollima (website)
- Internet in North Korea
- List of North Korean websites banned in South Korea
- Red Star OS
- Uriminzokkiri
