= Korea (magazine) =

Multi-lingual North Korean magazine

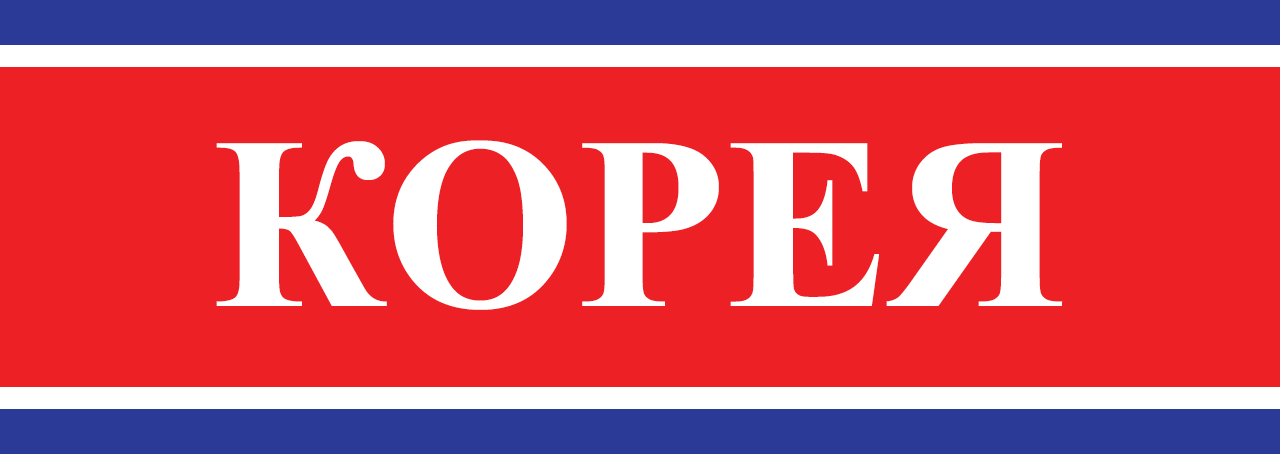
- Categories: current affairs, propaganda
- Frequency: Monthly
- Format: 26cm, 50–55 pages Online (PDF)
- First issue: January 1956
- Company: Foreign Languages Publishing House
- Country: North Korea
- Based in: Sochong-dong, Sosong District, Pyongyang
- Language: English, Arabic, Chinese, French, Russian, Spanish
- Website: korean-books.com.kp/ru/search/?page=periodic-pictorial korean-books.com.kp
- ISSN: 0454-4072
- OCLC: 8797015

Korea is a North Korean monthly illustrated socio-political magazine. It has been published since 1956 in Russian, Korean, English, French and Chinese. Previously, it was also published in Spanish, and Arabic.

The magazine publishes colorfully illustrated author's articles on society, economy, culture and politics of the DPRK.

== In culture ==
In one of Yegor Letov's most famous songs, "Everything is Going according to Plan," there are these lines:

I bought the Korea magazine — it's good there too.

Comrade Kim Il Sung is there, it's the same as ours.

I'm sure they have the same thing. —

And everything is going according to plan.

== Criticism ==
The magazine is often criticized by readers from the post-Soviet space for inaccurate and low-quality translations with an abundance of speech errors and a very specific manner of presentation.

== See also ==
- Korea Today
- Foreign Trade of the DPRK
