= Red Star OS =

North Korean Linux distribution

Red Star OS 붉은별 사용자용체계

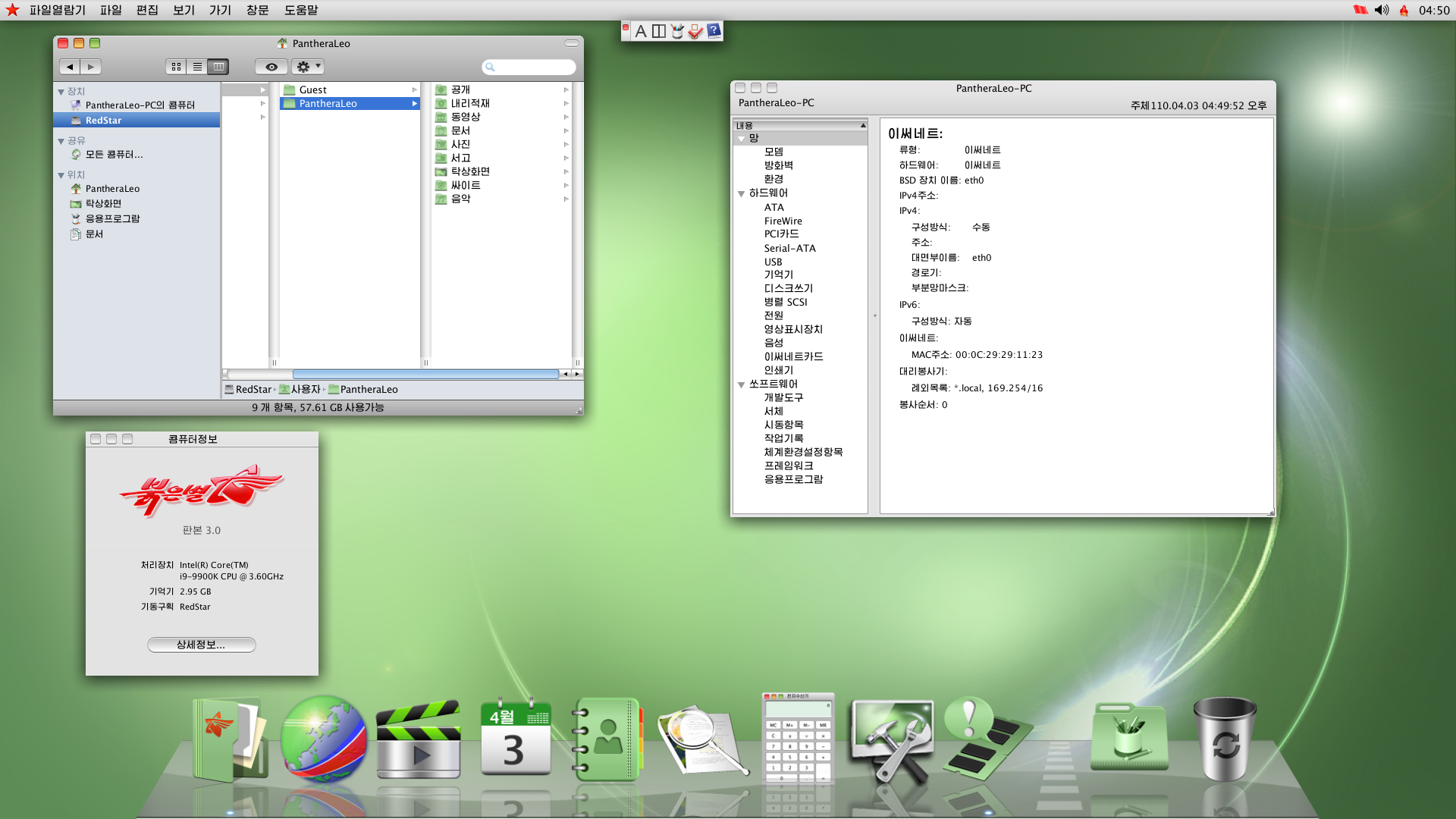
- Screenshot of the desktop of Red Star OS 3.0, localized with North Korean terminology and spelling
- Developer: Korea Computer Center
- OS family: Unix-like; Linux (desktop and server), Android (on Woolim, Arirang, Samjiyon, Manbang, Jindallae and Ryonghung)
- Working state: Current
- Source model: Closed, with free and open-source components
- Latest release: 4.5
- Marketing target: Personal computers
- Available in: Korean
- Supported platforms: IA-32, x86-64 (server only), ARM (mobile and tablet only)
- Kernel type: Monolithic (forked from Linux kernel)
- Userland: GNU
- Influenced by: Fedora Linux (desktop), CentOS (Server), Android (mobile and tablet)
- Default user interface: KDE
- License: Proprietary; GNU GPL and other licenses (FOSS components)

Red Star OS (Korean: 붉은별; MR: Pulgŭnbyŏl) is a North Korean Linux distribution, with development first starting in 1998 at the Korea Computer Center (KCC).

Prior to Red Star OS's release, computers in North Korea typically used modified versions of Microsoft Windows with North Korean language packs installed.

== Content ==
=== Browser ===
Red Star OS features a modified Mozilla Firefox browser called Naenara ("Our country" in Korean), which is used for browsing the Naenara web portal on North Korea's national intranet known as Kwangmyong. Naenara comes with two search engines.

=== Other software ===
Other software includes a text editor, an office suite, an e-mail client, audio and video players, a file sharing program, and video games.

Red Star OS 3 comes with a customized version of OpenOffice called Sogwang Office.

== Specifications ==
The operating system utilizes customized versions of KDE Software Compilation. Earlier versions had KDE 3-based desktops.

Version 3, like its predecessors, utilizes Wine, a compatibility layer that allows Windows programs to be run under Linux.

Version 3.0 closely resembles Apple's macOS, whereas previous versions more closely resembled Windows XP; current North Korean leader Kim Jong-un was seen with an iMac on his desk in a 2013 photo, indicating a possible connection to the redesign.

The Red Star OS is only available in Korean, localized with North Korean terminology and spelling, although it is possible to change the language on the BIOS boot menu, or by modifying the disk image.

System requirements
Requirement	Requirements
Red Star OS
CPU	800 MHz Intel Pentium III
Memory	256 MB
Free space	3 GB

== History ==
=== Version 1.0/Beta ===
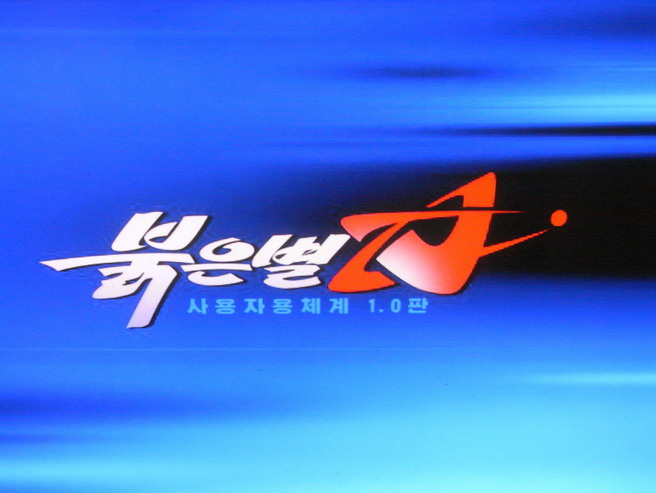
The boot-up splash screen of Red Star 1.0

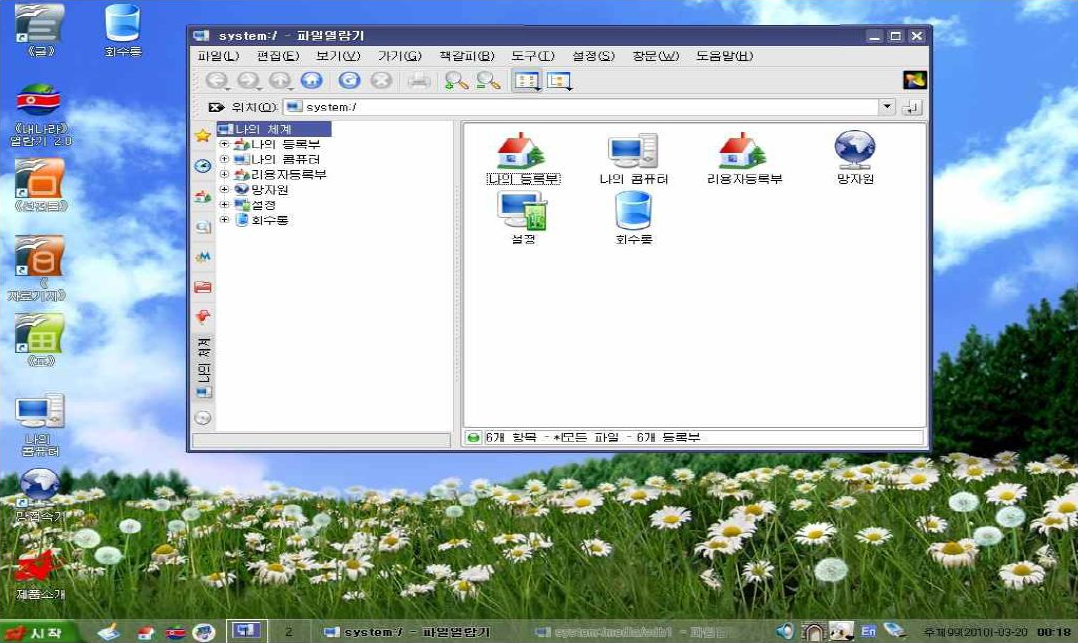
Desktop of Red Star 1.0 and the default file manager

The first version appeared in 2008. It is very reminiscent of the Windows XP operating system, due to the user interface most probably being based on the KDE 3.5 desktop environment, making use of the same exact icon theme and the old Konqueror file manager.

It featured the "Naenara" web browser, based on Mozilla Firefox, and an Office suite based on OpenOffice, called "Uri 2.0". Wine is also included.

One copy has been leaked online. The screenshots of the operating system were officially published by KCNA and discovered by South Korean news sites.

=== Version 2.0 ===
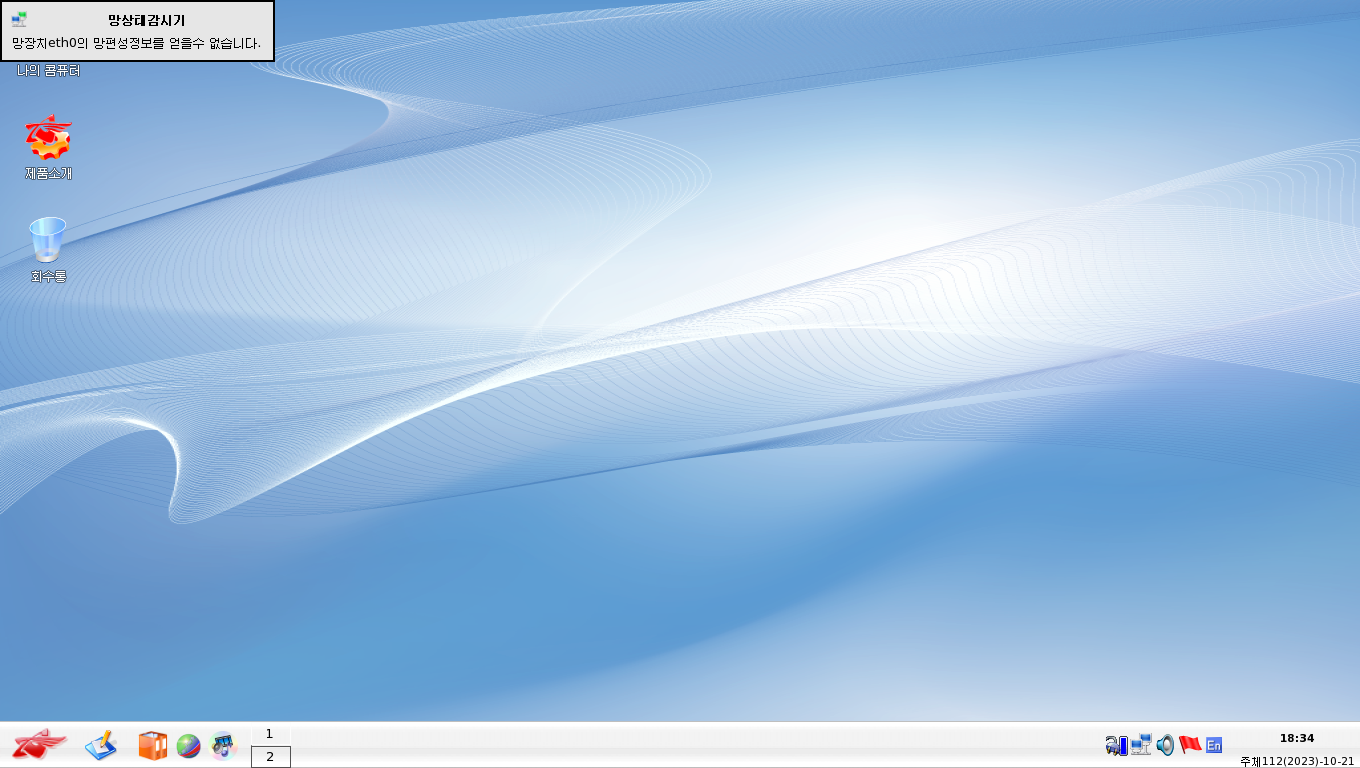
Desktop of Red Star 2.0

The development of version 2.0 began in March 2008, and was completed on 3 June 2009. Like its predecessor, its appearance resembles Windows XP, still based on KDE 3, however opting for the default theme instead of customized looks for the shell. It was priced at 2000 North Korean won (approx. US$15).

The "Naenara" web browser is also included in this version. The browser was released on 6 August 2009, as part of the operating system, and was priced at 4000 North Korean won (approx. US$28).

The operating system uses a special keyboard layout that differs greatly from the South Korean standard layout.

=== Version 3.0 ===
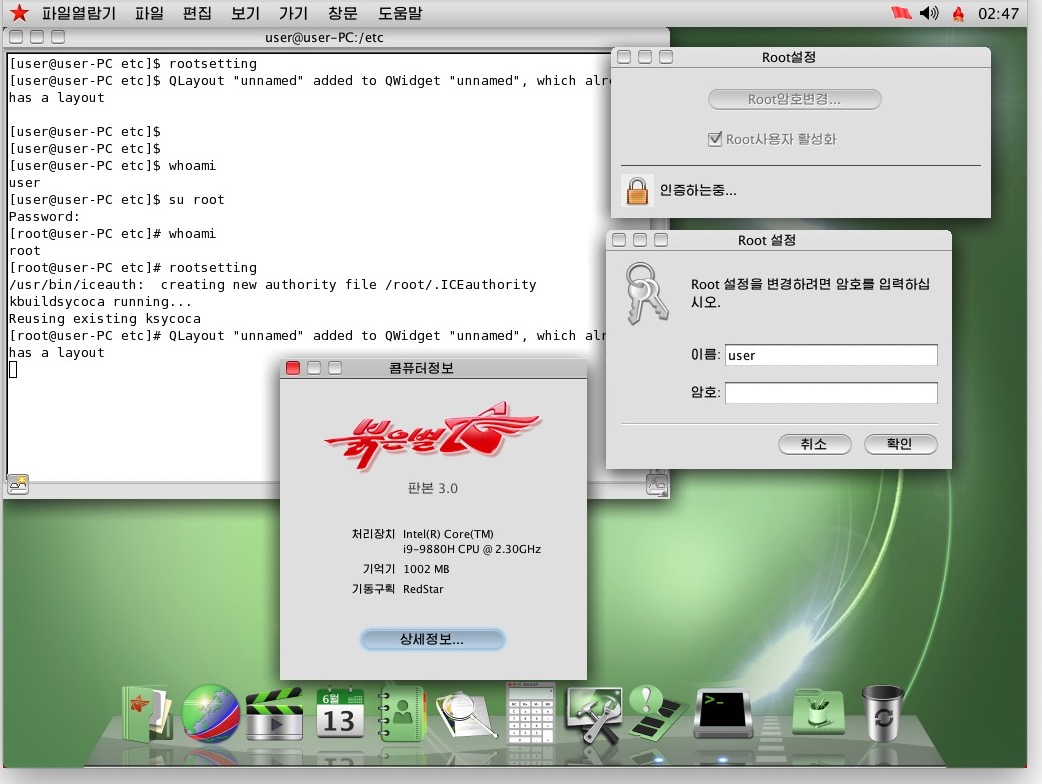
Utility to obtain root privileges in Red Star OS 3

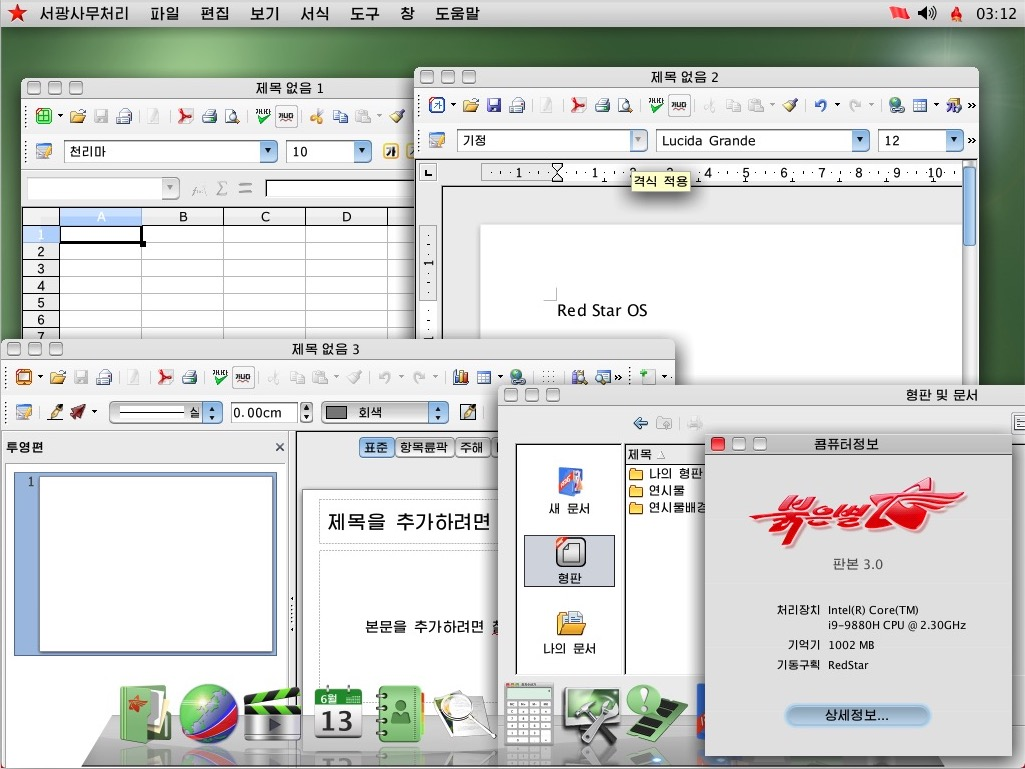
Sogwang office (customized OpenOffice) in Red Star OS 3

Version 3.0 was introduced on 15 April 2012, and its appearance resembles macOS operating systems of various versions. The new version supports both IPv4 and IPv6 addresses.

==== Regulations ====
The operating system comes pre-installed with a number of applications that monitor its users.

If a user tries to disable security functions, an error message will appear on the computer, or the operating system will crash and reboot.

In addition, a watermarking tool integrated into the system marks all media content with the hard drive's serial number, allowing the North Korean authorities to trace the spread of files.

The system also has hidden "antivirus" software that is capable of removing censored files that are remotely stored by the North Korean Secret Service.

There is a user group called "administrator" in the operating system. Users do not have root access by default, but are able to elevate their privileges to root by running a built-in utility called "rootsetting".

However, provisions are made in kernel modules to deny even root users access to certain files, and extensive system integrity checks are done at boot time to ensure these files have not been modified.

The operating system was leaked by Zammis Clark ("SlipStream").

=== Version 4.0 ===
Little information is available on version 4.0.

According to The Pyongyang Times, an official version of Red Star OS 4.0 had been developed by January 2019, with full network support as well as system and service management tools.

In June and July 2020, South Korea's NKEconomy (NK경제) obtained a copy of Red Star OS 4.0 and have published articles about it.

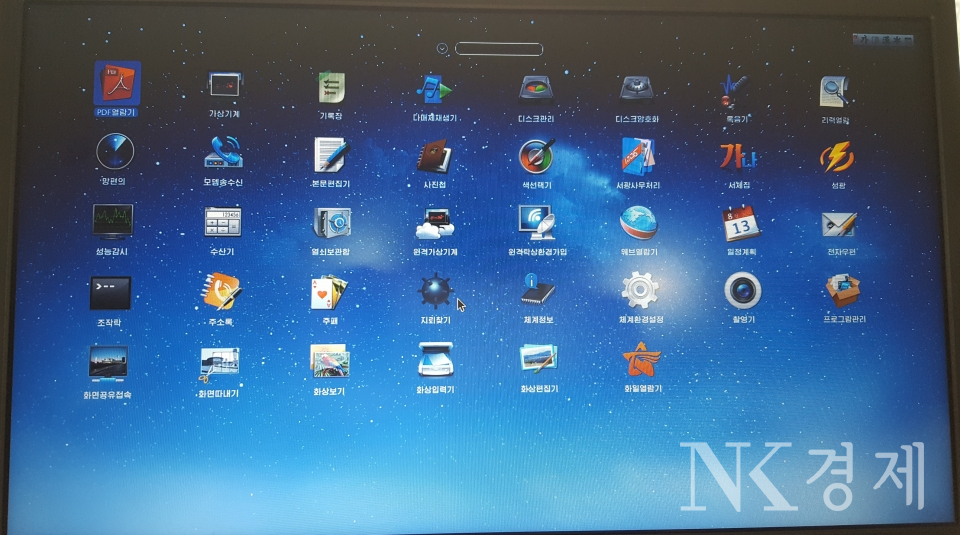
Red Star 4.0 screenshot published by NKEconomy

== Vulnerabilities ==
In 2016, the computer security company Hacker House found a security vulnerability in the integrated web browser Naenara. This vulnerability makes it possible to execute commands on the computer if the user clicks on a crafted link.

== Media attention ==
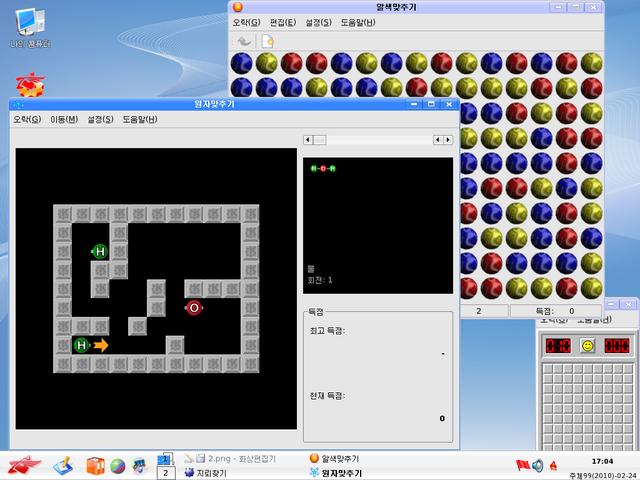
Built-in games in Version 2.0 of Red Star OS, including versions of Atomix and Minesweeper.

The Japan-based North Korea-affiliated newspaper Choson Sinbo interviewed two Red Star OS programmers in June 2006. English-language technology blogs, including Engadget and OSnews, as well as South Korean wire services such as Yonhap, went on to repost the content. In late 2013, Will Scott, who was visiting the Pyongyang University of Science and Technology, purchased a copy of Red Star OS 3.0 from a KCC retailer in southern Pyongyang, and uploaded screenshots of the operating system to the internet.

In 2015, two German researchers speaking at the Chaos Communication Congress described the internal operation of the OS. The system is known to watermark all files on portable media attached to computers in order to aid in tracking the underground market of USB flash drives used to exchange foreign films, music and writing.

== See also ==
- Internet in North Korea
- Telecommunications in North Korea
