= KFLA =

KFLA may refer to:

- KYUL, a radio station (1310 AM) licensed to Scott City, Kansas, United States, which used the call sign KFLA until October 2006
- KFLA-LD, a low-power television station (channel 8) licensed to serve Los Angeles, California, United States
- Korean Federation of Literature and Arts, organization in North Korea
