= Korea Computer Center =

North Korean government information technology research center

Coordinates: 39°01′11″N 125°41′47″E

- Type: State-owned enterprise (since 2015); Research institute (until 2015)
- Industry: Information technology
- Founded: 24 October 1990
- Headquarters: Mangyongdae-guyok, Pyongyang, North Korea
- Area served: North Korea
- Products: Red Star OS
- Owner: Government of North Korea

- Korea Computer Center
- Hangul: 조선콤퓨터중심; 조선콤퓨터쎈터
- Hanja: 朝鮮콤퓨터中心; 朝鮮콤퓨터쎈터
- RR: Joseon kompyuteo jungsim; Joseon kompyuteo ssenteo
- MR: Chosŏn k'omp'yut'ŏ chungsim; Chosŏn k'omp'yut'ŏ ssent'ŏ

The Korea Computer Center (KCC) is a North Korean state-administered information technology research center. It was founded on 24 October 1990. KCC, which administered the .kp country code top-level domain until 2011, employs more than 1,000 people.

KCC operates eight development and production centers, as well as eleven regional information centers. It runs the KCC Information Technology College and its Information Technology Institute. The KCC has branch offices in China, Germany, Syria and the United Arab Emirates. It has an interest in Linux research and started the development of the Red Star OS distribution localised for North Korea.

KCC is a part of the political establishment and not entirely an IT company per se. Its technological state and general modernity are seen as lagging well behind the rest of the world, even with the general zeitgeist in North Korea. For example, the .kp ccTLD was registered in 2007, but KCC did not manage to get a working registry for three years, despite the support of a European company. KCC has still not implemented a working ccTLD infrastructure, something the North Korean government has had as a goal for several years.

While KCC mainly works on projects within North Korea, it has since 2001 served clients in Europe, China, South Korea, Japan, and the Middle East. It operates Naenara, North Korea's official web portal.

KCC has reportedly collaborated with other state entities on cybersecurity and surveillance initiatives.

Nosotek is another North Korean IT venture company that develops computer games; two of them were published by News Corporation. Another such company is the Pyongyang Information Center.

In early 2015, the KCC was reorganized, with all functions not related to the development of Red Star OS being transferred to other entities.

== Structure ==
Korea Computer Center comprises eight research and development centers:

- Odoksan Information Center: Develops Red Star and other Korean language programs, and it adapts Windows for North Korean application.
- Mankyong Information Center: Develops North Korean intranet systems including the national intranet Kwangmyong, the Ministry of State Security intranet Shield, the KPA’s intranet "Goldstar" and the Ministry of Social Safety’s intranet Red Sword.
- Oun Information Center: Develops security programs for organizations that use the North Korean intranets.
- Samilpo Information Center: Develops various personal digital assistance programs such as Uri, Mokran, Hana and Koryopen.
- Chongbyon Information Center: Develops automation for factories.
- Subaeksu Information Center: Develops semiconductors.
- Milyong Information Center, Treatment devices and information technology that will match up with health treatment methodologies.
- Samjiyon Information Center, develops games and multimedia products.

== Products ==
- "Sam heug" search engine
- "Naenara" web browser
- "Chosun Jang-Gi", a computer game
- Kwangmyong, North Korea's closed national intranet
- "Korean Dishes" (Chosŏn ryori), a food-related website
- "Hana", a Korean language input method editor
- "Koryo", English-Korean/Korean-English translation software using an electronic pen
- "Nunbora", a Korean language voice recognition software
- "Pulgunbyol" (Red Star OS), a Linux distribution
- "Cyber Friend", a video conference system
- "Cyber Star", an electronic education system
- "SilverStar Paduk", a Go computer game
- "HMS Player", a media player
- Samjiyon tablet

== See also ==
- Internet in North Korea
- Economy of North Korea
