= 38 North =

Website about North Korea

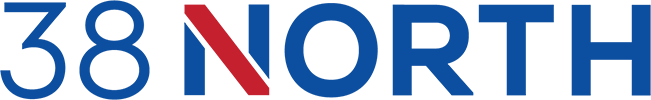
- Site logo
- Website type: Analysis on North Korea
- Available in: English
- Owner: The Stimson Center
- Website: www.38north.org
- Commercial: No
- Registration: No
- Current status: Active

38 North is a website devoted to analysis about North Korea. Its name refers to the 38th parallel north which passes through the Korean Peninsula and from 1945 until the start of the Korean War in 1950 divided the peninsula into North and South Korea. (Note: The 38th parallel north divided the American administered half of the peninsula from the Soviet administered half from 1945 until 1948, when the American administered half became South Korea and the Soviet administered half became North Korea.) Formerly a program of the US-Korea Institute at Johns Hopkins University's Paul H. Nitze School of Advanced International Studies, it is now housed at the Stimson Center and is directed by Senior Fellow Jenny Town. Notable contributors include nuclear scientist Sigfried Hecker, former Associated Press Pyongyang Bureau Chief Jean H. Lee, cybersecurity expert James Andrew Lewis, and North Korea Tech founder Martyn Williams.

== Satellite imagery analysis ==
38 North is an authoritative source of policy and technical analysis regarding North Korea's internal and external affairs. It aims to facilitate an informed public policy debate about peace and security on the Korean Peninsula and provide policymakers, practitioners and other stakeholders with data and insights that may enhance understanding one of the world's most complex security dilemmas. 38 North uses commercial satellite imagery of key areas of interest in North Korea, providing its analysts with the opportunity to uncover insight into developments within the country.

In November 2013, 38 North published a discovery of new construction at a North Korean missile launching site, which the institute said was being upgraded to handle larger rockets.

In January 2016, 38 North reported on North Korea's ballistic missile submarine program, using satellite imagery analysis of Sinpo South Shipyard, following the "ejection" test of a submarine-launched ballistic missile on December 21, 2015. Joseph Bermudez said the imagery was indicative of North Korea's active pursuit of its SLBM program, a prediction that was later supported by four SLBM tests throughout the year on March 16, April 23, July 9, and August 24.

Later in January 2016, 38 North reported suspicious activity at North Korea's Sohae Satellite Launching Station. Satellite imagery analysis by Jack Liu showed low-level activity at key facilities and sites at Sohae. Ten days after the article was published, North Korea conducted its launch of the Unha-4 carrying the Kwangmyongsong-4 satellite at Sohae.

In April 2016, 38 North analysts reported on exhaust plumes from a steam plant at Yongbyon Nuclear Scientific Research Center used to heat the main plant, a possible indicator that reprocessing additional plutonium could be underway. In mid-April, 38 North reported on activity indicating North Korea was beginning to reprocess plutonium for nuclear weapons. The International Atomic Energy Agency did not confirm this until June 7, nearly two months later.

In September 2016, 38 North reported new activity near all three portals at the Punggye-ri Nuclear Test Site, based on satellite imagery analysis conducted by Joseph Bermudez and Jack Liu. The activity indicated that maintenance and minor excavation operations had resumed. The next day, North Korea conducted its fifth nuclear test at Punggye-ri.

38 North has also partnered with the National Geospatial-Intelligence Agency through the Tearline project, producing imagery-based analyses of the country's economy and infrastructure, including a series on the stalled tourism industry.

Since 2025, 38 North has also published a quarterly North Korea Briefing that compiles analysis of political, economic, and military developments.

== See also ==
- Agriculture in North Korea
- China–North Korea relations
- Economy of North Korea
- Human rights in North Korea
- Media coverage of North Korea
- North Korea–South Korea relations
- North Korea–United States relations
