= Naenara (browser) =

Official web browser of North Korea

- Developer: Korea Computer Center
- Release: 2013; 13 years ago (version 3.5)
- Operating system: Red Star OS 2.0, Red Star OS 2.5, Red Star OS 3.0, Windows
- Included with: Red Star OS
- Available in: Korean (Munhwao)
- Type: Internet browser

Naenara is a North Korean intranet web browser software developed by the Korea Computer Center for use of the national Kwangmyong intranet.

== Design ==
Naenara is a modified version of Mozilla Firefox and is distributed with the Linux-based operating system Red Star OS that North Korea developed due to licensing and security issues with Microsoft Windows.

== Usage ==
Naenara can be used to browse approximately 1,000 to 5,500 websites in the national Kwangmyong intranet.

Red Star OS and Naenara were developed by the Korea Computer Center that states on its web page that it seeks to develop Linux-based software for use.

When Naenara is run, it tries to contact an IP address at http://10.76.1.12/. The default search engine for the browser is Google Korea.

== See also ==
- Samjiyon tablet computer
- Internet in North Korea
- Telecommunications in North Korea
