= Pak Chun-hong =

North Korean politician (died c. 2014)

- 박춘홍
- Died: c. January 2014

Pak Chun-hong (Korean: 박춘홍, died c. January 2014) was a North Korean Central Committee of the Workers' Party of Korea politician who was reportedly purged with Jang Song-thaek and his associates.

== Career ==
Pak Chu-hong was an official of the Central Committee of the Workers' Party of Korea. According to South Korean media he had held the post of Deputy Director of the Korean Workers' Party Administration Department. Pak was involved with the Ministry of People's Security. Consequently, he made multiple appearances at leader Kim Jong Un's on-site visits.

Pak was among the closest associates of Jang Song-thaek. For instance, he accompanied Jang on a field guidance tour led by Kim Jong Un. They inspected Okryu Children's Hospital.

== Purge ==
According to a report distributed to overseas diplomatic missions of North Korea, the 16 closest associates of Jang were executed. The list included Pak Chun-hong's name. The report stated that he was executed for showing "disloyalty to First Chairman of the National Defense Commission Kim Jong-un". However, the report had not been independently verified.

Pak was reported to have been purged at the time of Ryang Chong-song's purge, as both were censored from articles available at Uriminzokkiri website.

== See also ==
- Kim Kyong-hui
