= Loxley Pacific =

Loxley PCL is a Thai technology, IT, energy, and trading company.

It was described in 2004 as "one of Thailand's leading telecommunications firms".

Together with the Korean Post and Telecommunications Corporation it forms Star JV, a joint-venture that provides internet connection to North Korea.
