= Korea Copyright Commission =

Korean governmental agency

- 한국저작권위원회
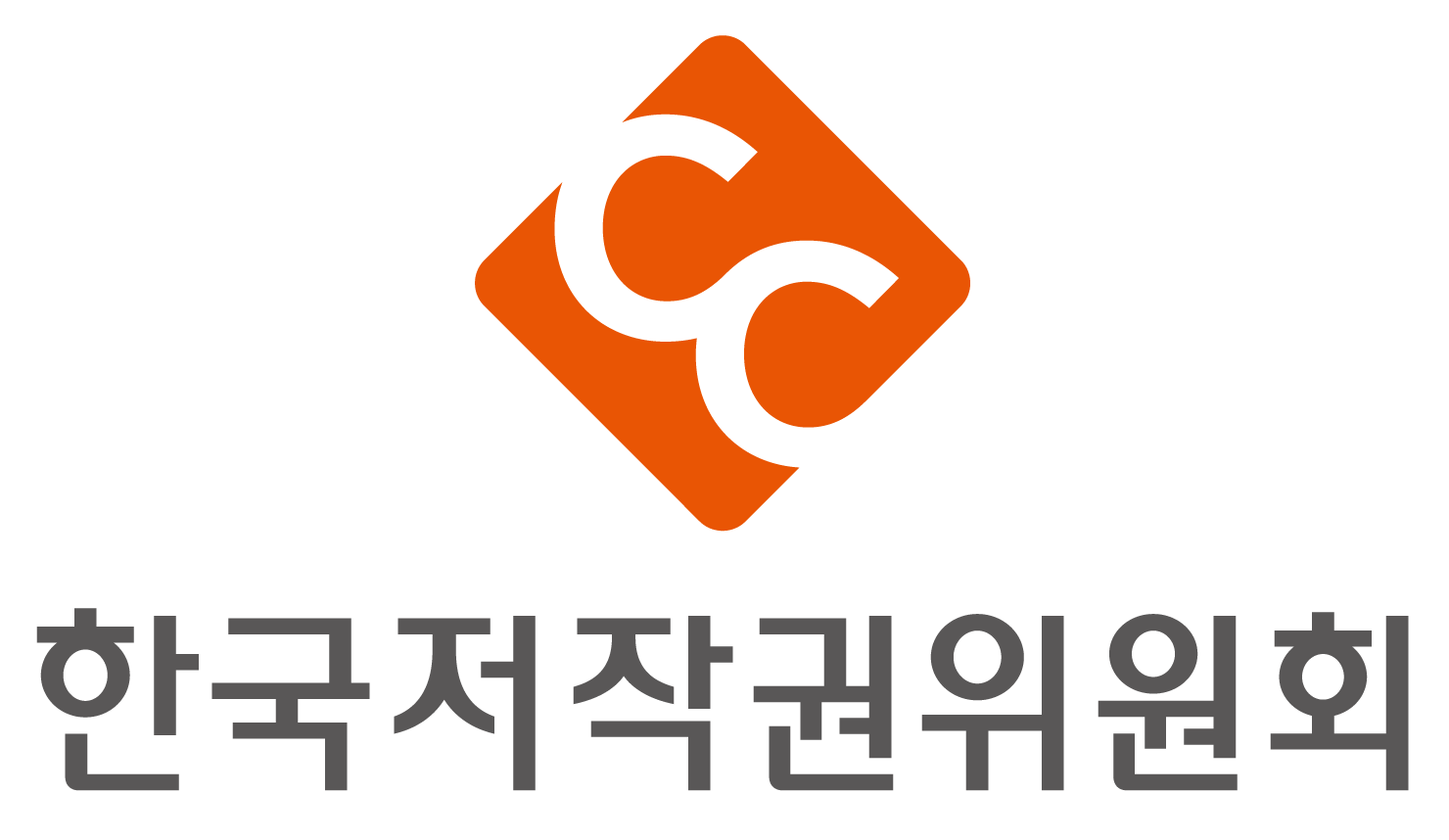

Agency overview
- Formed: 1987; 39 years ago
- Headquarters: Jinju, South Gyeongsang, South Korea
- Parent agency: Ministry of Culture, Sports and Tourism
- Website: www.copyright.or.kr

The Korea Copyright Commission (KCC) Korean agency dedicated to copyright-related affairs representing the government of South Korea. It promotes the legitimate use of works, and development of the copyright industry.

The KCC researches policies and legislations on copyright, deliberates copyright-related issues, mediates copyright disputes, provides copyright education and public awareness programs, and serves as a copyright registration agency.

The KCC copyright dispute moderation role serves as the non-judiciary dispute resolution body while the organization in charge of administering copyright enforcement is the Korea Copyright Protection Agency.

The copyright law in South Korea is regulated by the Copyright Act of 1957 and has been subject to several amendments over the years. In 2009, a new revision of the Act introduced new policy for online copyright infringement including the power to delete illegal copies, notify the copyright infringers, and suspend online access to “repeated” infringers.

In 2012, the KCC launched GongU Madang, a searchable database for works with permissive or expired copyrights.

== See also ==
- United States Copyright Office
