= Foreign Languages Publishing House (North Korea) =

North Korean publisher

Korean name
- Hangul: 외국문출판사
- Hanja: 外國文出版社
- RR: Oegungmun chulpansa
- MR: Oegungmun ch'ulp'ansa

The Foreign Languages Publishing House (FLPH) is the central North Korean publishing bureau of foreign-language documents, located in the Potonggang-guyok of Pyongyang, North Korea. It employs a small group of foreigners to revise translations of North Korean texts so as to make those texts suitable for foreign-language publication. It was founded at December 10, 1949.

The publishing house is under the control of the Propaganda and Agitation Department of the Workers' Party of Korea, which also makes decisions concerning its staff.

Foreign Languages Publishing House maintains the Naenara and Publications of the DPRK web portals, and publishes the periodicals Korea, Korea Today, Foreign Trade of the DPRK, and the newspaper Pyongyang Times.

Foreign Languages Publishing House has a sports team in the Paektusan Prize civil servants games.

== See also ==
- Foreign Languages Publishing House (Soviet Union), Moscow – similar publisher in Soviet Union
- Foreign Languages Press, Beijing – similar publisher in China
- Foreign Languages Publishing House (Vietnam), Hanoi – similar publisher in Vietnam which is now known as Thế Giới Publishers
- Workers' Party of Korea Publishing House
- Progress Publishers – a Soviet printing house which published books and pamphlets in English on a wide range of topics
