= Copyright law of South Korea =

Copyright law of South Korea (Korean: 저작권법) is regulated by the Copyright Act of 1957. It has been amended several times, with a recent 2009 revision introducing a three strikes policy for online copyright infringement.

== History ==
The concept of copyright first appeared in Korean writings in 1884. The history of the Korean copyright law dates to 1908, when during the occupation of Korea, the Japanese copyright law was extended to cover the Korean territories in the form of the international treaty between the United States and Japan on the Protection of Industrial Property in Korea. The Japanese law on copyright was used in Korea until 1957. The major Korean copyright legislation up to date, the Copyright Act of 1957, was enacted on January 28 of that year. This act protected the works for 30 years after the death of the author, and included fair use provisions. Later revisions also addressed issues such as moral rights.

The Act has had 14 amendments, including two consolidations (in 1986 and 2006). The 1986 law extended the length of copyright to 50 years after the author's death, and introduced other modifications, bringing Korean copyright law in line with the Universal Copyright Convention. It also introduced neighboring rights with a 20-year term of protection, which was later extended to 50 years. However, the transitional provisions laid out in the addendum of the 1986 law noted that the new law (and thus its longer term) did not apply to works whose copyright term under the earlier law had already expired. As of 1999, acts of criminal copyright infringement were punishable with a prison term of up to three years and a fine of up to three million won.

The 2009 revision gives the government (represented by the Korean Ministry of Culture, Sports and Tourism and the Korea Copyright Commission) the power to delete illegal reproductions, notify the copyright infringers, and suspend their online access, and is an implementation of the three strikes policy. Article 133bis of the Korean Copyright Act allows the Korean Copyright Commission to request that the ISPs suspend the accounts of repeat file-sharing offenders, as determined by the Commission, for six months, and to upgrade this request to a demand if the Ministry becomes involved; the ISP has to follow the Ministry-backed demand or face a fine. However, user email accounts are not to be suspended.

In 2011, the copyright law was controversially changed as a precondition to the United States–Korea Free Trade Agreement. The changes introduced the concept of fair use, in order to place a limit on exceptions to copyright. It also extended the copyright terms from 50 years to 70 years, which was implemented in 2013.

In general, copyright legislation in Korea has grown increasingly restrictive. In the 1950s, the public opinion in Korea did not consider acts such as copying a book to be equivalent to stealing. The 1957 act was very rarely implemented, and it was only after the revisions of 1986 that this changed. Since then, the Korean law has been amended numerous times to protect the interests of various industries creating copyrighted works and bring Korean copyright law more in line with the international standards, such as those of the WIPO. The number of copyright cases and rulings has grown significantly since 1986. Kyu Ho Youm noted that since the 1980s, copyright law has been transformed "from a largely ignored legal notion to a hotly debated concept in and out of court".

While the Korean copyright law has some unique characteristics, it has heavily drawn from foreign examples—particularly those of the United States.

Freedom of panorama in Korea is limited with regard to works of art in public places which cannot be distributed for commercial purposes.

== Collective rights management ==
Collective management organizations (CMOs) or copyright collecting societies in South Korea are regulated by the Ministry of Culture, Sports and Tourism. As of 2015, 13 organizations have been approved by MCST to provide copyright trust services in South Korea:

- Musical works, performances, and phonograms:
  - Korea Music Copyright Association (KOMCA)
  - Korean Society of Composers, Authors and Publishers (KOSCAP)
  - Federation of Korean Music Performers (FKMP)
  - Recording Industry Association of Korea (RIAK)
- Cinematographic works:
  - Movie Distributors Association of Korea
  - Korean Film Producers Association
- Broadcasting
  - Korea Broadcasting Performers Association
- Literary works:
  - Korean Society of Authors
  - Korean TV & Radio Writers Association
  - Korea Reproduction and Transmission Rights Association
  - Korea Scenario Writers Association
- News:
  - Korea Press Foundation
- Public works (works produced by government agencies and public institutions):
  - Korea Cultural Information Service Agency

== Criticism ==
The 2009 law has generated a number of criticisms, including from organizations such as the Electronic Frontier Foundation. The critics argue that the current copyright law gives too much power to the copyright holders, which can hurt Korean competitiveness and culture, and de facto limits the freedom of expression and thus boosts Internet censorship in South Korea. Hundreds of Korean Internet users have been disconnected from the Internet after not three, but one strike; "half of those suspended were involved in infringement of material that would cost less than 90 U.S. cents". In March 2013 Korea's National Human Rights Commission recommended a reexamination of the 2009 law, noting that its benefits are poorly documented, while it poses serious concerns to the issues related to cultural expression and human rights.

== See also ==
- Law of South Korea
- Soribada
