= GongU Madang =

South Korean copyright search engine

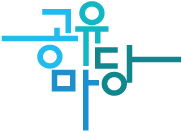
- Native name: 공유마당
- Website type: Database
- Available in: Korean
- Country of origin: South Korea
- Owner: Korea Copyright Commission
- Services: Free works with permissive or expired copyright
- Website: gongu.copyright.or.kr/gongu/main/main.do (in Korean)
- Commercial: no
- Launched: December 2012

GongU Madang (Korean: 공유마당; lit. 'place for sharing') is a South Korean searchable database of digital items with either permissive or expired copyright. It is operated by the Korea Copyright Commission (KCC). It was established in December 2012, succeeding a predecessor that focused mainly on works with expired copyright that was established in either 2006 or 2007.

The works are available under various licenses, including the Korea Open Government License and various Creative Commons Licenses. Depending on the license, works can be used commercially or non-commercially. The website offers digital materials of a number of categories, including images, music, fonts, videos, and text. By December 2016, it had 432,383 photos, 44,472 texts, 136,585 artistic works, 3,282 musical works, and 624 videos. By 2020, there were 122 fonts on the site. It also offers a number of other materials, including PowerPoint templates and computer and mobile phone wallpapers. It received around 10,000 downloads across its materials in early 2007. In 2016, the total downloads were 2.81 million, with 9.68 million through its entire history. The website had a significant renovation in 2022. Searching the database also yields results from other databases as well.

The KCC has expressed the view that the platform is useful for schools and small businesses in Korea, and has taken steps to acquire or create materials especially for these groups. Examples of such materials include clip art and fonts for signs and menus. Reading materials were donated by companies such as Kyobo Book Centre. Some of the materials in the database were acquired by the KCC through negotiations or donations from various organizations and photographers. Some items were donated by famous artists. Some items are seasonal, such as Christmas jingles. Materials from the database have been used as training data for AI models.
