= Manmulsang =

North Korean e-commerce website

- Native name: 만물상
- Available in: Korean
- Founded: 2015
- Headquarters: Nangnang-guyŏk, Pyongyang
- Country of origin: North Korea
- Area served: North Korea
- Owner: Yeonpung Commercial Information Tech Company
- Founder: Park Hyok
- Website: http://www.manmulsang.com.kp/index.php/manmulsang?lang=en
- Commercial: Yes
- Registration: Required
- Users: ≈40,000 (2017)

Manmulsang (Korean: 만물상) is a North Korean e-commerce website. The name Manmulsang translates to "shop with ten thousand items." It provides commercial services accessible through the national computer network and mobile communications.

The website functions as an online shopping platform for North Korean businesspeople, allowing them to upload product information and communicate directly with buyers. It also offers economic information intended to assist users. The website's interface is reported to resemble Microsoft Windows 8, while its search bar design is similar to that of Naver. The platform is primarily designed for PC users.

== History ==
The exact launch date of Manmulsang is not known, but it is believed to have been introduced either in October 2015 or January 2016.

The platform was initially launched by the Yeonpung Commercial Information Tech Company as a business-to-business service. At the time, it provided payment and transportation services, along with a card payment system. The state-run portal Naenara also reported that a mobile application was available.

By December 2016, the website had accumulated more than 3.2 million visits since its launch. It had 15,719 registered intranet users and 442 registered mobile users. A total of 3,188,324 visits were recorded via intranet access, and 110,127 through mobile access. Reports also indicated that around 300 companies were registered on the platform. The mobile application is believed to have been introduced in early 2016, although the exact date remains unclear.

In 2017, Choson Sinbo reported that Manmulsang had expanded delivery services nationwide. The platform was described as one of the most successful North Korean e-commerce sites at the time, with about 40,000 subscribers and an average of 50,000 daily visitors.

As of April 2018, more than 39,000 products were listed on the site, which reportedly received over 60,000 daily visits.

In 2019, Rodong Sinmun reported that Manmulsang had introduced new features, including an online flight ticket booking service, and described the platform as widely used. The site reportedly had 21.6 million cumulative visits that year.

On July 4, 2023, a KCTV broadcast revealed that Manmulsang was selling self-branded smartphones. The program showed a model featuring a circular rear camera cluster and a biometric scanner, with the Manmulsang brand name displayed on the back of the device.

In December 2023, Manmulsang introduced a requirement for users to obtain electronic certificates when making digital payments. The measure was described as a security feature intended to verify user authenticity.
