= Internet censorship in South Korea =

Internet censorship in South Korea is prevalent, and contains some unique elements such as the blocking of pro-North Korea websites, and to a lesser extent, Japanese websites, which led to it being categorized as "pervasive" in the conflict/security area by OpenNet Initiative. South Korea, like China, blocks many pornographic websites, and is one of the few developed countries where pornography is largely illegal. Any and all material deemed "harmful" or subversive by the state is censored. The country also has a "cyber defamation law", which allow the police to crack down on comments deemed "hateful" without any reports from victims, with citizens being sentenced for such offenses.

From 1995 to 2002, the government of South Korea passed the Telecommunications Business Act (TBA), the first internet censorship law in the world. Passing of the act led to the establishment of the Internet Communications Ethics Committee (ICEC), which would monitor the Internet and make recommendations for content to be removed. The ICEC pursued criminal prosecutions of those who made unlawful statements and blocked several foreign websites. In the first eight months of 1996, the ICEC took down roughly 220,000 messages on Internet sites.

From 2002 to 2008, the government passed a revision of the TBA legislation. This allowed the ICEC to engage in more sophisticated internet policing and other bureaucratic entities to monitor the Internet for illegal speech or take down websites that violated the laws. During this time, there was political drive to increase extensive internet censorship, in part as a response to cases of suicide associated with online rumors. In 2007, over 200,000 incidents of cyberbullying were reported.

In 2008, the election of President Lee Myung-bak was followed by the inauguration of major increases in broadcast censorship. The South Korean government passed a law that created a new agency called the Korea Communications Standards Commission (KCSC) to replace the ICEC, becoming the new South Korean Internet regulation and censorship body. The first major change by the Lee Myung-bak government was to require websites with over 100,000 daily visitors to make their users register their real name and social security numbers. A second change made by the government was to allow KCSC to suspend or delete any web posting or articles for 30 days as soon as a complaint is filed. The reason for the new law was to combat cyberbullying in South Korea. Every week, portions of the South Korean web are taken down by the KCSC. In 2013, around 23,000 South Korean webpages were deleted and another 63,000 blocked by the KCSC.

South Korea's government maintains a broad-ranging approach toward the regulation of specific online content and imposes a substantial level of censorship on election-related discourse and on many websites that the government deems subversive or socially harmful. Such policies are particularly pronounced with regard to anonymity on the Internet. The OpenNet Initiative classifies Internet censorship in South Korea as pervasive in the conflict/security area, as selective in the social area, with fewer evidence of filtering in the political and Internet tools areas. In 2011 South Korea was included on Reporters Without Borders list of countries Under Surveillance. This designation persisted in 2012, shared with Russia and Egypt among other countries. Freedom House has also reported that online harassment, particularly newer, digitally mediated forms of violence against women has continued.

In 2019, the South Korean government announced that it would use SNI snooping to censor HTTPS websites. This was met with strong opposition, with more than 230,000 South Korean citizens signing a petition to protest the measure, but the opposition was disregarded by the government. The South Korean government defended its decision by stating that the Korea Communications Standards Commission was an independent commission, a claim which turned out to be false, as most members of the commission were appointed by the president of the country.

== Relevant laws ==
During the military dictatorships of Park Chung-hee and Chun Doo-hwan (1961–1987), anti-government speech was frequently suppressed with reference to the National Security Act (NSA, 1948) and the Basic Press Law (1980). Although the Basic Press Law was abolished in 1987, the NSA remains in effect. The government has used other "dictatorship-era" laws in order to prosecute critics in contemporary contexts; for example a law against the spreading of "false rumors" was used to charge a teenage protester during the 2008 US beef protest in South Korea.

According to the Telecommunication Business Law, three government agencies in South Korea have responsibility for Internet surveillance and censorship: the Broadcasting Regulation Committee, the Korea Media Rating Board, and the Korea Internet Safety Commission (KISCOM, 2005). KISCOM censors the Internet through orders to internet service providers to block access to "subversive communication", "materials harmful to minors", "cyber defamation", "sexual violence", "cyber stalking", and "pornography and nudity". Regulators have blocked or removed 15,000 Internet posts in 2008, and over 53,000 in 2011.

In April 2020, the national assembly passed a bill to handle the culprits of digital sex crimes. According to the bill, those who purchase, sell or watch media graphics of non-consensual sexual activity will be jailed for up to 3 years or fined up to 3 million Won (US$2,600).

== Political censorship ==
Freedom to criticize government leaders, policies, and the military is limited to the extent that it "endangers national security" or is considered by censors to be "cyber defamation". The government has cited "character assassinations and suicides caused by excessive insults, [and] the spreading of false rumors and defamation" to justify its censorship.

In May 2002, KISCOM shut down the anti-conscription website non-serviam on the grounds that it "denied the legitimacy" of the South Korean military. The Navy of South Korea accused an activist of criminal libel when he criticized plans to build a controversial naval base in the country.

The government has deleted the Twitter account of a user who cursed the president, and a judge who wrote critically about the president's Internet censorship policies was fired. In 2010, the Prime Minister's Office authorized surveillance on a civilian who satirized President Lee Myung-bak.

In 2007, numerous bloggers were censored and their posts deleted by police for expressing criticism of, or support for, presidential candidates. This led to some bloggers being arrested by the police. Subsequently, in 2008, just before a new presidential election, new legislation that required all major Internet portal sites to require identity verification of their users was put into effect. This applies to all users who add any publicly viewable content. For example, to post a comment on a news article, a user registration and citizen identity number verification is required. For foreigners who do not have such numbers, a copy of passport must be faxed and verified. Although this law was initially met with public outcry, as of 2008, most of the major portals, including Daum, Naver, Nate, and Yahoo Korea, enforce such verification before the user can post any material that is publicly viewable. YouTube refused to conform to the law, instead opting to disable the commenting feature on its Korean site.

=== Discussion about North Korea ===
South Korea has banned at least 65 sites considered sympathetic to North Korea through the use of IP blocking. Most North Korean websites are hosted overseas in the United States, Japan and China. Critics say that the only practical way of blocking a webpage is by denying its IP address, and since many of the North Korean sites are hosted on large servers together with hundreds of other sites, the number of real blocked pages increases significantly. Estimates are that over 3,000 additional webpages are rendered inaccessible.

In September 2004, North Korea launched the website of Kim Il-sung Open University, Our Nation School. Three days later, Internet providers in South Korea were ordered by the National Police Agency, National Intelligence Service (NIS) and the Ministry of Information and Communication (MIC) to block connections to the site, as well as more than 30 others, including Minjok Tongshin, Choson Sinbo, Chosun Music, North Korea Info Bank, DPRK Stamp and Uriminzokkiri.

In September 2007, Democratic Labor Party activist Kim Kang-pil was sentenced to one year in prison for discussing North Korea on the party's website.

In 2008, five South Koreans were arrested for distributing pro-North material online.

In August 2010, the South Korean government blocked a Twitter account operated by the North.

In January 2011, a South Korean man was arrested for praising North Korea through social networking sites. That same year another South Korean was arrested for posting 300 messages and 6 videos of pro-North content and sentenced to 10 months in jail. A further 83 South Koreans were arrested for distributing pro-North material on the Internet.

In January 2012, a South Korean freedom-of-speech activist was arrested for reblogging a post from a North Korean Twitter account.

South Korean president Lee Myung-bak's 2011 policies included cracking down on pro-North Korean comments on social network sites like Facebook and Twitter. Reporters Without Borders noted that the government "[had] intensified" its campaign to censor pro-North Korea material in 2012 as well.

In 2018, a South Korean man was arrested for demanding abolishment of the National Security Law and praising North Korea. He was sentenced to one year in prison.

== Nudity and obscenity ==
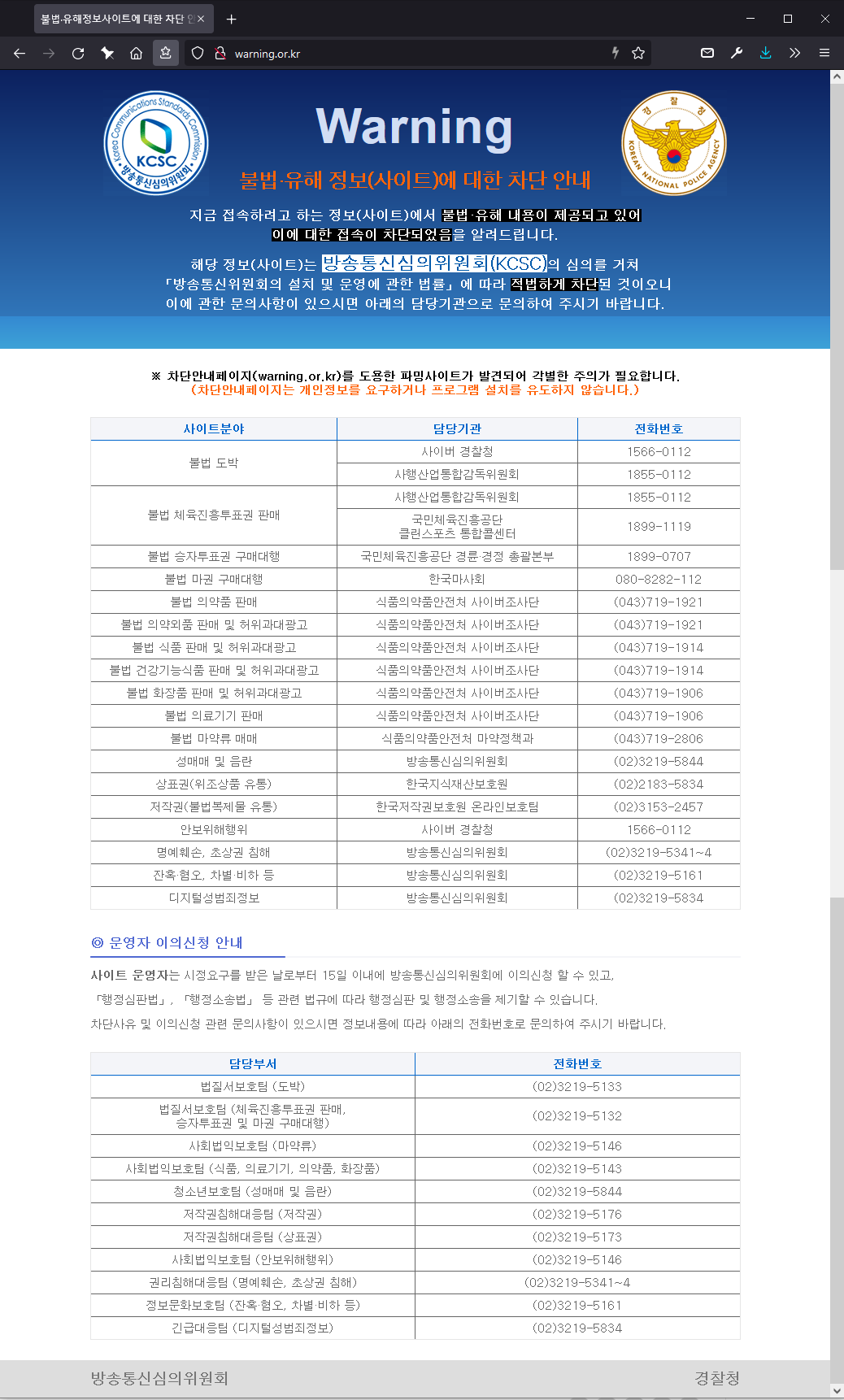
Screenshot of the warning shown to users when accessing blocked websites

The Government of South Korea practiced censorship of gay-content websites from 2001 to 2003, through its Information and Communications Ethics Committee (Korean: 정보통신윤리위원회), an official organ of the Ministry of Information and Communication, under its category of "obscenity and perversion"; for example, it shut down the website ex-zone, a website about gay and lesbian issues, in 2001. That practice has since been reversed.

Since 2008, attempts by anybody to access "indecent Internet sites" featuring unrated games, pornography, gambling, etc., are automatically redirected to a warning page which states "This site is legally blocked by the government regulations."

Search engines are required to verify age for some keywords deemed inappropriate for minors. For such keywords, age verification using a national identity number is required. For foreigners, a copy of their passport must be faxed for age verification. As of 2008, practically all large search engine companies in South Korea, including foreign-owned companies (e.g. Yahoo! Korea), have complied with this legislation. In April 2009, when the Communication Commission ordered user verification be implemented at YouTube, Google Korea blocked video uploading from users whose country setting is Korean. In September 2012, Google re-enabled YouTube uploads in Korea.

On December 21, 2010, the Korea Communications Commission announced that it planned to create guidelines about monitoring Internet content in case of a tense political situation, such as automatically deleting any online anti-government message.

South Korea's authority still blocks sites related to nudity or obscenity, including porn-sites. This is despite the fact that under South Korean law, purchasing, possessing, or viewing pornography is not illegal, unless the video or image was filmed or distributed without the consent of persons depicted, or contains minors. There is criticism that sites that only deal with pornography that is filmed, produced, and distributed with voluntary consent, and even sites that only deal with cartoon pornography featuring only characters who are 19 or older, or who appear to be such, are subject to blanket blocking.

== Criticism ==
The 2009 modification of the copyright law of South Korea introducing the three strikes policy has generated criticism, including regarding Internet freedoms and censorship. Tens of thousands of Korean Internet users have been disconnected from the Internet after not three, but one strike.

On September 6, 2011, the Electronic Frontier Foundation criticized the Korea Communications Standards Commission for proposing censorship and restriction on the blog of an Internet free speech activist Gyeong-sin Park. The United Nations Human Rights Council's Special Rapporteur on Freedom of Expression warned South Korea's government about its censorship, noting among other things that South Korea's defamation laws are often used to punish statements "that are true and are in the public interest".

Korean officials' rhetoric about censored material, including that it is "subversive", "illegal", "harmful" or related to "pornography and nudity", has been noted as similar to that of their Chinese counterparts. Critics also say that the government takes prohibitions on profanity as "a convenient excuse to silence critics" and chill speech.

South Korean conservative media outlets loyal to the Lee Myung-bak government are accused of advocating further Internet censorship, because the Internet is the main source of information for progressive South Korean youths.

Some argue in South Korea that blocking porn-sites is inevitable, as most countries lack an adult verification system unlike South Korea. However, the United Kingdom's Online Safety Act 2023 refutes this. The United Kingdom has a policy of blocking porn sites by default, but allows those who pass age verification to have their access lifted. Even this was met with strong opposition from the civil society of the United Kingdom. In contrast, South Korea is enforcing a blanket blocking policy, which is violating the sexual freedom of adults. It has been criticized as a similar idea to the "Confucian Taliban" (유교 탈레반, Yugyo talleban).

== Comparison with China ==
Like China, South Korea blocks pornographic and similar websites, which has been the subject of criticism. Some argue that internet censorship in South Korea is no different from the internet censorship in China. But the level of internet censorship in South Korea is lighter than that of China.

While China regulates even VPNs and other means of circumvention, South Korea does not. In 2017, the Chinese government effectively outlawed VPNs, which allow for bypassing internet blocks. Under the measures of the Chinese government, services such as VPNs are prohibited from providing overseas internet access without approval from telecommunications authorities. South Korea's political internet censorship is limited to propaganda spread by, or domestic support for, North Korea. Major sites that are blocked in China, but not in South Korea, include Google, Facebook, Twitter, and YouTube. Additionally, unlike China, South Korea does not block American and European media outlets.

Although the production and distribution of pornography (for distribution purposes) are prohibited in South Korea and China, the scope of permitted erotic creative works in South Korea is wider than in China. Since the 2010s, regulations have been relaxed in South Korea, and erotic works (including those that directly depict sexual acts) that were previously illegal have been legally classified as "harmful media for youth" (청소년유해매체물), primarily in the form of webtoons, subject to mandatory age verification. Of course, there are restrictions, so the genitals cannot be exposed (and cannot be blurred).

Furthermore, legal penalties for distributing pornography are more lenient in South Korea. In South Korea, the statutory penalty for producing or distributing sexual videos or images is a prison sentence of up to 1 year or a fine of up to 10 million won, unless the video or images were produced without consent or involve minors. This is pursuant to Article 44-7 of the "Act on Promotion of Information and Communications Network Untilization and Information Protection" (정보통신망 이용촉진 및 정보보호 등에 관한 법률) and Article 74 of the same Act. The actual application of the law is also lenient. As of the 2020s, there have been no cases of imprisonment. As of 2023, there have been cases of fines.

Conversely, China is stricter on punishment than South Korea. According to relevant provisions of the China's Criminal Code, the basic penalty is imprisonment of up to 3 years or a fine, and in serious cases, imprisonment of at least 3 years and up to 10 years is possible. This policy led to the indictment of animator Shirakami, who created cartoon pornography featuring characters from Final Fantasy VII and Genshin Impact, by Chinese police, and many Chinese artists have ceased their activities. In June 2024, China's authority arrested dozen of adult web novel writers for writing on the adult web novel platform in Taiwan. Only some paid hefty fines, while others were sentenced to prison terms.

== See also ==
- Censorship in South Korea
- Censorship of Japanese media in South Korea
- Copyright law of South Korea
- Cyber defamation law § South Korea
- Restrictions on geographic data in South Korea
- Smart Sheriff, a South Korean parental monitoring mobile application.
- Web compatibility issues in South Korea
