= Pyongyang Sinmun =

North Korean newspaper

- Type: Daily newspaper
- Founder: Kim Il Sung
- Publisher: Workers' Party of Korea Pyongyang Municipal Committee
- Editor-in-chief: Song Rak-gyun
- Launched: 1 June 1957
- Language: Korean
- City: Pyongyang
- Country: North Korea
- Circulation: 4.3 million (as of 2002)
- Sister newspapers: The Pyongyang Times

Pyongyang Sinmun (Korean: 평양신문; Hancha: 平壤新聞, Pyongyang News) is a North Korean newspaper founded on 1 June 1957 by Kim Il Sung. It launched an online version on 1 January 2005. It is published by the Workers' Party of Korea Pyongyang Municipal Committee six times per week under the editorship of Song Rak-gyun. Although technically a local newspaper, it is distributed nationwide and stories cover news from other regions as well. The print is four pages. It has a circulation of 4.3 million. The Pyongyang Times is its foreign language edition.

== See also ==
- List of newspapers in North Korea
- Media of North Korea
