= Ministry of External Economic Relations =

Foreign trade ministry of North Korea

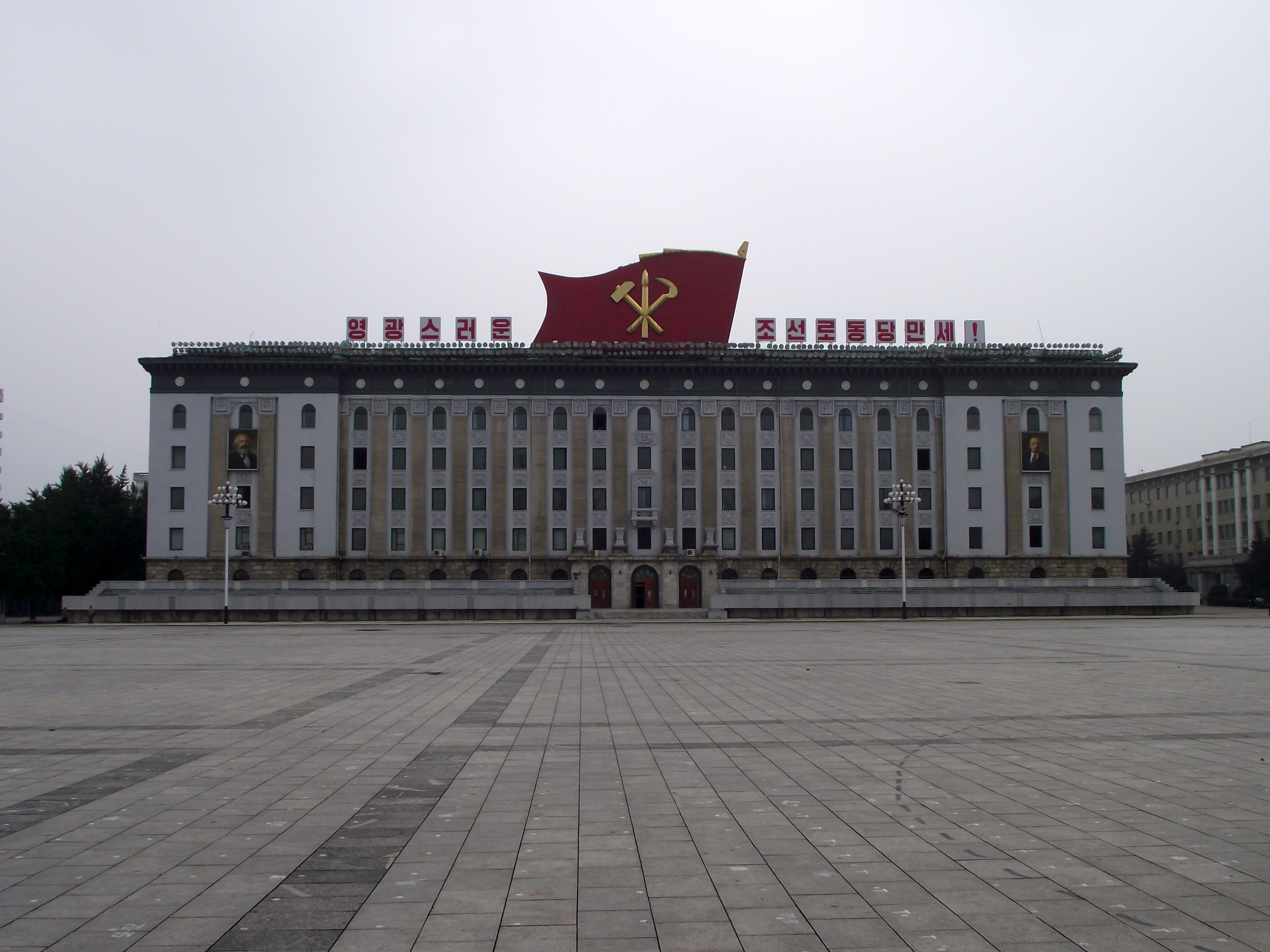
- Ministry of External Economic Relations on Kim Il Sung Square

Agency overview
- Formed: September 1998; 27 years ago
- Preceding agency: Ministry of Foreign Trade
- Jurisdiction: North Korea
- Headquarters: Kim Il Sung Square, Pyongyang; 39°01′07″N 125°45′08″E
- Minister responsible: Kim Yong-jae, Minister of External Economic Relations
- Deputy Minister responsible: O Ryong-chol, Vice Minister of External Economic Relations
- Parent agency: Cabinet of North Korea
- Website: www.kftrade.com.kp

Korean name
- Hangul: 대외경제성
- Hanja: 對外經濟省
- RR: Daeoe gyeongjeseong
- MR: Taeoe kyŏngjesŏng

The Ministry of External Economic Relations is North Korea's foreign trade ministry. The ministry's headquarters are at Kim Il Sung Square in Pyongyang. The current minister is Kim Yong-jae and the vice minister O Ryong-chol. The ministry was established in 2014 when its predecessor, the Ministry of Foreign Trade, fused with the Joint Venture Investment Committee and the State Economic Development Commission to revive the ministry that had been marred by economic sanctions against North Korea.

== History ==
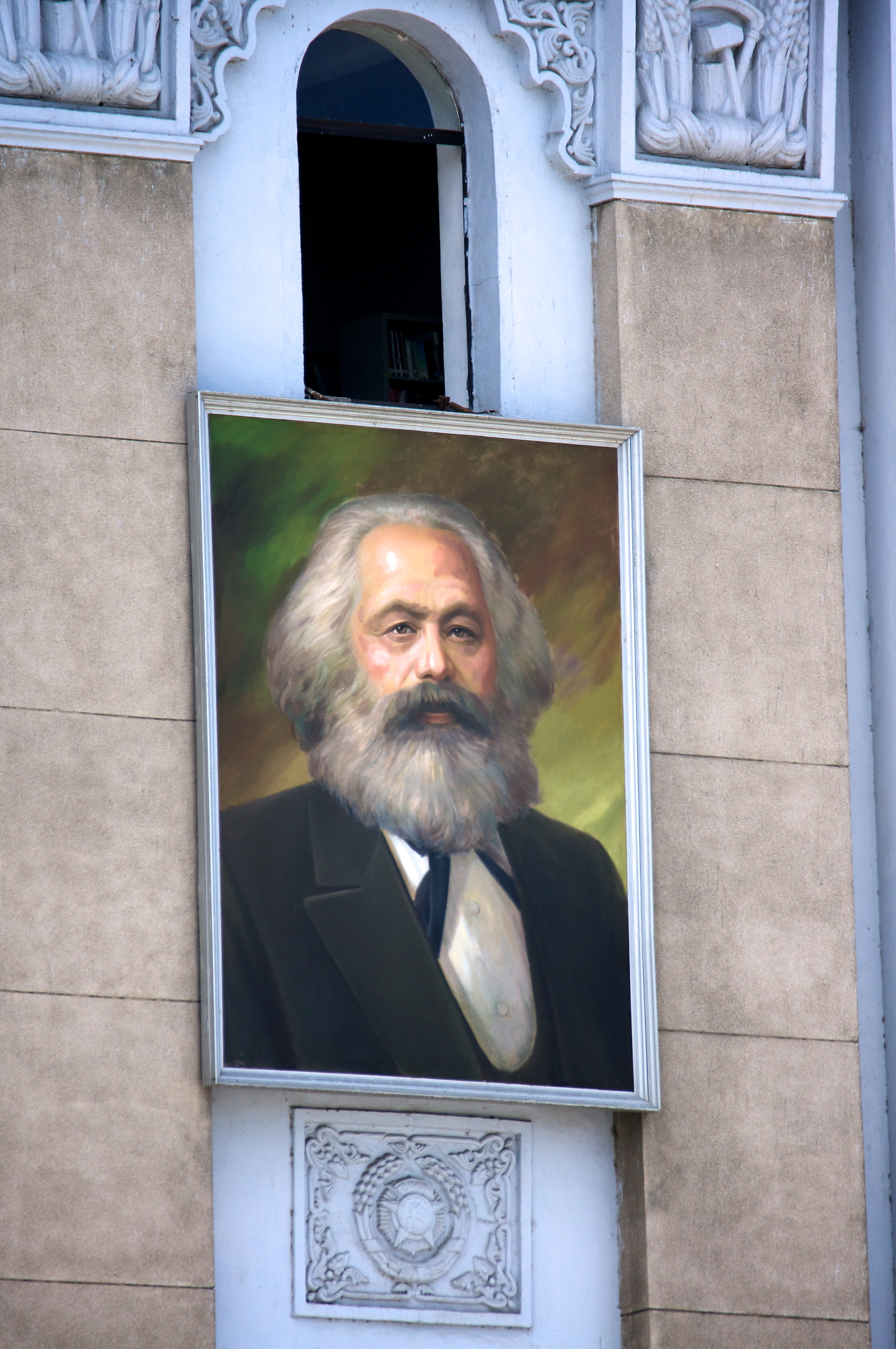
Portrait of Karl Marx was on the facade of the ministry until 2012 and reinstated in 2024.

The Ministry of Foreign Trade was newly established in September 1998 following the adoption of the new 1998 "Kim Il Sung Constitution". It initially oversaw all international economic activities. Some of its tasks were delegated to two organizations founded in 2010 and 2013, respectively: The Joint Venture Investment Committee (JVIC) was established to handle foreign investment and the State Economic Development Commission (SEDC) to manage the Special Economic Zones of North Korea. Gradually, because of sanctions against North Korea, the Foreign Trade Ministry became inoperable. Between 2008 and 2016 Ri Ryong-nam served as the minister.

In 2012, prominent portraits of Karl Marx and Vladimir Lenin were removed from the facade of the ministry on Kim Il Sung Square in Pyongyang, which observers took for indirect signs of change brought about by the leadership of Kim Jong Un.

The present ministry was created on 8 June 2014 when the Ministry of Foreign Trade fused with the JVIC, and SEDC. All three constituent organizations had been affiliates in the Cabinet of North Korea. It is likely that they had much overlap in their tasks. According to the Institute for Far Eastern Studies: "the creation of this new Cabinet-affiliated ministry can be interpreted as an attempt to reach a breakthrough in North Korea's stagnating international economic cooperation ... a measure taken to increase the efficiency of decision-making and implementation of foreign trade-related issues, and to put an end to the confusion and inefficient inter-competition that arose out of the creation of these additional agencies".

The ministry opened a website in October 2018. According to Martyn Wililams of North Korea Tech, the website came "at an interesting time as Kim Jong Un has pegged economic development as a major goal for the country, as South Korean companies are weighing projects that could help relations between the two Koreas but as the international community has some of the strictest sanctions ever on the country".

== See also ==
- Economy of North Korea
- Foreign Trade Bank of the Democratic People's Republic of Korea
- Foreign Trade of the DPRK – magazine
- Minister of Foreign Affairs (North Korea)
