= Kim Yong-jae =

North Korean diplomat and politician (born 1952)

Minister of External Economic Relations

14th term
- In office 11 April 2019 – 18 January 2021
- President: Kim Jong Un
- Premier: Kim Tok-hun; Kim Jae-ryong
- Preceded by: Ri Ryong-nam
- Succeeded by: Yun Jong-ho

North Korean Ambassador to Russia
- Incumbent
- Assumed office 2019
- Preceded by: Kim Hyong-jun

Personal details
- Born: 7 September 1952 (age 73) Kangwon Province, North Korea

Korean name
- Hangul: 김영재
- Hanja: 金英宰
- RR: Gim Yeongjae
- MR: Kim Yŏngjae

Kim Yong-jae (Korean pronunciation: [ki.mjʌŋ.dzɛ] or [kim] [jʌŋ.dzɛ]; born 7 September 1952) is a North Korean diplomat and politician. He was the Ambassador Extraordinary and Plenipotentiary of North Korea to the Russian Federation. He is currently the North Korean Minister of External Economic Relations.

== See also ==
- Embassy of North Korea in Moscow
