= Anti-Imperialist National Democratic Front =

Pro-North Korea organization in South Korea

Anti-Imperialist National Democratic Front 반제민족민주전선
- Founder: Kim Jong-tae; Choi Yong-do
- Founded: 25 August 1969; 57 years ago
- Dissolved: 2005; 21 years ago (de facto)
- Headquarters: Pyongyang (de facto); Seoul (de jure)
- Ideology: Communism; Kimilsungism–Kimjongilism; Juche; Songun; Korean reunification
- Political position: Far-left

- Anti-Imperialist National Democratic Front
- Hangul: 반제민족민주전선
- Hanja: 反帝民族民主戰線
- RR: Banje minjok minjujeonseon
- MR: Panje minjok minjujŏnsŏn

The Anti-Imperialist National Democratic Front (AINDF; Korean: 반제민족민주전선) was a banned united front organization in South Korea.

The AINDF is guided by Juche, the official state ideology of North Korea, and aims to carry out a popular revolution in South Korea, achieve independence by removing the United States Forces Korea, and hasten the reunification of the country. The AINDF is identical in organization to the Democratic Front for the Reunification of Korea, the de jure united front of North Korea, and has missions in the North Korean capital of Pyongyang (the only ostensibly South Korean organization to) and another in Japan.

The AINDF is banned in South Korea under the National Security Law as a spy group for the Workers' Party of Korea, the ruling party of North Korea.

== History ==
The Revolutionary Party for Reunification (통일혁명당; 統一革命黨) was officially founded on 25 August 1969 by Kim Jong-tae (김종태; 金鍾泰), who published a magazine named Chongmaek (청맥; 靑脈), and Choi Yong-do, with a history dating back to the 1964 formation of a preparatory committee. The group was established during the period of the Third Republic of Korea, an anti-communist military dictatorship under President Park Chung Hee, and both founders were executed along with other leaders of the organization; other members were sentenced to long prison terms. Kim Jong-tae's wife and two children were never seen again.

On 27 July 1985, the National Democratic Front of South Korea (한국민족민주전선) emerged, claiming to be the successor to the former group, and renamed its propaganda broadcasting station (that had a main station in Haeju) from "Revolutionary Party for Reunification" (통혁당방송; 統革黨放送) to "Voice of National Salvation" (구국의 방송; 求國의 放送). It adopted its current name on 23 March 2005, but ceased the operations since then, except occasional statements released in the name of AINDF on its official website or in North Korean media. No further activity has been confirmed, and it is presumably abolished by 2024 at the latest following the abandonment of reunification by North Korea.
