= Choson Yesul =

North Korean monthly arts magazine

- Cover page (No. 6. 2017)
- Categories: Arts magazine
- Frequency: Monthly
- Publisher: Munhak Yesul Ch'ulp'ansa
- Founded: 1956
- Country: North Korea
- Based in: Pyongyang
- Language: Korean
- ISSN: 1727-9402
- OCLC: 7642464

- Choson Yesul
- Hangul: 조선예술
- Hanja: 朝鮮藝術
- Lit.: Korean art
- RR: Joseon yesul
- MR: Chosŏn yesul

Choson Yesul (Korean: 조선예술; lit. 'Korean art') is a monthly cultural and arts magazine which has been published since 1956 in Pyongyang, North Korea. It is an official media outlet of the state owned federation of the literary and artistic unions, namely the Korean Federation of Literature and Arts.

== History and profile ==
Choson Yesul was launched in 1956 and is published on a monthly basis. The magazine is an official organ of the Central Committee of the Korean Federation of Literature and Arts. The headquarters is in Pyongyang.

The publisher of Choson Yesul was Munhak Yesul Chonghap Ch'ulp'ansa from January 1995 to August 2001. From September 2001 the publisher was Munhak Yesul Ch'ulp'ansa. The magazine frequently features articles promoting the North Korean leadership. For instance, it published the articles about Kim Jong-il and his parents using visuals as a tribute to his birthday in the mid-1970s.
