= TransTelekom =

- Industry: Telecommunications
- Founded: 1997
- Headquarters: Moscow, Russia
- Parent: Russian Railways
- Website: www.ttk-com.ru

TransTelecom (Russian: ТрансТелеКо́м (ТТК)) is a major telecommunications company in Russia that owns one of the largest networks in the world of fiber optical cables. The company is a full subsidiary of Russian national railway operator, Russian Railways. TTK has been actively connected broadband users in the retail market since early 2011. Since then, their number has grown by almost 10 times, and in 2014 the company intends to go abroad to 2 million users. The company's strategy stipulates that by the end of 2015 it will serve 2.3 million broadband subscribers. Community market, which the company aims at are settlements with less than 100,000 people, and they accounted for almost 40% of all connections.

== History ==
TransTelekom was founded on February 27, 1997, at the initiative of the Ministry of Railways (the predecessor of Russian Railways) for construction of digital backbone network for the needs of Russian Railways, as well as for the purpose of upgrading the information and technology segments in the infrastructure of the Ministry of Railways by constructing a high-bandwidth telecommunications network in the railroad precinct based on SDH, DWDM and IP/MPLS technologies, as well as promoting the networks' profit-making capabilities.

For three years the TTK built ROW railways fiber network length of 45 thousand km, connecting 974 settlements in 71 regions of Russia. On October 13, 2001, TTK officially started commercial operation of its backbone network.

In April 2002, the TTK went on the market and support services to the organization of virtual private networks (VPN) technology and Multiprotocol Label Switching (MPLS) IP transit. Among the first customers was TTK Internet service provider Corbina. In 2003, revenues increased by 2.5 times to $100 million, the number of corporate clients has reached 1 million in October 2003 TTK was awarded RBC Company of the Year in the field of telecommunications.

In 2004, the TTK took 40% of the market rent intercity communication channels, 12% of the market rent of land international channels, 30% market share in the segment of technology IP VPN, allowing users to create multi-enterprise networks, as well as 45% of the regional market of the main access to the Internet.

TransTelekom was granted a license to provide DLD/ILD telecommunications services in July 2005 and completed the development of its network infrastructure for the provision of DLD/ILD services by the end of 2006.

In February 2005, the TTK became the largest party in terms of the European Internet Exchange London Internet Exchange (LINX). In July 2005, the TTK became the fifth operator in Russia, received the right to provide long-distance services (after Rostelecom, Tsentrinfokoma, Golden Telecom and MTT).

In May 2006, TTK upgraded and put into operation a network technology DWDM.

In December 2007, the TTK and the Japanese company NTT Communications completed the construction of undersea fiber-optic cable system HSCS (Hokkaido-Sakhalin Cable System, "Cabling System Hokkaido–Sakhalin" ) length of 570 km. On HSCS was assigned the function of an alternative transcontinental highway for data delivery from Europe to Asia (formerly the data exchange between Europe and Asia were mainly used line, laid on the bottom of the Indian Ocean).

In 2008, TransTelekom started providing services to individuals (prior to 2008, the company provided services only to corporate customers) in the Far East and Urals regions under the TTK brand.

By October 2013 the company had reached 1.4 million users, and in 2013 the subscriber base grew by 34%.

In December 2013 TransTelekom commercially began to offer Internet with speed of 1 Gbit/s technology Gigabit Ethernet.

In 2013 the company has completed the buyback 18 regional daughters, previously owned by Russian Railways. As part of the reorganization of the TTC before the year is going to annex all subsidiaries who belong to the company to create a single organization with branch management structure by 2015.

In October 2017, the company provided a second internet connection to North Korea.

In 2021, TTK built the first quantum network in Russia. The 800-kilometre-long network connected Moscow and Saint-Petersburg.
