= James Andrew Lewis =

American diplomat

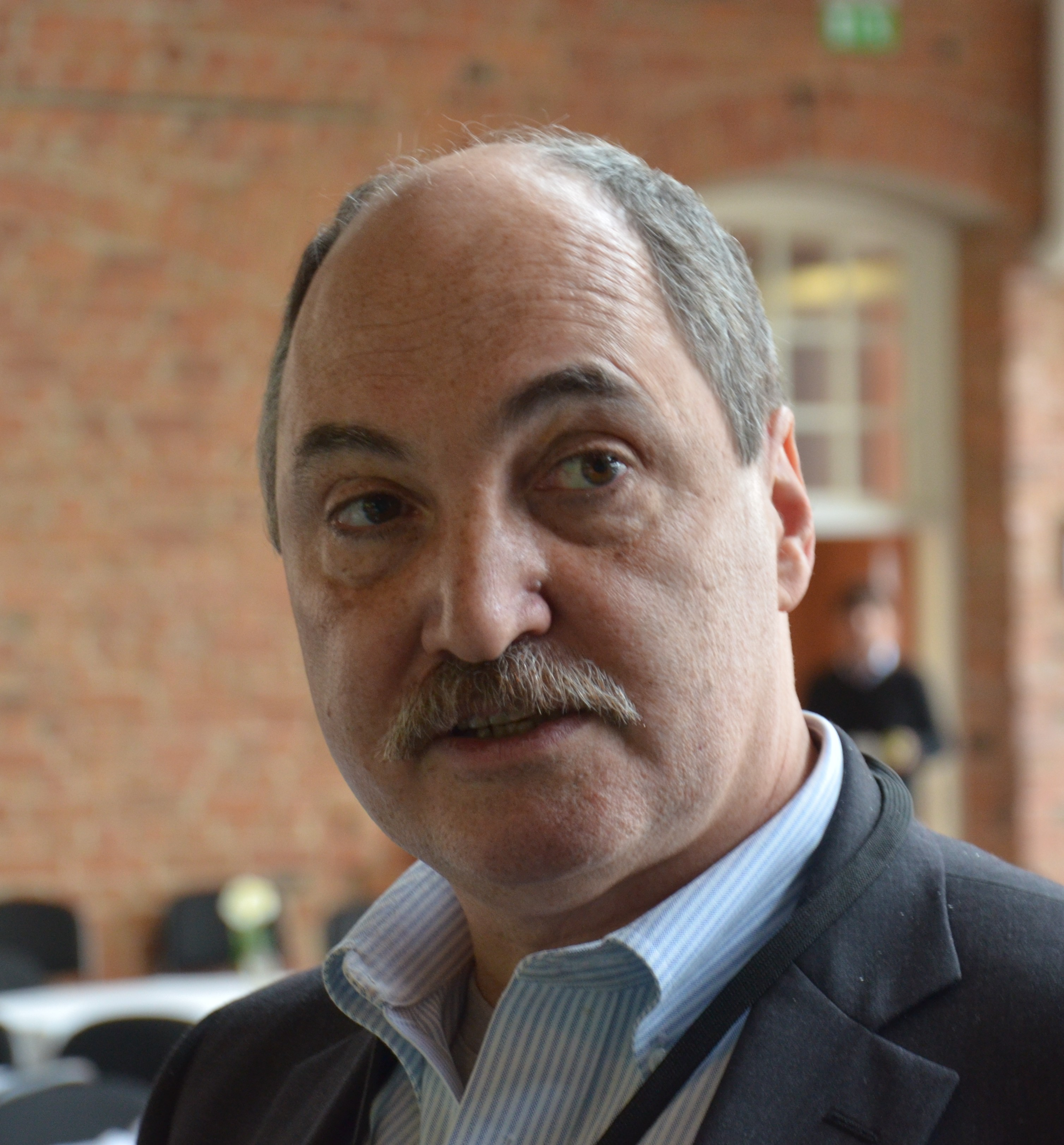
- James Lewis at Stockholm Internet Forum 2014

James Andrew Lewis is a Senior Vice President and the Director of the Technology and Public Policy Program at the Center for Strategic and International Studies (CSIS) in Washington, D.C.

James Andrew Lewis is an author and researcher with wide-ranging experience. Before joining CSIS, he was a member of the U.S. Foreign Service and Senior Executive Service, where he worked on regional security, military intervention and insurgency, conventional arms negotiations, technology transfer (including global arms sales), encryption, internet security, space remote sensing, high-tech trade with China, sanctions and Internet policy.

His diplomatic experience included negotiations on military basing in Asia, the Cambodia peace process, and the Five-power talks on arms transfer restraint. Lewis led the U.S. delegation to the Wassenaar Arrangement Experts Group for advanced civil and military technologies. He was also assigned to the U.S. Southern Command for Just Cause, the U.S. Central Command for Desert Shield, to the National Security Council, and the U.S. Central American Task Force. At Commerce, he was responsible for policy and regulation affecting, satellites, high-performance computers, semiconductors, and encryption. He was the Department's lead with the Select Committee on U.S. National Security and Military/Commercial Concerns with the People's Republic of China. Lewis served as Rapporteur for the 2010, 2013, and 2015 UN Group of Government Experts on Information Security that led to global agreement on Norms for Responsible State behavior in cyberspace.

As of 2025, Lewis has authored more than four hundred essays, articles and reports and co-edited three books. on cybersecurity, innovation, satellites, cloud computing, quantum technologies, and internet politics. He was the Project Director for CSIS's Commission on Cybersecurity for the 44th Presidency and led a long-running Track 1.5 Dialogue on cybersecurity and espionage with the China Institute of Contemporary International Relations (CICIR) He has testified numerous times before Congress, is quoted frequently in the media, and serves on the Board of a subsidiary of a major telecommunications company. Lewis earned a Ph.D. from the University of Chicago.

== Works ==
- Cyber Security: Turning National Solutions Into International Cooperation. CSIS. 2003. ISBN 978-0-89206-426-7.
- Globalization and National Security: Maintaining U.S. Technological Leadership and Economic Strength. CSIS. 2004. ISBN 978-0-89206-455-7.
- Waiting for Sputnik: Basic Research and Strategic Competition. CSIS. 2006. ISBN 978-0-89206-481-6.
- Building an Information Technology Industry in China, National Strategy, Global Markets: A Report of the Technology and Public Policy Program Center for Strategic and International Studies. CSIS. 2007. ISBN 978-0-89206-489-2.
- Intellectual Property Protection: Promoting Innovation in a Global Information Economy. CSIS. 2008. ISBN 978-0-89206-512-7.
- Jeffrey W. Knopf; Steven Metz; James Andrew Lewis (11 June 2013). "Thresholds in Uncertainty". Old Tools, New Century: Deterrence, Containment and Collective Cyberdefense. World Politics Review. pp. 23–29. ISBN 978-1-939907-12-7.
