= Joo Seong-ha =

North Korean defector

- Hangul: 주성하
- RR: Ju Seongha
- MR: Chu Sŏngha

Joo Seong-ha (Korean: 주성하; born 1975) is a journalist from North Korea who defected to South Korea in 2002. Currently he is working as a reporter in the international affairs department of the newspaper, The Dong-A Ilbo.

== Biography ==
Joo was born and grew up in a small, rural fishing village of eastern DPRK in the 1970s. He has kept his exact date of birth and birthplace secret. He graduated from Kim Il Sung University, majoring in English. Prior to his escape, he was arrested and spent time in concentration camps before finally escaping from the North in 1998. After naturalization as a South Korean citizen in 2002, he began work in the international affairs department of The Dong-A Ilbo at the end of 2003. In March 2009, he was confirmed as a specialist reporter on North Korean affairs and has composed articles related to North Korea on top of regular international affairs coverage.

Joo operates a reporter's blog called "서울에서 쓰는 평양이야기" ("Pyongyang Story Written in Seoul"), one of the most widely read online information channels about North Korea that has attracted 69 million page views as of October 3, 2015. Furthermore, despite North Korea's repeated murder threats for whom the country deems a traitor, Joo continues to broadcast every week information from the outside world across the border to North Koreans, via Radio Free Asia.

== Published works ==
- 《평양 자본주의 백과전서》(2018)
- 《세계의 명문 직업학교를 가다》
- 《외국특파원들이 본 두 개의 코리아》
- 《서울에서 쓰는 평양 이야기 : 김일성대학 나온 <동아일보> 기자 주성하》
