= Korean Federation of Literature and Arts =

- Abbreviation: KFLA
- Formation: March 25, 1946; 80 years ago
- Founded at: Pyongyang, North Korea
- Region served: North Korea
- Fields: Literature and the arts
- Main organ: Choson Yesul
- Parent organization: Propaganda and Agitation Department

- Korean Federation of Literature and Arts
- Chosŏn'gŭl: 조선문학예술총동맹
- Hancha: 朝鮮文學藝術總同盟
- Revised Romanization: Joseon Munhak Yesul Chongdongmaeng
- McCune–Reischauer: Chosŏn Munhak Yesul Ch'ongdongmaeng

The Korean Federation of Literature and Arts, (KFLA; Korean: 조선문학예술총동맹, abbreviated as 문예총, "Mun-ye-chong") is an organizational group of artists in North Korea. It was founded as the North Korean Arts Alliance on March 25, 1946,

== Function ==
As a representative arts federation of North Korea, it serves as a unified organization that oversees literary activities in all fields. The federation belongs to the Propaganda and Agitation Department of the Central Committee of the Workers' Party of Korea (WPK).

Their main task is to instill the ideology of the WPK in the literature and arts. To do this, artists receive ideology education and guidance in creative works. Writers and artists of North Korea are obligated to join the KFLA and its affiliated alliances.

As one of the main extra-governmental organizations of the WPK and having the power to appoint or even expel, artists, the federation is considered as one with great influence. For example, the North Korean Ministry of Culture and Arts and the KFLA have joint control over the literary field. Their affiliations independently issue bulletins.

== History ==
This federation was previously called the North Korean Arts Alliance, initiated in Pyongyang on March 25, 1946. Before then, communist artists were also active in the United States Army Military Government regions of Seoul, and formed their own group. The Pyongnam Proletariat Alliance (평남지구 프롤레타리아 예술 동맹), led by Ri Ki-yong and Han Sorya, was a regional group formed in the Soviet army government areas.

With the fixation of the division, the Pyongnam Proletariat Alliance merged with Pyongyang Arts & Culture Association (평양예술문화협회) which claimed to promote pure arts, expanding into a nationwide organization with a new name, the North Korean Arts Alliance (북조선예술총연맹). In October of the same year, the organization expanded yet again into the North Korean Federation of Literature and Arts (북조선문학예술총동맹, NKFLA), with seven divided affiliations in: literature, music, art, drama, film, dance and photography.

After the Korean War, pro-communist artists in Seoul who went to the North were integrated into the group, and in 1951, its current name, the Korean Federation of Literature and Arts, was given. At that time, there was an influx of a line from the Workers' Party of South Korea, and their great purge in 1953 influenced the National Artists' Art Competition (전국작가예술대회), greatly reducing the number of members. All other groups were dissolved, leaving only the Korean Writers' Alliance, Korean Artists' Alliance, and Korean Composers' Alliance.

The current federation was reorganized in March 1961, after clearing the purge of the Workers' Party of South Korea. The previously divided seven affiliations were: Korean Writers' Alliance (조선작가동맹), Korean Musicians' Alliance (조선음악가동맹), Korean Artists' Alliance (조선미술가동맹), Korean Dancers' Alliance (조선무용가동맹), Korean Theater Alliance (조선연극인동맹), Korean Film Alliance (조선영화인동맹), Korean Photography Alliance (조선사진가동맹). Korean Composers' Alliance(조선작곡가동맹) were later added in the 1970s.

== See also ==
- Choson Yesul, official magazine of the Federation
- Culture of North Korea
- Korean art
- North Korean literature

== Bibliography ==
- 김, 성민 (2002). 북한문학의 이해. 국학자료원. ISBN 8982069763
