= The Pyongyang Times =

English language North Korean weekly newspaper

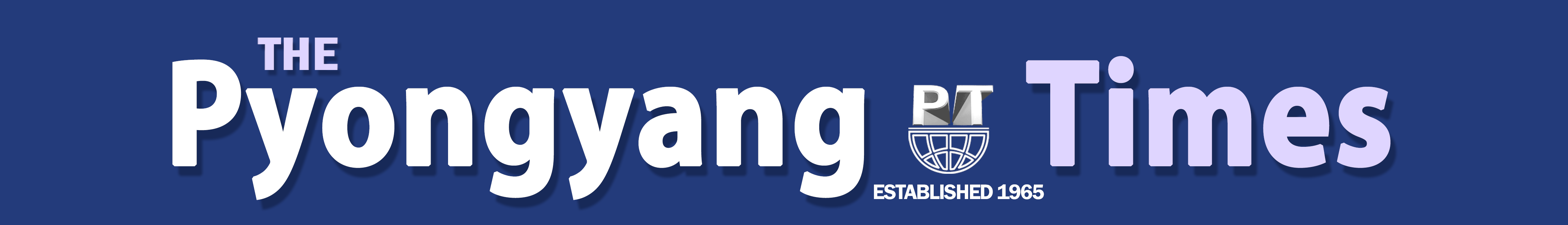

- Front cover of The Pyongyang Times on 22 November 2025
- Type: Weekly newspaper
- Format: Tabloid
- Publisher: Foreign Languages Publishing House
- Launched: 6 May 1965
- Political alignment: Workers' Party of Korea (Pyongyang city party committee)
- Language: English and French
- Headquarters: Sochon-dong, Sosong District, Pyongyang, DPRK
- City: Pyongyang
- Country: North Korea
- Circulation: 30,000 (as of 2002)
- Sister newspapers: Pyongyang Sinmun
- OCLC number: 7713208
- Website: www.pyongyangtimes.com.kp

The Pyongyang Times is a weekly state-controlled English and French-language newspaper published in the North Korean capital, Pyongyang, by the Foreign Languages Publishing House. It is the foreign-language edition of the Pyongyang Sinmun.

== History and availability ==
The eight-page tabloid was first launched on 6 May 1965 and is distributed in approximately 100 countries. For this reason, its staff are trained in English abroad. The newspaper also runs a website in several languages. Fifty-two issues of the paper are published annually. As of January 2012 there have been 2,672 issues. The circulation of the English and French editions is 30,000.

In North Korea, The Pyongyang Times is in hotel lobbies, flights into the country, and other places frequented by foreigners.

Naenara, the official North Korean news source, is the home of The Pyongyang Times.

== Structure and content ==
The front cover is usually devoted to Kim Jong Un's visits to various institutions in the country along with praise for his leadership. The next few pages detail various technological and ideological exploits of the nation, followed by propaganda against South Korea, Japan, and the United States along with other nations (such as Israel) who are considered hostile to North Korea. The last pages are similar to that of the Rodong Sinmun, offering "foreign news"—though few major world events are covered, and most of its content is focused on like-minded or socialist nations.

Most of its content, like all North Korean state media, is dedicated to Kim Jong Un and most of its news is translated from articles in the Rodong Sinmun. It has been described as lacking "actual news" and is "basically a rundown of Mr. Kim's daily agenda, with substantial flattery thrown in for good measure."

== Claims ==
The Pyongyang Times has made various claims about South Korea, particularly with regard to its allegedly poor human rights record. It has stated that 50 percent of South Koreans are unemployed, 57.6 percent are infected with tuberculosis, and that American soldiers with AIDS are posted in the south as a deliberate policy to infect the South Korean population. In a 31 May 1986 article, it criticized the decision that the 1988 Olympics were to be held in South Korea, claiming that "If the Olympic Games were to be held in South Korea, many sportsmen and tourists of the world would meet death, infected with AIDS."

During the major flooding in 2007, the paper was unusually open, providing an extensive list of damage in the country. It stated that 20,300 homes were destroyed and "several hundred" people had died, as well as damage to "223,000 hectares of farmland, 300 bridges, 200 mining pits, 82 reservoirs, and 850 power lines."

== See also ==
- List of newspapers in North Korea
- Media of North Korea
- Telecommunications in North Korea
