= Korea Today =

Multi-lingual North Korean magazine

- Vice-Director and Editor-in-Chief: Han Pong Chan
- Former editors: Son Din-fa
- Categories: current affairs, propaganda
- Frequency: Monthly
- Format: 26cm, 50–55 pages Online (PDF)
- Circulation: 138,000 (1997)
- First issue: January 1950
- Company: Foreign Languages Publishing House
- Country: North Korea
- Based in: Sochong-dong, Sosong District, Pyongyang
- Language: English, Arabic, Chinese, French, Russian, Spanish
- Website: www.korean-books.com.kp/en/search/?page=periodic-magazine
- ISSN: 0454-4072
- OCLC: 8797015

Korea Today, first published as New Korea, is a North Korean propaganda magazine published monthly by the Foreign Languages Publishing House in Pyongyang.

The magazine focuses on cultural and industrial progress made in the country. It also publishes North Korea short stories. Copies of the magazine are handed out to tourists on flights into the country.

The magazine was initially published in Russian only. Today, it is published in English, Arabic, Chinese, French, Russian, and Spanish.

== History ==
The magazine was first published as New Korea (Russian: Новая Корея) in January 1950 by the New Korea Publishing House, the predecessor of the Foreign Languages Publishing House. Since 1959, it has been published as Korea Today.

In December 1955, Son Din-fa, the chief editor of New Korea, was dismissed from his post and convicted to manual labor after drawing influences of de-Stalinization from the Soviet Union and criticizing the personality cult of Kim Il-sung.

== See also ==
- Foreign Trade of the DPRK
- Media of North Korea
