= Korean Dishes =

North Korean cooking website

- Available in: Korean (North), English
- Owner: Korean Association of Cooks
- Website: cooks.org.kp
- Commercial: No
- Launched: 2014; 12 years ago

- Korean Dishes
- Hangul: 조선료리
- Hanja: 朝鮮料理
- RR: Joseon ryori
- MR: Chosŏn ryori
- IPA: [tɕo.sʌn.ɾjo.ɾi]

Korean Dishes, also known as Chosŏn ryori (Korean: 조선료리), is a North Korean website.

The website, associated with the Korean Association of Cooks, was announced in 2012 and it launched in mid-2014.

Access to the website is blocked in South Korea on the basis of the National Security Act.

The association also publishes a magazine of the same name.
