= Chollima (website) =

North Korean online shop

Chollima (Korean: 천리마) was a North Korean website providing news and information about economic policies and foreign trade. The website contained North Korea's first online shop, believed to have opened on 31 December 2007, which had a broad range of product categories including machinery, building materials, automobiles, health foods, music and films. The website was a joint venture between North Korea and an anonymous Chinese company, and was hosted in Shenyang, China. It was named after the mythical horse Chollima.
