= North Korea Tech =

US-based blog

- Website type: Technology analysis related to North Korea
- Available in: English
- Country of origin: United States
- Creator: Martyn Williams
- Website: www.northkoreatech.org
- Launched: 2010; 16 years ago
- Current status: Active

North Korea Tech is a US-based blog authored by British journalist Martyn Williams which covers consumer electronics and technology developments in the Democratic People's Republic of Korea. It was established in 2010. North Korea Tech is based in Washington, DC. The site is affiliated with 38 North.

== Background ==
According to Williams, he was inspired to start the blog after a 15-year stint as a Tokyo-based correspondent for IDG News Service during which he observed the growing "wealth, knowledge and prosperity gap between North and South Korea." About his interest in the country, he said "North Korea appears today an even more difficult country to understand than the USSR ever was, thus my interest as a journalist." As of 2016, the website received about 20,000 visits a month.

== Coverage ==
The site has covered North Korean cell phones, satellites, internet domains, operating systems, missile technology, and online TV services. North Korea Tech has often been cited by international media, government reports, and academics researching North Korea. This has included coverage by Agence France-Presse, Vice Magazine, and TechCrunch. It has also been cited by South Korean media, such as Yonhap and The Dong-A Ilbo.

North Korea Tech was the victim of a DDoS attack in early 2016. On March 24, 2016, the site was censored in South Korea by the Korea Communications Standards Commission (KCSC) due to alleged violations of South Korea's National Security Act, a law which bans "praising, sympathizing or cooperating with North Korea". Williams appealed the ban, saying the site "doesn't seek to glorify or support North Korea". The KCSC said that the site was blocked due to linking to North Korean websites and posting videos of North Korean state media. Jillian York of the Electronic Frontier Foundation stated that "The blocking of North Korea Tech is, on face, an overbroad application of a law that in itself is in direct contrast to the principle of freedom of expression". Phil Robertson of Human Rights Watch Asia called the block "harmful to rights and counter-productive". An appeal of the ban was successful in 2017 with legal assistance from Open Net Korea.
