= Foreign Trade of the DPRK =

North Korean magazine

Foreign trade of the Democratic People's Republic of Korea
- Editor: Yun Hyang Sim, An Hyang Suk
- Photographer: Kang Chol Song, Jon Son Il
- Categories: Trade magazine, foreign trade
- Frequency: Quarterly
- Format: A4, 40–45 pages Online (PDF) / Printed
- Circulation: 28,000 (1997)
- Company: Foreign Trade Publishing House
- Country: North Korea
- Based in: Sochon-dong, Sosong District, Pyongyang
- Language: English, Chinese, French, Japanese, Russian, Spanish
- Website: https://www.korean-books.com.kp/index.php/Main/index/periodic/en
- ISSN: 1727-916X
- OCLC: 2349368

Foreign Trade of the DPRK is a North Korean magazine. It covers North Korean companies that are looking to export their products and introduces their contact details. The magazine is affiliated with the North Korean Committee for the Promotion of International Trade. It is published quarterly by the Foreign Trade Publishing House of North Korea. The magazine is published in English, Chinese, French, Japanese, Russian and Spanish.

== Companies and products ==
A 2011 South Korean analysis of the magazine's issues from a period of five years concluded that there are about 200 North Korean export companies in operation attempting to earn foreign currency. In reality, however, the number could be smaller since North Korean companies regularly change names in order to avoid sanctions.

Some companies offer to produce goods according to buyers' specifications. The magazine is known for promoting sometimes unusual products. For instance, in 2013, the magazine advertised unauthorized Sesame Street Big Bird, Cookie Monster and Elmo plush animals manufactured by the Kyonghung Trading Corporation. A 2015 issue promoted furs by the Taehung Fur Trading Corporation, despite there being no previous knowledge of North Korea's fur exports. The same issue also promoted a "cure-all" pill with vague descriptions of dosage and uncertain adherence to medicinal standards, likely aimed at the oriental medicine market in Asia.

== See also ==
- Economy of North Korea#External trade
- Foreign Trade Bank of the Democratic People's Republic of Korea
- Korea Today
- Media of North Korea
- Ministry of External Economic Relations
