= Korea National Insurance Corporation =

North Korean insurance company

- Native name: 조선민족보험총회사
- Type: Insurance company
- Founded: July 10, 1947; 79 years ago
- Headquarters: Pyongyang, North Korea
- Website: knic.com.kp

The Korea National Insurance Corporation (Korean: 조선민족보험총회사) is an insurance company owned by the North Korean government. It has about 210 branches throughout the country.

== History ==
The company was founded on 10th of July 1947. On 25th of July 2007 the company held its 60th anniversary report meeting. In 2024 it was reported that the company will start insure foreign companies investing in North Korea.

== Controversies ==
It has been claimed that the company is a front to funnel money to the North Korean nuclear weapons program.
