= Uriminzokkiri =

North Korean news website

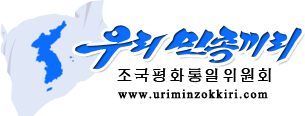
- Website type: News
- Available in: Korean (North Korean standard), English, Chinese, Japanese, Russian
- Owner: Korea 615 Shenyang Co.
- Editor: Korea June 15 Edition Company (조선륙일오편집사)
- Website: uriminzokkiri.com/index.php?lang=eng (English)
- Commercial: No
- Registration: None for use, required for commenting
- Launched: 2003
- Current status: Offline

- Uriminzokkiri
- Hangul: 우리민족끼리
- Hanja: 우리民族끼리
- RR: Uriminjokkkiri
- MR: Uriminjokkiri

Uriminzokkiri (Korean: 우리 민족끼리) was a North Korean state-controlled news website, much of whose content was syndicated from other news groups within the country, such as Korean Central News Agency. Aside from on their own website, Uriminzokkiri also distributed information over YouTube, Facebook, Flickr, Twitter, Youku and Instagram until they had deleted their social media presence. Uriminzokkiri's official website was blocked in South Korea, and their Facebook and YouTube accounts were both terminated.

== Etymology ==
The Uriminzokkiri website offered no official English translation of its name. The term can be broken down into uri, meaning "we", "our", or "collective self"; minjok, meaning "people", "nation", or in this case simply "Koreans"; and kkiri, meaning "with", "between", "together", or "among", in some cases with an exclusionary nuance, presumably intended in this case to convey the notion that Korean issues are to be solved by the Koreans themselves and not third parties or superpowers. The translation "on our own as a nation" has been used by a major newspaper. A relatively literal translation would yield "Our People (or Peoples) Together/As One", "Bringing Our Nation(s) Together", or "We the [Korean] People". A less literal translation incorporating the exclusionary nuance of kkiri might yield "Just Us Koreans".

== History ==
Uriminzokkiri was launched in 2003 from a server in Shanghai. It was the first website established by North Korea.

In August 2010, Uriminzokkiri launched YouTube, Facebook, and X (formerly Twitter) accounts in an effort to improve North Korea's image around the world. Uriminzokkiri maintains an account on the Chinese video platform Youku, and has uploaded more than 14,000 videos.

On 3 April 2013, hacker group Anonymous claimed it had stolen 15,000 user passwords as part of a cyberwar against the DPRK. Several hours later, Anonymous claimed responsibility for hacking into the Uriminzokkiri website and its X (formerly Twitter) and Flickr accounts.

In January 2017 the American internet platform YouTube temporarily terminated Uriminzokkiri's YouTube Channel, due to legal complaints without stating any further information.

Uriminzokkiri has been offline since 11 January 2024, after North Korean leader Kim Jong Un called for a "fundamental turnaround" of North Korea's policy towards reunification and South Korea.

Around February 2024, the handle for the @uriminzok X (formerly Twitter) account was apparently taken over by another party, suggesting that Uriminzokkiri has removed its social media presence.

== Popular incidents and news articles ==
On 18 September 2012, Uriminzokkiri uploaded a video containing a photoshopped image of South Korea's president-elect Park Geun-hye performing the dance moves of "Gangnam Style". The video also mocks her as a devoted admirer of the Yushin system of autocratic rule set up by her father, Park Chung Hee.

On 5 February 2013, a film that featured New York City in flames was removed from YouTube after a Digital Millennium Copyright Act complaint filed by Activision due to the use of footage from Call of Duty: Modern Warfare 3. On 19 March 2013, a new North Korean propaganda video was posted on the Uriminzokkiri YouTube channel that presented images of an imagined missile attack on U.S. government buildings in Washington, D.C., including the White House and the Capitol.

On 21 May 2013, Uriminzokkiri claimed that North Korea's threat to target the Blue House (using unmanned aerial vehicles instead of surface-to-surface missiles) was intended to use "terrain features for cover". It also pointed out that the UAVs are capable of hitting the Blue House in less than three minutes travelling at 925 km/h. The website further boasted that North Korean drones are also capable of attacking the Capital Defence Command on the southern side of Mount Kwanak in southern Seoul. South Korea's top brass ignored these imminent provocations, just as they did in 2010 before the sinking of the Navy corvette Cheonan.

On 24 March 2014, weeks after Australian missionary John Short was deported from North Korea for "anti-state" religious acts, Uriminzokkiri released an article using biblical terms and references to describe the country as a utopian paradise. Titled "Korea is a human paradise in which Jesus would have nothing to do even if he came", the article portrays North Korea as a land with free healthcare, free education, and no taxes thanks to Kim Jong Un. The article claimed that its title is a direct quote from an American religious figure who visited North Korea but is not named throughout the article.

== See also ==
- DPRK Today
- Naenara
