= Korean American National Coordinating Council =

Non-profit in the United States

- 재미동포전국연합회
- Abbreviation: KANCC
- Formation: 1997
- Founded at: New York
- Type: Nonprofit, NGO
- Headquarters: Englewood Cliffs, New Jersey
- Location: United States
- Official language: Korean and English
- Leader: Yun Gil-sang
- Budget: $2.27k USD (2018)
- Website: www.kancc.org

The Korean American National Coordinating Council (Korean: 재미동포전국연합회) is an American 501(c)(3) nonprofit organization headquartered in Englewood Cliffs. It is currently the largest organization of Koreans residing in the United States with ties to North Korea.

== History ==
This organization was founded by various organizations of Koreans in United States in New York in 1997. Prior to this, the organization "Korean Family and National Federation" was established in 1992 to organize groups of Korean-Americans to travel to North Korea.

== Activities ==
They own a news website "Minjok Tongshin", which has been accused of being a North Korean propaganda website and promoting anti-semitism.

In 2018 they performed the concert “Peace Korea Concert” of Korean traditional music at the Kaufman Music Center.

== Controversies ==
In August 2015, the organization has been investigated for tax evasion by participating in prohibited activities.
