= Sosong-guyok =

Sŏsŏng-guyŏk 서성구역
- Guyŏk of Pyongyang

Korean transcription(s)
  - Hanja: 西城區域
  - McCune-Reischauer: Sŏsŏng-guyŏk
  - Revised Romanization: Seoseong-guyeok
- Location of Sosong-guyok within Pyongyang
- Coordinates: 39°03′40″N 125°44′40″E
- Country: North Korea
- Direct-administered city: P'yŏngyang-Chikhalsi

Area
  - Total: 12.64 km^{2} (4.88 sq mi)

Population (2008)
  - Total: 147,138
  - Density: 11,640/km^{2} (30,150/sq mi)

- Sosong-guyok
- Hangul: 서성구역
- Hanja: 西城區域
- Revised Romanization: Seoseong-guyeok
- McCune–Reischauer: Sŏsŏng-kuyŏk

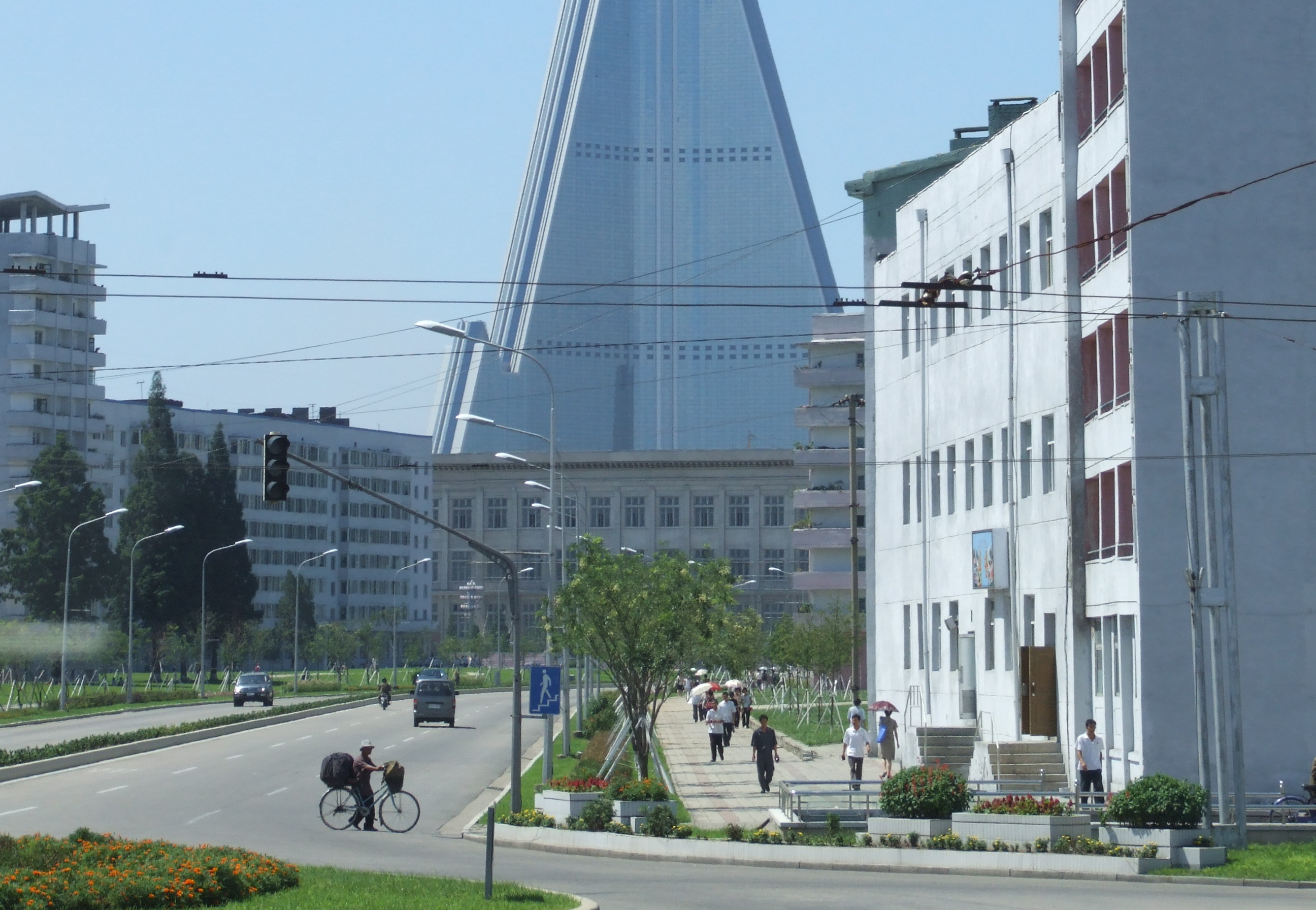
Street corner in Sosong-guyok

Sŏsŏng-guyŏk, or Sosong District, is one of the 19 guyok which constitute the city of Pyongyang, North Korea. It is located on the Pot'ong River, west of the Moranbong-guyŏk (Moranbong District) and south of Hyŏngjesan-guyŏk (Hyongjesan District). It was established January 1958.

== Administrative divisions ==
Sŏsŏng-guyŏk is divided into thirteen administrative districts known as dong. Two neighborhoods (Changgyong and Sosan) are further divided in two parts for administrative purposes.

	Chosŏn'gŭl	Hancha
Changsan-dong	장산동	長山洞
Changgyŏng-dong	장경동	長慶洞
Chungsin-dong	중신동	中新洞
Hasin-dong	하신동	下新洞
Kinjae-dong	긴재동	긴재洞
Namgyo-dong	남교동	南橋洞
Ryŏnmot-tong	련못동	蓮못洞
Sanghŭng-dong	상흥동	上興洞
Sangsin-dong	상신동	上新洞
Sŏch'ŏn-dong	서천동	西川洞
Sŏsan-dong	서산동	西山洞
Sŏkpong-dong	석봉동	石峰洞
Wasan-dong	와산동	臥山洞
