= Censorship in North Korea =

North Korea ranks among some of the most extreme and controlled censorship in the world, with the government able to take strict control over communications. North Korea sits at one of the lowest places of Reporters Without Borders' 2025 Press Freedom Index, ranking 179 out of the 180 countries investigated; only Eritrea ranks lower.

In North Korea, all media outlets are owned and controlled by the government, and all news content are produced and censored by the Korean Central News Agency. The media dedicate a large portion of their resources toward political propaganda and promoting the personality cult of the Kim family (Kim Il Sung, Kim Jong Il, and Kim Jong Un). The government of Kim Jong Un still has authority over and control of the press and information and has been repeatedly ranked one of the top 5 countries in the world with the least amount of media freedom.

== Impact of censorship ==
Censorship is a form of media monopoly, where the government oversees all media content in order to maintain obedience. North Korea utilizes a three-tiered approach to control its citizens at the ideological, physical, and institutional level. This applies not only to North Korean residents but also to visitors.

The impact of media censorship on North Korean children features in an approach in which the representation of Kim Jong Un, the leader of the Workers' Party of North Korea, is deified as an omnipotent leader. This starts as early as in childhood – as such, North Korean children can get access only to limited literature and media content.

As for adults, the UN Commission of Inquiry (COI) acknowledges multiple violations of human rights in North Korea that are connected to censorship and governmental control, specifically violations of freedom of thought and personal expression.

Journalists' safety is also impacted by censorship. According to Reporters Without Borders, the Korean Central News Agency (KCNA) restricts and controls the production and distribution of information while also prohibiting independent journalism, despite the North Korean constitution stating the contrary. Some journalist practices executed in North Korea would lead to legal punishments, including death penalty.

== History ==
=== Kim Il Sung (Leader from 1948–1994) ===
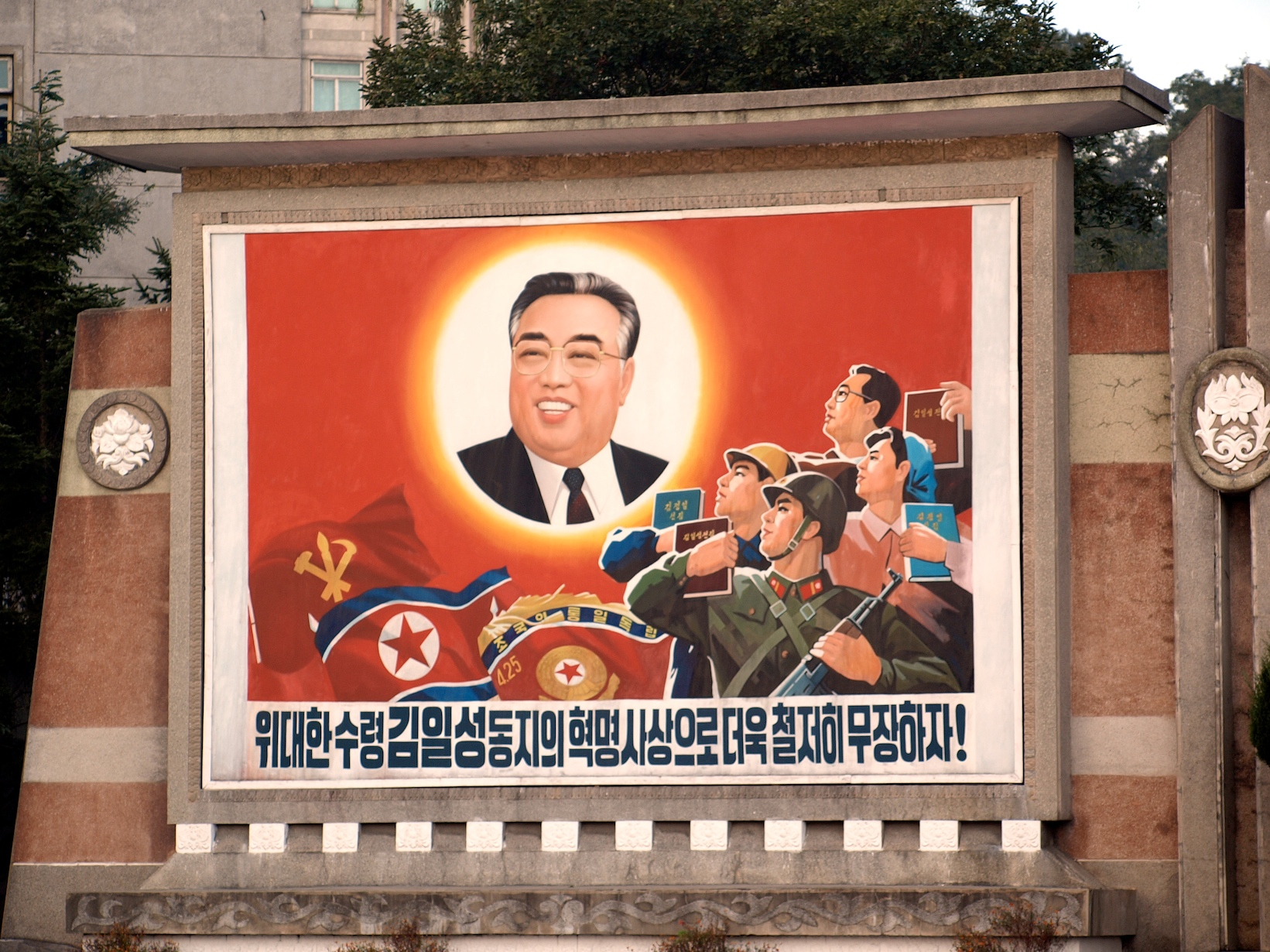
Mural of Kim Il Sung outside Songdowon Hotel, Wonsan

Kim Il Sung was born an ordinary man named Kim Sung-ju on April 15, 1912, at the peak of European and Japanese imperialism. Kim Il Sung's tenure was marked by human rights abuses, such as prison camps and harsh censorship. Kim Il Sung's policies are still in effect as of July 2023. According to Freedom House, as of 2015, all local North Korean media outlets are run by the state. Radios and television sets are modified to receive only approved channels.

==== 1946–present: The Korean Central News Agency ====
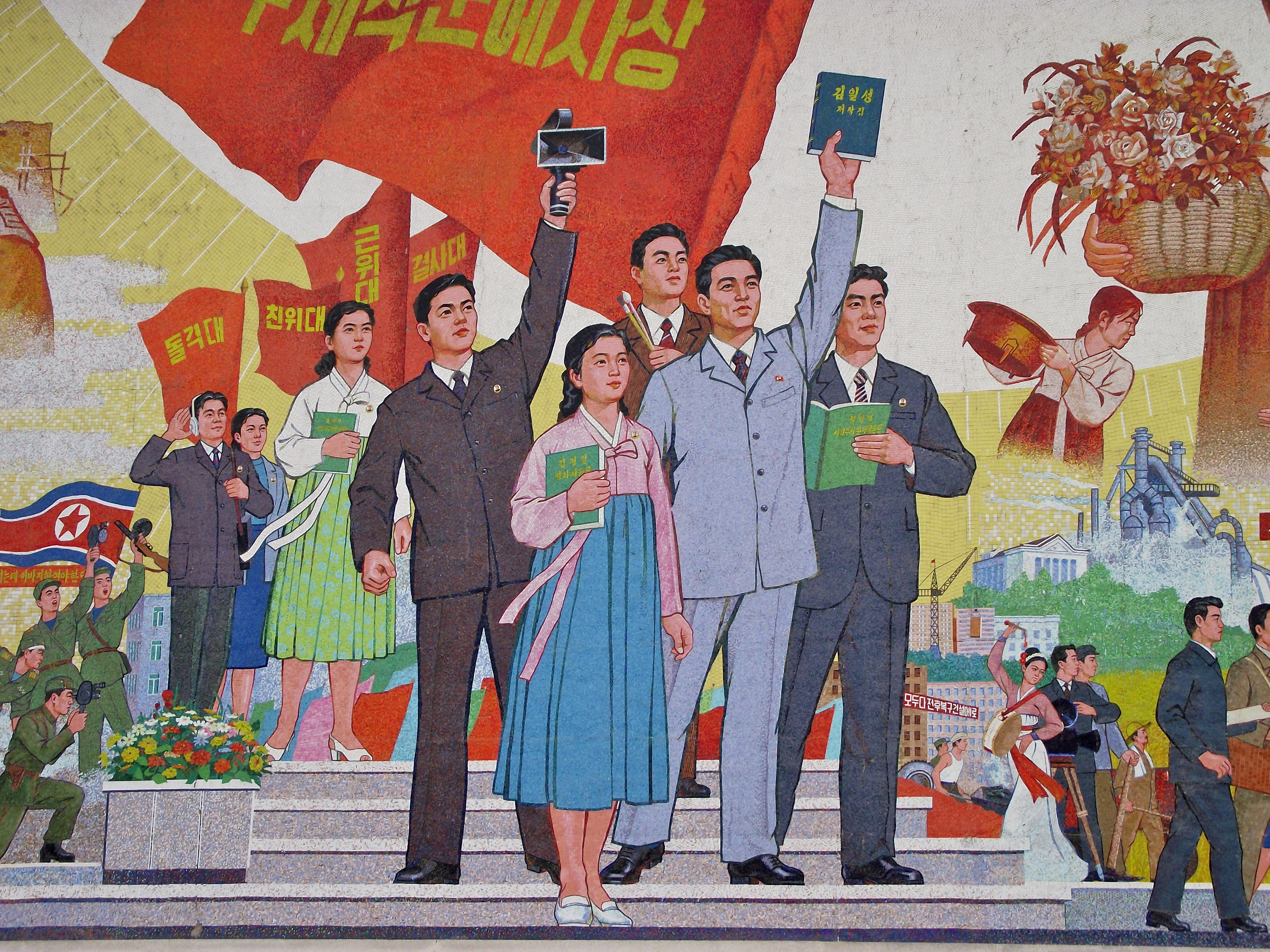
Propaganda in North Korea

The Korean Central News Agency (KCNA) is the state news agency of North Korea. The KCNA was established on December 5, 1946. The agency publishes the views of the North Korean government for foreign news outlets to consume and cite. According to its website, the KCNA "speaks for the Workers' Party of Korea and the [North Korean] government". It is the primary method by which the North Korean government publishes its views outside of the country.

The KCNA is responsible for all news in North Korea and also distributes photos. Their content is available in Korean, English, Spanish, and Japanese. From January 1, 2011, the site also began offering video. The KCNA often broadcasts North Korean propaganda. The KCNA frequently publishes articles concerning "imperialism" from the United States and South Korea. The KCNA acts as the nation's public relations and multimedia firm, with news closely relating to propaganda. Some themes the KCNA consistently covers include denouncing the actions of the United States and Japan as well as promoting the celebrity and personality of Kim Jong Un and Kim Jong Il. Their 2,000+ employees are under strict control to make sure they report in favor of their country.

=== Kim Jong Il (Leader from 1994–2011) ===
Kim Jong Il was made commander-in-chief and head of the military affairs commission by his father Kim Il Sung in the spring of 1994. Later that year in July, Kim Il Sung died. Kim Jong Il became the next member of the Kim dynasty to govern North Korea. Kim Jong Il upheld his father's authoritarian regime and strict censorship. He was known for maintaining strict censorship and using military propaganda to dissolve the dilemma of lacking freedom of information. Despite only giving citizens access to hyper-militarized government propaganda, many cell phones and DVDs were obtained illegally under Kim Jong Il.

In 1983, Kim Jong Il's book The Great Teacher of Journalists was translated into English. In this book, Kim Jong Il guides journalists to take the best pictures of their leader, study their leader's works, and instill loyalty to their leader in others. Kim Jong Il includes stories of his remarkable feats in this book, detailing a time when he saved a reporter from death and when he edited a writer's political essay to perfection.

==== 2004–2008: Cell phone ban ====
The North Korean government has implemented policies to prevent outside sources of information from reaching the people of North Korea. Starting in the 1990s when famine overtook the country, traders used cell phones as a means to illegally bring food and goods across the border.

In December 2008 Orascom Telecom, an Egyptian company introduced North Korea to Koryolink, a 3G network. Internet access is permitted only for foreign travelers or the elite. By 2015, three million North Koreans had subscribed to Koryolink. Users of Koryolink must apply for permission to subscribe and are "subject to controls and surveillance by at least eight ministries and organizations between the party, state and army." The network does not allow any access to international calls. Users sometimes will receive propaganda messages.

In 2013, foreigners were granted 3G mobile phone Internet access by monthly data plan; the service could be implemented via USB modem or SIM Card. Recently, with more government awareness of alternative access to external information, increased security measures to eliminate these resources have been enacted. This includes higher border security where illicit cell phones gain access to China's mobile networks.

These phones could be vehicles for releasing detailed news of harsh ruling within the country which is prohibited. Beyond punishment for those using phones within the country, a danger exists for escapees spreading knowledge of the country's extreme laws. Text messages and cell phone photographs are sent to external journalists and activists in South Korea to spread knowledge of the conditions. Some North Koreans act as journalists and sources by sending information and sharing stories. Prominent news accounts surrounding Kim Jong Un's ankle surgery and his wife, Ri Sol-ju's 2012 pregnancy were released from these insiders.

As social media and news applications via smartphones become the common thread of news outlets, North Korea pushes further curtailment. A tightly controlled cyberspace exists within the country where a small number of upper-class citizens have access to an intranet, called Kwangmyong. In contrast to the otherwise global World Wide Web, this independent resource provides communication between industry, universities, and government. It is used to spread information through chats and emails which are both monitored and filtered by the government, allowing only a select group of researchers, propagandists, and media workers to access state media and items which have been removed from the public's Internet.

=== Kim Jong Un (Leader from 2011–present) ===
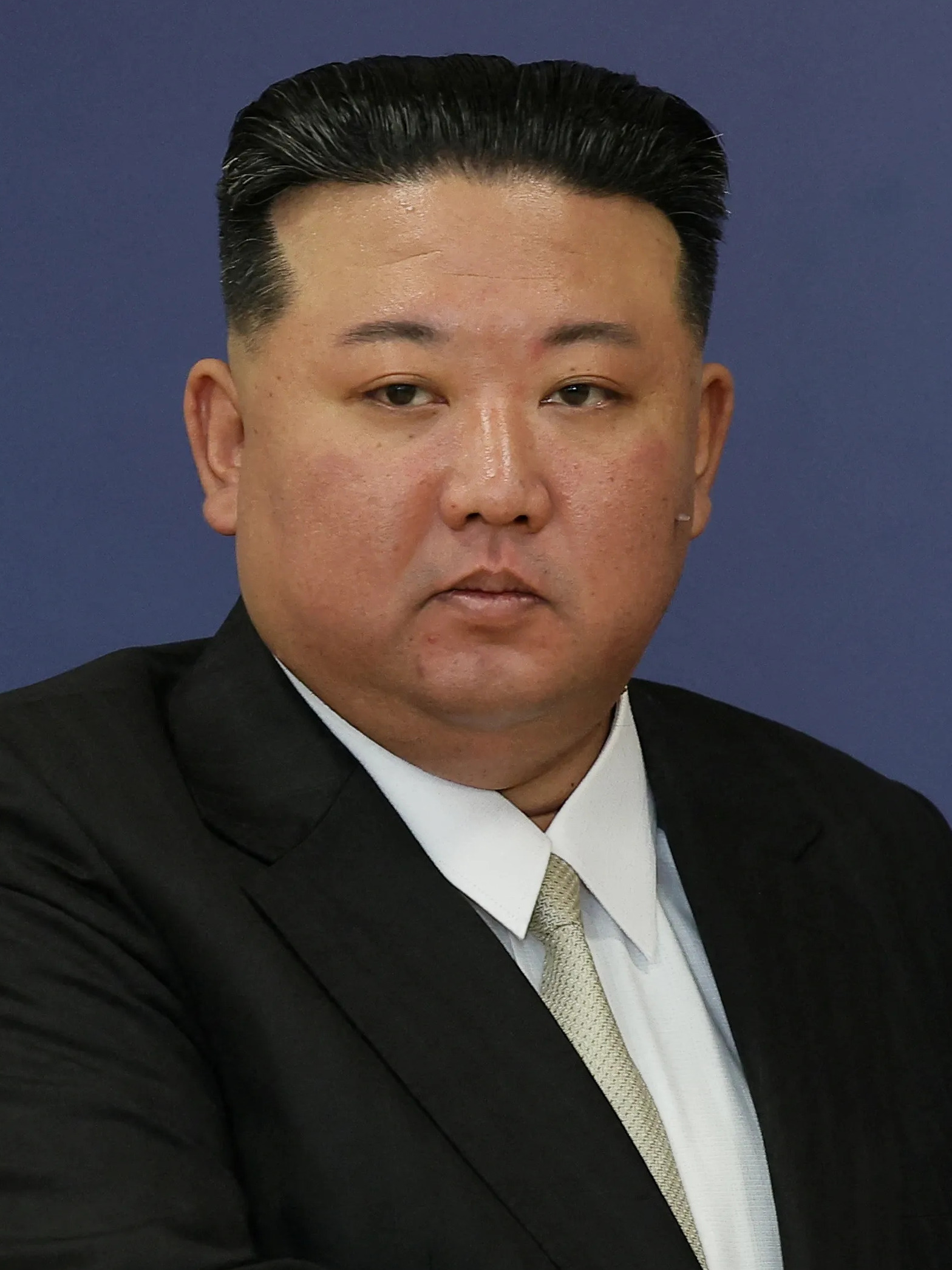
Kim Jong Un in September 2023

Kim Jong Un continues his predecessors' rule and worked to consolidate power since becoming the supreme leader of North Korea on December 28, 2011. He ordered the execution of his uncle, Jang Song-thaek, and allegedly commanded the assassination of his older half-brother, Kim Jong-nam.

Kim Jong Un keeps North Korea under his surveillance through extreme censorship. As of April 2020, the regime has a press freedom score from the World Press Freedom Index rankings (made by Reporters Without Borders) of 83.4, with 100 being the worst score, and is ranked last in global rankings of 180 countries. North Korean journalists must belong to the ruling Workers' Party of Korea (WPK) and adjust their reportings to positively reflect Kim Jong Un's leadership. Foreign media are not welcomed and are often used as scapegoats by North Korean media. A U.S. State Department report noted that failure to follow strict guidelines as set forth by the WPK can lead to imprisonment, forced labor, or death.

Human rights violations in North Korea raise global concern. Kim Jong Un's regime is notorious for torture, mysterious disappearances, and sexual violence. Each layer of the government is structured to expel potential political threats and disseminate the ideology of Kim Jong Un, and those who attempt to circumvent censorship face steep consequences.

In 2020, North Korea passed the Law on Rejecting Reactionary Ideology and Culture, which imposes penalty ranging from forced labor to death for those that want to keep or distribute cultural materials, such as TV programs, books and songs from "hostile countries," such as South Korea, Japan and the United States.

== Radio and television censorship ==
Radio or television sets that can be bought in North Korea are preset to receive only the government frequencies and sealed with a label to prevent tampering with the equipment. It is a serious criminal offence to manipulate the sets and receive radio or television broadcasts from outside North Korea. In a party campaign in 2003, the head of each party cell in neighborhoods and villages received instructions to verify the seals on all radio sets.

According to the Daily NK, it is possible to broadcast news for North Korea through short-wave radio. Possessing a short-wave radio is against the law in North Korea, but the radios are allegedly confiscated and resold by corrupted agents of the secret police.

High-ranking officials have access to cellphones and the internet while others are limited to the programmed government stations that broadcast propaganda. Every television is monitored and inspected throughout each year to ensure there are no outside stations being transmitted illegally. Additionally, songs heard on both televisions and radios are supervised to be based on praising communism and the party leaders, with the superstition that members of the Kim family are writing them.

"A Quiet Opening: North Koreans in a Changing Media Environment," a study commissioned by the U.S. State Department and conducted by InterMedia and released May 10, 2012, found that despite strict regulations, North Koreans, particularly the elites, have increased access to news and other media outside the state-controlled media authorized by the government. While access to the internet is controlled, radio and DVDs are common media accessed, and in border areas, television. Up to one in two urban households own a Notel (also called Notetel), a portable media player made in China which has been popular in North Korea since about 2005 and was legalized in 2014 and has been credited with facilitating the extension of the "Korean Wave" (Hallyu, the increase of the popularity of South Korean pop culture internationally) into North Korea.

As of 2011, USB flash drives were selling well in North Korea, primarily used for watching South Korean dramas and films on personal computers.

== Journalism ==
North Korea is ranked second to the bottom of the Press Freedom Index rankings published annually by Reporters Without Borders. From 2002 through 2006, the country was listed as the worst in the world, and from 2007 to 2016, it was listed second to last (behind Eritrea) of some 180 countries. In 2017 and 2018, North Korea was ranked the worst again. In 2019, it was rated second to last, above Turkmenistan. In 2020, it was once again ranked last.

== Internet policies ==
In 2006, Julien Pain, head of the Internet Desk at Reporters Without Borders, described North Korea as the world's worst Internet black hole, in its list of the top 13 Internet enemies.

Internet access is not generally available in North Korea. Only some high-level officials and foreigners are allowed to access the global internet. In most universities, a small number of strictly monitored computers are provided. Other citizens may get access only to the country's national intranet, called Kwangmyong. Content on Kwangmyong is curated by Korea Computer Center. Foreigners can access the internet using the 3G phone network. However, the IT industry has been growing and Internet access is starting to increase within North Korea. With few exceptions, Kwangmyong is completely separate from the global internet as a means for North Korea to use private state-controlled resources which is completely regulated by the regime. This intranet is difficult for foreign adversaries to access, and therefore allows the country to maintain its own private internet.

The North Korean Ullim, an Android-based tablet computer available since 2014, has a high level of inbuilt surveillance and controls. The tablet takes screenshots of apps opened by the user and saves browsing history. The tablet also only allows access to a limited number of approved applications, shares watermarking data to track the distribution of content between people and only allows users to access content created on the tablet or from the tablet. Content sent from other users or third party platforms cannot be accessed.

As of 2022, ordinary citizens with mobile devices do not have access to the global internet. Instead, these individuals are only able to access Kwangmyong, that is operated by the country. In terms of global internet access, this privilege is only granted to a small number of North Korean elites. Internet access is restricted to military and government business.

== See also ==
- Media of North Korea
- Telecommunications in North Korea
- North Korean postal service
- Propaganda in North Korea
- Mass surveillance in North Korea
- Human rights in North Korea
- Cyberactivism in North Korea
