= Mass surveillance in North Korea =

Mass surveillance in North Korea is a routine practice employed throughout the country. North Korea "operates a vast network of informants who monitor and report to the authorities fellow citizens they suspect of criminal or subversive behavior." North Korea has been described as a "massive police state", and its people "under constant surveillance".

== Overview ==
One author wrote:

Seemingly, every aspect of a person's existence in North Korea is monitored. This oversight of citizens has extended beyond wired microphones and wiretapping of fixed-line and mobile phones. Microphones are now even being used outdoors to pick up conversations. There is a general sense that it is dangerous to engage in any serious conversation about sensitive topics when three or more people gather at one place, regardless of how friendly they may be.

Juan Reynaldo Sánchez, a defected bodyguard for Fidel Castro who visited North Korea in 1986, wrote later how Fidel's Bodyguard Units were briefed by Cuban Intelligence who had worked in North Korea not to say anything sensitive since "The North Koreans put mics everywhere, listen to everything, and film everything". Unlike Cuba, where it was usually limited to certain rooms for the purposes of investigations, the North Koreans reportedly bugged everywhere: hallways, elevators, rooms, bathrooms, etc. Curious about the veracity of this, while in a hotel elevator with another bodyguard, Sánchez disingenuously said out loud "You know what? I would love to read the works of Kim Il-Sung in Spanish. It's probably really interesting. But we can't get them in Cuba. It's a shame, don't you think?". Upon returning to their rooms later in the evening, all the members of the Cuban delegation found spread out on their beds the complete collection of Kim Il-Sung's works in Spanish.

All computers are subject to random checks by authorities and must be registered with the government. Some computers may access the national intranet, called Kwangmyong, but true Internet access is restricted to the "super-elites". North Korean officials stationed abroad generally have their internet access monitored by staff.

Western companies have been criticized for selling surveillance technology to repressive regimes, including North Korea. In order to "tighten surveillance over the populations in the border regions", surveillance teams were switched from five people to three.

== Organizations ==
The four major surveillance organizations in North Korea are the State Security Department, the Ministry of Public Security (MPS), Ministry of State Security (MSS) and the Military Security Command (MSC).

The Committee for Human Rights in North Korea reports that North Korea operates a "massive, multilevel system of informants", rewarding informers with gifts. That informant network is run by the State Security Department (SSD), which controls at least 50,000 personnel, and the SSD maintains a network of prisons for individual suspected of "holding unacceptable views". The MPS monitors correspondence and telephone conversations. The Organization and Guidance Department of the Workers' Party of Korea is responsible for investigating and spying on senior officials.

The Ministry of Social Security, the nation's police agency, is estimated to control nearly 140,000 - 210,000 public security personnel. The current total number of informers for the police is estimated at 200,000 to 300,000, with many more having collaborated in the past.

The Military Security Command of the Korean People's Army (KPA), the country's armed forces, is tasked with monitoring "the activities and political loyalties of [North Korean] military commanders and other KPA officers" and "identifying anyone seen as disloyal". The MSC became more prominent in the mid-90s, when there began a rapid increase in defections.

Since all North Koreans are generally expected to be employed at a state place of work, surveillance also takes place at work.

== In the 2010s ==
Over a span of four years, the government purchased about 100,000 closed-circuit television cameras.

Ri Yong-ho, who held the post of Chief of the General Staff of the Korean People's Army, was 'purged' after he was reportedly recorded on wiretap complaining about Kim Jong Un.

== See also ==
- Censorship in North Korea
- Human rights in North Korea
- Inminban
- Internet in North Korea
- North Korean postal service
- Telecommunications in North Korea
- Kwangmyong (network)
