= Arirang (smartphone) =

North Korean android smartphone

- Manufacturer: Local vendor
- Type: Smartphone
- Form factor: Slate
- Operating system: Android
- Data inputs: Multi-touch, capacitive touchscreen Push buttons

Arirang (Korean: 아리랑) is a line of Android smartphones from North Korea, named after the Korean folk song of the same name.

== History ==
In 2013, Kim Jong Un toured a factory called the "May 11 Factory" that makes the Arirang smartphones.

Kim Jong Un has expressed his excitement with and support of the smartphone, believing it will support the country's economy and "instill national pride and self-respect".

In August of the same year, the first Arirang phone was released and was claimed to be the first domestically produced smartphone, though analysts say that the phone is likely to be manufactured in China. Defectors also claim the phone looks Chinese.

== Functionalities ==
A Japanese blog compared the Arirang AS1201 with the Chinese Uniscope U1201. The two models had mostly the same specs.

According to a Danish software developer in 2018, the phone has features including Bluetooth, 3G connectivity, a microSD slot and "encrypted" messaging.

Christian Budde Jensen said that it comes with multiple games which are five versions of Angry Birds, Super Mario and Plants vs. Zombies.

As of 2023, it is not known if Arirang have released any new models.

== Products ==
Phones released in order – Arirang AS1201, Arirang 151, Arirang 152, Arirang 161, the Gold Arirang (which has a golden interior), the Double-sided Tachi Arirang FP68, Arirang 171 and the Arirang 221.

=== Arirang 151 ===
In 2016, the Arirang 151 (Korean: 아리랑 151) was launched alongside a budget version, the Arirang 152 (Korean: 아리랑 152).

The phone had a slide out design. It had a 32GB memory chip and a 13 megapixel camera (4192 x 3104 pixel).

It also had an "app locker" on it. These updated Arirang smartphones didn't allow Bluetooth file transfers from foreign phones.

=== Arirang 152 ===
See above.

=== Arirang 161 ===
In 2017, the Arirang 161 (Korean: 아리랑 161) was released.

It had a 4.7-inch screen and was equipped with a 32 GB memory card. It was also the first Arirang phone to have a fingerprint sensor.

=== Arirang 171 ===
The Arirang 171 (Korean: 아리랑 171) was released in 2018.

The phone runs on Android Nougat and has a Core 2.6 GHz MediaTek MT6797 processor, a 5.5-inch panel, 4 GB of RAM, dual-rear camera 13MP lens, 8MP front-facing camera, 32 GB of ROM, a fingerprint sensor and support for 4K video recording.

The Arirang 171 can connect to the Mirae WiFi network.

=== Arirang 221 ===
In October 2023, a smartphone called the Arirang 221 (Korean: 아리랑 221) appeared in a Korean Central Television video.

Although not much is known about the Arirang 221, it may have been released around 2023.

== Price ==
The phone was distributed to local sales points operated by mobile operators such as Koryolink to be sold together with 3G SIM cards or as a stand-alone device.

According to Daily NK, in 2014, the Arirang was sold for $400.

According to a CNN report, Arirang phones were sold for $350 in Pyongyang in 2017. It costs 3.3 million KPW to buy an Arirang smartphone.

== See also ==
- Samjiyon tablet computer
- Notel
- Ullim
- Internet in North Korea
- Telecommunications in North Korea
