= Rakwon (disambiguation) =

Rakwon

Rakwon or Ragwon (Korean: 락원, lit. 'paradise') may also refer to:

- Ragwon County, North Korea
- Ragwon Station (disambiguation), multiple meanings

== See also ==
- Raekwon (name)
