= Telephone numbers in North Korea =

- Country: North Korea
- Continent: Asia
- Country code: +850
- International access: 00 or 99
- Long-distance: 0

Telephone numbers in North Korea are regulated by the Ministry of Post and Telecommunications.

== Area codes ==
This is the official list as registered with ITU-T in 2011.

List of allocations in 2011
Area code	Length of customer number	City	Province
2 11	Unknown	Pyongyang	Pyongyang
2 12	Unknown	Pyongyang	Pyongyang
2 18	3 digits	Pyongyang	Pyongyang
2 381	4 digits	Pyongyang	Pyongyang
2 771	4 digits	Pyongyang	Pyongyang
2 772	4 digits	Pyongyang	Pyongyang
2 880	13 digits	Pyongyang	Pyongyang
2 881	13 digits	Pyongyang	Pyongyang
2 882	13 digits	Pyongyang	Pyongyang
2 883	13 digits	Pyongyang	Pyongyang
2 885	13 digits	Pyongyang	Pyongyang
195	7 digits	Pyongyang	Pyongyang
31	6 digits	Pyongsong	South Phyongan
39	6 digits	Nampo	Nampo
41	6 digits	Sariwon	North Hwanghae
43	Unknown	Songnim	North Hwanghae
45	6 digits	Haeju	South Hwanghae
49	6 digits	Kaesong	North Hwanghae
53	6 digits	Hamhung	South Hamgyong
57	6 digits	Wonsan	Kangwon
61	6 digits	Sinuiju	North Phyongan
67	6 digits	Kanggye	Jagang
73	6 digits	Chongjin	North Hamgyong
79	6 digits	Hyesan	Ryanggang
85 29	4 digits	Rason	Rason
86	Unknown	Sonbong	Rason
29	4 digits	Rajin	Rason

== Mobile networks ==
- 0191 - Koryolink WCDMA Network
- 0192 - Koryolink WCDMA Network
- 0193 - SunNet GSM900 Network (discontinued in 2004)
- 0195 - Kangsong NET WCDMA, 4G LTE Network

== Number lengths ==
Location	Area code	Subscriber number	NSN length
Pyongyang (capital city)	2 digits (02)	7 digits	8 digits
Rason Economic Special Zone	3 digits (085)	6 digits	8 digits
Mobiles	4 digits (019X)	7 digits	10 digits

Little is known about phone numbers in the rest of the country, as phone numbers outside Pyongyang and Rason are not able to be dialled from overseas and are hence not advertised in any overseas publications.

== International dialing ==
Overseas callers to North Korea will usually need to go through the international operator service on +850 2 18111. A select few numbers (mostly fax numbers) are able to be dialled directly, without operator assistance.

Phone numbers in Pyongyang which can call internationally and which can receive calls internationally always begin with 381 in the local number, e.g. +850 2 381 xxxx. These numbers cannot be dialled domestically and cannot make calls domestically, so usually an organisation with international connectivity will have a 381 international number and a 382 domestic number. For example, the British Embassy in Pyongyang can be dialled as +850 2 381 7980 internationally and 02 382 7980 domestically. 381 numbers can, however, call other 381 numbers domestically.

Many North Koreans smuggle in mobile phones from China and use them near the border where they can take advantage of Chinese mobile networks that work there. The North Korean government has cracked down on illegal phones by deploying surveillance and jamming devices.

Many lines in the Rason Special Economic Zone can also be direct-dialled from outside the country, as many foreign companies (mostly Chinese and Russian) are active in the region.

Calls between North Korea and South Korea are banned, except to or from the Kaesong Industrial Region.
