= Sim Chol-ho =

North Korean engineer and politician

- 심철호

Deputy of the Supreme People's Assembly from Ongjin
- In office March 2014 – October 2014
- Leader: Kim Jong Un
- Constituency: 315

Minister of Post and Telecommunications of North Korea
- In office January 2012 – October 2014
- Leader: Kim Jong Un
- Succeeded by: Kim Kwang-chol

Vice Minister of Post and Telecommunications of North Korea
- In office December 2008 – December 2011
- Leader: Kim Jong Il; Kim Jong Un

Personal details
- Born: 5 July 1960 North Korea
- Died: October 2014 (unconfirmed) North Korea
- Party: Workers' Party of Korea
- Children: 2
- Education: Kim Il Sung University (M.Eng.)

Sim Chol-ho (Korean: 심철호; 5 July 1960 – October 2014) was a North Korean engineer and politician. He was a member of the Supreme People's Assembly and served as the Minister of Post and Telecommunications beginning in 2012. He has not been seen in public since October 2014, when he and six other officials disappeared in a purge connected to Supreme Leader Kim Jong Un. He was reportedly executed, though his death is unconfirmed.

== Early life and education ==
Sim was born on 5 July 1960. He studied at the Faculty of Automation at Kim Il Sung University in Pyongyang between September 1982 and August 1987, where he received his Master of Engineering.

== Career ==
From September 1987 to April 1995, Sim was the chief engineer at the Central Info-Communication Bureau. From May 1995 to November 2008, he worked as a manager and director of the Ministry of Post and Telecommunications. In December 2008, he was made Vice Minister of Post and Telecommunications, a position he held until December 2011. In 2010, he was named a member of the Central Auditing Commission of the Workers' Party of Korea.

In January or February 2012, he became Minister of Post and Telecommunications. In that office, one of his main roles was overseeing the North Korean mobile phone network, Koryolink. In April 2013, he was reconfirmed as minister by the 13th Supreme People's Assembly. This was the last time he appeared in state media. In March 2014, Sim was elected to the Supreme People's Assembly for the Ongjin constituency. He, along with other close associates of the late Kim Jong Il, were reportedly put in the Assembly to help maintain a stable relationship between Kim Jong Un and older leading officials.

== 2014 purge and reported execution ==
On 23 October 2014, a source told the South Korean newspaper JoongAng Ilbo that they had received "reliable information" that six minister-level officials had been purged from the government and executed. Among the ministers listed were Sim, Ma Won-chun, General Ri Pyong-chol, Chang Ung, and Ri Yong-gil. Sim did not appear often in state media, but his absence from a meeting of North Korean officials with Naguib Sawiris, head of the Egyptian company Orascom Telecom, which provides North Korea's mobile network, was considered unusual. He has not been seen publicly since 2014, but his execution remains unconfirmed.

== Personal life ==
Sim was married with two children. He spoke both Korean and English.

== See also ==
- List of people who disappeared mysteriously: post-1970
