= Kim Jeong-ju =

Kim Jeong-ju or Kim Jong-ju may refer to:

- Kim Jong-ju (1903–1978), North Korean politician
- Kim Jung-ju (1968−2022), South Korean businessman
- Kim Jung-joo (born 1981), South Korean boxer
- Kim Jung-joo (footballer) (born 1991), South Korean football player
