= Ullim =

Line of tablet computers

- Manufacturer: Pyongyang Informatics Company
- Released: 2014
- Operating system: Android
- CPU: @ 1.5 GHz

Ullim (Korean: 울림, lit. 'echo') is a brand name of an Android-based tablet computers family which is sold in North Korea.

== History ==
The first of the Ullium tablet line were introduced in 2014.

The tablet is based on a tablet called Z100 which is produced by Chinese company called Hoozo. The tablets, however, are modified for greater control, over the government-approved intranet Kwangmyong.

In 2015, the tablet started production.

== Specifications ==
The "Ullim" tablet is one of four tablet devices marketed by separate companies in North Korea.

It is on sale for 120 US dollars for a 7-inch model, and 210 US dollars for a 10.1-inch model. Both units have a 1.5-GHz (gigahertz) dual core CPU (central processing unit).

=== Operating system ===
The operating system on which the tablet runs is Android version 4.4.2 "KitKat". It has modifications which gives the government significantly more control over by whom can the intranet be accessed.

Users require a dongle to access intranet by Wi-Fi, LAN or dial-up.

The tablet PC can access the Kwangmyong intranet through Wi-Fi.

=== Apps ===
The tablet have basic apps like gallery though none of the Google apps such as Gmail are available.

Applications for education, cooking and games are pre-installed. It is also loaded with a local set of apps to match Microsoft Office – North Korea's software suite called "Changdok".

=== Control of use ===
The tablet has a level of surveillance and control which was not previously seen in North Korean electronics.

The "Red Flag" program which runs as a background process captures a screenshot every time the user opens an application, records the browser history and ensures that the core operating system is not modified. The installation of applications is limited to an approved whitelist.

The devices also come with "Trace Viewer", a software that stores data and prevents users from deleting data.

The tablet is able to access media only if it has the digital certificate either NATISIGN (authorized by the North Korean government) or SELFSIGN (created on the tablet itself).

The table features watermarking of created files. Each of the created documents contains "fingerprints" of the device/owner.

== Sales ==
In 2016, it was reported that the demand for the tablet exceeded the available supply.

In response, the government restricted sales of the device. The state also mandated that nobody can buy more than one tablet. This resulted in used tablets being sold roughly for original price.

== See also ==
- Samjiyon tablet computer
- Arirang (smartphone)
- Notel
- Internet in North Korea
- Telecommunications in North Korea
