= SunNet =

Former North Korean telecommunications company

SunNet (Korean: 썬넷) was a North Korean telecommunications company that provided 2G GSM wireless services to Pyongyang. Founded in 2002, it was North Korea's first wireless provider. Only 1,024 IP addresses have been registered for government use while the general population is limited to the national intranet service known as Kwangmyong. Access to the network was banned for many people in 2004 following the Ryongchon disaster. Operations ceased in 2010 when it was replaced by Koryolink.
