= Telephone numbers in Korea =

Telephone numbers in Korea may refer to:

- Telephone numbers in North Korea
- Telephone numbers in South Korea
