= Sili Bank =

North Korean company

- Industry: Information technology
- Founded: September 12, 2001
- Headquarters: Pyongyang, North Korea; Shenyang, China
- Area served: North Korea, China
- Parent: Workers' Party of Korea
- Website: silibank.com (archived)

Sili Bank

Chinese name
- Traditional Chinese: 實利銀行
- Simplified Chinese: 实利银行
- Literal meaning: True Profit Bank
Transcriptions
Standard Mandarin
- Hanyu Pinyin: Shílì Yínháng

Korea 626 Shenyang Co.
- Traditional Chinese: 朝鮮626技術服務所瀋陽辦事處
- Simplified Chinese: 朝鲜626技术服务所沈阳办事处
Transcriptions
Standard Mandarin
- Hanyu Pinyin: Cháoxiǎn 626 jìshù fúwù suǒ shěnyáng bànshì chù

Korean name
- Hangul: 실리은행

Alternative Korean name
- Hangul: 626기술봉사소

Sili Bank, also known as Korea 626 Shenyang Co., is a North Korean financial company that provides email services in North Korea through its silibank.net.kp domain.

Sili Bank (sili meaning "true profit" in both Chinese and Korean) was established on September 12, 2001. Through its operation centre in Chilbosan Hotel in Shenyang, China, it offered a limited email relay service to and from North Korea, where Internet access was and is scarce. It initially charged a fee per every email sent.

The Chilbosan Hotel has also served as a centre of North Korean computer hacking and cyber-warfare operations.

== See also ==
- Communications in North Korea
