= Kwangmyong (network) =

North Korean intranet service

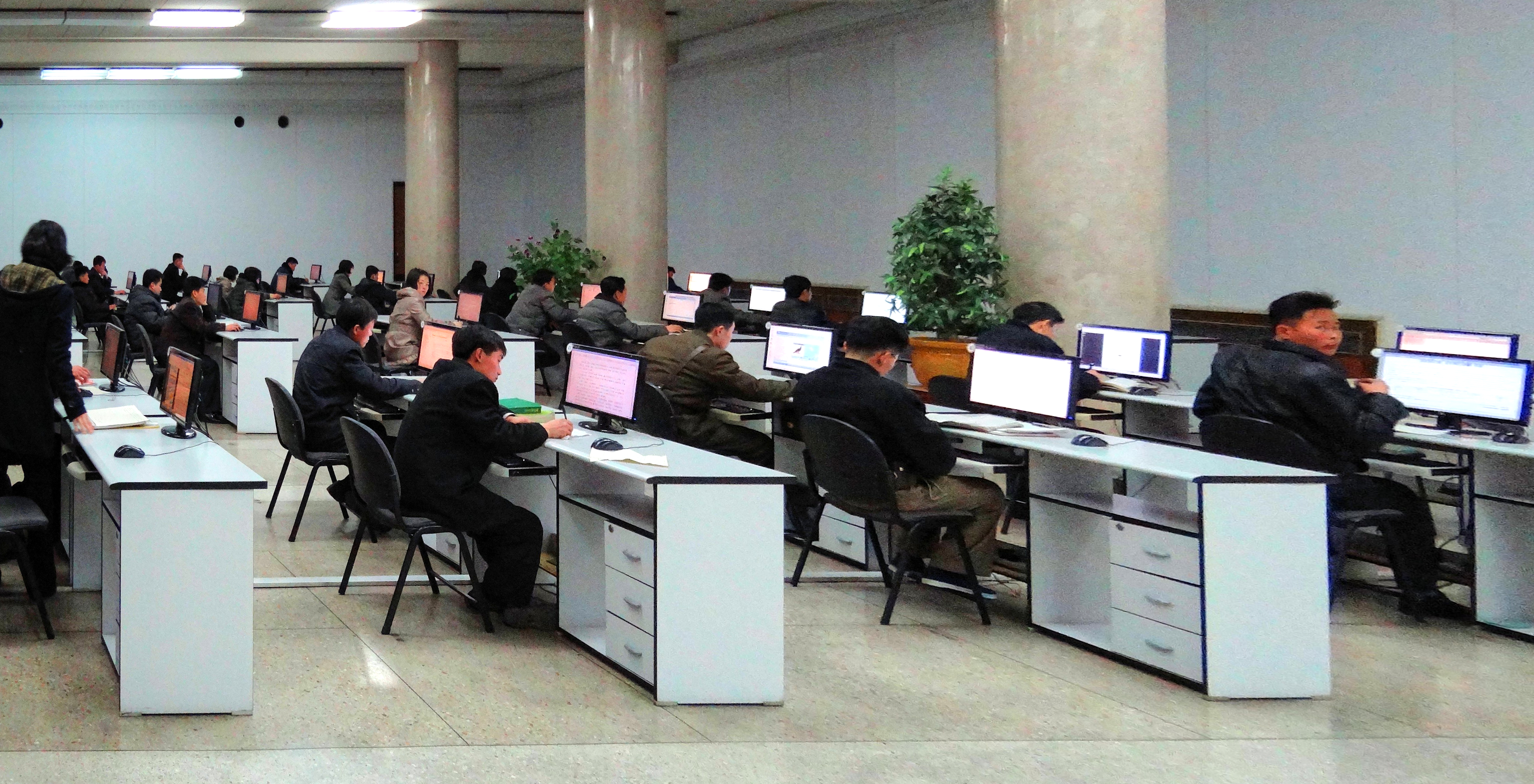
- A computer room with access to Kwangmyong at the Grand People's Study House in Pyongyang

Korean name
- Hangul: 광명
- Hanja: 光明
- RR: Gwangmyeong
- MR: Kwangmyŏng
- IPA: [kwa̠ŋ.mjʌ̹ŋ]

Kwangmyong (Korean: 광명; lit. 'bright light') is a North Korean national intranet service opened in the early 2000s. The Kwangmyong intranet system stands in contrast to the global Internet in North Korea, which is available to fewer people in the country.

The network uses domain names under the .kp top level domain that are not usually accessible from the global Internet. As of 2016, the network uses IPv4 addresses reserved for private networks in the 10.0.0.0/8 range, also known as 24-bit block as defined in RFC 1918. North Koreans often find it more convenient to access sites by their IP address rather than by domain name using Latin characters. Like the global Internet, the network hosts content accessible with web browsers, and provides an internal web search engine. It also provides email services and news groups. The intranet is managed by the Korea Computer Center.

== History ==
The first website in North Korea, the Naenara web portal, was made in 1996. Efforts to establish the Kwangmyong network on a national scale began as early as 1997, with some development of intranet services in the Rajin-Sonbong Economic Special Zone as early as 1995. The intranet was originally developed by the Central Scientific and Technological Information Agency. The national Kwangmyong intranet was first in service during the early 2000s. North Korea's first email provider was Sili Bank, established in 2001.

Prior to 2006, North Koreans would use intranet chat rooms to organize meetups to play sports, such as basketball. Following an incident where, to celebrate the 10th anniversary of Naenara, around 300 North Korean intranet users organized a flash mob at the Pyongyang Gymnasium, all chat rooms were removed from the North Korean intranet. Regional chat rooms reportedly made a return in 2015.

In 2013, Anonymous-affiliated hackers claimed to have broken into North Korea's intranet. However, evidence for the claim was lacking.

A video conferencing system called Rakwon was developed at Kim Il-sung University in 2010. During the COVID-19 pandemic, it became much more popular for remote meetings and appeared regularly on news bulletins. Telemedicine and remote education systems have been developed.

The first online shopping website was opened in 2015, and 22 such websites were available by 2021. The Central Bank of North Korea launched an electronic payment system in 2020.

== Content ==
As of 2014, the Kwangmyong network was estimated to have between about 1,000 and 5,500 websites. In 2021, Max Fisher of Vox estimated that the number was about 5,000. Excélsior also estimated the number at about 5,000 the following year.

The Kwangmyong network is composed of many websites and services. Some sites host political and economic propaganda. Scientific and cultural information and fields of knowledge among other topics can be found elsewhere. Over 30 million mostly scientific or technical documents were reportedly posted to the intranet as of 2007.

Websites of various North Korean government agencies including provincial government, cultural institutions, major universities and libraries, some local schools, and some of the major industrial and commercial organizations are accessible to users. The network also contains (mostly science-related) websites from the open Internet that are downloaded, reviewed and censored.

An internal emailing service is available on the Kwangmyong network. A search engine is in use for browsing the Kwangmyong intranet. The search engine reportedly goes by the name "Naenara", which means "Our Country". A Facebook-like social networking service in use by professors and university students existed as of 2013, and was used to post birthday messages. CNN reported in 2017 that a "North Korean equivalent to Facebook" exists. Message boards are known to exist on the network. An IPTV video-streaming service called Manbang (만방), Korean for "Everyone", was reportedly launched in August 2016, though the name Manbang appeared in North Korean technology as early as 2013. It is accessed by a Wi-Fi-enabled set-top box. It can be accessed through smartphones and tablet computers. Reportedly the Kwangmyong has been used for online dating.

Domestic state news services are available on the network, such as the Korean Central News Agency, Rodong Sinmun, and Voice of Korea. Scientific research websites of academic and scholarly works devoted to the network are served through web-based academic exchanges and information sharing such as the Academy of Sciences for Science and Technology (Korean: 과학기술전시관; Hancha: 科學技術展示館) and the Academy of Sciences for Medical Science (Korean: 의학과학정보센터). An electronic library is present on the network, which also hosts video lectures for various topics.

Some e-commerce and e-banking websites exist on the network. Some video games also exist on the intranet. One of the games available on the Kwangmyong is Korean chess. Phones provide access to e-books and mobile payment. Some cultural websites are among the few .kp domain websites which have been openly accessible to foreigners through the global Internet, such as at least one culinary site and one displaying the country's film industry. Other services in use on the intranet include dictionaries, telehealth, and text messaging services. Reportedly a travel website allowed North Koreans to plan vacations within the country.

== Network access ==
Kwangmyong is designed to be accessible only from within North Korea. Access is available within major cities and counties, as well as universities and major industrial and commercial organizations. For example, a library at the Pyongyang Sci-Tech Complex provides access to the intranet, and is reportedly used by different types of people, including factory workers, children and researchers for various purposes. About 3,000 computer terminals are usable there. The intranet is also accessible from another library at the Grand People's Study House.

Sites in the network are commonly accessed using 24-bit block private IPv4 addresses.

The first "internet café" (or "intranet cafe") in North Korea was opened in Pyongyang, where one may access the country's intranet services. It opened in 2002, near Kwangbok station, and has about 100 computers. It was opened by a Seoul company named Hoonnet, and a North Korean company named Jangsaeng General Trade Company. These cafes, also known as "PC rooms" or "Information Technology Stores", began appearing across North Korea as soon as the early 2000s, and can be accessed for a fee. The cafes provide other paid services as well, such as computing classes. As of 2005, the price for accessing these services was considered prohibitively expensive for the average North Korean citizen, according to Daily NK.

The process of installing an approved personal computer in North Korean homes which would be capable of accessing the intranet requires inspection and authorization from local government authorities. As of 2010, an estimated 200,000 such personal computers were in Pyongyang private homes, and access to the Kwangmyong is more common among people in cities compared to those in rural areas. A 2017 survey found that 19% of households had a computer but only 1% had a computer with access to Kwangmyong. The figure for households in possession of a computer with Kwangmyong access was 5% in Pyongyang. However, Kwangmyong can also be accessed on mobile phones. As of 2018, it was estimated that 18-20% of the population had mobile phones with Kwangmyong access.

Kwangmyong has 24-hour unlimited access by dial-up telephone line. In addition to access from personal computers, the national intranet may be accessed from mobile devices on 3G network. As of 2013, a number of Android-based tablet computer products, including the Samjiyon tablet computer, can be purchased in North Korea that give access to Kwangmyong. A 2017 estimate put the number of mobile phones in North Korea at between 2.5 and 3 million. In 2020, another estimate put the number of mobile phone users at 4.5 million. Mobile phones are the more common way for North Koreans to access the Kwangmyong intranet. Access to the global Internet or phone numbers outside of North Korea is not permitted aside from highest-ranked government officials and certain employees of the Korea Computer Center. Like personal computers, phones must be approved by authorities. According to Radio Free Asia, the government began requiring cell phone users to install surveillance software through an app to access the intranet in 2022. The app, called the Kwangmyong app, connects users to their subscriptions to the state-run Rodong Sinmun newspaper and other educational and informational services but also contains surveillance software which allows the Ministry of State Security and other law enforcement agencies to track their locations and see if they're accessing foreign content.

In 2018, North Korea unveiled a new Wi-Fi service called Mirae ("Future"), which allowed mobile devices to access the intranet network in Pyongyang.

In December 2023, North Korea started to deploy 4G network for mobile device to access the intranet network.

== Languages ==
The network uses Korean as the main interface language, though the government's web portal (Naenara), is multilingual. There is a dictionary available to users for translation between Korean and Russian, Chinese, English, French, German and Japanese, with a database containing at least 1,700,000 words, to assist users who may not be familiar with foreign languages.

Different websites on the intranet may be available in different sets of languages. A website that sells postage stamps is available in Korean, English, and Chinese. The writings of the Kim family are available in Korean, Japanese, Russian, and Chinese.

== Information control ==
Kwangmyong is designed to be used only within North Korea, and is referred to as an intranet. Kwangmyong prevents domestic users within North Korea from freely accessing foreign content or information and typically prevents foreigners from accessing domestic content. According to Daily NK, it "prevents the leak of classified data" and "functions as a form of information censorship, preventing undesirable information from being accessed". Thus, sensitive topics and information are unlikely to surface on Kwangmyong due to the absence of a link to the outside world and the censorship that occurs. Kwangmyong is maintained and monitored by government-related entities. However, large amounts of material from the global Internet ends up on Kwangmyong, following processing. The operating systems of government-approved phones reject access to any applications that are not also approved by the government.

While foreigners in North Korea are generally not allowed to access Kwangmyong, they may have access to the global Internet. For security reasons networks with Internet and intranet access are air gapped so that computers with Internet access are not housed in the same location as computers with Kwangmyong access.

Given that there is no direct connection to the outside Internet, unwanted information cannot enter the network. Information is filtered and processed by government agencies before being hosted on the North Korean Intranet. Myanmar and Cuba also use a similar network system that is separated from the rest of the Internet, and Iran has been reported as having future plans to implement such a network, though it is claimed that it would work alongside the Internet and would not replace it.

== List of sites ==
Below is a list of sites that were listed on Kwangmyong's website portal in 2016.

Category	Field	Site name	Domain	Site IP address	Is site on internet?
종합자료기지 (Comprehensive database)		과학기술전당 Science and Technology Complex	www.sciteco.aca.kp	10.93.0.3	No
종합자료기지 (Comprehensive database)		남산 (인민대학습당) Namsan (Grand People's Study House)	www.gpsh.edu.kp	10.30.80.101	www.gpsh.edu.kp
종합자료기지 (Comprehensive database)		광명 (중앙과학기술통보사) Bright Light (Central Information Agency for Science and Technology)	www.ciast.aca.kp	10.41.1.2	No
종합자료기지 (Comprehensive database)		열풍 (중앙과학기술보급부) Craze (Central Science and Technology Distribution Center)	www.stdc.gov.kp	10.30.71.67	No
부문별중앙자료기지 (Central database by field)	교육 Education	교육 (김일성종합대학) Education (Kim Il Sung University)	www.rns.edu.kp	10.42.1.5	www.ryongnamsan.edu.kp
부문별중앙자료기지 (Central database by field)	의학 Medicine	무병 (김일성종합대학 평양의학대학) Disease Free (Pyongyang Medical College of Kim Il Sung University)	www.mubyong.inf.kp	10.30.5.222	No
부문별중앙자료기지 (Central database by field)	공학 Technology	미래 (김책공업종합대학) Future (Kim Chaek University of Technology)	www.elib.ac.kp	10.30.50.5	www.kut.edu.kp
부문별중앙자료기지 (Central database by field)	건축 Architecture	평양건축종합대학 Pyongyang University of Architecture	www.pua.edu.kp	10.61.4.2	No
부문별중앙자료기지 (Central database by field)	건설, 설계 Construction, design	5.21 (국가설계지도국) 5.21 (Construction Design Information Center)	www.cdic.con.kp	10.10.5.99	No
부문별중앙자료기지 (Central database by field)	발명, 특허 Invention, patent	발명 (국가발명국) Invention (State Invention Office)	www.ipo.aca.kp	10.41.50.9	No
부문별중앙자료기지 (Central database by field)	상표, 공업도안 Brand, industrial design	척후대 (중앙산업미술지도국) Scout (Central Industrial Art Center)	www.tidgio.gov.kp	10.40.11.130	No
부문별중앙자료기지 (Central database by field)	규격 Standards	래일 (국가귝격체정연구소) Tomorrow (Korean National Institute of Standards)	www.knis.ipo.aca.kp	10.66.1.3	No
부문별중앙자료기지 (Central database by field)	체육 Athletics	우승 (체육과학원) Winner (Institute of Sports Science)	www.ssl.edu.kp	10.70.5.52	No
부문별중앙자료기지 (Central database by field)	산림 Forestry	황금산 (국토환경보호성 중앙양묘장) Golden Mountain (Central Tree Nursery, Ministry of Land and Environment Conservation)	hwanggumsan.edu.kp	10.192.3.2	No
부문별중앙자료기지 (Central database by field)	나노기술 Nanotechnology	나노기술 (국가나노기술국) Nanotechnology (National Nanotechnology Center)	www.nano.aca.kp	10.10.6.18	No
각도 도서관 Provincial libraries		불야경 (자강도도서관) Night View (Jagang Province Library)	www.fire.edu.kp	10.214.6.18	No
각도 도서관 Provincial libraries		분발 (함경북도도서관) Endeavor (North Hamgyong Province Library)	www.hambuk.edu.kp	10.205.10.100	No
각도 도서관 Provincial libraries		려명 (함경남도도서관) Dawn (South Hamgyong Province Library)	www.shplib.edu.kp	10.209.223.201	No
각도 도서관 Provincial libraries		철령 (강원도도서관) Choryong (Kangwon Province Library)	www.kwlib.edu.kp	10.224.4.10	No
각도 도서관 Provincial libraries		평안북도도서관 North Phyongan Province Library	www.pblib.edu.kp	10.217.1.10	No
각도 도서관 Provincial libraries		례성강 (황해북도도서관) Ryesonggang (North Hwanghae Library)	www.rsr.edu.kp	10.226.9.80	No
각도 도서관 Provincial libraries		황해남도도서관 South Hwanghae Library	www.shlib.edu.kp	10.229.0.35	No
각도 도서관 Provincial libraries		라선시도서관 Rason City Library	www.rslib.edu.kp	10.238.5.2	No
각도 도서관 Provincial libraries		와우도 (남포시도서관) Snail (Nampho City Library)	www.wud.edu.kp	10.232.101.2	No
원격교육기지 (Tele-education database)		룡남산 (김일성종합대학) Ryongnamsan (Kim Il Sung University)	N/A (not same website as 《교육 (김일성종합대학)》)	10.42.1.250	www.ryongnamsan.edu.kp
원격교육기지 (Tele-education database)		원종장 (김일성종합대학 평양의학대학) Wonjongjang (Pyongyang Medical College of Kim Il Sung University)	www.wonjongjang.edu.kp	10.30.5.133	No
원격교육기지 (Tele-education database)		리상 (김책공업종합대학) Ultimate Goal (Kim Chaek University of Technology)	www.risang.edu.kp	10.15.15.8	www.kut.edu.kp
원격교육기지 (Tele-education database)		모체 (평양기계종합대학) Moche (Pyongyang University of Mechanical Engineering)	www.moche.edu.kp	10.60.2.30	No
원격교육기지 (Tele-education database)		선행관 (평양철도종합대학) Sonhaenggwan (Pyongyang University of Railways)	www.sgh.edu.kp	10.192.131.100	No
원격교육기지 (Tele-education database)		충복 (장철구평양상업종합대학) Loyalty (Pyongyang Jang Chol Gu University of Commerce)	www.chungbok.edu.kp	10.40.4.130	No
원격교육기지 (Tele-education database)		인재 (한덕수평양경공업종합대학)\ Talent (Pyongyang Han Tok Su University of Light Industry)	www.iniea.edu.kp	10.20.66.3	No
원격교육기지 (Tele-education database)		정준택원산경제대학 Wonsan Jong Jun Thaek University of Economics	www.wieu.edu.kp	10.224.21.10	No
기타 Miscellaneous		김일성종합대학 Kim Il Sung University	www.rns.edu.kp	10.42.1.2	www.ryongnamsan.edu.kp
기타 Miscellaneous		불멸의 꽃 (조선김일성화김정일화위원회) Immortal Flower (Korea Kimilsungia-Kimjongilia Committee)	www.kfa.org.kp	10.66.5.11	www.naenara.com.kp/sites/kkf/
기타 Miscellaneous		클락새 (김일성종합대학 정보기술연구소) Kulaksae (Kim Il Sung University Information Technology Center)	www.kulak.edu.kp	10.50.25.3	No
기타 Miscellaneous		검은모루 (황해북도 상원군도서관) Black Anvil (North Hwanghae Province Sangwon County Library)	www.kmm.edu.kp	10.188.1.1	No
기타 Miscellaneous		고려의술 (고려의학과학원) Koryo Medicine (Academy of Koryo Medicine)	www.koryodoctor.inf.kp	10.76.1.18	No
기타 Miscellaneous		기둥 (청진광산금속대학) Pillar (Chongjin University of Mining and Metallurgical Engineering)	www.cimmu.edu.kp	10.205.1.5	No
기타 Miscellaneous		길동무 (함경북도과학기술룡보소) Companion (North Hamgyong Province Information Agency for Science and Technology)	www.hbiast.aca.kp	10.205.7.10	No
기타 Miscellaneous		과학 (국가과학원) Science (State Academy of Sciences)	www.sas.aca.kp	10.193.1.5	No
기타 Miscellaneous		과학기술전자전시관 (과학기술전시관) Science and Technology Exhibition House	www.stic.aca.kp	192.168.10.10	No
기타 Miscellaneous		광야 (인터네트중앙연구소) Open Field (Central Internet Institute)	www.cii.gov.kp	10.50.21.3	No
기타 Miscellaneous		로동신문 (로동신문사) Rodong Sinmun	www.rodong.ref.kp	10.10.3.100	www.rodong.rep.kp
기타 Miscellaneous		룡강군도서관 (남포시 룡강군도서관) Ryonggang County Library (Nampho City Ryonggang County Library)	www.rg.edu.kp	10.160.1.2	No
기타 Miscellaneous		류경오락장 (인공지능연구소) Ryugyong Recreation Area (Artificial Intelligence Research Institute)	www.ryugyong.inf.kp	10.70.7.133	No
기타 Miscellaneous		만방 (조선중앙방송위원회) Manbang (Central Broadcasting Committee of Korea)	www.krt.rep.kp	10.61.61.3	No
기타 Miscellaneous		만병초 (장철구평양상업대학 도서관) Manbyongcho (Pyongyang Jang Chol Gu University of Commerce Library)	www.manbyongcho.edu.kp	10.40.4.131	No
기타 Miscellaneous		목란 (목란광명회사) Mokran (Mokran Kwangmyong Company)	www.mokran.com.kp	10.30.0.85	No
기타 Miscellaneous		방역 (국가발명국) Quarantine (State Invention Office)	www.antivir.ipo.aca.kp	10.41.50.3	No
기타 Miscellaneous		법무생활 (최고인민회의 상임위원회) Legal Life (Presidium of the Supreme People's Assembly)	www.gpa.gov.kp	10.30.16.18	No
기타 Miscellaneous		불길 (평성석탄공업대학) Flame (Phyongsong University of Coal Mining)	www.pulgil.edu.kp	10.220.6.2	No
기타 Miscellaneous		붉은별 (붉은별연구소) Red Star (Red Star Research Institute)	www.osandok.inf.kp	10.70.7.132	No
기타 Miscellaneous		비약 (3대혁명전시관) Jump (Three-Revolution Exhibition House)	www.exb.edu.kp	10.50.19.1	No
기타 Miscellaneous		백두산 (백두산건축연구원) Paektusan (Paektusan Institute of Architecture)	www.paekdusan.com.kp	10.30.3.34	No
기타 Miscellaneous		상연 (상업과학연구소) Performance (Institute of Commercial Science)	www.sangyon.aca.kp	10.30.30.30	No
기타 Miscellaneous		선구자 (함경남도과학기술룡보소) Pioneer (South Hamgyong Province Information Agency for Science and Technology)	www.hnst.aca.kp	10.209.225.2	No
기타 Miscellaneous		신고 (인민보안부) Report (Ministry of People's Security)	www.singo.law.kp	10.250.2.100	No
기타 Miscellaneous		신기 (계명기술개발소) Mystical Energy (Kyemyong Technology Development Company)	www.singi.com.kp	10.30.80.131	No
기타 Miscellaneous		실리 (평양광명정보기술사) Profit (Pyongyang Kwangmyong IT Corporation)	N/A	10.10.1.15	No
기타 Miscellaneous		실리왁찐 (평양광명정보기술사) Profit Antivirus (Pyongyang Kwangmyong IT Corporation)	www.sv.com.kp	10.10.1.16	No
기타 Miscellaneous		새별기술교류사 (새별기술교류사) Saebyol Technology Exchange Company	www.saybyol.com.kp	10.76.1.50	No
기타 Miscellaneous		새세기 (중앙과학기술통보사) New Century (Central Information Agency for Science and Technology)	www.newcentury.aca.kp	10.41.1.10	No
기타 Miscellaneous		생명 (의학과학정보기술사) Life (Medical Science and Technology Corporation)	www.icms.hea.kp	10.65.3.2	No
기타 Miscellaneous		장자강 (자강도전자업무연구소) Jangjagang (Jagang Province Electronic Business Research Institute)	www.ikic.inf.kp	10.214.1.51	No
기타 Miscellaneous		전만봉 (희천공업대학) Jonmanbong (Huichon University of Telecommunications)	www.hut.edu.kp	10.126.0.10	No
기타 Miscellaneous		정보21 (평양정보기술국) Data 21 (Pyongyang Information Technology Bureau)	www.pic.com.kp	10.21.1.22	No
기타 Miscellaneous		조선료리 (조선료리협회) Korean Dishes (Korea Cooking Association)	www.cooks.org.kp	10.10.6.40	www.cooks.org.kp
기타 Miscellaneous		조선중앙통신 (조선중앙통신사) Korean Central News Agency	www.kcn.inf.kp	10.22.1.50	www.kcna.kp
기타 Miscellaneous		중앙버섯연구소 (국가과학원 중앙버섯연구소) Central Mushroom Research Institute (State Academy of Sciences Central Mushroom Research Institute)	www.mushroom.aca.kp	10.20.7.2	No
기타 Miscellaneous		지향 (함흥화학공업대학) Aim (Hamhung University of Chemical Engineering)	www.huct.edu.kp	10.208.1.2	No
기타 Miscellaneous		진달래 (만경대정보기술사) Jindallae (Mangyongdae IT Corporation)	www.mit.com.kp	10.76.12.2	No
기타 Miscellaneous		창성군도서관 (평안북도 창성군도서관) Changsong County Library (North Phyongan Province Changsong County Library)	www.cslib.edu.kp	10.145.2.2	No
기타 Miscellaneous		창전 (대동강건재공장) Changjon (Taedonggang Building Materials Factory)	www.changjon.com.kp	10.90.6.100	No
기타 Miscellaneous		천리마 (중앙정보통신국) Chollima (Central Information and Communications Center)	www.pt.net.kp	172.16.11.23	No
기타 Miscellaneous		천리마타일공장 (천리마타일공장) Chollima Tile Factory	www.taedonggangtile.com.kp	10.159.127.15	No
기타 Miscellaneous		철벽 (정보보안연구소) Iron Wall (Information Security Research Center)	www.oun.inf.kp	10.76.1.25	No
기타 Miscellaneous		체콤기술합영회사 (체콤기술합영회사) Checom Technology Joint Venture Company	www.checom.net.kp	10.40.5.4	No
기타 Miscellaneous		평북 (평안북도전자업무연구소) Phyongbuk (North Phyongan Province Electronic Business Research Institute)	www.pyongbuk.inf.kp	10.217.12.2	No
기타 Miscellaneous		평양성 (평양정보기술국) Pyongyangsong (Pyongyang Information Technology Bureau)	www.ca.pic.co.kp	10.21.1.53	No
기타 Miscellaneous		평양택견 (태권도성지관) Pyongyang Taekkyon (Taekwondo Sanctuary)	www.taekwon-do.edu.kp	10.70.7.18	No
기타 Miscellaneous		포부 (평북종합대학 농업대학) Aspiration (Agricultural College of Phyongbuk University)	www.phobu.edu.kp	10.217.7.50	No
기타 Miscellaneous		푸른주단 (국가과학원 잔디연구분원) Blue Silk (State Academy of Sciences Turf Branch Institute)	www.iandi.aca.kp	10.72.1.2	No
기타 Miscellaneous		품질 (국가품질감독위원회) Quality (State Commission of Quality Management)	www.saqm.gov.kp	10.80.2.40	No
기타 Miscellaneous		학무정 (자강도 전천군도서관) Hakmujong (Jagang Province Jonchon County Library)	www.hmj.edu.kp	10.127.131.5	No
기타 Miscellaneous		울림 (평양정보기술국) Echo (Pyongyang Information Technology Bureau)	N/A	10.30.18.30	No
기타 Miscellaneous		해당화관 (해당화교류사) Haedanghwakwan (Haedanghwa Exchange Company)	www.hdh.com.kp	10.76.1.3	No
기타 Miscellaneous		해양 (륙해운성) Ocean (Ministry of Land and Maritime Transport)	www.mlmt.rai.kp	10.30.33.2	www.ma.gov.kp
기타 Miscellaneous		아리랑 (5월11일공장) Arirang (May 11 Factory)	www.arirang.com.kp	10.30.71.91	No
기타 Miscellaneous		아침 (조선과학기술총련맹 중앙위원회) Morning (Central Committee of the General Federation of Science and Technology of Korea)	www.kwust.org.kp	10.30.5.3	No
기타 Miscellaneous		옥류 (인민봉사총국) Okryu (People's Service General Bureau)	N/A	10.10.1.14	No
기타 Miscellaneous		우주 (위성정보봉사지점) Space (Satellite Information Service Branch)	www.space.aca.kp	10.50.5.5	No
기타 Miscellaneous		원산농업종합대학 Wonsan University of Agriculture	N/A	10.224.121.100	No

Below is a list of sites that are not directly listed on www.sciteco.aca.kp (the Kwangmyong website portal) in 2016 and sites that have been confirmed to have been created on Kwangmyong after 2016.

Site name in Korean	Site name translation to English	Purpose	Domain	Site IP address	Reference (s)
《만물상》	General Store	E-commerce	manmulsang.com manmulsang.com.kp	10.99.1.11	
《관광》	Tourism	Domestic tour order	Unknown	Unknown	
《조선우표》 《조선우표사》	Korea Stamps	North Korea's stamp information	Unknown	10.99.1.75	
《은정》	Affection	Cloud computing service	Unknown	Unknown	
《은파산》	Silver Mountain	E-commerce	unphasan.com.kp	Unknown	
《생물공학》	Bio-engineering	Biotechnology development	Unknown	Unknown	
《푸른 산》	Blue Mountain	Forestry information	Unknown	Unknown	
《황금산》	Golden Mountain	Forestry information	Unknown	Unknown	
《이채어경》	Brilliant Fishing	Fishing information	Unknown	10.193.6.3	
《봄향기》	Spring Fragrance (or Spring Scent)	Online shop for Pomhyanggi-brand cosmetics	bomhyanggi.com	Unknown	
《황금벌》 (Note: The website’s name is romanized as “Hwanggumbol”.)	Golden Field	Agricultural science and technology information	Unknown	Unknown	
《자강력》	Self-development	Job recruitment service	Unknown	Unknown	
《생활의 벗》	Friend of Life	Movie watching	Unknown	Unknown	
《체육열풍》	Sports Craze	Sport information	Unknown	Unknown	
Unknown	Unknown	Pyongyang Orphanage's website; children health information	Unknown	Unknown	
《룡남산법률사무소》의 홈페지	Ryongnamsan Law Office	Legal service	Unknown (Note: "Unofficial homepage" (introduction page) at Kim Il Sung University’s internet page.)	Unknown	
《옥류》	Okryu	E-commerce	Unknown	Unknown	
《내나라》	My Nation	Naenara Information Center	Unknown	10.76.1.11; 10.99.1.162	
Unknown	Dawn	Pyongyang Department Store No. 1’s online shop	store.com.kp (Note: Mail server domain, possibly the domain of the website.)	Unknown	
《광명》	Bright Light	Unknown	Unknown (Note: Possibly the same domain as “Bright Light (Central Information Agency for Science and Technology)” (《광명 (중앙과학기술통보사)》) website.)	10.50.27.2	
《추첨》	Raffle	Sport lottery	Unknown	Unknown	
《선구자》	Trailbrazer	Unknown	Unknown	10.208.0.34	
《한마음》	One Mind	Osan Information Center's page	Unknown	10.76.1.20	
《북극성》	North Pole Star	National Network Information Center's page	Unknown	10.76.1.2	
《고려의술》	Korean Woods	Unknown	Unknown	10.76.1.18	
《릉라》	Rungna	Rungna Program Center's page	Unknown	172.16.4.200	
《비와》	Rain (or Flight)	Kim Chaek University of Technology’s subpage (?)	Unknown	10.15.15.5	
Unknown (Note: The website’s name is romanized as “Samcholligumsugangsan”.)	Unknown	Industrial design production	Unknown	Unknown	
Unknown (Note: The website’s name is romanized as “Kongang”)	Health	Online pharmacy	Unknown	Unknown	
《평양》	Pyongyang	Unknown	Unknown	10.99.0.88	
《아리랑》	Arirang	Unknown	Unknown	10.99.1.146	
《원격교육》	Remote Education	Unknown	Unknown	10.99.0.99	
《광홍》 (Note: The website’s name is romanized as “Kwangmyong”.)	Unknown	Unknown	Unknown	10.99.1.50	
《의무》	Duty	Unknown	Unknown	10.99.1.82	
《초원》	Prairie	Unknown	Unknown	10.99.1.202	
《고러이도로시》	Unknown	Unknown	Unknown	Unknown	
Unknown	Unknown	Unknown	Unknown	10.30.99.87	
Unknown	Unknown	Unknown	Unknown	193.10.0.10	

== See also ==
- Internet in North Korea
- Internet censorship in North Korea
- Red Star OS
- Telecommunications in North Korea
