= Kim Kwang-chol =

North Korean politician (fl. 21st century)

- 김광철

Minister of Posts and Telecommunications

14th term
- In office 11 April 2019 – 18 January 2021
- President: Kim Jong Un
- Premier: Kim Tok-hun; Kim Jae-ryong
- Succeeded by: Ju Yong-il

13th term
- In office 2015 – 11 April 2019
- Chairman: Kim Jong Un
- Premier: Pak Pong-ju
- Preceded by: Sim Chol-ho

Personal details
- Citizenship: North Korean
- Party: Workers' Party of Korea

Kim Kwang-chol (Korean: 김광철) is a politician from North Korea. He has served as Minister of Posts and Telecommunications in the Cabinet of North Korea since 2015 and is a candidate for the Political Bureau of the Central Committee of the Workers' Party of Korea. He was the deputy to the 13th convocation of the Supreme People's Assembly.

== Biography ==
Prior to being Minister of Posts and Telecommunications he worked as director of the Telephone Bureau of Pyongyang City People's Committee, Taecheon Power Plant Director, Pyongyang Telephone Office Director, and Chesinseong Gaecheon City Post Office. In 2015, he was appointed as the Minister of Posts and replaced Sim Chol-ho. In May 2016, the 7th Congress of the Workers' Party of Korea was elected as a candidate for the Central Committee of the Workers' Party of Korea.
