= Samjiyon tablet computer =

North Korean Android tablet computer

Samjiyon
- Developer: Multimedia Technology Research Institute
- Type: Tablet computer
- Released: 2012
- Introductory price: US$200
- Operating system: Android 4.0.4
- CPU: 1.2 GHz
- Memory: 1 GB DDR3
- Storage: 8 or 16GB
- Display: 7 in, 1024x768
- Camera: 2 MP
- Connectivity: TV tuner, Cellular
- Weight: 250 g (8.8 oz)

The Samjiyon tablet computer (Korean: 판형 콤퓨터 삼지연; MR: p'anhyŏng k'omp'yut'ŏ Samjiyŏn) is a North Korean Android tablet computer developed by the Multimedia Technology Research Institute of the Korea Computer Center.

== Namesake ==
The tablet is named after the Samjiyon lake.

== Production ==
The computers are assumed to have been built in China, and the software has been localised for North Korea.

== Design ==
Samjiyon includes a browser with a support for the North Korean Kwangmyong intranet. However, there is no Wi-Fi support.

It is the first North Korean tablet able to receive television broadcasts.

Some apps reported to be available include:

- e-book library
- Calculator (수산기, 數算機)
- Games
  - Abstract strategy games
    - Chosun Jang-Gi (조선장기, 朝鮮將棋)
  - Rubber Slingshot shooting (고무총쏘기; Angry Birds Rio)
  - Rubber Gun Shooting. (Space Edition) (고무총쏘기 .(우주편); Angry Birds Space)
  - Rubber Gun Shooting 2 (고무총쏘기2; Angry Birds (video game))
  - Tank Recon 3D
  - Air Control
  - Racing Moto
  - Basketball shooting (롱구공넣기)
  - Fishing Joy (고기잡이유희)
  - Marbles game
- Word processor, spreadsheet editor, and slideshow apps
- Dictionary

=== Language support ===
It supports Korean, German, Russian, English, French and Japanese inputs.

== See also ==
- Ullim
- Arirang (smartphone)
- Notel
- Internet in North Korea
- Telecommunications in North Korea
