= Rüdiger Frank =

German economist (born 1969)

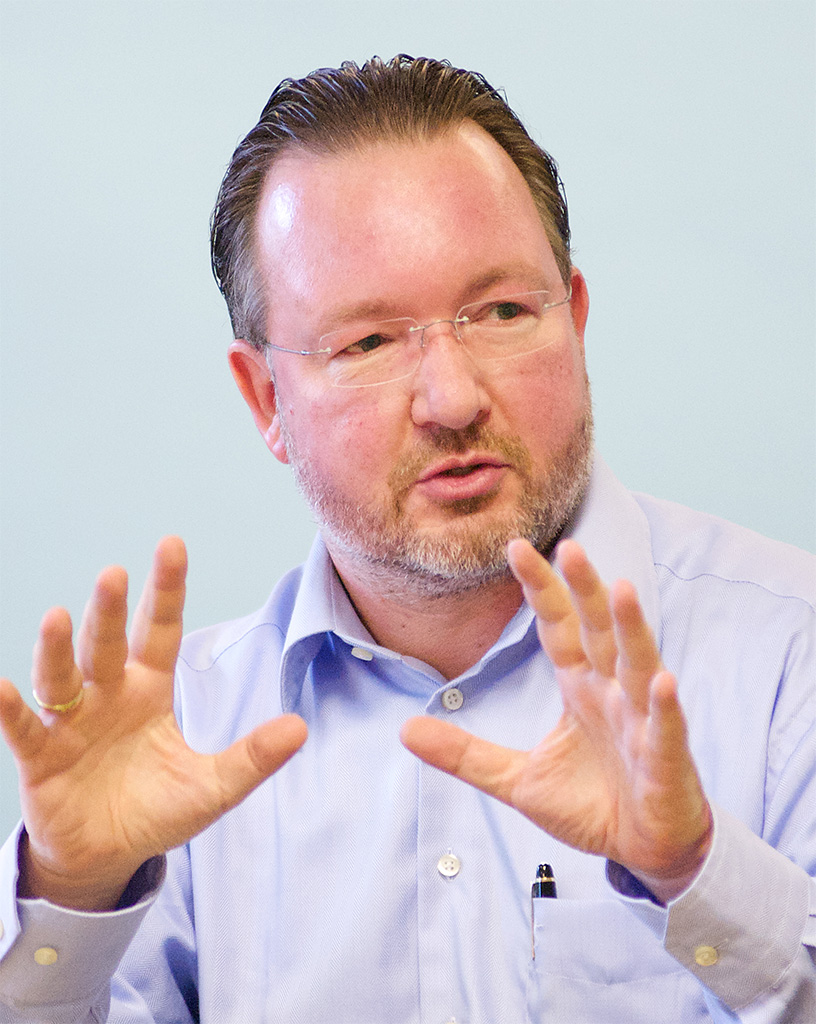
- Born: 1969 (age 56–57); Leipzig, East Germany
- Education: Kim Il-sung University; Humboldt University (MA, PhD); Mercator University
- Occupation: Professor
- Known for: North Korea; East Asian Studies

Academic background
- Thesis: Die DDR und Nordkorea der Wiederaufbau der Stadt Hamhùng von 1954 - 1962 (1996)

Rüdiger Frank (born 1969) is a German economist and expert on North Korea and East Asia. He currently lives and works in Vienna, Austria, as a tenured full professor of East Asian economy and society at the University of Vienna. Frank also serves as the head of the Department of East Asian Studies at the University of Vienna and is an adjunct professor at Korea University and at the University of North Korean Studies in Seoul.

Frank's main areas of research are socialist transformation in East Asia and Europe, with a focus on North Korea, state-business relations in East Asia, and regional integration in East Asia.

== Academic career ==
Born and raised in East Germany and the Soviet Union, and having spent one semester as a language student at Kim Il-sung University in Pyongyang in 1991–1992, Frank is one of very few experts on North Korea who have lived in and experienced East German, Soviet, and North Korean socialist systems for a substantial period of time. Frank received an MA in Korean studies, economics, and international relations, a PhD in economics at Humboldt University of Berlin, and habilitation from Mercator-University in Duisburg. Prior to his appointment as professor of East Asian economy and society at the University of Vienna, he taught at Columbia University's School of International and Public Affairs in New York from 2002 to 2003.

Frank uses his combined background in economics, Korean studies, and international relations to analyze and comment on a wide range of economic and security issues in East Asia and North Korea from various perspectives. In 2014, his insights into North Korea culminated in the book Nordkorea. Innenansichten eines totalen Staates.

Frank is chair professor of East Asian economy and society at the University of Vienna and head of the Department of East Asian Studies. He is also an adjunct professor at Korea University and at the University of North Korean Studies (Kyungnam University). His visiting professorships have included Columbia University, New York, and Korea University, Seoul.

In 2013, the Frankfurter Allgemeine Zeitung ranked Frank one of Germany's 50 most influential economists.

== Consulting ==
Frank is regularly consulted by governments, media, and business on North Korea and East Asia. This included consultancy work and a background policy paper for the visit by President of Finland Martti Ahtisaari, Prime Minister of Norway Gro Harlem Brundtland, U.S. President Jimmy Carter, and President of Ireland Mary Robinson to the Korean Peninsula and China.
