= Raekwon (name) =

Raekwon is a masculine given name. Notable people with the name include:

- Raekwon (Corey Woods; born 1970), American rapper and a member of Wu-Tang Clan
- Raekwon Davis (born 1997), American football defensive tackle
- Raekwon McMillan (born 1995), American football linebacker

== See also ==
- Rakwon
