= Kangsong NET =

North Korean telecommunications company

Kangsong Net
- Native name: 강성네트망
- Type: State-owned
- Industry: Telecommunication
- Founded: 2015
- Headquarters: Pyongyang
- Area served: North Korea
- Products: Telephony, Mobile Network Access
- Parent: Ministry of Information Industry

Kangsong Net (Korean: 강성네트망) is a North Korean wireless telecommunications provider that provides 3G mobile communication services. Unlike Koryolink which is a joint venture between Orascom Telecom Media and Technology Holding (OTMT) and the Korea Post and Telecommunications Corporation (KPTC), Kangsong NET is a state-owned network. It is owned and operated by the Ministry of Information Industry. It is the main competitor of Koryolink. Its headquarters is in Pyongyang.

Currently, the network is only provided to North Korean citizens. Its 4G LTE network service is currently provided to North Koreans to access the Kwangmyong Intranet Network.

== History ==
Kangsong Net was launched in 2015 with 3G network service.

In September 2023, the 4G LTE network service has been launched on a pilot basis using second hand equipment from Huawei. It has been commercially launched in December 2023, initially it was only available in some parts of the central area of Pyongyang City and other cities. By 2026 coverage appears to be far beyond the major cities, but does not extend to low-population areas.

== See also ==
- Koryolink
- Telecommunications in North Korea
