= Kim Jong-ju =

North Korean politician

Minister of Communications
- In office 9 September 1948 – 3 March 1953; 1st Cabinet of North Korea
- Premier: Kim Il Sung
- Preceded by: Post established
- Succeeded by: Pak Il-u

Personal details
- Born: December 9, 1903 Nyongbyon County, Heianhoku Province, Korea, Empire of Japan
- Died: 1978
- Citizenship: North Korean
- Party: Chondoist Chongu Party
- Education: Dongje University

Kim Jong-ju (Korean: 김정주, 金廷柱; born April 16, 1903) was a North Korean politician and activist in the Korean independence movement. Following the establishment of the Democratic People's Republic of Korea he became the first Minister of Communications in the Cabinet of North Korea.

== Biography ==
Born on April 16, 1903. He is from Hwangsan-ri, Puksinhyon-myon, Nyongbyon County, North Pyongan Province, the son of Hwajonmin. From 1909 to 1912, he attended elementary school in his hometown, where he studied natural science from 1912 to 1915. From 1915 to 1920, he worked on his father's farm, and in 1919 joined the youth organization to prepare for the March First Movement. From 1920 to 1922, he studied at Nyongbyon County Middle School. Since 1930, he has been the central member of the Chongu Party, and the leader of the Chongu Party was the pro-Japanese leader Choi Lin, who actively cooperated with the Japanese.

After North Korea was liberated following the Surrender of Japan, he served as Vice-Chairman of the People's Committee of Pongsan-myon and later Vice-Chairman of the People's Committee of Nyongbyon-gun. From October 1945 to January 1946, he actively participated in the reorganization of the Chongu Party based on the new Code, and was one of the activists who were actively involved in the founding of the Chongu Party. In February 1946, he was elected to the Central Committee and Vice-Chairman of the Central Committee. Since then, he has been a member of the party leadership. From August 1946 to October 1946, he visited the Soviet Union as a delegate. From February 1947, he served as the general secretary of the People's Committee of North Korea and was one of its members. Following the formal declaration on the establishment of North Korea in September 1948, he became the Minister of Communications in the North Korean Cabinet led by Premier Kim Il Sung.
