= Telecommunications in North Korea =

Telecommunications in North Korea refers to the communication services available in North Korea. North Korea has not fully adopted mainstream Internet technology due to some restrictions on foreign interventions.

== History ==
=== Telephone usage ===
By 1970 automatic switching facilities were in use in Pyongyang, Sinŭiju, Hamhŭng and Hyesan.

A few public telephone booths were beginning to appear in Pyongyang around 1990.

In the mid-1990s, an automated exchange system based on an E-10A system produced by Alcatel joint-venture factories in China was installed in Pyongyang.

North Koreans announced in 1997 that automated switching had replaced manual switching in Pyongyang and 70 other locales.

On 7 September 2002, the Ministry of Posts and Telecommunications announced the numbering plan for Pyongyang under country code +850: subscriber numbers under area code 2 were 381 XXXX (eight digits), 88X (four to ten digits) and 18X (four to six digits). The dialling plan issued the same year set the international prefix at 00, the national prefix at 0, and the national (significant) number length at 3 to 10 digits.

=== Mobile phone usage ===
In November 2002, mobile phones were introduced to North Korea and by November 2003, 20,000 North Koreans had bought mobile phones.

There was a ban on cell phones from 2004 to 2008.

In December 2008, a new mobile phone service was launched in Pyongyang, operated by Egyptian company Orascom, but the North Korean government immediately expropriated control of the enterprise and its earnings.

In May 2010, more than 120,000 North Koreans owned mobile phones; this number had increased to 301,000 by September 2010, 660,000 by August 2011, and 900,000 by December 2011.

Orascom reported 432,000 North Korean subscribers after two years of operation (December 2010), increasing to 809,000 by September 2011, and exceeding one million by February 2012. By April 2013 subscriber numbers neared two million. By 2015 the figure had grown to three million.

In 2011, 60% of Pyongyang's citizens between the age of 20 and 50 had a cellphone. That year, StatCounter.com confirmed that some North Koreans use Apple's iPhones, as well as Nokia's and Samsung's smartphones.

A survey in 2017 found that 69% of households had a mobile phone.

In November 2020, no mobile phones could dial into or out of the country, and there was no Internet connection. A 3G network covered 94 percent of the population, but only 14 percent of the territory.

In 2024, 38 North reported the number mobile phones models available had doubled since 2022, offering about 55 smartphone models generally with good mid-market specifications, some 4G, with at least 10 companies supplying them to consumers. In 2025, domestic production of cellphones was estimated to be at 500,000 a year. As of 2026, there are more than 50 different mobile phone brands in North Korea.

=== Television set usage ===
One estimate placed the total number of television sets in use in the early 1990s at 250,000 sets.

A study in 2017 found that 98% of households had a TV set. In 1997 there were 3.36 million radio sets.

=== National intranet usage ===
A survey in 2017 found that 19% of households had a computer, but that only 1% nationally and 5% in Pyongyang had access to the intranet. In 2018, it was estimated that 18-20% of the population had mobile phones with access to the intranet.

=== International internet access ===
Before the fiber connection, international Internet access was limited to government-approved dial-up over land lines to China.

In 2003, a joint venture between businessman Jan Holterman in Berlin and the North Korean government called KCC Europe brought the commercial Internet to North Korea.

The connection was established through an Intelsat satellite link from North Korea to servers located in Germany. This link ended the need to dial ISPs in China.

In 2009, Internet service provider Star Joint Venture Co., a joint venture between the North Korean government's Post and Telecommunications Corporation and Thailand-based Loxley Pacific, took control of North Korea's Internet and address allocation. The satellite link was phased out in favour of the fiber connection and is currently only used as a backup line.

== Telephone ==
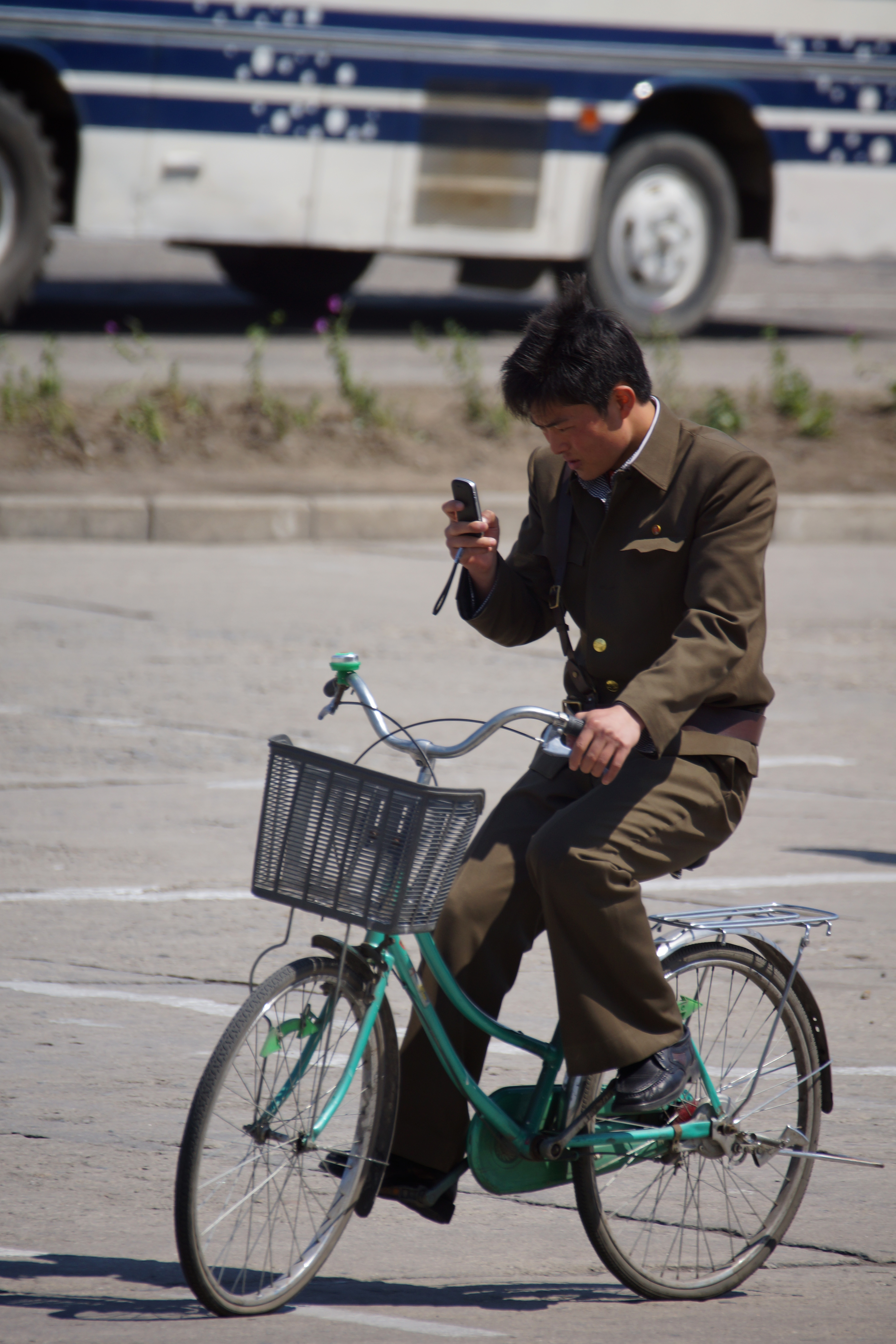
A cyclist using a mobile phone in Hamhung

North Korea has an adequate telephone system, with 1.18 million fixed lines available in 2008. However, most phones are only installed for senior government officials.

Someone wanting a phone installed must fill out a form indicating their rank, why they want a phone, and how they will pay for it.

Most of these are installed in government offices, collective farms, and state-owned enterprises (SOEs), with only perhaps 10 percent controlled by individuals or households.

North Korean press reported in 2000 that fiber-optic cable had been extended to the port of Nampho and that North Pyong'an Province had been connected with fiber-optic cable.

=== Mobile phones ===
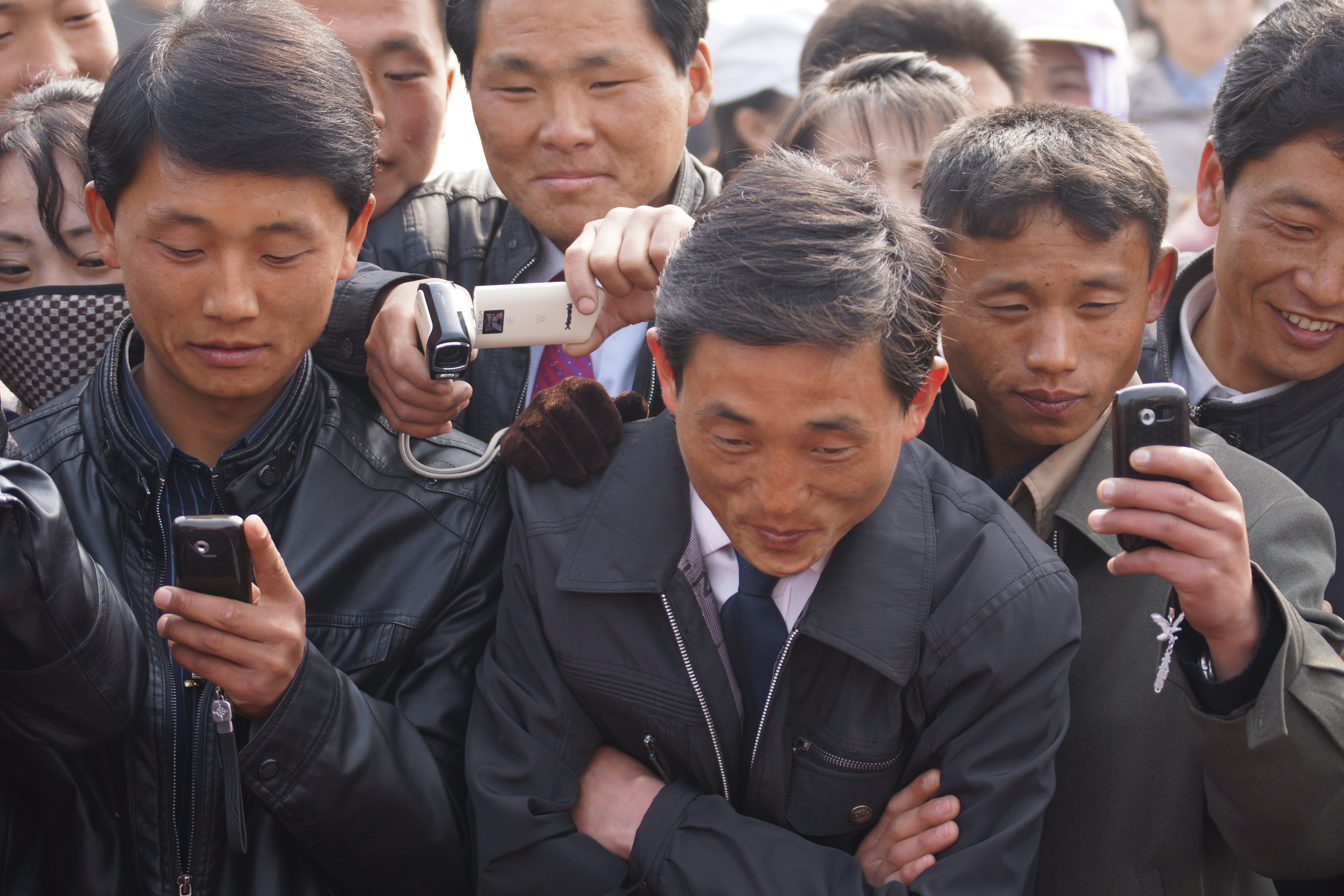
North Koreans with mobile phones, April 2012

There are two mobile phone network operators in North Korea, Koryolink and Kangsong NET. 4G was launched by Kangsong in September 2023, likely offering data speeds of around 10-30 Mbps, about ten times faster than the 3G networks. Network expansion is important to the government's effort to deliver more public services via mobile phones and to improve economic efficiency.

In 2009, the system was effectively under the control of the state-owned Korea Post and Telecommunications Corporation (KPTC).

==== Domestic models ====
North Korean mobile phones use a digital signature system to prevent access to unsanctioned files, and log usage information that can be physically inspected.

Smartphone apps such as mapping and navigation app Fellow Traveler are available.

Although state-run media reports that the phones were developed by North Korean outlets, they are likely sourced rather from a Chinese OEM and outfitted with North Korean software.

Some of the functionality was limited in line with state control measures by a localized version of Android. None of the smartphones were domestically manufactured.

In a country of about 24 million people there are an estimated 6.5-7 million mobile subscriptions, with use of digital payment apps popular.

=== International roaming ===
Koryolink has no international roaming agreements. Pre-paid SIM cards can be purchased by visitors to North Korea to make international (but not domestic) calls.

Prior to January 2013, foreigners had to surrender their phones at the border crossing or airport before entering the country, but with the availability of local SIM cards this policy is no longer in place. Internet access, however, is only available to resident foreigners and not tourists.

== Television ==
Broadcasting in North Korea is tightly controlled by the state and is used as a propaganda arm of the ruling Korean Workers' Party.

The Korean Central Television station is located in Pyongyang, and there are also stations in major cities, including Chŏngjin, Hamhŭng, Haeju, Kaesŏng, Sinŭiju, Wŏnsan. There are four channels in Pyongyang but only one channel in other cities.

Imported Japanese-made color televisions have a North Korean brand name superimposed, but nineteen-inch black-and-white sets have been produced locally since 1980.

== Radio ==
Visitors are not allowed to bring a radio.

As part of the government's information blockade policy, North Korean radios and televisions must be modified to receive only government stations.

When buying a TV set or a radio, North Korean citizens are required to register it with the state within 10 days. The apparatus also has to be inspected if this was not already done prior to sale. According to Amnesty International, there exist "strict restrictions" on the types of radios and other appliances households can own.

North Korea has two AM radio broadcasting networks, Pyongyang Broadcasting Station (Voice of Korea) and Korean Central Broadcasting Station, and one FM network, Pyongyang FM Broadcasting Station.

All three networks have stations in major cities that offer local programming. There is also a powerful shortwave transmitter for overseas broadcasts in several languages.

The official government station is the Korean Central Broadcasting Station (KCBS), which broadcasts in Korean.

Since 2011, the North Korean administration has repeatedly reported to the ITU Radiocommunication Bureau (BR) that high-power analogue television broadcasting stations in the Republic of Korea were causing harmful interference to its television broadcasting service on the frequencies 178, 186, 194, 202, 210, 218 and 226 MHz, and requested the Bureau's assistance; the relevant provisions are Article 45 of the Radio Regulations (formerly Article 197 of the ITU Constitution) and RR No. 23.3. The case was considered successively by the Board at its 62nd, 65th and 84th meetings. At its 65th meeting in March 2014, the Board noted that no new harmful-interference reports between the two Koreas had been received since August 2013, but that the case could not yet be closed, and instructed the Radiocommunication Bureau to continue monitoring and to report at the following meeting.

On 1 April 2020, the North Korean administration submitted a formal presentation to the Radio Regulations Board concerning harmful interference to its analogue television broadcasting stations (Document RRB20-2/11). The Board considered the document at its 84th meeting in July of the same year. The Radiocommunication Bureau had forwarded all of the North Korean reports to the Republic of Korea administration, drawing its attention to the relevant provisions of the Radio Regulations, but had received no reply. The Bureau's calculations showed that South Korea's emissions on 183, 189, 207 and 213 MHz exceeded the power level necessary to maintain an efficient and effective national service of good quality within its borders. Expressing concern that harmful interference on 186, 194, 210 and 218 MHz had continued since its 62nd meeting, the Board instructed the Bureau to convey its concern to South Korea and to seek its cooperation in resolving the cases, and urged the two administrations to show mutual goodwill and to settle the matter as a matter of high priority.

== Internet ==
=== National area network ===
Kwangmyong is a North Korean "walled garden" national intranet opened in 2000.

It is accessible from within North Korea's major cities, counties, as well as universities and major industrial and commercial organizations, with 24-hour unlimited access by dial-up telephone line and by 3G and 4G mobile network.

=== Domestic services ===
In August 2016, it was reported that North Korea had launched "Manbang" (meaning "everyone"), a state-approved video streaming service which has been likened to Netflix, to stream live TV, on-demand video and newspaper articles (from the state newspaper Rodong Sinmun) over the intranet.

The service is only available to citizens in Pyongyang, Siniju and Sariwon. The state TV channel Korean Central Television (KCTV) described the service as a "respite from radio interference".

In 2018, North Korea unveiled a new Wi-Fi service called Mirae ("Future"), which allowed mobile devices to access the intranet network in Pyongyang.

During the COVID-19 pandemic the Rakwon video conferencing system, developed at Kim Il-sung University, became popular for remote meetings, and appeared regularly on news bulletins. Telemedicine and remote education systems have been developed.

At the 2022 Plenipotentiary Conference of the International Telecommunication Union, the head of the North Korean delegation stated in a policy address that optical-fibre networks had been extended to the smallest administrative units, that mobile broadband had been established throughout the country, and that a digital television broadcasting network gave universal access to high-definition television services.

=== International internet access ===
North Korea's main connection to the international Internet is through a fiber-optic cable connecting Pyongyang with Dandong, China, crossing the China–North Korea border at Sinuiju. Internet access is provided by China Unicom.

In 2007 North Korea successfully applied at ICANN for the .kp country code top-level domain (ccTLD). KCC Europe administered the domain from Berlin and also hosted a large number of websites.

In October 2017 a large scale DDoS attack on the main China connection led to a second Internet connection taken into service.

This connects North Korea through a fiber optic cable with Vladivostok, crossing the Russia-North Korea border at Tumangang. Internet access is provided by TransTelekom, a subsidiary of Russian national railway operator Russian Railways.

Since February 2013, foreigners have been able to access the internet using the 3G phone network.

In December 2023, North Korea started to deploy a 4G network using second-hand 4G networking equipment from Huawei.

=== Access to foreign media ===
"A Quiet Opening: North Koreans in a Changing Media Environment", a study commissioned by the U.S. State Department and conducted by Intermedia and released May 10, 2012 shows that despite extremely strict regulations and draconian penalties North Koreans, particularly elite elements, have increasing access to news and other media outside the state-controlled media authorized by the government.

While access to the Internet is tightly controlled, radio and DVDs are common media accessed, and in border areas, television.

As of 2011, USB flash drives were selling well in North Korea, primarily used for watching South Korean dramas and films on personal computers.

== Internet cafes ==
North Korea's first Internet café opened in 2002 as a joint venture with South Korean Internet company Hoonnet. It is connected via a land line to China.

Foreign visitors can link their computers to the Internet through international phone lines available in a few hotels in Pyongyang.

In 2005 a new Internet café opened in Pyongyang, connected not through China, but through the North Korean satellite link. Content is most likely filtered by North Korean government agencies.

== Postal services ==
North Korea joined the Universal Postal Union in 1974 but has direct postal arrangements with only a select group of countries. The national postal operator is the North Korean postal service.

== International connections ==
North Korea has had a varying number of connections to other nations. Currently, international fixed line connections consist of a network connecting Pyongyang to Beijing and Moscow and Chongjin to Vladivostok.

Communications were opened with South Korea in 2000. In May 2006 TransTeleCom Company and North Korea's Ministry of Communications have signed an agreement for the construction and joint operation of a fiber-optic transmission line in the section of the Khasan–Tumangang railway checkpoint in the North Korea–Russia border. This is the first direct land link between Russia and North Korea.

TTC's partner in the design, construction, and connection of the communication line from the Korean side to the junction was Korea Communication Company of North Korea's Ministry of Communications.

The technology transfer was built around STM-1 level digital equipment with the possibility of further increasing bandwidth. The construction was completed in 2007.

=== Satellite connections ===
Since joining Intersputnik in 1984, North Korea has operated 22 lines of frequency-division multiplexing and 10 lines of single channel per carrier for communication with Eastern Europe. and in late 1989 international direct dialing service through microwave link was introduced from Hong Kong.

A satellite ground station near Pyongyang provides direct international communications using the International Telecommunications Satellite Corporation (Intelsat) Indian Ocean satellite.

A satellite communications center was installed in Pyongyang in 1986 with French technical support. An agreement to share in Japan's telecommunications satellites was reached in 1990.

=== Fiber optic lines ===
Following the agreement with UNDP, the Pyongyang Fiber Optic Cable Factory was built in April 1992 and the country's first optical fiber cable network consisting of 480 pulse-code modulation (PCM) lines and 6 automatic exchange stations from Pyongyang to Hamhung (300 kilometers or 190 miles) was installed in September 1995.

Moreover, the nationwide land leveling and rezoning campaign initiated by Kim Jong-il in Kangwon province in May 1998 and in North Pyongan province in January 2000 facilitated the construction of provincial and county fiber optic lines, which were laid by tens of thousands of Korean People's Army (KPA) soldier-builders and provincial shock brigade members mobilized for the large-scale public works projects designed to rehabilitate the hundreds of thousands of hectares of arable lands devastated by the natural disasters in the late 1990s.

== See also ==
- Ullim
- Samjiyon tablet computer
- Red Star OS
- Naenara
- Censorship in North Korea
- Media of North Korea
- Radio jamming in Korea
- North Korean postal service
