= Ministry of Posts and Telecommunications (North Korea) =

North Korean government ministry

Ministry of Posts and Telecommunications (MPT)
- 조선민주주의인민공화국 체신성

Agency overview
- Formed: September 9, 1948
- Preceding agencies: Posts and Telecommunications Bureau of the Provisional People's Committee of North Korea; Posts and Telecommunications Bureau of the People's Committee of North Korea
- Superseding agency: Ministry of IT Industry
- Jurisdiction: North Korea
- Headquarters: Oesong-dong, Central District, Pyongyang
- Agency executive: Ju Yong Il, Minister
- Parent agency: Cabinet of North Korea
- Child agencies: North Korean postal service; North Korean telecommunications

Korean name
- Hangul: 체신성
- Hanja: 遞信省
- RR: Chesinseong
- MR: Ch'esinsŏng

The Ministry of Posts and Telecommunications (MPT, Korean: 체신성), or Ministry of Communications as called by CIA in the 1950s, is a government ministry in North Korea which is responsible for the North Korean postal service, telephone system, and media such as television and print press. Additionally, the ministry is responsible for mint stamps. The ministry was a member of the Universal Postal Union, International Telecommunication Union and the Asia-Pacific Telecommunity.

In early May 2021, the Ministry of IT Industry took over the functions of the Ministry of Posts and Telecommunications, effectively replacing it.

== History ==
The predecessor of the Ministry was the Posts and Telecommunications Bureau of the Provisional People's Committee of North Korea and the Posts and Telecommunications Bureau of the People's Committee of North Korea.

Postal and telecommunications sector is showing a mixed development pattern, with light investment but heavy cooperation. In 1945, a report by the Joint Army-Navy Intelligence on transportation and telecommunications in the Korean Peninsula indicated that most telegraph offices in Korea were located within post offices, with only 175 dedicated solely to telegraphs and telephones. In cities and towns with telegraph facilities, telegrams are delivered by messengers. Elsewhere they are delivered by mail. In mid-September 1955, according to an engineer of the RFT-Fernmeldeanlage bau (Telecommunications Engineering Plant) in East Berlin, the telecommunications engineering plant in Arnstadt had received an order to furnish a telephone exchange with 300 connection units for North Korea. The exchange was to be delivered by October 1955. In November 1962, the U.S. Central Intelligence Agency, after analyzing data from 1957 and 1958, stated that only 8% of North Korea's total investment in the transportation sector was allocated to the postal and telecommunications sector.

- Telecommunication services largely stem from the remains of Japanese colonial rule and aid from the socialist bloc. The telecommunications net in North Korea was developed to serve the Japanese economy rather than as a part of a self-sustaining Korean economy. By 1954, communications were generally passed over wire lines, with radio in an augmenting role. Pyongyang is the communications focal point, with other economic centers serving as areal communications centers. Telecommunications are government-owned, and public use of the facilities is extremely limited: North Korea is dependent for almost all technical supervision and for equipment and parts upon the USSR and the European Satellites. Since the truce, wire rehabilitation on main lines has been pushed, using Soviet Bloc aid.
- Newspaper business was basically monopolized by the Ministry in the early years. On January 16, 1950, Minju Chosun reported that effective from January 1950, Inmin, the official monthly publication of the DPRK, will be distributed only to prepaid subscribers. The subscribers must pay in advance the fee of 40 won per issue. Due to limited issuance, the subscribers are asked to apply for subscriptions immediately at the following addresses:
  - In P'yongyang: Distribution Department, Central Newspaper Dispatch, Bureau of Publication Control, Ministry of Communications, c/o P'yongyang Central Post Office.
  - Outside P'yongyang: The newspaper distribution center in each province; or the newspaper section in city and county post offices.

Besides, in 2010, it was said that the ministry participated in a cyber-attack on South Korea using an IP address leased from China, yet some hold an opposite opinion on this issue.

The newly-established cabinet agency Ministry of IT Industry in 2021 was presumably reorganized from relevant departments in the information and communications sector, including the Ministry of Posts and Telecommunications.

== Ministers ==
- Kim Jong-ju: September 2, 1948 ~ March 1953
- Pak Il-u: March 1953 - November 28, 1955
- Chang-Hum Kim: November 29, 1955 ~ September 19, 1957
- Jun jun Ko September 20, 1957 ~ April 24, 1958 Choi Hyun April 24, 1958 ~ October 22, 1962
- Park Young-soon October 23, 1962 ~ December 16, 1967 Park Young-soon December 16, 1967 ~ December 27, 1967
- Kim Young-chae December 15, 1977 – 1980 Kim Young-chae 1980 ~ April 4, 1982, April 5, 1982 ~ December 28, 1986, December 29, 1986 ~
- Changho Kim May 24, 1990 ~
- Ri Kum Bom: September 5, 1998 ~ 2003
- Lee Geum-bum: September 5, 2000 ~ 2002
- Lee Geum-beom: 2002 ~ September 2, 2003, September 3, 2003 ~ July 2005
- Ryu Yong-sop (2005 英 燮): July 2005 ~ January 2009
- Sim Chol-ho: February 2012 ~ 2015
- Kim Kwang-chol: 2015 ~ 2021
- Ju Yong Il: January 17, 2021 ~ Present

The current minister is Ju Yong Il. Before that was Kim Kwang-chol, who was preceded by Sim Chol-ho, and Sim was appointed to the post in February 2012. Sim was reported executed in a February 2016 article.

== International ==
As early as 1 September 1946, North Korea established postal and telegraphic communications with the Soviet Union. As early as 1 January 1948, North Korea established postal and telegraphic communications with the Northeast Liberated Area of China.

=== Postal services ===
From 15 March 1946 until the eve of the outbreak of the Korean War, mail was exchanged between the two sides of the 38th parallel. After the war, fearing that such exchanges would lead only to an influx of subversive materials, South Korea rejected proposals to establish postal relations with North Korea. Nevertheless, in 1960, more than 80,000 pieces of mail from North Korea reached South Korea via third countries.

North Korea's postal service has a direct postal route with China Post. During the COVID-19 pandemic that began in 2019, the exchange of mail was suspended, and its resumption was not formally announced until 25 September 2025.

In addition, North Korea's postal service has had a transit postal route with Hongkong Post, and it formerly had a transit postal route with Japan Post.

=== Telecommunications ===
In the 1950s, North Korea and the People's Republic of China signed a package of agreements on telegraph and wire-line telephone communications, progressively specifying the types of circuits opened, their operation and maintenance, and the method of settling charges.

Since the turn of the century, mobile phone use has spread gradually across North Korea; locally manufactured handsets are fitted with a digital signature system, and there are no international roaming agreements. North Korea's main connection to the global Internet runs over the terrestrial optical-fibre cable between Pyongyang and Dandong, crossing the border at Sinuiju and operated by China Unicom; after the main Chinese link was struck by a large-scale DDoS attack in October 2017, a second cable was added between Khasan and Tumangang on the Russia–North Korea border, operated by TransTeleCom, a subsidiary of Russian Railways.

== See also ==
- North Korean postal service
- Telecommunications in North Korea
