= Notel =

Chinese brand of portable media player popular in North Korea

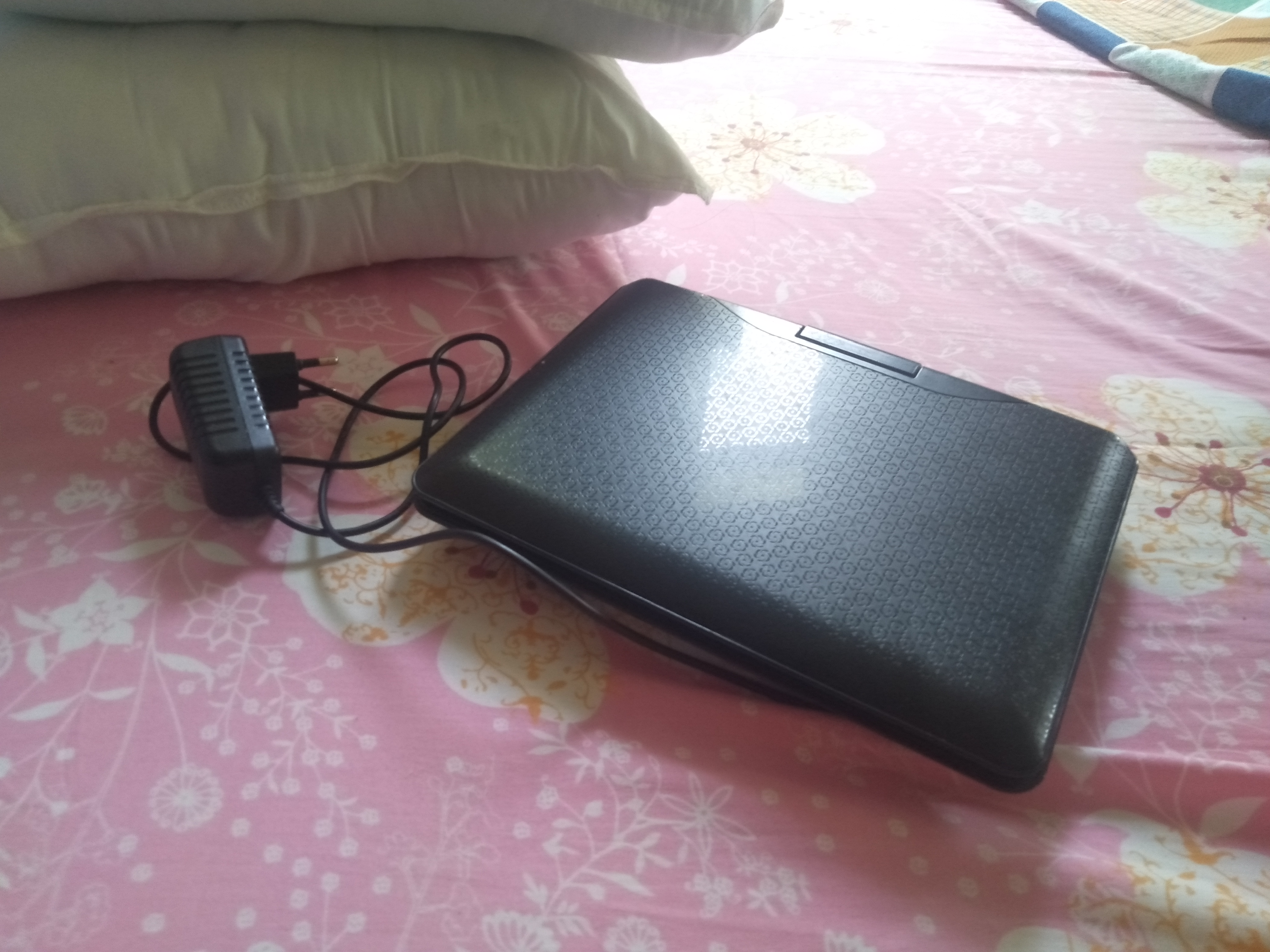
A Notel with its charger

Notel (Korean: 노텔), also called NoteTel, is a brand of portable media player made in China which is popular in North Korea. The word is a portmanteau of "notebook" and "television". It is estimated that up to half of all urban North Korean households have a notel.

The device has USB and SD ports, can play DVDs and EVDs, and contains radio and television tuners. It can also be powered and recharged from a car battery.

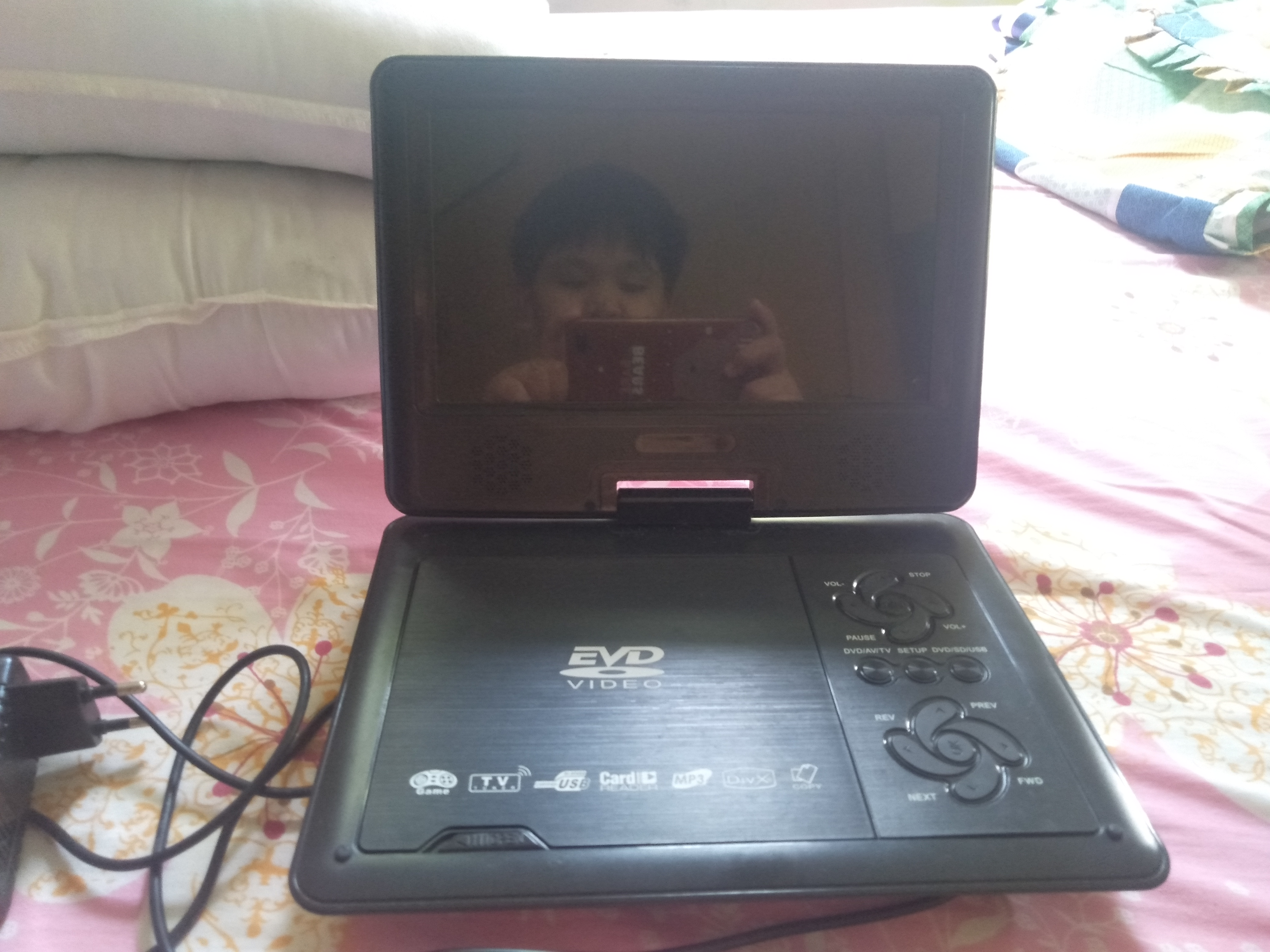
Opened screen, showing the screen itself and the disc tray alongside the controls

== History ==
Notels have been popular in North Korea since around 2005, significantly facilitating the extension of the "Korean Wave" (Hallyu, the increase of the popularity of South Korean pop culture internationally) into the isolated country.

In 2014, a notel's price was U.S. $65 though crackdown caused their prices to drop to U.S. $41. The devices were legalized in December 2014. As of 2015, they are available in some government stores (possession must be registered) as well as selling on the black market for around 300 Chinese yuan (ca. US$50), and are present in up to half of urban households, according to some estimations. In China, Notels are no longer popular as of 2015 due to the proliferation of smartphones, but sell well in the provinces that border on North Korea.

According to defectors, the Notel's multi-format support is used for evading detection of illegal media consumption: A North Korean disc can be placed in the device while a South Korean or foreign video is played from a USB drive or the SD card, which could be easily removed in case government inspectors arrive and check the device's temperature to see if it has been recently used, leaving the DVD disc as an alternative explanation.

== See also ==
- Censorship in North Korea
- Arirang (smartphone)
- Samjiyon tablet computer
