= Pyongyang Medical University =

Medical University in North Korea

- 평양의학대학
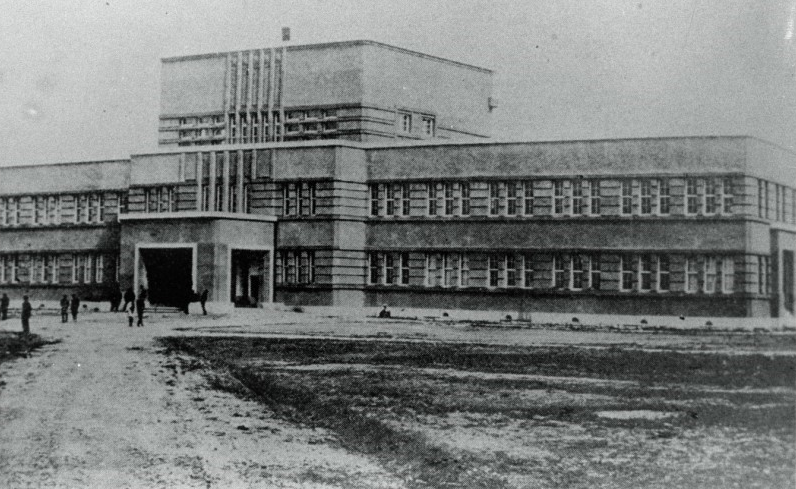
- Type: Public
- Established: 1948; 78 years ago
- Location: Yeonhwa-dong, Central District, Pyongyang, North Korea; 39.0104702254°N 125.743035551°E

Pyongyang Medical University is a public medical university located in Central district, Pyongyang, North Korea. Established in 1948, it is considered as the top medical school in the country.

== History ==
Following the separation of the Department of Medical Science at Kim Il Sung University in 1948, the Pyongyang Medical University was officially established by the North Korean government.
