= Mirae (Wi-Fi) =

North Korean Wi-Fi service

Mirae (Korean: 미래; lit. 'Future') is a North Korean WiFi service that enables mobile devices to access a state-sanctioned intranet network via a separate SIM card named Mirae and an app. Only websites approved by the North Korean authorities can be accessed.

In 2018, it was announced that people could access the national network through the "Mirae public wireless data communications network" smartphone app. The network was first installed on Pyongyang's Mirae Scientists Street. The network is available at various places in Pyongyang, including Kim Il Sung University, Kim Chaek University of Technology, Yonggwang, Ryomyong, Haebangsan streets and the Sci-Tech Complex.

The use of SIM technology ensures that authorities always maintain tight control on the network. This technology also makes it easier to track individuals' online activity. Other than Mirae, there are two cellular networks in the country that also provide wireless data service.

== History ==
In August 2018, Choson Sinbo reported that the Chunggu Haeyang (Marine) Unha Technology Exchange Company which is under DPRK's Central Information Agency for Science and Technology had developed a local public free wireless data network named as "Mirae" network. A technician at the company told the newspaper that the company had developed the network back in 2016, and that it launched the WiFi network in September 2017.

The first broadcast in which it was seen was on 21 October 2018, about a new tablet: Daeyang 8321 (대양8321). This was the first time that an outdoor Wi-Fi service had been mentioned in North Korean media. The second broadcast in which it was seen was on 8 November 2018: a report on the "Exhibition of IT Successes". It displayed Mirae network being accessed by an Arirang 171 smartphone.

The TV report claimed that network have data speed of up to 70 Mbps. However, an app for the service claims speeds between 2 Mbps and 33 Mbps. It also showcased how service was made available through outdoor Wi-Fi base stations.

On 26 October 2020 the Facebook page of the Russian Embassy in Pyongyang shared a scan of an article from the locally-distributed Pyongyang Sinmun. It showed the capabilities of "Naenara 101" ("My Country 101"). It had slots for two SIM cards, so it can be used to connect simultaneously to the mobile network and the public wireless network Mirae.

In 2023, it was claimed that every one out of five North Koreans or 20% of population are users of the country's Wi-Fi network. This is due to portable Wi-Fi devices and Wi-Fi modems provided by North Korea.

== Uses and impact ==
Rodong Sinmun content can be accessed over the Mirae WiFi network in North Korea. North Korean students can take classes at and download lectures from Kim Il Sung University via the Mirae WiFi network, beginning in 2018. Online-shopping outlet Manmulsang, video-on-demand service Manbang, Mokran video, the Sci-Tech Complex website, Yeolpung, Gongse, Korean Central News Agency (KCNA), a Netflix-style service called My Companion, and weather information can be accessed through the app.

Mirae connected Daeyang tablet PCs can be used to attend lectures, download study materials and take exams on their tablets. The network has been introduced to factories in the capital, which has claimed to "enable the students to study anywhere in the factories" and "turn all factories into classrooms", according to Naenara.

In the late 2010s, as the network grew popular the number of online games increased.

== State control ==
Subscribers are required to have a username, SIM Card, password and an approved device to gain access to the network. The network's settings cannot be changed by the user. The ability to search for other networks has been disabled. As a result, the tablet can be used to connect to the Mirae network but no others.
