= Rakwon =

North Korean Video-conferencing software

- Hangul: 락원
- Hanja: 樂園
- RR: Ragwon
- MR: Ragwŏn

Rakwon (Korean: 락원; lit. paradise) is a video conferencing software. It can be accessed through Kwangmyong. It was developed by the Kim Il Sung University in North Korea.

This virtual meeting system houses functions for sending videos and voice files, accessing electronic documents simultaneously, and for performing real-time multi-media tasks and virtual meetings. Due to the restrictions on travel in North Korea, the technology can prove to be instrumental in connecting people in remote areas with institutions located in the capital city.

Early photos of Rakwon indicate that it runs on North Korea's Linux operating system, Red Star OS. Newer versions of Rakwon seem to be working on Microsoft Windows.

== History ==
Rakwon was first reported by an article from Chosun Sinbo in January 2012, which claimed that the video conferencing software, developed by the Kim Il Sung University, won a gold prize at a technology festival in September 2011.

In 2019, Korean Central News Agency reported that the group that developed Rakwon had won the prestigious "February 16 Science and Technology Prize", a top national science and technology award in the DPRK, for that year. The report claimed Rakwon "had been introduced throughout the country".

The software wasn't mentioned in news releases until 2020. Throughout the COVID-19 pandemic, Korean Central Television regularly reported and highlighted use of the Rakwon software in workplaces and factories in the country.

The meeting on 23 June 2020, when Kim Jong Un led a preliminary meeting of the Central Military Commission via Rakwon, was the first time that an online meeting was managed by Kim as well as the first entirely online meeting.

In a news report, a meeting screen showed 37 organizations participants. The list indicated that Rakwon network was widely used by North Korea's industrial enterprises and now links together central and provincial government organizations.

In 2021, one of the biggest North Korean annual expos, the National Exhibition of IT Successes (전국정보화성과전람회), took place online through Rakwon. As nobody outside North Korea has access to the software, international video conferences are conducted with foreign video conferencing software.
