= Koryolink =

North Korean telecommunications company

Koryolink 고려링크
- Company type: Joint venture
- Industry: Telecommunication
- Founded: 2008
- Headquarters: Pyongyang
- Area served: Pyongyang, and 14 additional cities and eight highways and railways.
- Products: Telephony, Mobile Network Access
- Revenue: US$ 5.8 million
- Parent: Global Telecom Holding S.A.E. (75%); Korea Post and Telecommunications Corporation (25%)
- Website: intranet Homepage Kwangmyung

Koryolink (Korean: 고려링크, styled as koryolink) is a North Korean wireless telecommunications provider. The company is a cellular operator held by Cheo Technology, a joint venture between Orascom Telecom Media and Technology Holding (OTMT) which holds 75% of the shares, and the state-owned Korea Post and Telecommunications Corporation (KPTC). Koryolink started in 2008 and was the first 3G mobile operator in North Korea.

It offers service in Pyongyang and five additional cities as well as along eight highways and railways. Phone numbers on the network are prefixed with +850 (0)1912. Despite being a 3G network, there is no Internet access (only Intranet access) for domestic users. Although as of April 2014, mobile internet access for foreigners with limited speed or traffic amount was available at a comparably high price.

== History ==
Orascom Telecom Holding was awarded the license to establish a 3G mobile network in North Korea in January 2008. Koryolink has deployed its 3G network to initially cover Pyongyang, which has a population of more than two million people, with an ambitious plan to expand its coverage to the entire country.

When Koryolink launched, the move was controversial for Egypt-based Orascom as North Korea was under international sanctions since it led nuclear tests in 2006.

At network launch in December 2008, the network had 5,300 subscribers. Orascom reported 47,873 subscribers in June 2009, then 432,000 North Korean subscribers in December 2010, increasing to 809,000 by September 2011, and exceeding one million by February 2012. By April 2013, subscriber numbers neared two million. In 2011, 99.9% of Koryolink customers had 3G access.

In 2015 subscriber numbers exceeded three million and the network was profitable. However, the Government of North Korea refused permission to transfer profits from North Korea to Orascom and even started a second carrier (Kangsong NET) to compete with Koryolink. As a result, Orascom in its financial result reported, that it lost control over Koryolink's activities.

Following tightened sanctions on North Korea by the UN Security Council, Orascom was granted an exemption in September 2018 to continue with the Koryolink operations in North Korea. The United Nations Security Council Resolution 2375 was to be obtained by 9 January 2018 to keep Orascom's DPRK operations legal.

== Use by foreigners ==
On February 26, 2013, Koryolink made internet service available for foreigners, with a setup fee of €75 (≈ US$100), and €10 (≈ US$13.10) per month to keep a SIM card active. It cost €400 (≈ US$532) for 10GB of data, €250 (≈ US$333) for 5GB and €150 (≈ US200) for 2GB of data. (Note: The Euro/US dollar conversion is correct for 2013 when this service was active) about a month later, on March 29, this was discontinued. A Koryolink official stated that 3G internet service would still be available for certain long-term residents such as diplomatic staff.

== Government control ==
According to Orascom, the North Korean government has monitored all network activities since at least 2009. Only calls within North Korea are allowed on Koryolink. However, smuggled phones have been used just over the border in China to International Direct Dialing.

In February 2012, the government denied having banned users from the internet during the mourning period of Kim Jong-il.

In September 2014, Koryolink fixed a loophole that enabled its domestic users to get international calls and internet access designed for tourists only.

In 2016, Orascom admitted to have problems with repatriating profits because of international sanctions against North Korea, and stated that it was looking for a solution to this problem. It was suggested that a merger with state-owned carrier Byol could be on the table, yet "the resulting entity would not be controlled by Orascom, meaning that the Egyptian firm has already effectively ceded control of Koryolink."

== See also ==
- Kangsong NET
- Telecommunications in North Korea
