= Kim Il Sung University =

Public university in North Korea

- 김일성종합대학
- Type: Public
- Established: 1 October 1946; 80 years ago
- President: Kim Sung-chan
- Location: Ryongnam-dong, Taesong District, Pyongyang, North Korea; 39°3′29″N 125°46′6″E
- Campus: Urban
- Website: ryongnamsan.edu.kp

Korean name
- Hangul: 김일성종합대학
- Hanja: 金日成綜合大學
- RR: Gim Ilseong jonghap daehak
- MR: Kim Ilsŏng chonghap taehak
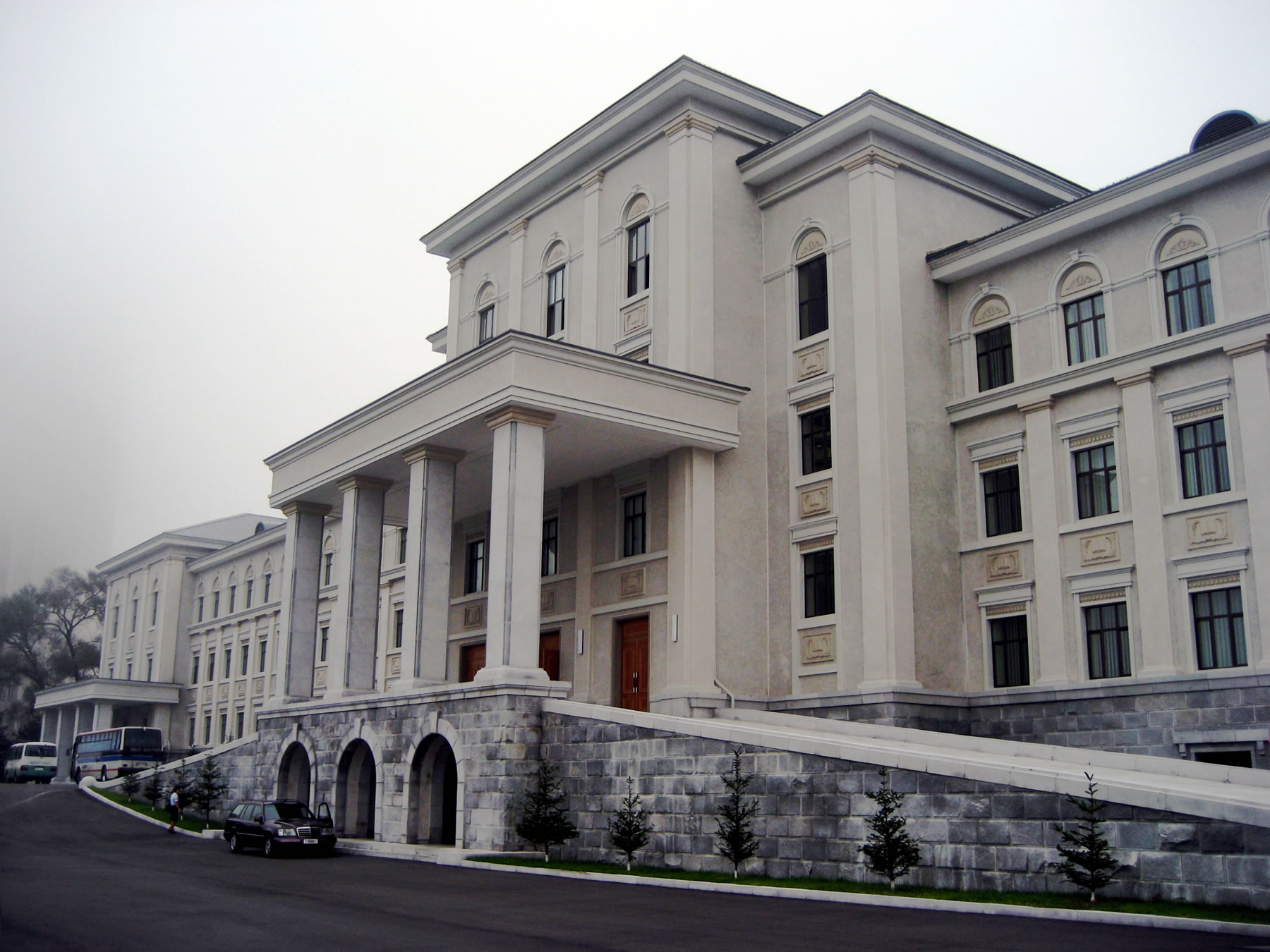

Kim Il Sung University (Korean: 김일성종합대학) is a public university in Taesong, Pyongyang, North Korea. It was founded on 1 October 1946 and was the first tertiary education institution established in post-war North Korea.

The 15-hectare (37-acre) campus, along with the main academic buildings, consists of 10 offices, 50 laboratories, libraries, museums, a printing press, an R&D center, dormitories, and a hospital. There is a large computer lab, but it has limited internet access. The university is named in honour of former North Korean leader Kim Il Sung.

The student body of Kim Il Sung University is approximately 16,000 students, and offers programs in law, economics, the humanities, and natural sciences. In the spring of 2017, specialised Japanese language and literature courses began being offered. Undergraduate degrees are typically four or five years. The university has a graduate school for doctoral students.

== History ==
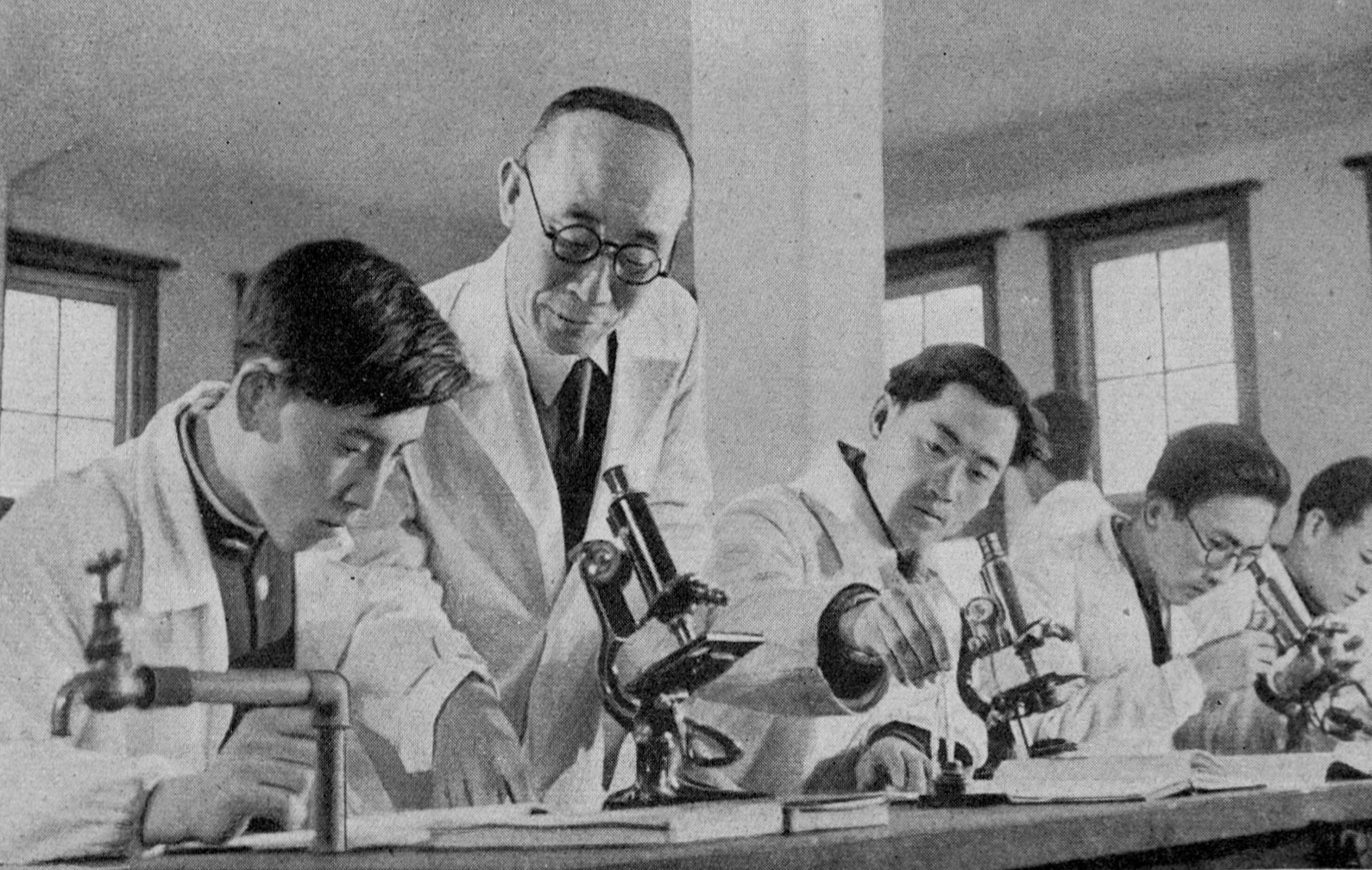
Medical students at the newly opened Kim Il Sung University in Nov. 1946.

On 25 May 1946, the Preparatory Committee was formed by the founding universities. In July 1946, the university was established by order of the interim People's Committee of North Korea (ordinance No. 40).

In 1948, four university faculties (Faculty of Engineering, Transportation Engineering, Faculty of Agriculture, Faculty of Medicine) were separated from Kim Il Sung University to form Pyongyang University of Technology (currently Kim Chaek University of Technology), Wonsan University of Agriculture, Pyongyang Medical University, and the Pyongyang University of Architecture.

During the Korean War, the university was located at Baeksong-ri under Mount Jamo in Suncheon-gun, which was far from the centre of the city. By late 1955, the reconstruction of the main building on the Pyongyang campus was in progress and soon the university moved back to the centre of Pyongyang.

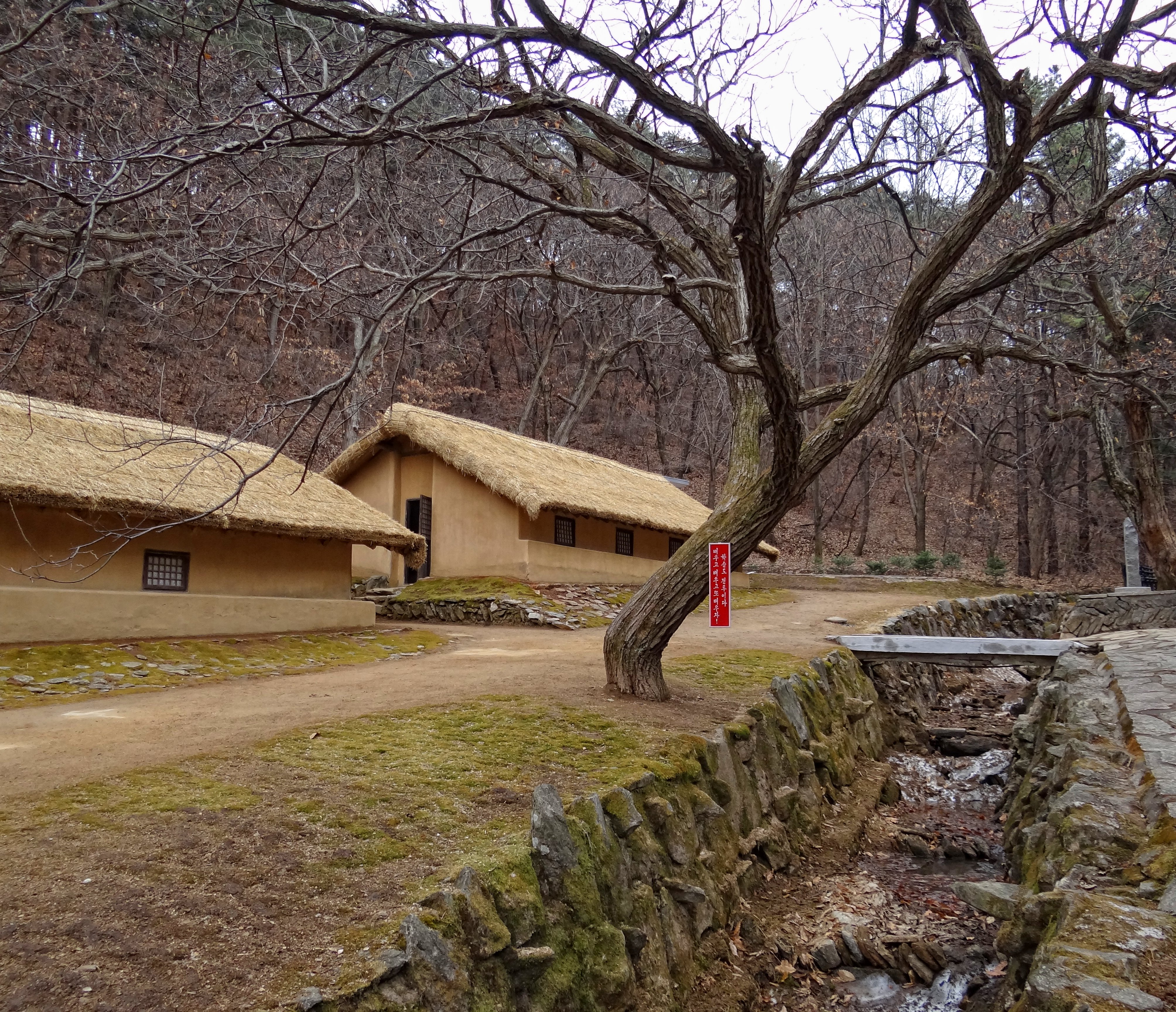
Buildings at the Paeksong Revolutionary Site near Pyongsong, to which many students from Kim Il Sung University were moved during the Korean War, for reasons of safety.

After the war, Kim Il Sung University became known as a hotbed of intellectual dissent. Academics supported more intellectual freedoms than Kim loyalists, and disadvantageous factions within the Workers' Party of Korea were over-represented in university staff. Following the Revolutions of 1956 in Hungary and in Poland, North Korean exchange students were quickly repatriated from the affected countries. The students started asking "improper" questions on campus, causing alarm. After that, up to one hundred students and several prominent staff members were purged. The purging of the university gave further impetus to purges against functionalists all over the country.

By the end of 1970s more than 50,000 students had graduated from the university. In addition, the university was an important asset for the Korean People's Army to train its personnel.

Beginning in the 1970s, some English-medium programs have been taught at the university.

Until 2004, Pak Kwan-o, an authority on nuclear physics and the Chairman of the Pyongyang City People's Committee (synonymous with mayor), had been serving as the president for 17 years. According to the university's website, the current president is Kim Sung Chan who was appointed in 2021.

In May 2010, Pyongyang Medical College, Sariwon Kye Ung Sang Agricultural College and Pyongyang Agricultural College became members of the Kim Il Sung University Council. Those three institutions were later removed in October 2019.

According to Korean Central Television, North Korean students can take classes at and download lectures from Kim Il Sung University via the Mirae WiFi network, beginning in 2018.

== International students ==
Kim Il Sung University first began admitting international students in 1995; as of 2019, approximately 5000 international students from 30 countries have studied at the university. Prior to the COVID-19 pandemic, there were estimated to be about 100 foreign students at Kim Il Sung University, the majority of whom were Chinese.

International students reside alongside specially selected North Korean students known as tongsuksaeng, who serve as cultural liaisons and language tutors. However, these hosts are also reported to monitor the foreign students' activities, including inspecting personal belongings and tracking movements.

Foreign students seeking to undertake postgraduate studies at Kim Il Sung University are required to provide their birth certificate, a letter of intent, their undergraduate qualification(s), a police background check from their home country, medical records, details of their financial background to show how they will be financing their education in North Korea, as well as a letter attesting to their Korean language ability.

== Achievements ==
In 2016, the university placed 30th in the International Collegiate Programming Contest (ICPC). As of June 2026, this is the first and only time they participated in the ICPC.

== Departments ==
=== Social sciences ===
- Finance
- Foreign languages and Literature
- Economics
- History
- Korean language and Literature
- Law
- Philosophy

=== Natural sciences ===
- Chemistry
- Electronics and Automation
- Energy Science
- Forest Science
- Geography
- Geo-environmental Science
- Geology
- Computer Science
- Life Science
- Materials Science
- Mathematics
- Mechanics
- Physics

=== Others ===
- Distance Education
- Education

== Notable alumni ==
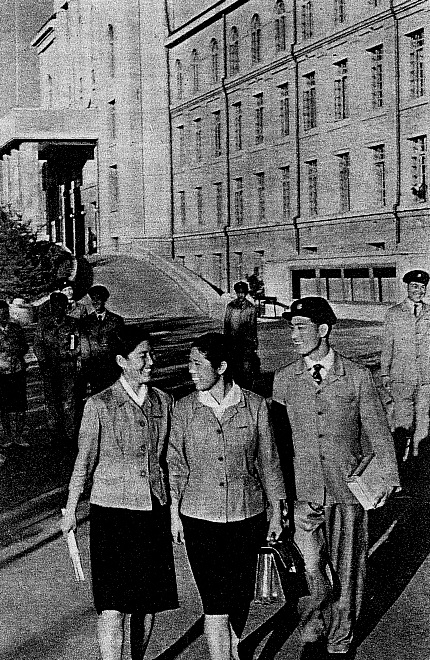
Kim Il Sung University, c. 1960

- An Kyong-ho, former Chief Director of the Committee for the Peaceful Reunification of the Fatherland
- Kim Jong Il, former Supreme Leader of North Korea, attended 1960–1964
- Kim Jong Un, Supreme Leader of North Korea since December 2011, may have attended 2002–2007.
- Kim Pyong Il, half-brother of Kim Jong Il and former ambassador to the Czech Republic
- Kim Yo Jong, sister of Kim Jong Un, said to have studied Computer Technology alongside Japanese abductee Megumi Yokota's daughter, Kim Eun-gyon.
- Kyong Won-ha, nuclear scientist
- Andrei Lankov, Kookmin University professor and former Australian National University lecturer, attended as an exchange student in 1985 from Leningrad State University, Institute of Oriental Studies.
- Rüdiger Frank, Professor for East Asian Economy and Society, attended as an exchange student in 1991/1992.
- Paek Nam-sun, former Minister of Foreign Affairs
- Sin Son-ho, previous Permanent Representative of North Korea to the United Nations
- Zhang Dejiang, former Chairman of the Standing Committee of the National People's Congress and former member of Politburo Standing Committee of the Chinese Communist Party.
- Ri Sol-ju, first lady of North Korea and wife of North Korean leader Kim Jong Un.
- Thae Jong-su, North Korean politician

== See also ==
- List of universities in North Korea
- Pyongyang University of Science and Technology
- Education in North Korea
