= Mass media in North Korea =

The mass media in North Korea is amongst the most strictly controlled in the world. The constitution nominally provides for freedom of speech and the press. However, the government routinely disregards these rights, and seeks to mold information at its source. A typical example of this was the death of Kim Jong Il, news of which was not divulged until two days after it occurred. Kim Jong Un, who replaced his father as the leader, has largely followed in the footsteps of both his grandfather, Kim Il Sung, and his father. However, new technologies are being made more freely available in the country. State-run media outlets are setting up websites, while mobile phone ownership in the country has escalated rapidly. "There is no country which monopolizes and controls successfully the internet and information as North Korea does," said Kang Shin-sam, an expert on North Korean technology and co-head of the International Solidarity for Freedom of Information in North Korea, a nonprofit based in South Korea. North Korea has about four million mobile-phone subscribers circa 2022—roughly one-sixth of the population and four times the number in 2012, according to an estimate by Kim Yon-ho, a senior researcher at Johns Hopkins University's School of Advanced International Studies.

Reporters Without Borders has consistently ranked North Korea at or near the bottom of its yearly Press Freedom Index since it was first issued in 2002. The latest report, published in 2024, puts North Korea at the 177th slot out of 180.

The state news agencies are the only outlets in North Korea.

== Press freedom ==
Article 67 of the North Korean Constitution protects freedom of speech and freedom of the press. In practice, however, the press is tightly controlled by the state, and the government only allows speech that supports it and the ruling Workers' Party of Korea..

The late Kim Jong Il's book, The Great Teacher of Journalists, advises that "newspapers carry articles in which they unfailingly hold the president in high esteem, adore him and praise him as the great revolutionary leader." Media reports in North Korea are often one-sided and exaggerated, playing "little or no role in gathering and disseminating vital information true to facts" and providing propaganda for the regime.

All North Korean journalists are members of the Workers' Party. Candidates for journalism school must not only prove themselves ideologically clean but also come from politically reliable families. Journalists who do not follow the strict laws face punishment in the form of hard labour or imprisonment, or sometimes even execution. Only news that favours the regime is permitted, whilst news that covers the economic and political problems in the country, or criticisms of the regime from abroad is not allowed. Domestic media and the population itself are not allowed to carry or read stories by foreign media and can be punished for doing so.

== Cult of personality ==
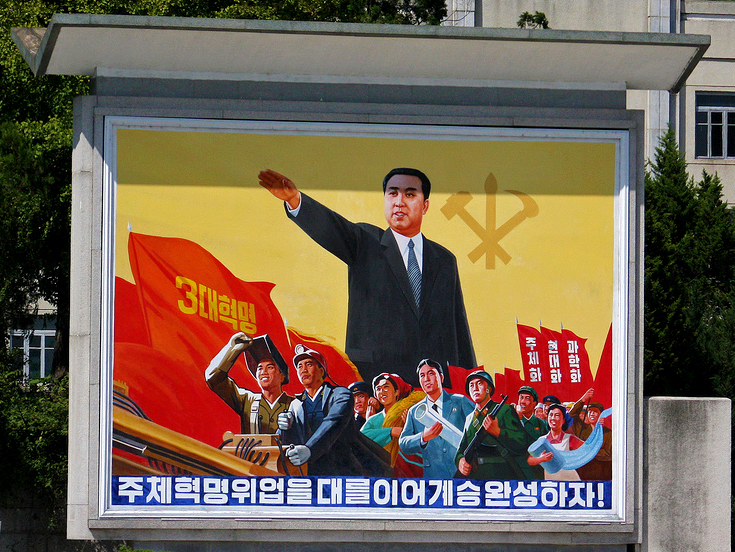
Media maintains a cult of personality for the Kim family, including Kim Il Sung.

The media have consistently upheld the personality cult of the Kim family since the country's formation. It frequently reported on the activities of late leader Kim Jong Il, regularly reporting on his daily activities, including "prayers" to founding leader Kim Il Sung. Previously, media would refer to Kim Jong Il as the "Dear Leader", though this was dropped in 2004. However, in January 1981, during the first few months of Kim Jong Il's entry into politics, a survey revealed economic concerns in the media, rather than upholding the cult—60% to 70% of media coverage was focused on the economy in January that year, and between January and September, 54% of editorials in the Rodong Sinmun also referred to economic problems, with only 20% on politics, 10% on reunification and 4% on foreign affairs. All indications are that this has continued under the country's third and current leader, Kim Jong-un; soon after his father's death he was acclaimed as the "Great Successor".

Approximately 90% of airtime on international news broadcasts in North Korea is propaganda spent describing the publication of works by Kim Jong Il and showing various study groups in foreign countries, to allegedly mislead the North Korean public as to the outside world's perceptions of the country. When Kim Jong Il visited Russia in August 2001, official DPRK media reported Russians as being "awestruck" by the encounter, revering Kim Jong Il's ability to "stop the rain and make the sun come out".

== Domestic and international coverage ==
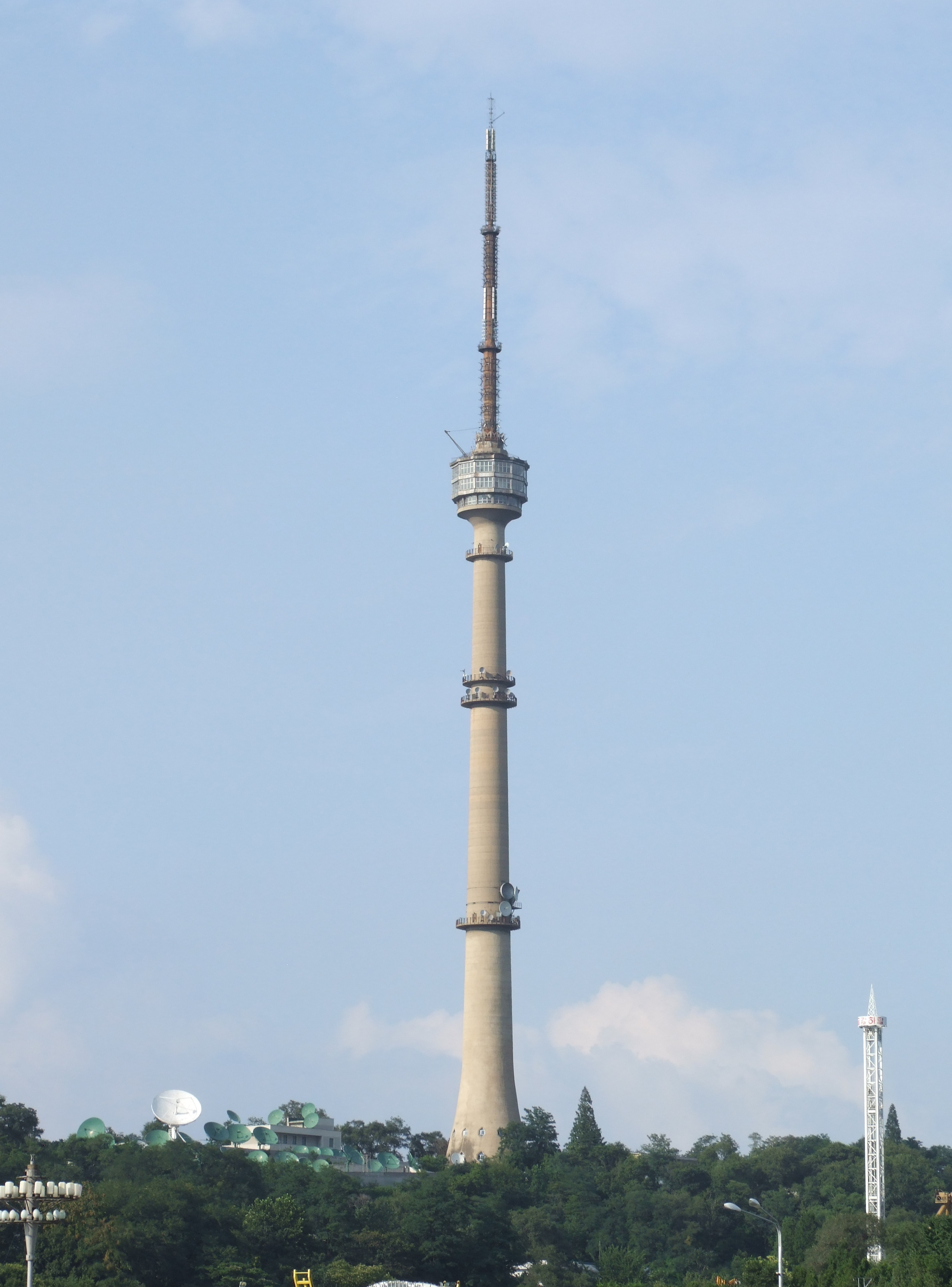
Pyongyang TV Tower

The media is used to promote contrasting domestic and international agendas. Kim Il Sung was said to recognise its power to influence North Koreans and confuse the outside world. Often, the news is released to the international community and withheld from the domestic North Korean population, and other news is released domestically but not internationally.

Though some international news coverage is given in DPRK media, much is ignored, is mentioned very briefly, or is announced several days after the event, as was the case with the Ryongchon disaster in 2004. Reports are also notoriously secretive. The media remained silent on domestic issues, by not reporting on economic reforms introduced by the government such as increasing wages and food prices, rarely mentioning Kim Jong Il until his first party position in 1980 and the launching of missiles. Restrictions on the dissemination of information do not only apply to the civilian population but North Korean officials themselves, depending on ranking.

In contrast, the idea of reunification of the two Koreas is a pervasive theme in the North Korean media, as is the near-constant "threat" of an "imminent attack" by the foreign countries. In recent years, the media describes in detail satellite launches launched by the country as a sign of the DPRK's "economic prowess." The media rarely reports bad news from the country; however on one rare occasion, the press acknowledged a famine and food shortages in the 1990s.

It has had a role in supporting anti-government demonstrations in South Korea; in the late 1980s, it launched a propaganda campaign urging South Koreans to "fight against the 'government' without concessions and compromise", using false claims to portray the demonstrations as fighting for communism, which, rather, were in support of liberal democracy. It continues to support South Korean anti-government groups, quoting relevant societies and unions critical of the government policy and denouncing government "crackdowns", calling for freedom of expression and democracy for South Korean citizens. From January 1 to June 22, 2009, North Korean media was reported to have criticised Lee Myung-bak, then-President of South Korea 1,700 times — an average of 9.9 times daily.

During the Khrushchev era of the Soviet Union when relations were tense, North Korean media would openly reprint articles critical of the USSR, often written by North Korean officials. However, once relations between the DPRK and the Soviet Union improved, the articles would no longer appear. In the following years, both North Korean and Soviet media would play down sensitive anniversaries.

== Newspapers ==
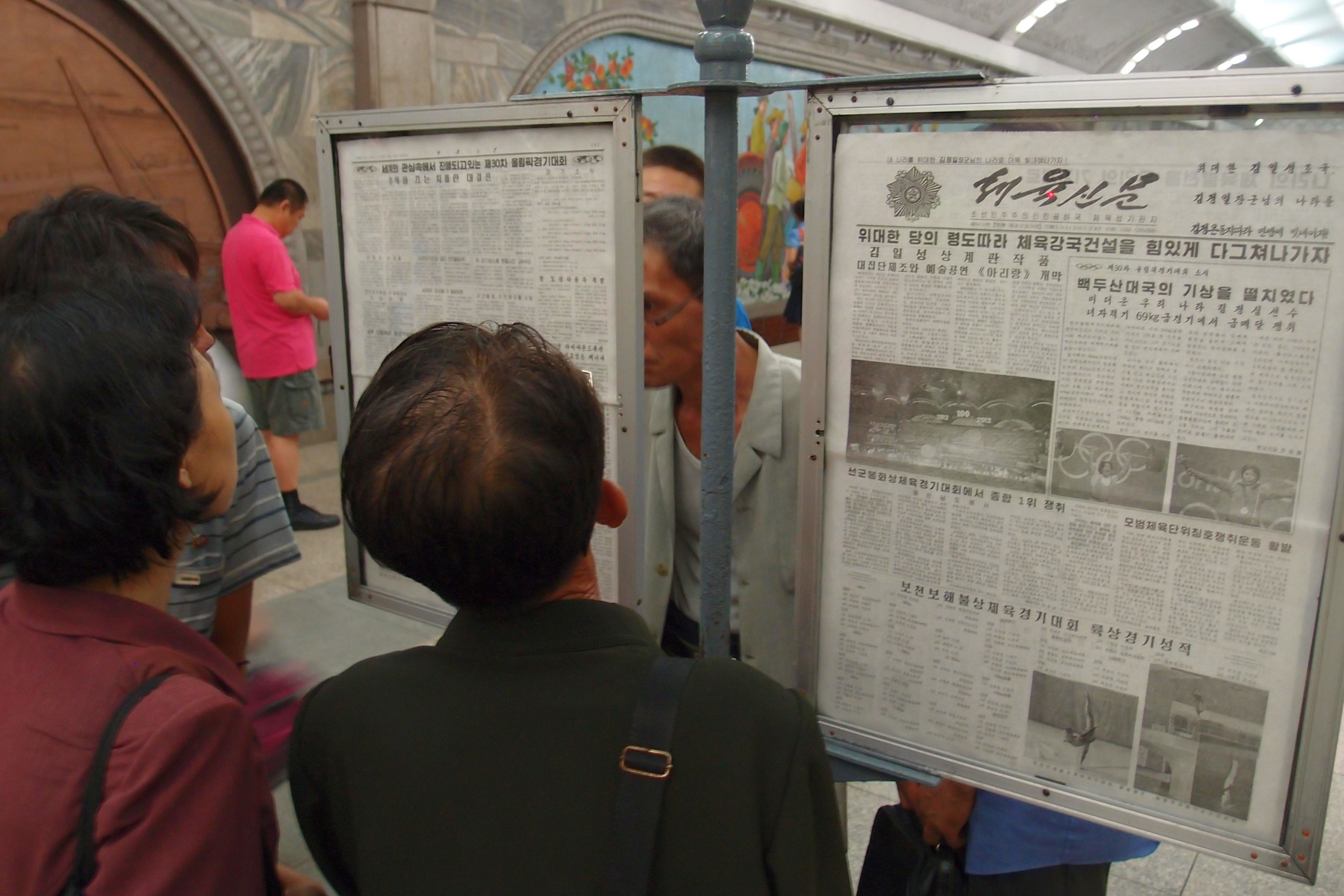
A public newspaper reading stand in the Pyongyang Metro

North Korea has 12 principal newspapers and 20 major periodicals, all published in Pyongyang. Foreign newspapers are not sold on the streets of the capital. Every year, North Korean press jointly publishes a New Year editorial, also broadcast by KCNA, which regularly attracts the attention of the international news media.

Newspapers include:

- Rodong Sinmun (Labour Daily) – (Central Committee of the WPK)
- Joson Inmingun (Korean People's Army Daily)
- Minju Choson (Democratic Korea) – government organ
- Rodongja Sinmun (Workers' Newspaper)
- The Pyongyang Times (English-language; published in the capital)

Several newspaper journalists from North Korea were secretly trained in China to covertly report on events inside North Korea. The newspapers include restricted circulation papers such as Chamgo Sinmun that is an international affairs newspaper published by the Central Committee Publications Department and distributed only to party officials. November 2007 marked the first publication of the Rimjingang magazine, which is distributed secretly in North Korea and neighbouring countries. The magazine covers the economic and political situation in the country. The journalists have also provided footage of public executions to South Korean and Japanese media.

== Photojournalism ==
Photojournalism is heavily regulated by the government. Due to the extremely limited flow of information out of the country, there is no consensus over what rules are actually in place to govern photojournalism by members of foreign press services. The government-owned Korean Central News Agency employs many photojournalists and photo editors.

North Korean leaders believe that their rules and censorship system is necessary in order to keep people under control, "to prevent the rise of criticism about the government."

== Television and radio ==
Television broadcasting is managed by the Central Broadcasting Committee of Korea (until 2009 called Radio and Television Committee of the DPRK). Radio and TV sets in North Korea are supplied pre-tuned to North Korean stations and must be checked and registered with the police, though some North Koreans own Chinese radios which can receive foreign stations. It is prohibited to tune into foreign broadcasts. There are four major television stations: Korean Central Television, Ryongnamsan Television (former Korean Educational and Cultural Network), Kaesong Television (which targets South Korea) and Sport Television (since August 15, 2015) State television is always off-air until its 5:00 pm evening news broadcast, except on weekends, which start at 6:00 am, and in emergency events, live events and national holidays. In August 2016, North Korea introduced an over-the-top streaming service known as Manbang (meaning "everywhere" or "every direction"), which carries live TV (including educational station Mansudae Television), on-demand video, and newspaper articles (from the state newspaper Rodong Sinmun) over the internet. KCTV described the service as a "respite from radio interference".

North Korean newscasts are known for their showmanship. KCTV's principal newsreader from 1974 to 2012, Ri Chun-hee, was well known for the wavering, exuberant tone she used when praising the nation's leaders and the hateful one she used in denouncing countries seen as hostile to the regime. Some North Korean journalists who have defected to the South have noted the contrasts with the more conversational South Korean broadcasting style.

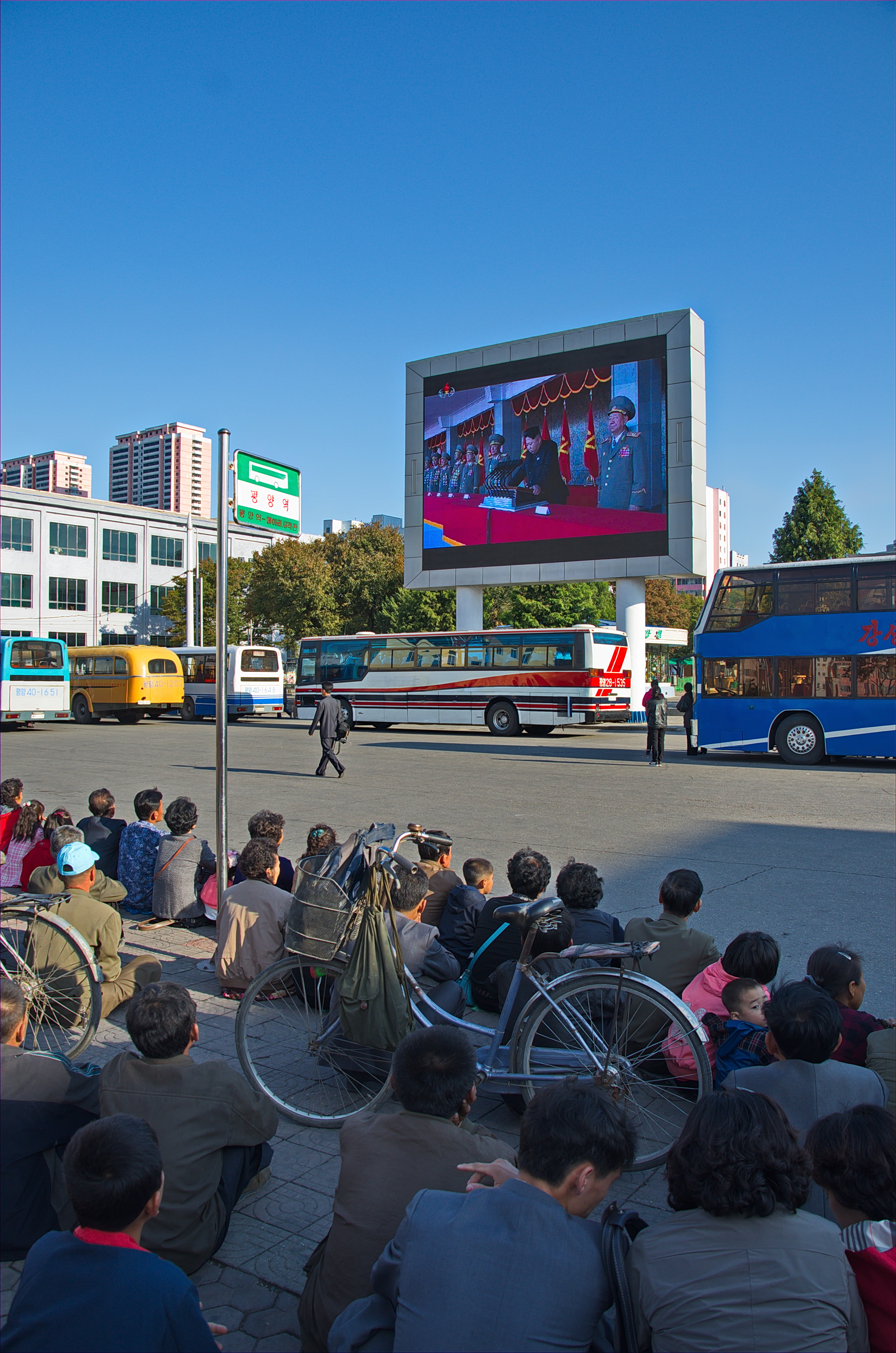
Open-air television in Pyongyang

All broadcast media in some way promotes the regime's ideologies and positions, such as Juche, and regularly condemns actions by South Korea, Japan, China, Israel, the United States, and other nations. The media in recent years condemns the United Nations, and its position against the country's nuclear program. Media is generally without adverts, though some advertisement of local brands occurs on Mansudae Television.

Due to the economic conditions in the country and the short broadcast day, radio is the most widely used medium. In 2006, there were 16 AM, 14 FM, and 11 shortwave radio broadcast stations. The main radio stations are the Pyongyang FM Station, Voice of Korea, and the Korean Central Broadcasting Station. There is also a black propaganda station called Propaganda Radio – which purports to be broadcasting from South Korea. Some foreign broadcast radio stations that target North Korea are often jammed, though this can vary. The authorities designate such foreign media as "enemies of the regime".

Some particularly politically sensitive material is available only through wired radio connections. The system was likely built with infrastructure imported from the Soviet Union, which operated a similar system known as radiotochka ("radio socket" in English). The cable radio transmissions are known by North Koreans as the "Third Broadcast" or the 'Third Network. It was reported that the third network was complete in 1982. After Kim Jong Un's stated the intention of improving 'wire broadcasting', the third network has seen installation in new apartment units, although in the 90s, distribution cables were apparently plundered for scrap metal. Similar to the Soviet wired radio system the radio sets are technologically simple affairs with few electronic components inside them besides a loudspeaker and a control coil for the volume, they have no "off" switch, but can be unplugged.

South Korean television programmes cannot be received in North Korea due to incompatibilities between the television systems (PAL in North Korea and NTSC/ATSC in South Korea) and the sets being pre-tuned. South Korean soap operas, films and Western Hollywood films according to defectors, are said to be spreading at a "rapid rate" throughout North Korea despite the threat of punishment; As of 2011, USB flash drives were selling well in North Korea, primarily used for watching South Korean dramas and films on personal computers.

North Korean broadcasts have been picked up in South Korea, and are monitored by the Unification Ministry in Seoul, which handles cross-border relations and media exchanges.

Defectors are also streaming North Korean television broadcasts on the Internet.

== Internet ==
Internet access in North Korea is restricted to Internet cafés or hotels designated for foreign tourists in Pyongyang, and is limited for North Koreans to essential users like international businesses. Nearly all of North Korea's Internet traffic is routed through China. The general population of North Korea does not have internet access, however, they do have access to Kwangmyong, an intranet set up by the government. North Korea itself has a limited presence on the internet, with several sites on their national .kp domain. The Mosquito Net filtering model used in North Korea attempts to attract foreign investment, while the filter simultaneously blocks foreign ideas.

== Video games ==
Accessibility to video games increased over the late 2000s and 2010s as mobile phones began to enter the North Korean market, with simple domestically produced mobile games becoming more common. Web games developed by North Korean companies have also been developed throughout the 2010s, often with a focus on education.

In September 2019 state-run media announced the release of a motion-based video game system named the Moranbong. The system appears to exhibit similar features to the Nintendo Wii and PlayStation Move. The system has two wands similar in appearance to Wii controllers, a motion detector similar in appearance to the Kinect, and a sensor-based mat that detects foot-based input. The system is effectively a rebranded version of the Subor G80, a Chinese console running Android OS.

== Access to foreign media ==
Despite extremely strict regulations and draconian penalties, North Koreans, particularly elite citizens, have increasing access to news and other media outside the state-controlled media authorized by the government. While access to the internet is tightly controlled, radio, DVDs, and USB drives are common media accessed, and in border areas, television. Penalties vary depending on the source of the media; being found with South Korean media may be punished more harshly than access to Chinese media. One estimate is that approx. 92% of North Koreans access foreign media at least once a month.

== See also ==
- Censorship in North Korea
- Propaganda in North Korea
- Telecommunications in North Korea
- Radio jamming in Korea
- Media of South Korea
- Media coverage of North Korea

== Bibliography ==
- Chong, Bong-uk. (1995). North Korea, the land that never changes: before and after Kim Il-sung. Naewoe Press.
- Clippinger, Morgan E. (1981). "Kim Chong-il in the North Korean Mass Media: A Study of Semi-Esoteric Communication." Asian Survey. 21(3), 289—309.
- Djankov, Simeon; McLeish, Caralee; Nenova, Tatiana & Shleifer, Andrei. (2003). "Who owns the media?" Journal of Law and Economics. 46, pp. 341–381.
- Ford, G.; Kwon, S. (2008). North Korea on the brink: struggle for survival. Pluto Press. ISBN 978-0-7453-2598-9.
- Goodkind, Daniel; West, Loraine. (2001). "The North Korean Famine and Its Demographic Impact." Population and Development Review. 27(2), 219—238.
- Hassig, Kongdan Oh; Bermudez Jr, Joseph S.; Gause, Kenneth E.; Hassig, Ralph C.; Mansorov, Alexandre Y.; Smith, David J. (2004). "North Korean Policy Elites." Institute for Defense Analysis..
- Hodge, Homer T. (2003). "North Korea's Military Strategy." Parameters. 33.
- Kim, Mike. (2008). Escaping North Korea: Defiance and Hope in the World's Most Repressive Country. Rowman & Littlefield. ISBN 978-0-7425-5620-1.
- Kim, Samuel S. (2006). The two Koreas and the great powers. Cambridge University Press. ISBN 978-0-521-66063-1.
- Kun, Joseph H. (1967). "North Korea: Between Moscow and Peking." The China Quarterly. 31, 48—58.
- Hunter, Helen-Louise. (1999). Kim Il-song's North Korea. Greenwood Publishing Group. ISBN 978-0-275-96296-8.
- Marshall Cavendish Corporation; Macdonald, Fiona; Stacey, Gillian; Steele, Phillip. (2004). Peoples of Eastern Asia. Marshall Cavendish. ISBN 978-0-7614-7553-8.
- Oh, Kang Dong & Hassig, Ralph C. (2000). North Korea through the looking glass. Brookings Institution Press. ISBN 978-0-8157-6435-9.
- Pervis, Larinda B. (2007). North Korea Issues: Nuclear Posturing, Saber Rattling, and International Mischief. Nova Science Publishers. ISBN 978-1-60021-655-8.
- Pinkston, Daniel A. (2003). "Domestic politics and stakeholders in the North Korean missile development program." The Nonproliferation Review. 10(2), 51—65.
- Quick, Amanda, C. (2003). World Press Encyclopedia: N-Z, index. Gale. ISBN 978-0-7876-5584-6.
- Savada, Andrea Matles. (1994). North Korea: A Country Study. Washington, D.C.: Federal Research Division Library of Congress. ISBN 0-8444-0794-1.
- Shin, Rin-Sup. (1982). "North Korea in 1981: First Year for De Facto Successor Kim Jong Il." Asian Survey. 22(1), 99—106.
- Zagoria, Donald S. (1977). "Korea's Future: Moscow's Perspective." Asian Survey. 17(11), 1103—1112.
- Zhebbin, Alexander. (1995). "Russia and North Korea: An Emerging, Uneasy Partnership." Asian Survey. 35(8), 726—739.
