= Manbang =

North Korean digital media player

Manbang 만방

- Home Screen of Manbang 2.0.5
- Developer: Korean Central Broadcasting Committee
- Type: Digital media player
- Operating system: Android 4.4.2 (heavily modified to include security functions to monitor usage and prevent unauthorised apps from being installed and used)
- Connectivity: RCA cable and HDMI

- Manbang
- Hangul: 만방
- RR: Manbang
- MR: Manbang

Manbang (Korean: 만방) is a series of state-owned digital media players issued by North Korea's Korean Central Broadcasting Committee, providing over-the-top content in the form of channels.

== History ==
The exact release date of Manbang system is unclear.

One of the first set-top box appears to be manufactured in 2015. An intranet site listing in 2015 included a site named "Manbang", with the operator being the Korean Central Television.

On 16 August 2016, Manbang appeared for the first time on a report "망 TV다매체열람기'만방'" by the Korean Central Television. It has been reported that the implementation of the "Intranet" Protocol Television (IPTV), which runs on North Korea's Kwangmyong intranet, has begun.

It also showcased a set-top box, which was developed by the Manbang IT company, on which Manbang is based. KCTV also stated that the new service already has "several hundred users", and is "making the lives of citizens and children flourish".

In 2017, additional TV stations were added with a wider selection of movies, sports, and documentaries.

The state-owned company Myohyang IT announced the Ryonghung iPad, which can support an app for Manbang.

In November 2019, during the Exhibition of IT Successes, the Manbang IT company showcased a version of Manbang working on a tablet PC.

== System ==
Due to North Korea's isolationism, users connect to the service not by the internet, but via the state-controlled intranet using the IPTV protocol. It is hard to tell if the technology at play is IPTV or VOD, but according to the description it is a mixture of both.

The device is an Internet Protocol Television that works through a separate box.

The system comes as a set-top box, which first has to be connected to a modem, and after that to a phone line. The box can be connected to a television through an HDMI cable.

== Usage ==
Manbang was created in response to streaming platforms like Netflix and Roku in the west, and the popularity of Chinese-made Notel players in North Korea.

Manbang, which translates to "everywhere", was originally available to citizens in Pyongyang, Sinuiju and Sariwon, but coverage has since expanded to the other parts of the country.

=== Availability ===
Since 2016, it appeared that the North Korean government is working towards making the service widely accessible. Reports stated that the demand is rising in Sinuiju with hundreds of people using the service.

In 2020, it was reported that the North Korean authorities were pressuring overseas North Korean residents in China to purchase IPTV set-top box as to monitor users activities and strengthen ideological education.

In 2023, it was revealed that in order to pay in Manbang, people need to have their electronic certificate and copy certificate connected to a storage device, and connect it to the app in order to run Ullim in Manbang.

== Content ==
In addition to video on demand, Manbang is reported to offer live streams of at least 5 channels:

#	Channel	Korean name
1	Korean Central Television	조선중앙텔레비죤
2	Mansudae Television	만수대텔레비죤
3	Ryongnamsan Television	룡남산텔레비죤
4	Athletic Television	체육텔레비죤
5	Korean Central Broadcasting Station	중앙방송

Users may also find political information regarding the Supreme Leader and the Juche ideology. Users are also able to read news articles from the Rodong Sinmun, as well as the Korean Central News Agency (KCNA).

Users can access an entire week's state television broadcasts, as well as older programs and propaganda films.

It appears to be useful for students, as academic materials from various institutions as well as textbooks for primary and middle school can be browsed. It also claims to allow viewers to learn English and Russian languages.

Worker education services for North Korean enterprises are also available via the Manbang service. On 20 January 2019, a report showed workers at the "Rangrim Forest Management Office" (랑림림산사업소) receiving science and technology lessons.

The government could spread its propaganda deeper into the country via Manbang, and get greater insight into the habits of the nation.

=== Expansion ===
Since Manbang's launch, the increased coverage of television broadcasts reduced the need or interest for the system among North Koreans.

As a response, an expansion of the system was announced. It was first showcased in the "Development of Light Industry 2025 exhibition" in Pyongyang, showing its new features such as 20 programming options, 24 hour service, and access via smart TV, set-top box and smartphone. This service has been compared to a cable television network.

Although the price of the service is unknown, it has been described as a "huge expansion in entertainment options" for North Koreans, offering a varied selection of content such as movies, music, educational content, cartoons, foreign films, cooking shows and nature documentaries.

Voice of Korea radio programs are also available via the system.

== Sales ==
As of 2020, according to Asia Press (Rimjingang), the price of a set-top box bought with monthly installments is 6,000 North Korean won ($7) per year. A box can be purchased outright for around 22,000 North Korean won ($24).

The boxes can also be leased on a subscription.

The North Korean embassy in China is selling the set-top boxes at a price of RMB 2,000 [USD 282] per box. These set-top boxes appear to be connected to the Internet.

== Culture reference ==
On 25 August 2016, Netflix took a light-hearted jab at Manbang by changing its Twitter bio description to read:

"Manbang knock-off."

== See also ==
- Samjiyon tablet computer
- Arirang (smartphone)
- Notel
- Internet in North Korea
- Telecommunications in North Korea
