= Television in North Korea =

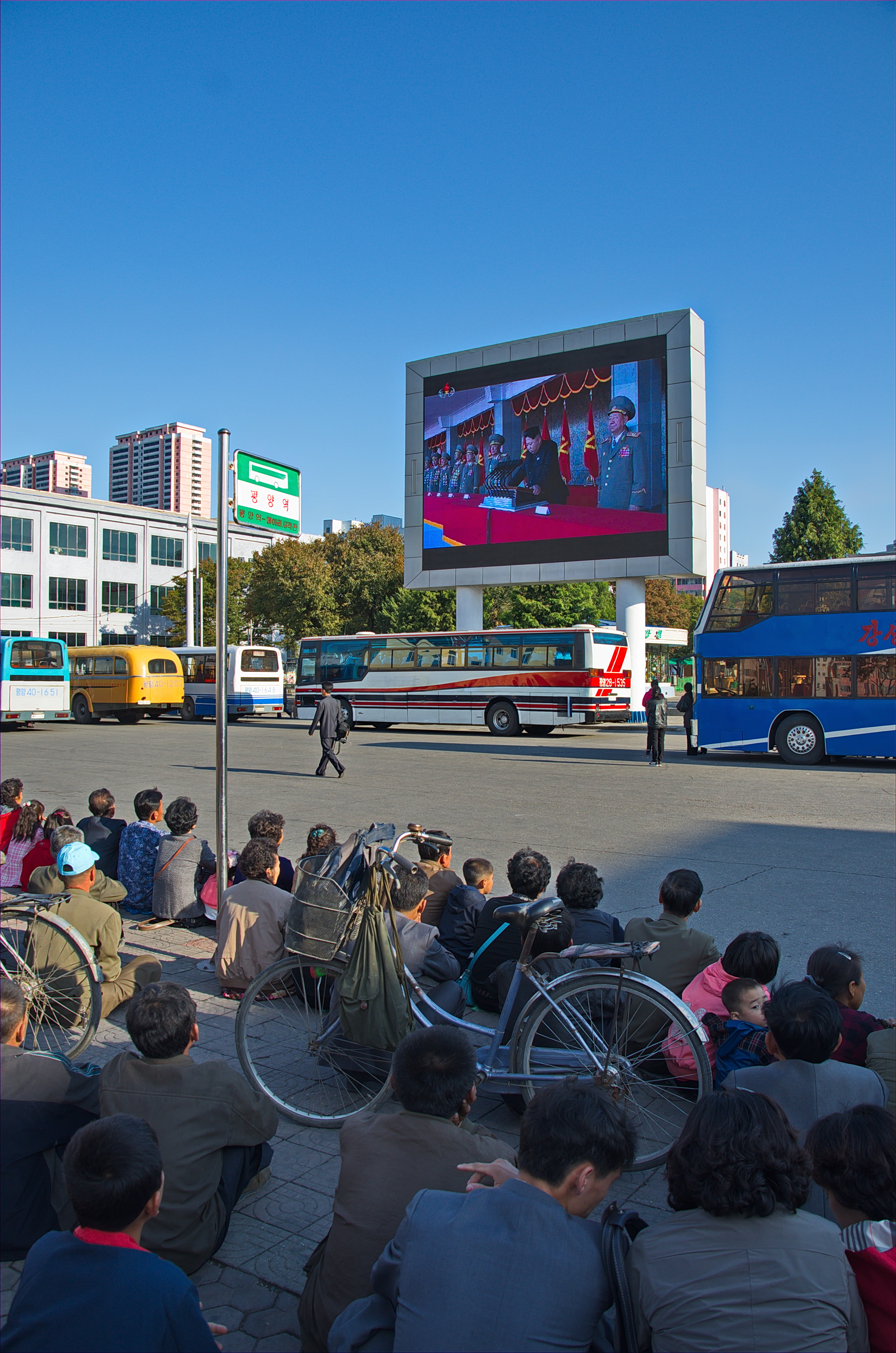
Open air display of Korean Central Television in Pyongyang, 2015

Television in North Korea (officially the Democratic People's Republic of Korea) is subject to the Korean Central Broadcasting Committee and controlled by the Propaganda and Agitation Department of the Workers' Party of Korea, which control all television channels broadcast in North Korea. A study in 2017 found that 98% of households had a television set. As of 2026, there are over-the-air broadcasts in both analogue and recently launched digital formats. Television officially started in North Korea with the launch of Korean Central Television on 3 March 1963, which remains the primary channel. North Korea currently uses the PAL system for analog broadcasts and DVB for digital, which makes receiving (particularly) South Korean and Chinese television signals difficult for most North Koreans.

== Technological data ==
Television in North Korea uses the PAL 576i Systems D and K analog signal transmission system and 4:3 aspect ratio. Before 1993, North Korea was operating on the SECAM television system, which also uses 576i at 4:3. The four major television channels — Korean Central Television, Mansudae, Athletic Television and Ryongnamsan — broadcast over the air, as well as on a cable television system in Pyongyang; these channels are also available in a special app found on the government issued Samjiyon tablet computers, as well as on the Manbang IPTV service.

North Korea uses DVB-T2 for Digital Terrestrial Television. Trials began in 2012. As of 2020, multiple set-top box models were available, giving access to the four broadcast channels. As of 2025, only Mansudae still broadcasts in standard definition; the other channels broadcast in high definition.

Television sets sold in North Korea are able to operate only on the PAL and DVB-T2 systems, to prevent them from being able to pick up broadcasts from South Korea (which use NTSC System M analogue and ATSC digital) or China (which uses DTMB digital). However, broadcasts from Russia can be picked up, as they are also DVB-T2. Imported TV sets that are able to operate on both PAL and NTSC, such as those from Japan, have their NTSC abilities disabled by the government on import.

== Television channels ==
As of 18 September 2026, there are four television channels in North Korea. All are state-owned and are usually on air from daytime to prime time.

=== Korean Central Television ===
External videos
- Korean Central Television
- "Development of Television under Kim Jong Il"; excerpt from North Korean television on the development of KCTV in the 1980s and 1990s

This is the oldest and main television channel in North Korea, and it started regular broadcasting in 1963. As of 2017, it is the only North Korean TV channel broadcasting to the outside world via satellite television and IPTV aside from domestic transmissions. On satellite, KCTV is available in standard definition as well as in Full HD. Since 4 December 2017, a test air broadcast in the format 16:9 SDTV was started.

=== Mansudae Television ===
Mansudae Television

Mansudae Television broadcasts cultural programming, foreign films (dubbed into Korean), European football, international news and educational material with the occasional advert to Pyongyang. It opened on 1 December 1973. The Mansudae TV Broadcasting Station broadcasts three hours (19:00–22:00) on Fridays and Saturdays, and nine hours (10:00–13:00, 16:00–22:00) on Sundays.

=== Ryongnamsan Television ===
External media
- Ryongnamsan Television

Images
- Screenshot of 16:9 testcard

Video
- Video recording of Ryongnamsan TV testcard with background music

Ryongnamsan Television (룡남산텔레비죤) is an educational channel provided by University Student TV Department of Korea Radio and Television. The de facto director of this channel is Yang Chun Won.

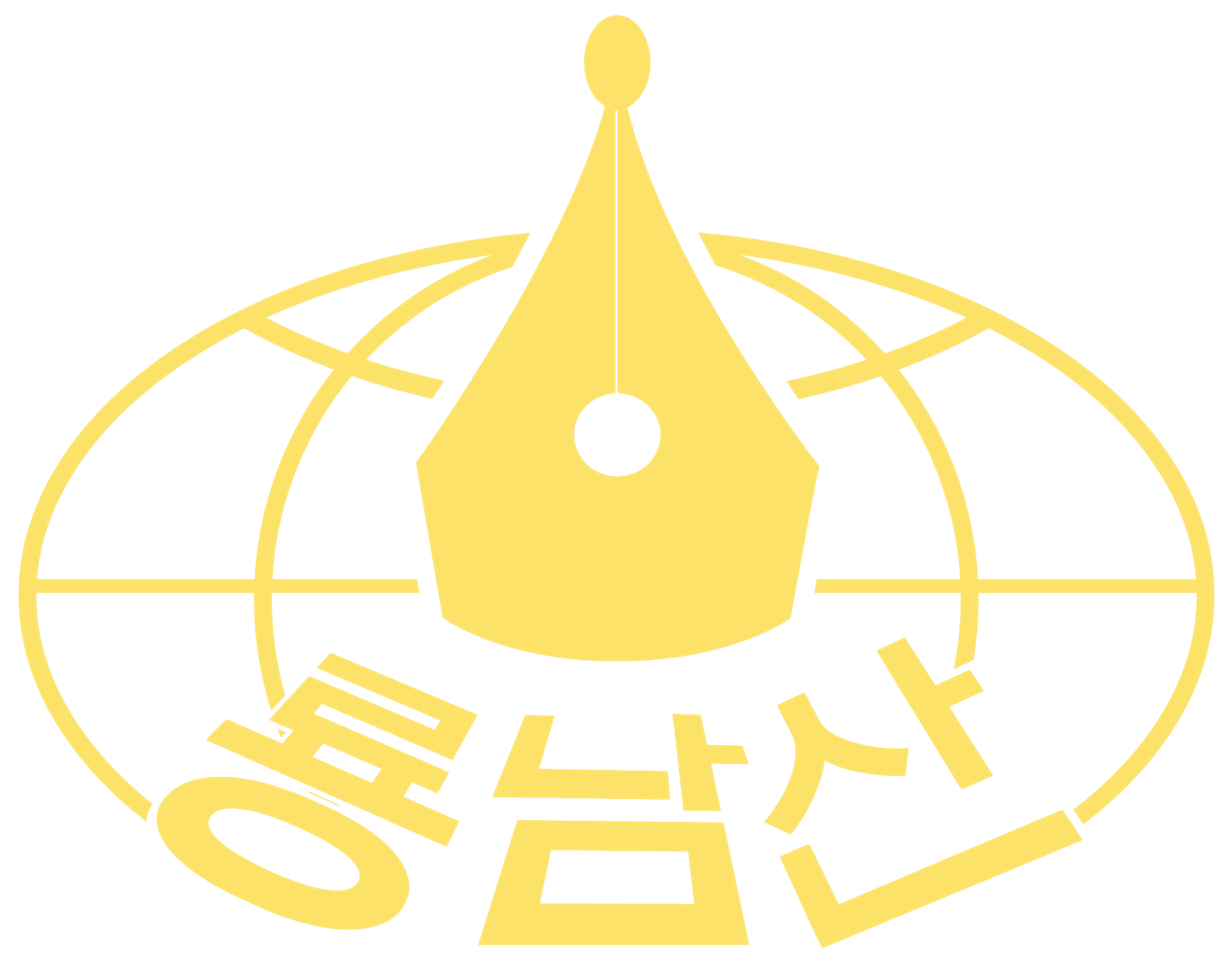
Logo of Ryongnansam Television

The channel started broadcasting on 1 April 1971, under the name "Kaesong". On 10 October 1991, that channel transitioned to color broadcasting. On 1 February 1997 (some sources say 16 February 1997), the channel was rebranded as the "Korean Educational and Cultural Network". According to the North Korea Handbook, the rebranding was connected with the 55th anniversary of Kim Jong Il. The channel was broadcast on Channel 9 in Pyongyang from 18:00 to 22:00 on weekdays. Also in the 1990s, the television station carried out experimental broadcasting from the television tower in Kaesong on Channel 8 in the NTSC-M format, as a way to promote North Korean culture among South Korean viewers. Channel 8 was chosen to prevent the signal from being jammed by South Korean broadcasters, since in Seoul, Channels 7 and 9 were used for KBS2 and KBS1 until that country's analogue shutdown on 31 December 2012. KBS1 and KBS2 were also broadcast in the demilitarized zone on Channels 29 and 28, respectively, although their signal was jammed by the North Korean government.

On 5 September 2012, the channel received its current name. Its schedule includes science documentaries in English, television lectures and educational programs for learning foreign languages. The channel is available for viewing to students of all universities of Pyongyang. The station broadcasts on Channel 9 from the Pyongyang TV tower, on the Manbang IPTV service, and on apps on Samjiyon tablets. It is available weekdays from 18:00 to 22:00.

=== Athletic Television ===
Cheyug TV

External image
- The DPRK Sport Television
- The Sport Television testcards (4:3 on center and fragment of 16:9 on the right)

Athletic Television (Cheyug TV, 체육텔레비죤), also called Sport TV, is the sports channel launched on 15 August 2015. Athletic Television presents sports competitions, primarily domestic, and documentaries and programs about the history of sports in North Korea and the world. The channel broadcasts on Saturdays and Sundays from 18:00 to 22:00.

== Pyongyang TV Tower ==
Frequency plan of Pyongyang TV Tower (2015) and the Manbang IPTV channels (2016). The VHF channels utilize System D and the UHF frequencies are System K.

Frequency channel	Manbang IPTV system	TV channel	Transmitter power (kW)
5 (93.25 MHz)	2	Mansudae Television	350
6 (175.25 MHz)	4	Athletic Television	250
9 (199.25 MHz)	3	Ryongnamsan Television	140
12 (223.25 MHz)	1	Korean Central Television	700
25 (503.25 MHz)	-	(planned)	
31 (551.25 MHz)	-	(planned)	

== Content ==
The programming content has changed over the years. International news is broadcast and documentaries are aired often and are usually on the topic of health, Korean and world history and geography. Since 2012, weather forecasting has become more accurate.

== See also ==
- List of North Korean television series
- Telecommunications in North Korea
- Media of North Korea
- Television in South Korea
