= Ishimaru =

Ishimaru (written: 石丸 lit. "stone circle") is a Japanese surname. Notable people with the surname include:

- Akira Ishimaru (アキラ 石丸; 1928–2025), Japanese-American electrical engineer and academic
- Hajime Ishimaru (1890–1990), Japanese painter
- Hiroya Ishimaru (石丸 博也; born 1941), Japanese voice actor
- Jiro Ishimaru (石丸 次郎; born 1962), Japanese journalist
- Kanji Ishimaru (石丸 幹二; born 1965), Japanese actor and singer
- Kazunari Ishimaru, Japanese engineer
- Kenjirō Ishimaru (石丸 謙二郎; born 1953), Japanese actor
- Kiyotaka Ishimaru (石丸 清隆; born 1973), Japanese footballer
- Toshihito Ishimaru (石丸 利人; 1931–2000), Japanese boxer

== Fictional characters ==
- Kiyotaka Ishimaru (石丸 清多夏), a character in the visual novel Danganronpa: Trigger Happy Havoc
