= List of countries by number of television broadcast stations =

This is a list of countries by number of television broadcast stations.

== List ==
Rank	Country/region	Number of television broadcast stations	Note	Date of information
1	Russia	6,700		2017
2	China	4,900	of which 209 are operated by China Central Television, 31 are provincial TV stations, and nearly 4,000 are local city stations	2017
-	European Union	7,581	sum of individual country television broadcast stations excluding repeaters.	2017
3	United States	2,761		2017
4	India	868		2018
5	United Kingdom	1,822	plus 7,902 repeaters	2011
6	Ukraine	647		2006
7	Turkey	635	plus 2,934 repeaters	1995
8	France	584	plus 9,676 repeaters	1995
9	Romania	575	plus 5,169 repeaters	2008
10	South Africa	556	plus 144 network repeaters	1997
11	Mongolia	456	including provincial and low-power repeaters	2006
12	Brazil	384		2009
13	Germany	489 EE	plus 8,042 repeaters	2020
14	Italy	458	plus 4,728 repeaters	1995
15	Philippines	350	plus 1,501 CATV networks	2007
16	Mexico	236	plus repeaters	1997
17	Spain	1,780	plus 2,105 repeaters; includes 24 television broadcast stations and 128 repeaters in the Canary Islands	2011
18	Japan	291	plus 7,341 repeaters; in addition, US Forces are served by 3 TV stations and 2 TV cable services	1999
19	Sweden	252		2008
20	Denmark	172		2008
21	Czech Republic	150	plus 1,434 repeaters	2000
22	Canada	278	plus many repeaters	2007
23	Finland	140	plus 431 repeaters; on 1 September 2007, Finland became one of the first countries in the world to broadcast all television signals digitally	1999
24	Pakistan	127	7 state-run channels and 110 privately owned satellite channels	2008
25	Saudi Arabia	117		1997
26	Bangladesh	115		2013
27	Switzerland	115	plus 1,919 repeaters	1995
28	Thailand	137		2006
29	Peru	105	plus 493 repeaters	1999
30	Australia	253		1997
31	Egypt	98		1995
32	Malaysia	262	mainland Malaysia 168, Sabah 21, and Sarawak 73	2006
33	Slovakia	130	national broadcasting 21, regional 10, local 67	2004
34	Serbia	400	5 national and 73 other (37 local) TV stations	2017
35	Taiwan	86	56 digital and 30 analog	2007
36	Vietnam	145	includes 63 relay, provincial, city TV, and district stations (Da Lat, Bao Loc, Phu Quoc, Con Dao, Do Luong)	2022
37	Afghanistan	85	15 national	2010
38	Norway	144	plus 2,729 repeaters	2008
39	Iran	78	Consisting of 29 national, 12 international; 35 provincial and 2 Internet TV stations (plus 450 repeaters) (IRIB plans to launch more networks soon)	2014
40	Venezuela	66	plus 45 repeaters	1997
41	Albania	144	3 national, 56 local; 83 cable networks	2005
42	Chile	63	plus 121 repeaters	1997
43	Uruguay	62		2005
44	Portugal	62	plus 166 repeaters; includes Azores and Madeira Islands	1995
45	Colombia	60		1997
46	Cuba	58		1997
47	Korea, South	87	plus 103 cable operators and 119 relay cable operators	2008
48	Hong Kong	55	2 TV networks, each broadcasting on 2 channels	2007
49	Indonesia	146	92 local TV stations; 54 national TV networks; each with its group of local transmitters	2018
50	North Macedonia	52		2007
51	Nepal	50	plus 9 repeaters	2015
52	Armenia	48		2020
52	Bolivia	48		1997
53	Belarus	96	plus 27 repeaters	2022
54	Algeria	46	plus 216 repeaters	1995
55	Syria	44	plus 17 repeaters	1995
56	Latvia	44	plus 31 repeaters	1995
57	Argentina	92	plus 444 repeaters	1997
58	New Zealand	41	plus about 700 repeaters	1997
59	Poland	200		2015
60	Moldova	40		2006
61	Bulgaria	86	plus 1,242 repeaters	2001
62	Panama	38	including repeaters	1998
63	Greece	150	plus 1,341 repeaters; also 2 stations in the US Armed Forces Radio and Television Service	1995
64	Croatia	205	plus 321 repeaters	2012
65	Morocco	35	plus 66 repeaters	1995
66	Hungary	390	plus 161 repeaters	1995
67	Bosnia and Herzegovina	152	Terrestrial: 46 channels; Cable: 106 channels	2016
68	Puerto Rico	32		2006
69	Slovenia	73		2006
70	Palestine	31		2008
71	Uzbekistan	28	includes 1 cable rebroadcaster in Tashkent and approximately 20 stations in regional capitals	2006
72	Lithuania	61	may have as many as 100 transmitters, including repeater stations	2001
73	Tunisia	26	plus 76 repeaters	1995
74	Guatemala	26	plus 27 repeaters	1997
75	Dominican Republic	25		2003
76	Belgium	89	plus 10 repeaters	1997
77	Jordan	22		2007
78	Netherlands	394	plus 26 repeaters	1995
79	Iraq	21		2004
80	Costa Rica	20	plus 43 repeaters	2002
81	Azerbaijan	47		2021
82	Israel	17	plus 36 repeaters	1995
83	Zimbabwe	1		2019
84	United Arab Emirates	35		2004
85	Lebanon	15	plus 5 repeaters	1995
86	Sri Lanka	34		2006
87	Iceland	51	plus 156 repeaters	1997
88	Côte d'Ivoire	14		1998
89	Oman	13	plus 25 repeaters	1999
90	Montenegro	17		2004
91	Kuwait	13	plus several satellite channels	1997
92	Swaziland	12	includes 7 relay stations	2004
93	Libya	12	plus 1 repeater	1999
94	Kazakhstan	32	plus 9 repeaters	1998
95	Georgia	98	plus repeaters	2007
96	Honduras	11	plus 17 repeaters	1997
97	Cyprus	30	area under government control: 8; area administered by Turkish Cypriots: 2, plus 4 relay	2004
98	Estonia	56		2001
99	Austria	54	plus more than 1,000 repeaters	2001
100	Zambia	9		2001
101	Cambodia	9	including 2 TV relay stations with French and Vietnamese broadcasts; excludes 18 regional relay stations	2006
102	Uganda	8	plus 1 repeater	2001
103	Kyrgyzstan	8	2 countrywide and 6 regional stations, state-owned; there are about 20 private TV stations, most of which rebroadcast other channels	2007
104	Kenya	75 FTA		2018
105	Laos	7	includes 1 station relaying Vietnam Television from Hanoi	2006
106	Jamaica	7		1997
107	Ghana	7		2007
108	French Polynesia	7	plus 17 repeaters	1997
109	Ecuador	68	plus 14 repeaters	2000
110	Trinidad and Tobago	6		2005
111	Tajikistan	6		2006
112	New Caledonia	6	plus 25 repeaters	1997
113	Guinea	6		2001
114	Benin	6		2007
115	Angola	6		2000
116	U.S. Virgin Islands	5		2006
117	Paraguay	46		2007
118	Nigeria	5		2007
119	Monaco	21		1998
120	Malta	12		2006
121	Luxembourg	80		2008
122	El Salvador	5		1997
123	Belize	5		2006
124	Turkmenistan	4	government-owned and programmed	2004
125	Somalia	4	2 in Mogadishu and 2 in Hargeisa	2001
126	Senegal	4		2007
127	Liberia	4	plus 4 repeaters	2007
128	Korea, North	4	includes Korean Central Television, Mansudae Television, Korean Educational and Cultural Network, and Kaesong Television targeting South Korea	2003
129	Ireland	75	many repeaters	2001
130	Gabon	4	plus 4 repeaters	2001
131	Fiji	4	Two Main Free-to-air stations being Fiji One and Mai TV	2008
132	Congo, Democratic Republic of the	4		2001
133	Cocos (Keeling) Islands	4		2007
134	Cayman Islands	4	with cable system	2004
135	Burma	4		2008
136	Brunei	4	includes 2 UHF stations broadcasting a subscription service	2006
137	Bahrain	4		1997
138	Yemen	3	including one Egypt-based station that broadcasts in Yemen; plus several repeaters	2007
139	Tonga	3	Tonga has no principal official television broadcasters	2004
140	Togo	3	plus 2 repeaters	1997
141	Tanzania	3		1999
142	Suriname	3	plus 7 repeaters	2000
143	Sudan	3		1997
144	Papua New Guinea	3	One TV station is a fully owned subsidiary of Fiji TV. All in the Port Moresby area; stations at Mt. Hagen, Goroka, Lae, and Rabaul are planned	2004
145	Nigeria	3	the government controls 2 of the broadcasting stations and 15 repeater stations	2001
146	Nicaragua	3	plus 7 repeaters	1997
147	Netherlands Antilles	3	there is also a cable service that supplies programs received from various US satellite networks and 4 Venezuelan channels	2003
148	Micronesia, Federated States of	3	cable TV also available	2004
149	Mayotte	3		2001
150	Guyana	3	1 public station; 2 private stations which relay US satellite services	1997
151	Guam	3		2006
152	Faroe Islands	3	plus 43 repeaters	1995
153	Burkina Faso	3	1 national, 2 private	NA
154	Bermuda	3		2005
155	Wallis and Futuna	2		2000
156	Sierra Leone	2		1999
157	Seychelles	2	plus 9 repeaters	1997
158	Sao Tome and Principe	2		2001
159	Samoa	2		2002
160	Saint Lucia	2	1 commercial broadcast station and 1 community antenna television or CATV channel	2003
161	Rwanda	2		2004
162	Namibia	2		2007
163	Mauritius	2	plus several repeaters	1997
164	Marshall Islands	2	both are US military stations; Marshalls Broadcasting Service, a cable company, operates on Majuro	2005
165	Mali	2	plus repeaters	2007
166	Jersey	2		1997
167	Haiti	2	plus a cable TV service	1997
168	Grenada	2		1997
169	Falkland Islands	2	British Forces Broadcasting Service provides multi-channel satellite service to members of UK Forces as well as islanders; cable television is available in Stanley	2006
170	Eritrea	2		2006
171	Botswana	2	1 state-owned, 1 private	NA
172	Bahamas	2		2006
173	Antigua and Barbuda	2		1997
174	Vanuatu	1		2004
175	Timor-Leste	1	Timor-Leste has one national public broadcaster	NA
176	Singapore	1	broadcasting on six channels; additional reception of numerous UHF and VHF signals originating in Malaysia and Indonesia	2006
177	San Marino	1	San Marino residents also receive broadcasts from Italy	1997
178	Saint Vincent and the Grenadines	1	plus 3 repeaters	2004
179	Saint Kitts and Nevis	1	plus 3 repeaters	2003
180	Qatar	15	plus 3 repeaters	2001
181	Palau	1	cable	2005
182	Northern Mariana Islands	1	on Saipan; in addition, 2 cable services on Saipan provide varied programming from satellite networks	2006
183	Norfolk Island	1	local programming station plus 2 repeaters that air Australian programs by satellite	2005
184	Niue	1		1997
186	Nauru	1		1997
187	Mozambique	1		2000
188	Montserrat	1		1997
189	Mauritania	1		2002
190	Maldives	1		2006
191	Malawi	1		2001
192	Madagascar	1	plus 36 repeaters	2001
193	Macau	1		2006
194	Lesotho	1		2000
195	Kiribati	1	possibly inactive	2002
196	Vatican City	1		2005
197	Guernsey	1		1997
198	Greenland	1	plus some local low-power stations, and 3 Armed Forces Radio and Television Service stations	1997
199	Gibraltar	1	plus 3 repeaters	1997
200	Gambia, The	1	government-owned	1997
201	Ethiopia	92	plus 152 repeaters	2019
202	Equatorial Guinea	1		2001
203	Dominica	1		2004
204	Djibouti	1		2001
205	Cook Islands	1	outer islands receive satellite broadcasts	2004
206	Congo	1		2001
207	Chad	4 (+5 local stations)		2020
208	Central African Republic	1		2001
209	Cape Verde	1	plus 7 repeaters	2001
210	Cameroon	1		2001
211	Burundi	4	TV Nationale, Renaissance TV, Heritage TV,& Television Salama	2012
212	British Virgin Islands	1	plus 1 cable company	1997
213	British Indian Ocean Territory	1		1997
214	Bhutan	1		2007
215	Barbados	1	plus 2 cable channels	2004
216	Aruba	1		1997
217	Antarctica	1	cable system with 6 channels; American Forces Antarctic Network-McMurdo - information for US bases only	2002
218	Anguilla	1		1997
219	American Samoa	1		2006
220	Wake Island	0		2005
221	Tuvalu	1		2024
222	Turks and Caicos Islands	0	broadcasts received from The Bahamas; 2 cable television networks	2003
223	South Georgia and the South Sandwich Islands	0		2003
224	Saint Pierre and Miquelon	0	2 repeaters rebroadcast programs from France, Canada, and the US	1997
225	Saint Helena	3	3 television channels are received via satellite and distributed by UHF	2005
226	Isle of Man	0	receives broadcasts from the UK and satellite	1999
227	(United Kingdom) Akrotiri and Dhekelia	0	British Forces Broadcasting Service provides multi-channel satellite service to Akrotiri, Dhekelia, and Nicosia	2006
228	Christmas Island	0	TV broadcasts received via satellite from mainland Australia	2006
229	Andorra	1	RTVA	1997
230	Comoros	3		N/A
231	Guinea-Bissau	1		2005
232	Liechtenstein	1	1FLTV	1997
233	Svalbard	N/A		N/A
234	Western Sahara	1	TV station in Tindouf, the Refugee Camps' capital	NA
