= Voice of Korea =

International broadcasting service of North Korea

- Logo of the Korean service of Voice of Korea
- Type: International broadcasting
- Country: North Korea

Ownership
- Owner: Korean Central Broadcasting Committee
- Sister stations: Korean Central Broadcasting Station

History
- Launch date: October 14, 1945
- Former names: Radio Pyongyang (1945–2002)

Coverage
- Availability: International

Links
- Website: www.vok.rep.kp

Korean name
- Hangul: 조선의 소리
- RR: Joseonui sori
- MR: Chosŏnŭi sori

Voice of Korea (Korean: 조선의 소리) is the international broadcasting service of North Korea. It broadcasts primarily information in Chinese, Spanish, German, English, French, Russian, Japanese and Arabic. Until 2002 it was known as Radio Pyongyang. The interval signal is identical to that of Korean Central Television and Korean Central Broadcasting Station.

== History ==
The origins of Voice of Korea can be traced to 1936 and the radio station JBBK. Operated by the occupying Japanese forces, JBBK broadcast a first and second program as part of Japan's radio network that covered the Korean Peninsula from Seoul.

The station was founded in October 1945 as Radio Pyongyang, and officially inaugurated programming on the 14th, with a live broadcast of the victory speech of Kim Il Sung when he returned to Pyongyang at the end of World War II.

The first foreign broadcast was in Chinese on 16 March 1947. Japanese-language broadcasts began in 1950, followed by English (1951), French and Russian (1963), Spanish (1965), Arabic (1970), and German (1983).

By 1960, Radio Pyongyang broadcast 159 hours of programming every week. In 1970, weekly broadcasting hours totaled 330 hours and by 1980, 597 hours. In 1990 weekly broadcasting time fell to 534 hours per week, 529 in 1994, and 364 in 1996.

In 2002, the station was renamed Voice of Korea.

== Programming ==
Unlike most international broadcasters, Voice of Korea does not broadcast an interval signal in the minutes leading up to the start of the transmission. It instead starts broadcasting the interval signal (the first few notes of the "Song of General Kim Il Sung") on the hour.

A typical program line-up begins with the interval signal, followed by the station announcement "This is Voice of Korea". After the announcement, the national anthem, "Song of General Kim Il Sung" and "Song of General Kim Jong Il" are played. The songs are followed by a news broadcast consisting of Korean Central News Agency items with small adjustments for the radio. If there are any items about Kim Il Sung, Kim Jong Il or Kim Jong-un, these are the top bulletins. On the station's website, Kim Jong Un's full name is used whenever he is mentioned in a story, and his name (as well as those of Kim Il Sung and Kim Jong Il) appear 10% larger than the rest of the story's text.

The news items are typically one day behind the news of the domestic service Korean Central Broadcasting Station. The news is followed by music and an excerpt from Kim Il Sung's memoirs With the Century. After the memoirs, there is more music and feature stories, sometimes followed by an editorial. The 57-minute broadcast concludes with frequency information and a sign-off message.

In the past, the station broadcast coded messages to North Korean spies. This practice ended with the 2000 June 15th North–South Joint Declaration. In 2006, Voice of Korea started broadcasting on 11545 kHz, the same frequency as the former Lincolnshire Poacher numbers station. While it is unknown whether this was an intentional effort to interfere with Poacher's propagation or an accident, it is not unknown for Voice of Korea to unintentionally jam its own signal by transmitting programmes in different languages simultaneously on the same frequency.

== Broadcasting ==
Voice of Korea broadcasts on HF or shortwave radio frequencies, as well as on medium wave on 621 kHz for Japanese broadcasts aimed at neighbouring Japan. Two frequencies – 7570 kHz and 7580 kHz – are well out of the ITU-allocated shortwave broadcast bands (in this case the 41 metre band), making them less susceptible to interference and less likely to be listenable on older receivers. Recently, it has increased the share of satellite broadcasting.

Most of the broadcasts are transmitted from the Kujang shortwave transmitter site (five 200 kW transmitters), approximately 25 km from the city of Kujang. (40°04′42.1″N 126°06′42.4″E) A transmitter site in Kanggye (also five 200 kW) is used as well. A site in Pyongyang (10 transmitters of 200 kW) is also in use.

On occasion, Voice of Korea has missed its regular service. The interruptions have not been explained by Voice of Korea, but they are thought to be due to engineering works at the transmitter sites, faulty equipment or because of power outages. In 2012 they occurred when the country was facing one of its worst electricity shortages in years. The off-air periods also affect North Korea's own jamming signals designed to prevent reception of South Korean stations such as Echo of Hope, Voice of the People, and KBS Hanminjok Radio.

Voice of Korea broadcasts on the Ekspress-103 satellite along with Korean Central Broadcasting Station (KCBS) and Korean Central Television.

Currently (as of 11 March 2021), it seems that several foreign language programmes are identical to each other, as exactly the same music is played at the same time. Only the spoken and translated parts of the programme have been amended to match the respective program language. This could be monitored by switching from the German evening program on 6170 kHz at 19:00 UTC to the Spanish program on 7570 kHz at 19:00 UTC and back. It also seems that the shortwave transmitter, which is used for the German language service, has a rather bad modulation. The transmitter for the Spanish programme seems in better shape.

=== Schedules ===
This is a list of broadcasts of Voice of Korea by language with summer frequencies used from late March to late October, and winter frequencies used from late October to the end of March, via Shortwave Info and Shortwave Live. Exact frequencies (down to tens of hertz) are shown for all frequencies with an offset greater than 5 hertz down and 4 hertz above. The “v” symbol (which stands for variable) after a frequency indicates that specific frequency experiences drift and may not exactly be on the frequency shown here. All times are in UTC.

==== Arabic ====
All Arabic broadcasts are transmitted from Kujang.

Starts	Ends	Frequencies (kHz)	Target area
15:00	15:57	9890.01, 11645 (all year)	Middle East and North Africa
17:00	17:57	9890.01, 11645 (all year)	Middle East and North Africa

==== Chinese ====
All Chinese broadcasts are transmitted from Kujang.

Starts	Ends	Frequencies (kHz)	Target area
21:00	21:57	9875.01, 11635 (all year)	China
22:00	23:57	9875.01, 11635 (all year)	China
05:00	05:57	7220, 9445.29v, 9730 (all year)	Northeast Asia
08:00	08:57	7220, 9445.29v (all year)	Northeast Asia
11:00	11:57	7220, 9445.29v (all year)	Northeast Asia
21:00	21:57	7235, 9444.97 (all year)	Northeast Asia
22:00	22:57	7235, 9444.97 (all year)	Northeast Asia
13:00	13:57	11735.01v, 13650 (6185, 9850 winter)	Southeast Asia
03:00	03:57	13650.22, 15105.26v (all year)	Southeast Asia
06:00	06:57	13650.22, 15105.26v all year)	Southeast Asia

==== English ====
All English broadcasts are transmitted from Kujang.

Starts	Ends	Frequencies (kHz)	Target area
04:00	04:57	11735, 13760.02, 15179.95 (all year)	Central and South America
10:00	10:57	11709.96, 15180.24v (6170.1, 9434.97 winter)	Central and South America
13:00	13:57	13760.41v, 15245.25 (7570.24v, 12015.21 winter)	Europe
15:00	15:57	13760.41v, 15245.25 (7570.24v, 12015.21 winter)	Europe
18:00	18:57	13760.41v, 15245.25 (7570.24v, 12015.21 winter)	Europe
21:00	21:57	13760.41v, 15245.25 (7570.24v, 12015.21 winter)	Europe
16:00	16:57	9890.01, 11645 (all year)	Middle East and Northern Africa
19:00	19:57	9875.01, 11635 (all year)	Middle East and Northern Africa
13:00	13:57	9435, 11709.96 (all year)	North America
15:00	15:57	9435, 11709.96 (all year)	North America
04:00	04:57	7220, 9445.29v, 9730 (all year)	Northeast Asia
06:00	06:57	7220, 9445.29v, 9730 (all year)	Northeast Asia
19:00	19:57	7210, 11909.96 (all year)	Southern Africa
05:00	05:57	13650.22, 15105.26v (all year)	Southeast Asia
10:00	10:57	11735.01v, 13650 (6185, 9850 winter)	Southeast Asia

==== French ====
All French broadcasts are transmitted from Kujang.

Starts	Ends	Frequencies (kHz)	Target area
06:00	06:57	11735, 13760.02v, 15179.95 (all year)	Central and South America
11:00	11:57	11709.96, 15180.24 (6170.1, 9435 winter)	Central and South America
14:00	14:57	13760.41v, 15245.25 (7570.24v, 12015.21 winter)	Europe
16:00	16:57	13760.41v, 15245.25 (7570.24v, 12015.21 winter)	Europe
20:00	20:57	13760.41v, 15245.25 (7570.24v, 12015.21 winter)	Europe
14:00	14:57	9435, 11709.96 (all year)	North America
16:00	16:57	9435, 11709.96 (all year)	North America
04:00	04:57	13650.22, 15105.26v (all year)	Southeast Asia
11:00	11:57	11735.01v, 13650 (6185, 9850.01 winter)	Southeast Asia
18:00	18:57	7210, 11909.96 (all year)	Southern Africa
18:00	18:57	9875.01, 11635 (all year)	Middle East and North Africa

==== German ====
All German broadcasts are transmitted from Kujang.

Starts	Ends	Frequencies (kHz)	Target area
16:00	16:57	9425, 12015.21 (6170.1, 9425 winter)	Europe
18:00	18:57	9425, 12015.21 (6170.1, 9425 winter)	Europe
19:00	19:57	9425, 12015.21 (6170.1, 9425 winter)	Europe

==== Japanese ====
All Japanese broadcasts are transmitted from Kujang, except for broadcasts on 621 kHz and 6070 kHz, which are transmitted from Chongjin-Ranam and Kanggye respectively.

Starts	Ends	Frequencies (kHz)	Target area
07:00	07:57	621, 9650, 11865.21v (621, 7580, 9650 winter)	Japan
08:00	08:50	621, 9650, 11865.21v (621, 7580, 9650 winter)	Japan
09:00	09:57	621, 6070, 9650, 11865.21v (621, 6070, 7580, 9650 winter)	Japan
10:00	10:50	621, 6070, 9650, 11865.21v (621, 6070, 7580, 9650 winter)	Japan
11:00	11:57	621, 6070, 9650, 11865.21v (621, 6070, 7580, 9650 winter)	Japan
12:00	12:50	621, 6070, 9650, 11865.21v (621, 6070, 7580, 9650 winter)	Japan
21:00	21:50	621, 9650, 11865.21v (621, 7580.13, 9650 winter)	Japan
22:00	22:57	621, 9650, 11865.21v (621, 7580.13, 9650 winter)	Japan
23:00	23:50	621, 9650, 11865.21v (621, 7580.13, 9650 winter)	Japan

==== KCBS (Korean) ====
All broadcasts are transmitted from Kujang. Broadcasts follow a more KCBS-like format, but these broadcasts start without the Song of General Kim Il Sung and Song of General Kim Jong Il except on special occasions.

Starts	Ends	Frequencies (kHz)	Target area
09:00	09:50	7220, 9445.29v (all year)	Northeast Asia
12:00	12:50	11709.96, 15180.24v (6170.1, 9434.97 winter)	Central and South America
12:00	12:50	11735.01v, 13650 (6185, 9850 winter)	Southeast Asia
14:00	14:50	11735.01v, 13650 (6185, 9850 winter)	Southeast Asia
17:00	17:50	13760.41v, 15245.25 (7570.24v, 12015.21 winter)	Europe
17:00	17:50	9435, 11709.96 (all year)	North America
20:00	20:50	9425, 12015.21 (6170.1, 9425 winter)	Europe
20:00	20:50	7210, 11909.96 (all year)	Southern Africa
20:00	20:50	9875.01, 11635 (all year)	Middle East and Northern Africa
23:00	23:50	13760.41v, 15245.25 (7570.24v, 12015.21 winter)	Europe
23:00	23:50	7235, 9444.97, 9875.01, 11635 (all year)	Northeast Asia

==== Russian ====
All Russian broadcasts are transmitted from Kujang.

Starts	Ends	Frequencies (kHz)	Target area
07:00	07:57	9875, 11735.01v (Far East), 15245.25 (European) (all year)	Russia
08:00	08:57	9875, 11735.01v (Far East), 15245.25 (European) (all year)	Russia
14:00	14:57	9425, 12015.21 (6170.1, 9425 winter)	European Russia
15:00	15:57	9425, 12015.21 (6170.1, 9425 winter)	European Russia
17:00	17:57	9425, 12015.21 (6170.1, 9425 winter)	European Russia

==== Spanish ====
All Spanish broadcasts are transmitted from Kujang (frequency update: 03/2021, as announced on air, see also ADDX)

Starts	Ends	Frequencies (kHz)	Target area
03:00	03:57	11735, 13760.02v, 15179.95 (all year)	Central and South America
05:00	05:57	11735, 13760.02v, 15179.95 (all year)	Central and South America
19:00	19:57	13760.41v, 15245.25 (7570.24v, 12015.21 winter)	Europe
22:00	22:57	13760.41v, 15245.25 (7570.24v, 12015.21 winter)	Europe

== See also ==
- Propaganda in North Korea
- List of radio stations in North Korea
- Censorship in North Korea
- Media of North Korea
