= A New Spring In The Field Of Manchurian Cranes =

- Korean: 백학벌의 새봄
- Genre: Drama
- Written by: Kim Song Rim
- Directed by: Om Chang Kol; Kim Chol U
- Creative director: Kim Chol
- Starring: Ri Yu Kyong; Choe Hyon; Mun Il Chol; Kim Ran Hui; Ri Kum Chol
- Composer: Pak Byong U
- Country of origin: North Korea
- Original language: Korean
- No. of episodes: 22

Production
- Producer: Ri Song Un
- Cinematography: Yu Song Bok
- Production company: TV Drama Production Company

Original release
- Network: Korean Central Television
- Release: April 16 – June 24, 2025

A New Spring In The Field Of Manchurian Cranes (Korean: 백학벌의 새봄; MR: Paekhakpŏrŭi saebom; lit. 'New Spring of Paekhak Field') is a 2025 North Korean television drama series broadcast on Korean Central Television.

== Cast ==
- Ri Yu Kyong as Kyong Mi, an agricultural researcher
- Choe Hyon as Yong Dok, a prosecutor who is Ri's boyfriend for more than four years.

== Production ==
The drama is linked to the Exaggeration Prevention Act of 2022, which penalizes exaggerations and false reporting, especially in the agriculture sector.

Collaboration with Paeksok Farm in Sinchon County, South Hwanghae Province was credited in the production of the film. The usage of new filming techniques such as drone photography was also acknowledged.

== Release ==
It was originally aired on Korean Central Television from April 16 to June 24, 2025 and had 22 episodes. Two back-to-back episodes were broadcast every Wednesday, which is atypical in North Korean television.

== Reception ==
Yee Ji-sun, a researcher at the Korea Institute for National Unification noted that the series adopted tropes typically seen in South Korean drama and interprets the shift as to divert North Koreans from consuming foreign media.

The July issue of the Geumsu Gangsan periodical reported that the A New Spring In The Field Of Manchurian Cranes had "high viewership ratings".
