= Pyongyang TV Tower =

North Korean telecommunications tower

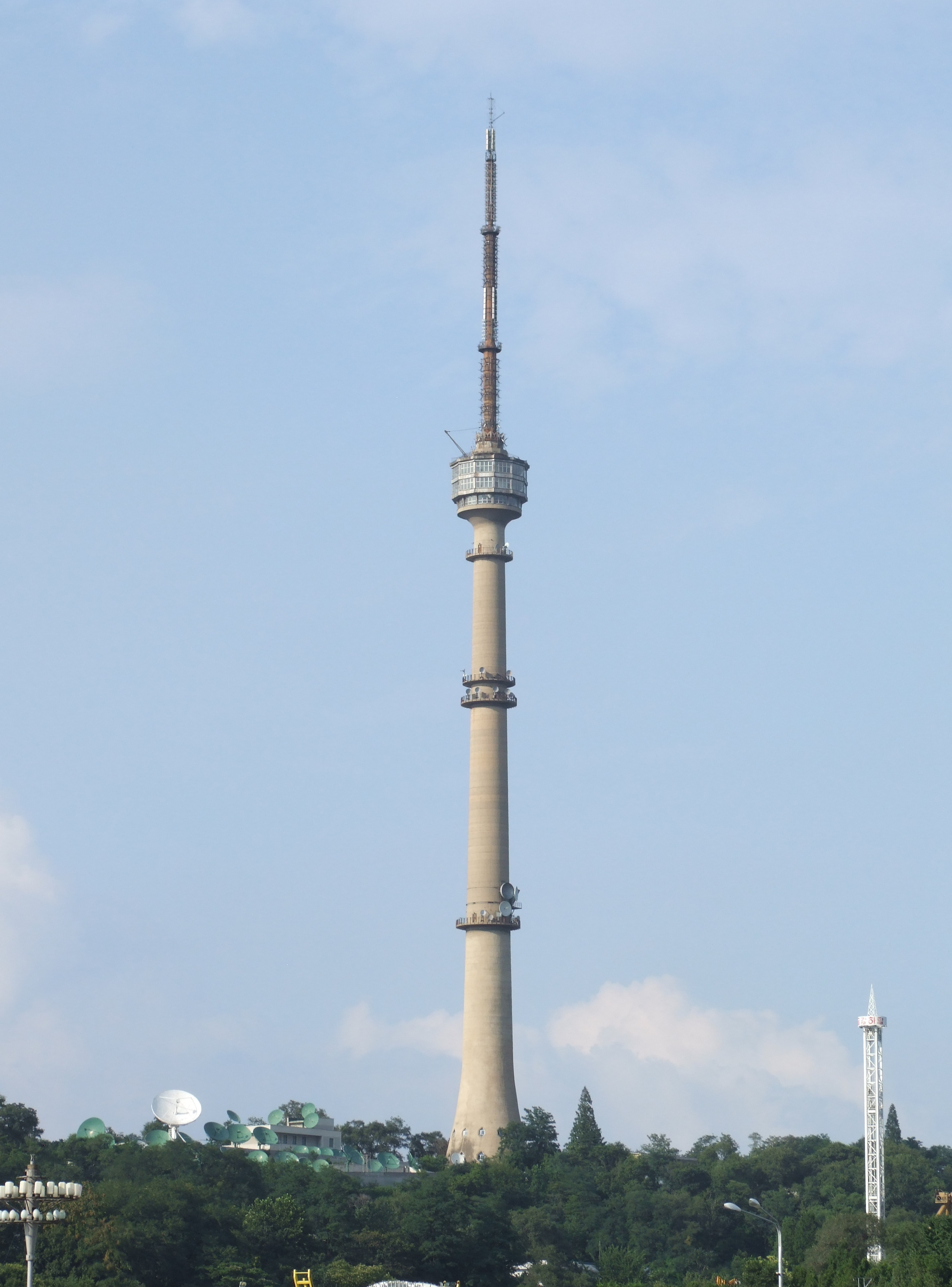
- Pyongyang TV Tower

- Location within Pyongyang

General information
- Status: Completed
- Type: Communication tower
- Location: Pyongyang
- Coordinates: 39°3′0″N 125°45′31″E
- Completed: 1968, c. 2024 (renovation)

Height
- Roof: 150 meters

- Pyongyang TV Tower
- Hangul: 평양텔레비죤탑
- Hanja: 平壤텔레비죤塔
- Revised Romanization: Pyeongyang Tellebijyon Tap
- McCune–Reischauer: P'yŏngyang T'ellebijyon T'ap

The Pyongyang TV Tower is a free-standing concrete TV tower with an observation deck and a panorama restaurant at a height of 150 metres (490 ft) in Pyongyang, North Korea. The tower stands in Kaeson Park in Moranbong-guyok, north of Kim Il-sung Stadium. The tower broadcasts signals for Korean Central Television.

== History ==
It was built in 1967 to enhance the broadcasting area, which was very poor at the time, and to start colour TV broadcasts.

The Pyongyang TV Tower is chiefly based on the design of the Ostankino Tower in Moscow, which was built at the same time.

== Features ==
There are broadcast antennas and technical equipment at the height of 34.5, 65, 67.5 and 85 metres (113, 213, 221 and 279 ft), located at circular platforms. An observation deck is located 94 metres (308 ft) above the ground, and the tower is topped by a 50-metre (160 ft) antenna. It uses its high-gain reflector antennas and panel antennas to produce a wide coverage of Analog and Digital TV reception, as well for FM radio reception.

=== Broadcasts ===
It publicly broadcasts 4 known analog and digital television channels, KCTV (Korean Central Television), Athletic Television, a sports channel, Ryongnamsan Television, an educational channel, and Mansudae Television, an entertainment channel, with Mansudae only being broadcast on Weekends. It also broadcast FM radio stations of Korean Central Broadcasting Station and Pyongyang FM Broadcasting Station.

== See also ==
- List of towers
- Television in North Korea
- Namsan Seoul Tower (equivalent in South Korea)
