= List of North Korean television series =

This is a list of North Korean television programmes or series. For North Korean multi-part films and film series see list of North Korean films.

== List ==
| Year | Title | Director | Cast | Genre | Notes |
|---|---|---|---|---|---|
| 1958 | Chonbok and Mangil (천복이와 만길이) | | | Drama | |
| 1977 | Squirrel and Hedgehog | Kim Jun-Ok (Episode 1~4), Kim Young-Cheol, Kim Gwang-Seong, Do Cheol, Oh Sin-Hyeok, Yun Young-Gil, Lee Seok-Hoon, Lee Cheol | | Animated series | |
| 1980 or 1992 | A New Spring in Sokgaeul (석개울의 새봄) | | | Drama | Based on a novel by Chon Se Bong. Drama about change of agricultural villages into collective farms. |
| 1990 | Streaming ribbon (휘날리는 댕기) | | | Drama | 4 episodes |
| 1994 | Motto (좌우명) | | | Drama | 10 episodes |
| 1995 | Paekkumsan | | | Drama | |
| 1995 | The legacy of an old soldier (로병의 유산) | | | Drama | Was aired again in 2014, 7 episodes |
| 1997 | House Standing again Today (오늘도 서 있는 집) | | | Drama | 8 episodes |
| 1999 | Notes of a Defender (한 보위일군의 수기) | | | Drama | 9 episodes |
| 2000 | High Noon of Life (인생의 절정) | | | Drama | 8 episodes |
| 2000 | Even though the star is far away (별은 멀리 있어도) | | | Drama | 10 episodes |
| 2000 | Aspiration (열망) | | | Drama | |
| 2000 | A Lark (종달새) | | | Drama | |
| 2000 VHS published in 2004–2005 | Our Warm House (or Our Warm Home) (따뜻한 우리집) | | | Medical drama | Takes place at Pyongyang Maternity Hospital About daily life in North Korea, in two parts. |
| 2000 | Red Soil (붉은 흙) | | | Drama | Based on life of Ri Ryong-jin |
| 2000 | The First Chief of Oil Department (첫 연유국장) | | | Drama | Based on actual events |
| 2001 | Advanced technology (첨단선) | | | Drama | 7 episodes |
| 2001 | Horizon (수평선) | | | Drama | 10 episodes |
| 2001 | Vitrotaewubahwa (윋댈롣태웹밯화) | | | Drama | Over 1000 episodes Should be done |
| 2002 | Grab the satba (샅바를 잡아라) | | | Drama | |
| 2002 | Don't Wake Up Mom (엄마를 깨우지 말아) | | | Soap opera | In three parts, about a working couple |
| 2002 | Love and hate (사랑과 증오) | | | Drama based on a "true story" | |
| 2003 | Coal Miner (탄부) | | | Drama | Based on novel of Kim Mun Chang. |
| 2003 | Sea route (항로) | | | Drama | 10 episodes |
| 2003 | Responsible person (1번수) | | | Drama | 10 episodes. A drama about a programmer who develops a game program of go. |
| 2003 | Hot plains (뜨거운 평야) | | | Drama | |
| 2004 | In the trials (시련 속에서) | | | Drama | 13 episodes |
| 2005 | The Trustworthy (남막컴) | | | Drama/Children's Program | Over 1000 Episodes Should Be Done.(2005 - 2008) |
| 2006 | The Class Continues (수업은 계속된다) | | | Drama | About daily life in North Korea, in eight parts |
| 2007 | Sayuksin (사육신) | | | Drama | south korea co production |
| 2009 | The Spring of Love (사랑의 샘) | | | Drama | About daily life in North Korea, in three parts |
| 2010s | Kye Wol Hyang | | | Historical drama | Takes place during Imjin War in the 16th century |
| 2010 | The name of that girl (그 처녀의 이름) | | | Drama | |
| 2010 | Wangjaesan (왕재산) | | | Drama | |
| 2011 | Our Women's Soccer Team (우리녀자축구팀) | | | Drama | About daily life in North Korea, in three parts |
| 2012 | Chastisement (징벌) | | | Historical drama | Takes place at the time of March First Movement |
| 2012 | Devote Yourself (자기를 바치라) | | | Drama | |
| 2013 | Waiting for father (기다리는 아버지) | | | Drama | |
| 2015 | Bulletproof Wall | Um Chang-gol | Heon Sung-joon | Historical drama, psychological thriller | The series is set in the 1940s Korea under Japanese occupation. Narrator often details the historical timeline, from North Korean viewpoint, compared to the one portrayed in the series. The series contains CGI animated action scenes. Cast actors of Russian origin appear in the series. |
| 2015 | Pyochang | | | Drama | |
| 2016 | Value it preciously (귀중히 여기라) | | | Drama | |
| 2017 | Glow of the North (북방의 노을) | | | Drama | |
| 2018 | Insam diggers in the year of Imjin (임진년의 심마니들) | | | Drama | |
| 2022 | The Last Unicorn (마지막 한알) | | | Drama | Based on true story of North Korean table tennis player Pak Yung-sun |
| 2023 | A Note of an Official of the Prosecutor's Office (한 검찰일군의 수기) | | | Drama | |
| 2025 | A New Spring In The Field Of Manchurian Cranes (백학벌의 새봄) | | Ri Yu-gyong, Choe Hyon | Drama | |
| | It's So Funny | | | Comedy | One of the world's longest running stage-comedy variety shows ever. It has been running since the 1970s. |
| | Common Sense | | | Propaganda | Included the five-episode series Let's trim our hair in accordance with the socialist lifestyle in 2004 |
| 2005 | Child Broadcast Time (아동방송시간) | | | Children's Program | Compilation of North Korean cartoons. |

== See also ==
- List of North Korean actors
- List of North Korean films
- List of North Korean operas
- Television in North Korea
- Welcome to Pyongyang Animal Park, a film that was made originally as a two episode television series
