= Ekspress-AMU7 =

Russian communications satellite

- Names: Экспресс-АМU7; Ekspress-AMU7; Express-AMU7
- Mission type: Communications
- Operator: RSCC
- COSPAR ID: 2021-123B
- SATCAT no.: 50002
- Website: https://eng.rscc.ru/
- Mission duration: 15 years (planned); 3 years, 3 months, 11 days (in progress)

Spacecraft properties
- Spacecraft: Ekspress-AMU7
- Spacecraft type: Ekspress
- Bus: Ekspress-1000N
- Manufacturer: ISS Reshetnev (bus); Thales Alenia Space (payload)
- Launch mass: 1,980 kg (4,370 lb)

Start of mission
- Launch date: 12 December 2021, 12:07 UTC
- Rocket: Proton-M / Briz-M
- Launch site: Baikonur, Site 200/39
- Contractor: Khrunichev State Research and Production Space Center
- Entered service: 4 May 2022

Orbital parameters
- Reference system: Geocentric orbit
- Regime: Geostationary orbit
- Longitude: 145° East

Transponders
- Band: 37 transponders: 16 C-band; 20 Ku-band; 1 L-band
- Coverage area: Russia

Ekspress-AMU7 (Russian: Экспресс-АМU7, meaning Express-AMU7) is a Russian domestic communications satellite. It belongs to the Russian Satellite Communications Company (RSCC) based in Moscow, Russia. To provide of communications services (digital television, telephony, videoconferencing, data transmission, the Internet access, presidential and governmental mobile communications) and to deploy satellite networks by applying VSAT technology to Russia. Replacement for Ekspress-A4.

== Satellite description ==
The satellite has a total of 37 transponders, of which 16 C-band, 20 Ku-band and 1 L-band transponders. The Ekspress-AMU7 Russian domestic communications satellite, built by Information Satellite Systems Reshetnev (ISS Reshetnev) for Kosmicheskaya Svyaz. The communications payload was built by the French company Thales Alenia Space, in Italy.

== Launch ==
Ekspress-AMU7 was launched on a Proton-M / Briz-M launch vehicle on 13 December 2021, at 12L07 UTC, from Site 200/39 at Baikonur Cosmodrome, Kazakhstan.

== Mission ==
Ekspress-AMU7 was launched with Ekspress-AMU3.

== See also ==
- Ekspress-AMU3
