= It's So Funny =

North Korean comedy television series

It's So Funny (Korean: 화술소품무대:재담 (Note: Considering the records of programs aired during the times accessible at the site of the South Korean ministry of unification (Individual episodes or lists are linked as follows since the link cannot be accessed unless manually finding it since the current version only allows easy access until 2011 as of 2021.) https://nkinfo.unikorea.go.kr/nkp/theme/listNkTv.do#, the English title mentioned in the title could not be a translation, but a working title that was chosen by Reuters or the translator present at the interview. The closest show that can be identified with the show within the time frame near the release date of the Reuters article was this particular segment, aired in April 9th, 2010, as it can be found here. https://nkinfo.unikorea.go.kr/nkp/theme/nktvprgrList.do It could be referencing this episode from April 5th, 2010, which was titled 사기납니다, which means "This boosts morale!" https://nkinfo.unikorea.go.kr/nkp/theme/nktvprgrList.do)) is a North Korean comedy television show. These types of shows have been on the air since the 1970s, the start of state programming in North Korea, making them some of the world's longest-running television comedies as well as a staple of North Korean television.

The show usually consists of a man and a woman in military uniform having a conversation. The two protagonists sometimes sing, dance and try slapstick, involving activities which exceed the boundaries of common sense. The show is intended to improve troop morale. Its themes are often repetitive and its humor obscure, but its propaganda content in favor of the North Korean leadership is blunt.

== See also ==
- List of North Korean television series
