= Korean Central Broadcasting Committee =

State-owned broadcaster of North Korea

Korean Central Broadcasting Committee (KCBC)
- Type: Broadcast radio and television
- Country: North Korea
- Availability: National; International
- Headquarters: Chonsung-dong, Moranbong District, Pyongyang, North Korea
- Owner: State Affairs Commission of the Democratic People's Republic of Korea
- Key people: Hwang Yong-bo (chairman)
- Launch date: 14 October 1945; 80 years ago (radio); 3 March 1963; 63 years ago (television)
- Picture format: 1080i (HDTV)
- Official website: www.gnu.rep.kp

Korean name
- Hangul: 조선중앙방송위원회
- Hanja: 朝鮮中央放送委員會
- RR: Joseon jungang bangsong wiwonhoe
- MR: Chosŏn chungang pangsong wiwŏnhoe

Alternate name
- Hangul: 조선중앙방송
- Hanja: 朝鮮中央放送
- RR: Joseon jungang bangsong
- MR: Chosŏn chungang pangsong

The Radio and Television Broadcasting Committee of the Democratic People's Republic of Korea (Korean: 조선중앙방송위원회), also known as the Korean Central Broadcasting Committee and Korean Central Broadcasting (조선중앙방송), is a state-owned broadcaster of North Korea.

The committee is under the Cabinet of North Korea, but its personnel is chosen and appointed by the Propaganda and Agitation Department (PAD) of the Workers' Party of Korea. The PAD also assigns tasks to the committee. Hwang Yong-bo is the chairman of the committee.

The committee is base in Chonsung-dong, Moranbong District, Pyongyang. It is a member of the Asia-Pacific Broadcasting Union. The committee has a sports team in the annual Paektusan Prize Games of Civil Servants.

== Services ==
All four major television stations and 200 radio stations are controlled by the committee. Only the Pyongyang FM Broadcasting Station, Pyongyang Broadcasting Station, and the Voice of National Salvation are operated under the United Front Department of the Workers' Party of Korea instead. The committee is also owner and operator of the Korean Central News Agency.

=== Television ===
- Korean Central Television
- Mansudae Television
- Ryongnamsan Television
- Athletic Television

=== Radio ===
- Korean Central Broadcasting Station (domestic radio network)
- Third Broadcast (cable radio network used for sensitive public announcements)
- Voice of Korea (international radio network)

== Notable anchors ==
- Ri Chun-hee

== See also ==
- Korea Communications Commission
- Censorship in North Korea
- Media of North Korea
- Telecommunications in North Korea
- Radio jamming in Korea
- Television in North Korea
- State Broadcasting Committee of the GDR
