= Ekspress-AM3 =

Russian communications satellite

- Names: Экспресс-АМ3; Ekspress-AM3; Express-AM3
- Mission type: Communications
- Operator: Russian Satellite Communications Company (RSCC)
- COSPAR ID: 2005-023A
- SATCAT no.: 28707
- Website: eng.rscc.ru
- Mission duration: 12 years (planned); 17 years (achieved)

Spacecraft properties
- Spacecraft: Ekspress-AM3
- Spacecraft type: KAUR
- Bus: MSS-2500-GSO
- Manufacturer: NPO PM (bus); Alcatel Space (payload)
- Launch mass: 2,542 kg (5,604 lb)
- Dry mass: 596 kg (1,314 lb)
- Power: 6 kW

Start of mission
- Launch date: 24 June 2005, 19:41:00 UTC
- Rocket: Proton-K / DM-2M
- Launch site: Baikonur, Site 200/39
- Contractor: Khrunichev State Research and Production Space Center
- Entered service: August 2005

End of mission
- Disposal: Graveyard orbit
- Deactivated: 2022

Orbital parameters
- Reference system: Geocentric orbit
- Regime: Geostationary orbit
- Longitude: 140° East (2005–?); 103° East (?–2022)

Transponders
- Band: 29 transponders: 16 C-band; 12 Ku-band; 1 L-band
- Coverage area: Russia, CIS

Ekspress-AM3 (Russian: Экспресс-АМ3, meaning Express-AM3) is a retired Russian domestic communications satellite. It belongs to Russian Satellite Communications Company (RSCC). It provided communications services (digital television, telephony, videoconferencing, data transmission, Internet access) and deployed satellite networks by applying VSAT technology to Russia and its neighbors (CIS).

== Design ==
The satellite has 29 transponders: 16 C-band, 12 Ku-band and 1 L-band transponders. It was built by Information Satellite Systems Reshetnev (NPO PM) for Kosmicheskaya Svyaz. The communications payload was built by French company Alcatel Space.

== Launch ==
Ekspress-AM3 was launched by Khrunichev State Research and Production Space Center, using a Proton-K / Blok DM-2M launch vehicle. The launch took place at 19:41:00 UTC on 24 June 2005, from Site 200/39 at Baikonur Cosmodrome, Kazakhstan. It deployed into geostationary transfer orbit (GTO) and raised itself into an operational geostationary orbit using its apogee motor.
