= Kazunari Ishimaru =

Kazunari Ishimaru from the Memory Division, Toshiba Corporation Semiconductor and Storage Products Company, Yokohama, Japan was named Fellow of the Institute of Electrical and Electronics Engineers (IEEE) in 2014 for contributions to static random access memory and complementary metal-oxide semiconductor devices.
