= Ryongnamsan Television =

North Korean educational TV channel

Ryongnamsan Television 룡남산텔레비죤
- Ryongnamsan
- Country: North Korea
- Broadcast area: Pyongyang, Kaesong (analog), Nationwide (via DTT and Manbang IPTV)
- Headquarters: Pyongyang, North Korea

Programming
- Language: Korean
- Picture format: 1080i 16:9 HDTV

Ownership
- Owner: Korean Central Broadcasting Committee (University Student TV Department of KCBC)
- Sister channels: Korean Central Television; Mansudae; Athletic

History
- Launched: 1 April 1971; 55 years ago
- Former names: Kaesong Television (1971–1997); Korean Educational and Cultural Network (1997–2012)

Availability

Terrestrial
- Analogue (PAL): Channel R9 (199.25 MHz in Pyongyang)
- Digital: DVB-T2
- Video on demand: Manbang

Streaming media
- Koryo Front: Ryongnamsan Television
- Juche TV: Ryongnamsan TV
- Chollima Front / Koryo TV: Ryongnamsan TV

Korean name
- Hangul: 룡남산 텔레비죤
- RR: Ryongnamsan tellebijon
- MR: Ryongnamsan t'ellebijon

Ryongnamsan Television (Korean: 룡남산텔레비죤) is a North Korean television channel that focuses on education. It is operated by the University Student TV Department of the Korean Central Broadcasting Committee. The channel schedule includes science documentaries in English, television lectures and educational programs for learning foreign languages including in English, Russian and Chinese.

== Operations ==
Ryongnamsan Television received its current name on 5 September 2012, with a logo reminiscent of the Kim Il Sung University logo and previously broadcast on Channel 9 from the Pyongyang TV Tower on a schedule operating from 19:00 to 22:00 on Monday, Wednesday and Friday, and since 2019 has been broadcasting from 18:00 to 22:00 on every weekday. The channel is additionally available on the digital terrestrial television broadcast nationwide and on Manbang on-demand service. The director is assumed to be the Head of Editorial Desk Yang Chun Won who has been in the position since 2012.

== History ==
The channel started off on 1 April 1971, initially known as "Kaesong Television". On 10 October 1991, the channel switched to color, becoming the last TV channel in the entire world to switch to color TV. In February 1997, the channel was rebranded as "Korean Educational and Cultural Network". During this period, authorities conducted experimental broadcasting and started broadcasting the channel from the television tower in Kaesong on Channel 8 in the NTSC-M format, as a way to promote North Korean culture among South Korean viewers, authorities chose this channel because South Korea's KBS1 and KBS2 were using Channel 7 and 9 but their channels were jammed by North Korean authorities, the broadcasts continued until 31 December 2012, when the analogue shutdown happened in South Korea.

== Test cards ==
As Kaesong Television, it used a modified version of the one used by Korean Central Television, with the syllables 개성 instead of 평양.

Ryongnamsan Television has used 2 different types of test cards since its current inception in 2012. One being the 4:3 test card while the 16:9 HD test cards came into use around 2016 time.

== See also ==
- Television in North Korea
