= Athletic Television =

North Korean television channel

- "Cheyuk Tellebijyeon"
- Country: North Korea
- Broadcast area: Pyongyang (via Analog), Nationwide (via DTT and Manbang IPTV)
- Headquarters: Pyongyang, North Korea

Programming
- Language: Korean
- Picture format: 1080i 16:9 HDTV (downscaled to letterboxed 4:3 576i for the SDTV feed)

Ownership
- Owner: Korean Central Broadcasting Committee
- Sister channels: Korean Central Television; Ryongnamsan; Mansudae

History
- Launched: 15 August 2015

Availability

Terrestrial
- Analog (PAL): Channel 6 (175.25 MHz) in Pyongyang
- Digital: DVB-T2
- Video on demand: Manbang

Streaming media
- Koryo Front: Sports Television
- Juche TV: Sports TV
- Chollima Front / Koryo TV: Athletic Television

Korean name
- Hangul: 체육텔레비죤
- RR: Cheyuktellebijon
- MR: Ch'eyukt'ellebijon

Athletic Television (Korean: 체육 텔레비죤), also known as Sport Television, is a state-owned sports television channel in North Korea. It started broadcasting on 15 August 2015, coinciding with the seventieth anniversary of the National Liberation Day of Korea. The channel broadcasts only on Saturdays and Sundays since its inception.

== History ==
Broadcasts began on 15 August 2015 airing only three hours a day (7pm to 10pm), six hours a week, on Saturdays and Sundays. Highlights of the first weekend on air included the female tournament of the 2015 East Asian Football Cup and the female final of the 10-metre platform of the 16th World Aquatics Championships, both featuring North Korean athletes winning gold medals. The goal of the channel was to create a "sporting fever" among the society.

At an unknown date, Athletic converted to high definition television and moved its opening time to 6pm (four hours a day). The channel carries coverage of domestic sports coverage which KCTV doesn't cover on its weekend sports block. Some international events are also broadcast, but on tape delay. It also simulcasts the 8pm news from the main channel.

== See also ==
- Television in North Korea
