= Korean Central Broadcasting Station =

North Korean domestic radio service

- Country: North Korea
- Broadcast area: National

Programming
- Language(s): Korean

Ownership
- Owner: Korean Central Broadcasting Committee
- Sister stations: Voice of Korea

History
- Founded: 10 November 1972 (current form)
- Launch date: 14 October 1945; 81 years ago
- Former names: Pyongyang Broadcasting Station

Links
- Webcast: KCBS Live; KBCS Live stream

Korean name
- Hangul: 조선중앙방송
- RR: Joseon jungang bangsong
- MR: Chosŏn chungang pangsong

The Korean Central Broadcasting Station (KCBS; Korean: 조선중앙방송) is a domestic radio station operated by the Korean Central Broadcasting Committee, a state-owned broadcaster in North Korea.

== History ==
On 26 August 1945, the broadcast signal north of the 38th parallel was cut off, and the Beijing Central Broadcasting Station stopped broadcasting. On 14 October 1945, the Pyongyang Broadcasting Station reactivated the broadcasting equipment left by the Korean Broadcasting Association before the war and began broadcasting Korean broadcasts using the Pyongyang Broadcasting Station as the call sign.

In May 1946, the Pyongyang Broadcasting Station was renamed the Pyongyang Central Broadcasting Station. On 16 March 1947, Chinese broadcasting began, marking the beginning of external broadcasting. In February 1948, the Pyongyang Central Broadcasting Station was renamed the Korean Central Broadcasting Station. In November 1948, the call sign of the radio station was changed to Korea Central Broadcasting Station. In April 1955, the Korean Central Broadcasting Station began cable broadcasting. On 14 October 1955, broadcasts to South Korea began. In December 1967, the Korean Central Broadcasting Station began to be divided into two channels: First Korean Central Broadcasting Station and Second Korean Central Broadcasting Station. On 10 November 1972, the Korean Central Broadcasting Station was reorganised. The First Korean Central Broadcasting Station was renamed the Korean Central Broadcasting Station, and the Second Korean Central Broadcasting Station was renamed Pyongyang Broadcasting Station and was separated from the Korean Central Broadcasting Station.

In 2000, 34.2% of the programs broadcast by Korean Central Broadcasting Station were praising the leaders Kim Il Sung and Kim Jong Il, 28.8% were encouraging workers to work hard, 17.4% were promoting the Juche idea, and 12% were talking about the bad condition of the people of South Korea.

In January 2024, Pyongyang Broadcasting Station, which had been operating since 1955 focused on listeners in South Korea and Japan and not officially available in North Korea, closed. Some of its former FM frequency were takeover by KCBS. It had provided 23 hours of daily programs.

== Broadcasts ==
KCBS broadcasts from 5 am to 3 am via a network of mediumwave (AM), shortwave and FM transmitters that cover the nation. The powerful transmissions can easily be heard in neighbouring countries, including South Korea where some of its frequencies are jammed. It is also relayed at certain times via the Voice of Korea, the North Korea international shortwave service. Its interval signal is identical to that of Korean Central Television and Voice of Korea. KCBS also broadcasts on the Ekspress-103 satellite.

== Programming ==
A central programme is broadcast from Pyongyang on most transmitters through the entire broadcast day, though some are reported to carry regional programming between 2 pm and 3 pm. All programming is in Korean and includes music, talk and news. Main news bulletins are broadcast at 6 am, 7 am, 10 am, midday, 3 pm, 5 pm, 8 pm, 9 pm and 10 pm.

Before the radio station started broadcasting, it first plays the interval signal of an electronic version of the beginning of "Song of General Kim Il Sung" (the opening song of the broadcast), then the North Korean national anthem is played, and then the song "Our Glorious Motherland" is played shouted by a male voice, followed by "Long live the Democratic People's Republic of Korea!" (영광스러우리조국조선민주주의인민공화국만세!) and a female voice shouted “Long live the organizer and leader of all the victories of our people, the glorious Workers' Party of Korea!” afterwards, the announcer greets the audience and read out the date of the day, and then play Song of General Kim Il Sung and the Song of General Kim Jong Il.

== See also ==
- Radio jamming in Korea
- List of radio stations in North Korea
- Propaganda in North Korea
- Censorship in North Korea
- Media of North Korea
