= Jiro Ishimaru =

Japanese journalist (born 1962)

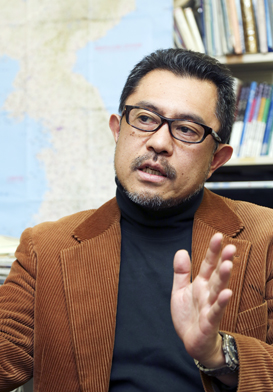
Ishimaru Jiro

Jiro Ishimaru (石丸 次郎, Ishimaru Jirō; born 1962) is a Japanese journalist known for his work covering North Korea.

== Early life ==
Ishimaru was born in 1962 in Osaka, central Japan. He developed an early interest in Korean history and culture which, after graduating from Kyoto's Doshisha University, led him to studying Korean language for two and a half years in Seoul at Yonsei University.

== Career ==
Ishimaru, now the chief editor of AsiaPress, Osaka, has spent his career reporting on North Korea. His exclusive reports have gained the attention of the global media and have been cited by Melanie Kirkpatrick, author of Escape from North Korea: The Untold Story of Asia's Underground Railroad, while his work continues to draw attention from radio, television and media. His work is further cited within academic circles.

== Research ==
Ishimaru has made some 95 reporting trips to Chinese areas bordering North Korea, interviewing more than 900 North Koreans. He has managed to enter North Korea three times and has written several books on defectors, while collaborating on several others. Ishimaru also gives talks on the changing social and political situation within North Korea. In 2002 he set up a network of North Koreans reporting under cover from their own country.

In 1993, Ishimaru completed a 1400-kilometer journey, traveling along the entire of the North Korea-China border. During his trip he encountered North Koreans who had crossed over in search of food. During his visits to the area as a freelance journalist, several North Koreans in hiding offered to return home and report for him. It was a new concept; Ishimaru decided to let the world hear their voices.

== Projects ==
In 2002, he began a new project to create a team of "citizen journalists". The first step was to teach the volunteer neophytes how to use such tools of the reporter's trade as computers and video cameras. For that they had to learn such simple English words as "switch", "on" and "off". More difficult to get across to them was an understanding of what "journalism" means in the outside world.

Materials from the reporters were smuggled out of North Korea and delivered to the Osaka office of AsiaPress. With the advance of information technology, voicemail from his North Korean contacts is now received on computers. Video footage sent out of North Korea has appeared not only in Japan and South Korea but also in the United Kingdom (Channel 4) and [the United States (PBS) (reference).

In 2008, Ishimaru founded the Japanese magazine Rimjin-gang, (named for the river that flows out of North Korea and runs along the Korean Demilitarized Zone to its outlet in the Yellow Sea), featuring articles by his reporters. In 2010, he published a 494-page English book of the same title. To date, he has trained some 20 North Koreans to become reporters. Six currently report for him, risking their lives with each assignment. Jiro Ishimaru is currently the publisher and chief editor of Rimjin-gang.
