= Mansudae Television =

North Korean educational TV station

- "Mansudae"
- Country: North Korea
- Broadcast area: Pyongyang (via Analog), Nationwide (via DTT and Manbang IPTV)
- Headquarters: Pyongyang

Programming
- Language: Korean
- Picture format: 1080i 16:9 HDTV (downscaled to letterboxed 4:3 576i for the SDTV feed)

Ownership
- Owner: Korean Central Broadcasting Committee
- Sister channels: Korean Central Television; Ryongnamsan; Athletic

History
- Launched: 1 December 1973

Availability

Terrestrial
- Analog (PAL): Channel 5 (93.25 MHz) in Pyongyang
- Digital: DVB-T2
- Video on demand: Manbang

Korean name
- Hangul: 만수대 텔레비죤
- RR: Mansudae tellebijon
- MR: Mansudae t'ellebijon

Mansudae Television (Korean: 만수대 텔레비죤) is a state-owned entertainment television channel in North Korea. It broadcasts movies, selected foreign films and entertainment programming every weekend with occasional advertising. Mansudae began transmissions on 1 December 1973, and broadcasts for three hours (19:00–22:00) on Saturdays, and nine hours (10:00–13:00, 16:00–22:00) on Sundays.

From its launch on 1 December 1973, Mansudae Television was broadcast terrestrially in Pyongyang only on analogue channel 5 (93.25 MHz) from the Pyongyang TV Tower. The channel was also made available through a special application on the Samjiyon tablet computer. Analogue broadcasting on channel 5 continued until the channel's temporary closure on 13 July 2015, and the legacy analogue television service subsequently continued to use channel 5 following the channel's return to air.

With the introduction of digital terrestrial television, the channel became available nationwide and its channel numbering changed. On the DVB-T2 service, Mansudae Television is carried as channel 3 in the multiplex broadcasting, alongside Korean Central Television, Ryongnamsan Television and Athletic Television. The digital service is separate from the older analogue channel-number allocation, with Mansudae therefore retaining channel 5 on analogue television while appearing as channel 3 on digital television.

In August 2016, the channel was also added to the Manbang IPTV service.

== Broadcasting ==
Mansudae TV 16:9 Testcard

In January 2026, Mansudae Television also became available by satellite for the first time as part of a new North Korean Ku-band multiplex on the Russian Express-AMU3 satellite. The multiplex carries Korean Central Television alongside Mansudae Television, Ryongnamsan Television and Athletic Television. While Korean Central Television is transmitted free-to-air, the other three television services, including Mansudae Television, are encrypted using the Russian GostCrypt conditional-access system. The purpose of the Ku-band transmissions has not been publicly confirmed. Possible uses include providing a backup or programme feed to terrestrial television transmitters and extending reception to areas outside the existing digital terrestrial television network.

Mansudae TV 16:9 Broadcast

Mansudae Television remains available domestically through digital terrestrial broadcasting and the Manbang IPTV platform. It is not carried on the international version of Manbang marketed to North Koreans and other Korean-speaking users living abroad, including users in China.

In August 2026, Mansudae Television began broadcasting in 1080i 16:9 high-definition television, replacing its previous standard-definition digital terrestrial and satellite feed. The channel continues to be transmitted in standard definition on its analogue terrestrial service. The change to widescreen broadcasting was accompanied by a redesign of the channel's on-screen logo, with the screen bug adopting a more rounded appearance suitable for the new 16:9 presentation.

The channel's programming has traditionally placed greater emphasis on entertainment and foreign-produced material than Korean Central Television. In addition to domestic entertainment programmes and films, its schedule includes foreign sporting events, Russian films, Chinese films, and imported animated productions. Foreign animation broadcast by the channel has included productions such as Ratatouille, Buzz Lightyear and WALL-E.

== Temporary closure ==
In July 2015, Mansudae Television ceased broadcasting for unknown reasons. However, two reasons were considered in the Newstopia online edition (South Korea): According to one reason, this step could be taken by the North Korean authorities to restrict the access of Pyongyang residents to foreign content broadcast on the channel. According to the other, reported by Radio Free Asia, in the editorial board there was an incident with unfiltered content, shown on air on the channel. It was also reported that the launch of the broadcasting of the new Athletic Television, carried out on 15 August of the same year, was made at a frequency previously owned by Mansudae Television. As a result of internal checks of the government of North Korea, the television channel was rehabilitated only in 2016 (according to other sources - in November 2015). The message of South Korean news agency Yonhap from 18 May 2016, reported that access to the television channel was proposed to be carried out through cable networks.

== Pay channel proposal ==
In March 2018, Daily NK reported that North Korean authorities had begun charging residents outside Pyongyang for access to Mansudae Television. According to the report, viewers were required to pay a 650 yuan installation fee. At the time, it was unclear whether the service was being delivered through cable television, the Manbang IPTV system or another distribution method, and whether an ongoing subscription fee was charged.

Mansudae Television is now transmitted nationwide as part of North Korea's DVB-T2 digital terrestrial television service and can be received without an additional channel subscription. The channel is also available through the domestic Manbang IPTV service, where access appears to require an additional payment or service fee. The precise pricing structure and whether the charge applies specifically to Mansudae Television or to a broader Manbang television package has not been publicly documented.

== See also ==
- Television in North Korea
