= Ri Chun-hee =

North Korean news anchor (born 1943)

- Born: 8 July 1943 (age 83); Tongchon, Gangwon, Korea, Empire of Japan
- Education: Pyongyang University of Dramatic and Cinematic Arts
- Occupation: News presenter
- Years active: 1971–present
- Employer: Korean Central Television
- Known for: Longtime chief newsreader for KCTV

Korean name
- Hangul: 리춘히
- Hanja: 李春姬
- RR: Ri Chunhi
- MR: Ri Ch'unhi

South Korean spelling
- Hangul: 이춘희
- Hanja: 李春姬
- RR: ichunhui
- MR: ich'unhŭi

Ri Chun-hee (also romanized as Ri Chun Hee or Ri Chun Hui; Korean: 리춘히 [ɾi tsʰunçi]; born 8 July 1943) is a North Korean news anchor for Korean Central Television (KCTV). She served as the network's chief presenter for decades and is known for her highly emotional and demonstrative delivery style, which has been described as passionate, aggressive, and menacing. Though she announced her retirement in 2012, she has continued to present major national announcements, particularly those concerning the activities of Kim Jong Un and significant events like military parades and nuclear tests.

== Early life and education ==
Ri was born on 8 July 1943 to a poor family in Tongchon, Gangwon Province, in what was then Japanese-occupied Korea. She studied performance art at the Pyongyang University of Dramatic and Cinematic Arts and was subsequently recruited as a newsreader by KCTV.

== Career ==
Ri began onscreen work in February 1971. She rose to become KCTV's chief news presenter and was a consistent on-air presence from the mid-1980s onward. Her career longevity was notable in a field where demotions and purges were common. Upon her retirement announcement in January 2012, she indicated she would work behind the scenes training new broadcasters. The Daily Telegraph noted she had been "entrusted with announcing great moments in North Korean history". American journalist Bob Woodward compared her to Walter Cronkite in his 2018 book Fear: Trump in the White House.

Despite her retirement, Ri has been called back to announce major national developments. These have included the claimed hydrogen bomb test in January 2016; a missile launch in February 2016; nuclear tests in September 2016 and September 2017; a missile test in November 2017; the suspension of nuclear and intercontinental ballistic missile tests in April 2018; and the June 2018 Singapore summit between Kim Jong Un and Donald Trump. On 15 April 2018, she also read a report that formally referred to Kim's wife, Ri Sol-ju, as "First Lady" for the first time.

In 2022, Kim Jong Un gifted luxury houses in Pyongyang to Ri and other elites. State media broadcast a video featuring Kim giving Ri a tour of her new home, which she narrated. Ri later stated that the home was "like a hotel" and that she and her family "stayed up all night in tears of deep gratitude for the party's benevolence".

== Style ==
Ri is known for her melodramatic style, employing an exuberant, wavering tone for praise and visible anger for denunciations. Brian Reynolds Myers, a scholar of North Korean propaganda, notes her drama training is evident in her performative delivery. She famously cried while announcing the death of Kim Il Sung in 1994 and struggled with tears announcing Kim Jong Il's death in 2011.

She typically appears in a pink Western-style suit or a traditional Korean joseon-ot, earning her the nicknames "Pink Lady" and "North Korean News Lady". The Greek satirical show Radio Arvyla has used footage of her to parody Greek news.

== See also ==
- Muhammad Saeed al-Sahhaf – Iraqi Minister of Information nicknamed "Comical Ali".
