= Korean Central News Agency =

North Korean state news agency

- Type: State-owned
- Industry: News agency
- Founded: December 5, 1946; 79 years ago
- Headquarters: 1 Potonggang-dong, Potonggang District, Pyongyang, North Korea
- Number of locations: Many municipal offices, correspondents and bureaus in six other countries
- Area served: International
- Key people: Kim Chang-gwang (Director General)
- Services: Media
- Owner: Korean Central Broadcasting Committee
- Number of employees: 800

Korean name
- Hangul: 조선중앙통신; 조선통신사
- RR: Joseon jungang tongsin; Joseon tongsinsa
- MR: Chosŏn chungang t'ongsin; Chosŏn t'ongsinsa
- Website: kcna.kp

The Korean Central News Agency (KCNA; Korean: 조선중앙통신) is the state news agency of North Korea. The agency portrays the views of the North Korean government for both domestic and foreign consumption. It was established on December 5, 1946, and now features online coverage.

== Organization ==
KCNA works under the Korean Central Broadcasting Committee, through which it is ultimately controlled by the Workers' Party of Korea's Propaganda and Agitation Department. In December 1996, KCNA began publishing its news articles on the Internet with its web server located in Japan. Since October 2010, stories have been published on a new site, controlled from Pyongyang, and output has been significantly increased to include world stories with no specific link to North Korea as well as news from countries that have strong DPRK ties.

In addition to Korean, KCNA releases news translated into English, Russian, Chinese, Japanese, and Spanish. Access to its website, along with other North Korean news sites, has been blocked by South Korea since 2004 and can be accessed only through the government's authorization. As well as serving as a news agency, it also produces summaries of world news to North Korean officials and publishes the Korean Central Yearbook. It is also alleged to conduct clandestine intelligence collection.

Based in the capital Pyongyang, at 1 Potonggang-dong, Potonggang District, KCNA has bureaus in several municipalities. KCNA also has press exchange agreements with around 46 foreign news agencies, including South Korea's Yonhap. Its closest partners, however, are TASS and Xinhua News Agency. KCNA has correspondents and bureaus in six countries, including Russia and China. The correspondents are located in Russia, China, Cuba, Iran, India, and Egypt. KCNA also collaborates with Reuters and the Associated Press, the latter of which has a permanent bureau in Pyongyang. KCNA journalists have trained abroad with the BBC and Reuters. KCNA is a member of Organization of Asia-Pacific News Agencies since 1982. The agency employs 800 people.

According to its website, KCNA "speaks for the Workers' Party of Korea and the DPRK government". The agency has been described as the "official organ." In June 1964 on one of his first official activities, Kim Jong Il visited KCNA headquarters and said the agency should be "propagating the revolutionary ideology of the leader (Kim Il Sung) widely throughout the world." However, the agency is also said to offer a unique insight into the North Korean "mentality."

A talk given to officials at KCNA on June 12, 1964, outlines the function of the news agency:

In order to become a powerful ideological weapon of our Party, the Korean Central News Agency must provide a news service in accordance with the idea and intention of the great leader Comrade Kim Il Sung, establish Juche firmly in its work and fully embody the Party spirit, the working class spirit and the spirit of serving the people. It must pay serious attention to each word, to each dot of the writings it releases because they express the standpoint of our Party and the Government of our Republic.

Despite the agency's political motives, it has on occasion acknowledged food shortages in the country. The Ryongchon disaster was also reported in April 2004, after a delay of two days.

The Director General of KCNA is Kim Chang-gwang. KCNA has a sports team in the annual Paektusan Prize Games of Civil Servants.

== Recurring themes ==
=== Editorial practices ===
KCNA employs language, such as "traitors", "warmongers" or "human scum", for governments (especially those of South Korea and the United States), organizations and individuals who are deemed characteristic of those terms. In contrast, KCNA promotes the popularity of Kim Il Sung, Kim Jong Il, and Kim Jong Un, who are credited for their "outstanding wisdom", "unique abilities" or "noble virtue". KCNA articles emphasize the names of Kim Il Sung, Kim Jong Il and Kim Jong Un by enlarging their names to appear larger than the rest of the text.

Because of this, KCNA is often considered as a fake news website by many critics.

=== New Year editorials ===
As a tradition since 1996, KCNA, along with the three main state run newspapers in North Korea, publishes a joint New Year editorial that outlines the country's policies for the year. The editorials usually offer praise for the Songun policy, the government and leadership, and encourage the growth of the nation. They are also critical of the policies of South Korea, Japan, the United States and Western governments towards the country. On January 1, 2006, the agency sent out a joint-editorial from North Korea's state newspapers calling for the withdrawal of American troops from South Korea. While annual January 1 editorials are a tradition among the papers, that year's brought attention from Western media outlets, by calling for a "nationwide campaign for driving out the U.S. troops". The editorial made several references to Korean reunification. The 2009 editorial received similar attention, as criticism of United States policy was absent, and the admission of severe economic problems in the country. The editorial also made reference to denuclearisation on the Korean Peninsula, in what analysts claimed was a "hopeful" sign. This was echoed again in its 2010 editorial, which called for an end to hostilities with the United States and a nuclear free Korean Peninsula.

The 2011 joint editorial edition, aside from its calls for a denuclearized Korea and for a slowdown of tensions between the two Koreas, has for the first time, mentioned the rising light industries of the DPRK, given as a reason for an upcoming upsurge in the national economy in the new year and for the achievement of the Kangsong Taeguk national mission.

The 2012 joint editorial edition, the first under Kim Jong Un's leadership, started with a great tribute to Kim Jong Il and aside from recurring calls for improving inter-Korean relations and for the fulfillment of the October 4 Declaration of 2007, also called on the whole nation to give priority to do Kim Jong Il's 2012 mission of Strong and Prosperous Nation, continue his and his father Kim Il Sung's legacies to the entire country and the socialist cause, and to build up and encourage the various sectors that compose the nation to become contributors to national progress in all areas at all costs.

This practice ended in 2013 when Kim Jong Un delivered the first New Year speech on television in 19 years.

=== Censorship ===
Following the purge and execution of Jang Song-thaek, KCNA conducted its largest censorship operation on its webpage. Some 35,000 articles of Korean-language original reporting were deleted. Counting translations, a total of 100,000 articles were removed. Additionally, some articles were edited to omit Jang's name. Not all of the deleted articles mentioned Jang directly.

== See also ==
- Communications in North Korea
- Media of North Korea
- Yonhap News Agency, South Korean equivalent
