= Korean Central Television =

North Korean state television service

Korean Central Television 조선중앙텔레비죤
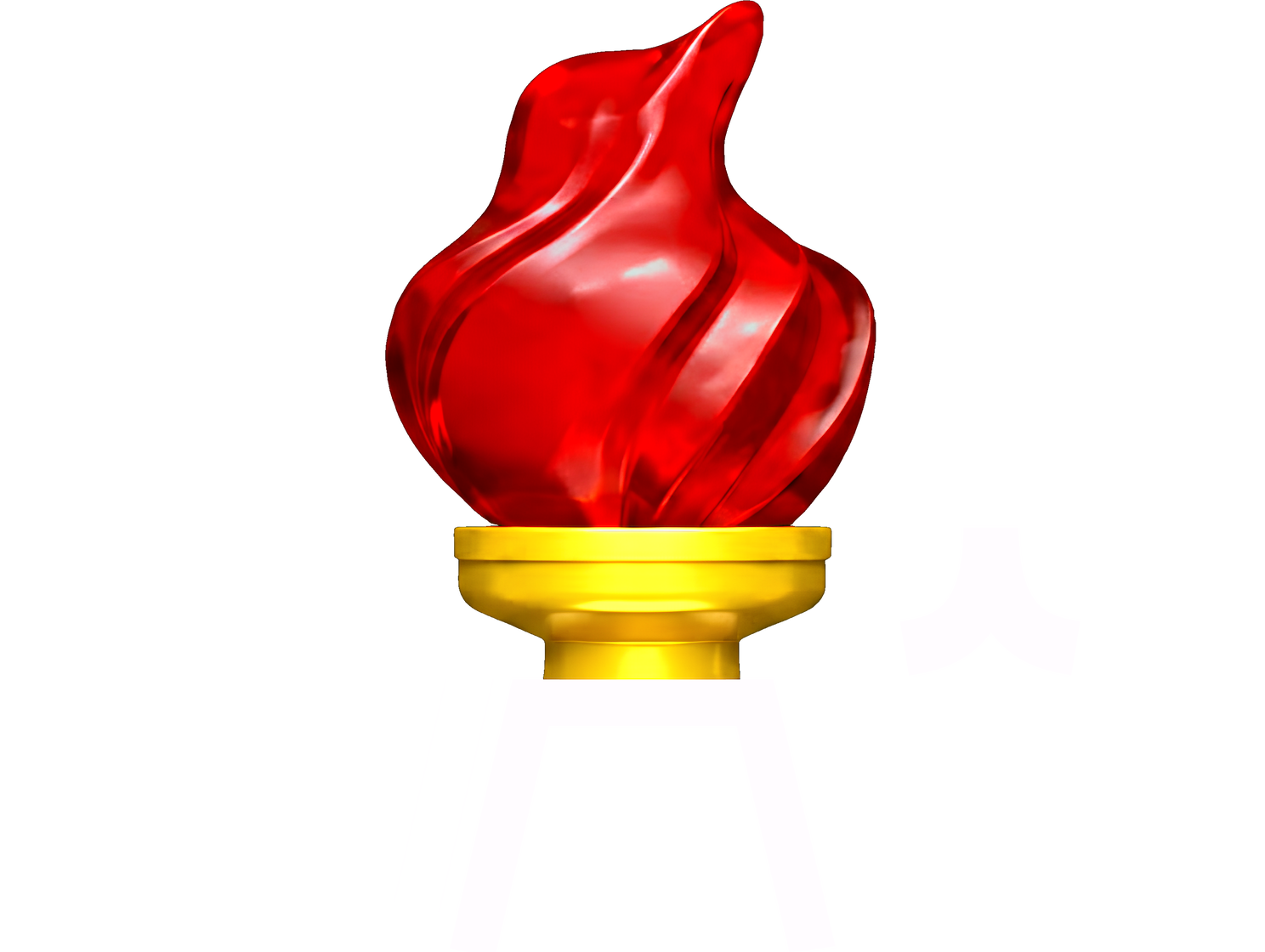

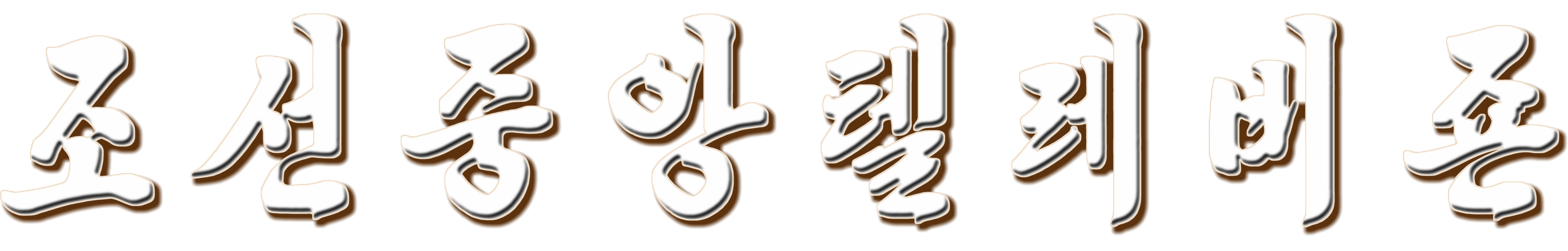
- Broadcast area: North Korea, parts of South Korea; Worldwide (via Satellite)
- Headquarters: Pyongyang, North Korea

Programming
- Picture format: 1080i 16:9 HDTV (downscaled to letterboxed 4:3 576i for the SDTV feed; HD not available on analogue)

Ownership
- Owner: Korean Central Broadcasting Committee
- Sister channels: Mansudae; Ryongnamsan; Athletic

History
- Launched: 3 March 1963; 63 years ago
- Former names: Pyongyang Television (1 September 1953 – 1961); Central Television Broadcasting System of the DPRK (1961 – 3 January 1973)

Availability

Terrestrial
- Analogue (PAL): Channel R12 (223.25 MHz in Pyongyang)
- Digital: DVB-T2
- Video on demand: Manbang
- Express-103: 3707 R 4975 (3/4)
- Express-AMU3: 11495 V 12620 (3/5)
- Intelsat 21: 4080 V 30000 (5/6)

Streaming media
- Intchoson: Live TV
- NK News: KCNA Watch
- Koryo Front: KCTV Live
- Juche TV: Korean Central Television
- Chollima Front / Koryo TV: Korean Central Television

Korean name
- Hangul: 조선중앙텔레비죤
- RR: Joseon jungang tellebijon
- MR: Chosŏn chungang t'ellebijon

Korean Central Television (KCTV; (Note: Also abbreviated KRT.) Korean: 조선중앙텔레비죤) is the oldest television channel in North Korea, operated by the Korean Central Broadcasting Committee, the country's sole broadcaster, which is state-owned. It is broadcast terrestrially via the Pyongyang TV Tower in Moranbong-guyok, Pyongyang, streamed via the government-run internet television service Manbang, and also uplinked via satellite. It officially launched in March 1963 and has been one of the primary channels that plays a leading role in the propaganda, ideological, and public opinion shaping efforts of the Workers' Party of Korea and the North Korean state.

== History ==
Originally known as the Central Television Broadcasting System of the DPRK (CTBS-DPRK), operations officially began on 3 March 1963, at 19:00 (7:00 pm) KST based in Pyongyang, broadcasting two hours between 19:00 until 21:00 KST on weekdays only, and then expanding to 4 and later 6 hours.

By 1968, the television network was still in the development stage.

The network carried live the whole proceedings of the 5th Workers' Party of Korea Congress held on 1 October 1970.

The CTBS would later be renamed Korean Central Television (KCTV) and was officially relaunched at 17:00 local time on 3 January 1973 (the first working day of 1973 in North Korea). The broadcasting hours were only on weekdays (workdays in North Korea) and closed on weekends and national holidays.

On 1 July 1974, KCTV presented its first colour telecast, in preparation for the 7th Asian Games in Tehran. After occasional broadcasts, KCTV began full-time colour broadcasts on 1 September 1977. The first broadcast received via satellite television broadcasts was the opening ceremony of the 1980 Summer Olympics.

KCTV started broadcasting on national holidays on 1 March 1981. On national holidays, the broadcasting time of each station is the same as weekends save for major ones. The channel was the official host broadcaster of the 1989 13th World Festival of Youth and Students.

In September 2012, China Central Television (CCTV) announced that it had recently donated 5 million yuan in new broadcasting equipment to KCTV, which was to be used to improve its programming and prepare for digital television.

By 2015, KCTV had been producing a growing number of programmes in the 16:9 aspect ratio, but its broadcast transmissions were still limited to a 4:3 standard definition format (with such programmes therefore being letterboxed). On 19 January 2015, KCTV began experimental high-definition transmissions via satellite, although only the live in-vision continuity at sign-on and sign-off was presented in HD. All other programming was presented in windowboxed standard definition. On 16 February 2015, a YouTube channel claiming to represent KCTV began posting several clips produced or mastered in HD, including archive footage of Kim Jong Il.

Native broadcasts in 16:9 widescreen with stereophonic sound started on 4 December 2017, with KCTV being one of the last state-run broadcasters to do so, albeit several years after other developed and even developing nations have done so.

In May 2024, the Chongryon-ran KCTV high-definition stream on Twitch, called "kctv_elufa" was terminated due to a violation of Twitch's Terms of Service. Later, Chongryon created another KCTV HD stream on Twitch, called "chuo_tv", but went offline due to change in satellite signal and eventually suspended in early January 2025.

== Programming ==
As of May 2022, KCTV broadcasts for around 13 hours daily, from 09:00 to around 22:40. Its sign-on sequence traditionally features the playing of the national anthem "National Anthem of the Democratic People's Republic of Korea", "Song of General Kim Il Sung" and "Song of General Kim Jong Il".

The station's output is dominated by propaganda programs. Initially, most of its programming focused on the history and achievements of the ruling Korean Workers' Party, the Korean People's Army (KPA), its leaders, and the Juche ideology. Locally produced feature films, children's programs, theater, and patriotic musical shows and filmed theatre shows are also shown on the networks. On national holidays, military parades, musical performances and movies, plus more special programs are shown on KCTV with similar programming on its three other sister channels.

Occasionally, dubbed and ideologically safe foreign films and television from allied Russia and China are aired on the network during times of warmer relations with the countries. The Star and The Seventh Bullet were both featured, as was a Chinese television program on the life of Mao Anying from 2010. By December 2018, KCTV's programmes had begun to gain a more contemporary feel as opposed to the strictly authoritarian style used before, with more programming showcasing the North Korean people. Programmes were observed to have featured more field reporting with visible anchors and production staff, younger hosts and personalities with modern attire, increased use of modern production techniques (such as aerial cameras), more modern graphics, and a looser and more energetic presentation. Kim Jong Un's New Year's address similarly saw the leader delivering the speech from an armchair in the Workers' Party headquarters, rather than from a podium in an assembly hall. Western analysts felt that these shifts in tone were intended to make the propaganda-based programmes more visually-appealing, and more in line with the production values of international broadcasters.

One of the few instances in which KCTV broadcasts live is during the annual New Year's Eve concert in Kim Il Sung Square, which was first televised in 2018. The concert is aired in two parts, including a roughly 50-minute show from 11 p.m., with the second half comprising the raising of the North Korean flag, the playing of the national anthem, and a fireworks display at midnight. In 2022, a reedited encore of the special on New Year's Day replaced a shot showing an initial failed attempt at unfurling the flag with a second take.

In May 2022, following the North's first reported cases of COVID-19 to the public, KCTV extended its broadcast day to begin at 9:00 a.m. daily. Previously, the channel began its broadcast day at 3:00 p.m., and only broadcast from 9:00 a.m. on Sundays, key national holidays, and every 1st, 11th and 21st of each month.

=== News operation ===
KCTV broadcasts daily news bulletins under the title Bodo (보도; lit. ''News' or 'Report''), which serve as one of the main propaganda organs of the Workers' Party of Korea. Their content strictly follows the party line, and coverage of the day-to-day activities of Kim Jong Un take precedence over all other headlines. Stories covering the country's military and economy are also featured. Weather reports aired on KCTV list Paektusan Secret Camp—which the country claims to be the birthplace of Kim Jong Il—behind only the capital of Pyongyang.

North Korean newscasts have long been known for being melodramatic. Newsreaders use one of five tones: a lofty, wavering one for praising the nation's leaders, an explanatory one for weather forecasts, a conversational one for uncontroversial stories, a hateful one for denouncing enemies of the regime and a mournful tone for announcing the death of a North Korean official or leader. Many North Korean journalists who have defected to the South have noted the contrasts with the more conversational South Korean broadcasting style. Long-time chief newsreader Ri Chun-hee is well known for her melodramatic style, and for typically wearing a traditional, pink Chosŏn-ot dress on-air. Ri retired as a full-time anchor in 2012, stating that she wanted to focus more on training a newer generation of broadcasters. She has continued to make infrequent on-air appearances to deliver top-level announcements from the government, such as missile tests, a broadcast discussing the Singapore Summit, and to announce the death of Kim Jong Il.

By September 2012, after receiving new equipment from Chinese state broadcaster CCTV, KCTV introduced a refreshed set for its bulletins, which featured a new anchor desk and a video backdrop. By December 2018, the bulletins had begun to employ contemporary presentation elements that had previously been avoided by KCTV, such as double boxes, as part of a larger shift in KCTV's programming. Experiments with further modernization occurred in March and May 2019, when economic reports used three-dimensional infographics (including 3D text overlaid into video footage), drone footage, and time-lapse video.

KCTV may return to air or remain on-air past its usual sign-off time during special occasions and breaking news situations. On 26 August 2020, KCTV broadcast advisories throughout the day on Typhoon Bavi, including updates from the State Hydro-Meteorological Administration. For what was believed to be the first time ever, KCTV remained on the air overnight, airing a block of films interspersed with the aforementioned updates. The following morning, KCTV broadcast extended coverage of the storm's arrival and impact, including live field reports from Pyongyang and Nampo—a contrast to the traditionally strict format of KCTV's bulletins. No other coverage of Typhoon Bavi was seen during KCTV's main news bulletins until 28 August, when a story focused on Kim Jong Un's assessment of damage by the typhoon. A few weeks later, KCTV aired similar coverage of Typhoon Maysak and Typhoon Haishen, building upon the format it had used for the Typhoon Bavi coverage.

=== Sports programming ===
KCTV has occasionally broadcast sporting events, including football, and other sports popular in the country. The amount of sports programming broadcast by KCTV steadily increased following the indefinite expansion of its broadcasting hours in 2022. The majority of sports broadcasts on KCTV are tape delayed and condensed into highlights for time. While it has aired coverage of international football competitions, the amount of delay between the broadcast and the original event can vary significantly. During the 2022 FIFA World Cup, KCTV broadcast nearly all matches with only one- or two-day delays, and the 2024 FIFA U-20 Women's World Cup final (where North Korea beat Japan) was broadcast in prime time the same day after it was played (originally at 7:00 a.m. PYT). On the other hand, Premier League and UEFA Champions League matches are often delayed by multiple months (if not longer), and are sometimes aired out of order.

The channel has sometimes been accused of obtaining its feeds of events through unauthorized means. KCTV obtained rights to the FIFA World Cup from 2010 through 2022, via a partnership with the Asia-Pacific Broadcasting Union covering North Korea and six other impoverished nations.

The Olympic Games have similarly been inconsistent; until 2024, KCTV usually sublicensed its coverage from SBS (who held the rights for the entire Korean Peninsula). Beginning in 2024, KCTV received its rights directly from the IOC after SBS ended this agreement. KCTV coverage of the 2020 Summer Olympics (which North Korea refused to send athletes to) began two days after the Games had ended, and it did not broadcast any coverage of the 2018 Winter Olympics in South Korea (despite North and South Korea entering as a unified team during the opening ceremonies, and fielding a unified team in women's ice hockey). KCTV was delayed in starting its 2024 Summer Olympics coverage until 4 August.

Its sports coverage has been subject to censorship for political reasons: matches involving teams with South Korean players have often been excluded from Premier League coverage, and its coverage of the 2018 FIFA World Cup excluded matches involving Japan. Coverage of the 2022 FIFA World Cup excluded a United States—Wales group stage match, and all South Korea matches before their Round of 16 loss to Brazil. Pitch-side advertising of South Korean corporations Kia and Hyundai was initially blurred out within the first few days before being left unedited. During a broadcast of a women's football match between North and South Korea at the 2022 Asian Games, a scoreboard graphic referred to South Korea as "puppets" (괴뢰).

== Availability ==
The station began its first colour broadcasts on 1 July 1974, using the SECAM system with 576i scanning lines, in line with most of the Eastern Bloc at that time. This was replaced with PAL sometime around the early-1990s or probably 1994. On the 54th anniversary of the Workers' Party of Korea in 1999, KCTV began a satellite television uplink via Thaicom 3. The station is available in Pyongyang, and in other major cities, including Chŏngjin, Hamhŭng, Haeju, Kaesŏng, Sinŭiju and Wŏnsan.

In 2012, KCTV began experimental digital terrestrial television broadcasts, using the European DVB-T2 standard (in contrast to South Korea, which uses the American ATSC standard; to Japan, which uses its indigenously developed ISDB-T standard; and to China, which uses its indigenously developed DTMB standard).

=== Outside North Korea ===
KCTV was broadcast free-to-air on Thaicom 5 until 25 February 2020, so with the appropriate equipment can be picked up in Southeast Asia, Australasia, Middle East, Africa and Europe. In April 2015, KCTV expanded its satellite broadcast coverage in America and Europe via Intelsat 21. On 18 January 2020, KCTV moved its satellite broadcast on ChinaSat 12 as the Thaicom 5 began experiencing technical difficulties around December 2019. On 29 June 2024, after Russian President Vladimir Putin's visit to North Korea, the satellite signal was moved to a Russian satellite, Ekspress-103, making government agencies and media in South Korea out of reception. As of 2 July 2024, the transmission quality from Ekspress-103 is poor, experiencing audio loss and bad images due to 5G frequency interference and limited coverage areas.

Since March 2019, KCTV's satellite signal has been relayed with BISS encryption by Koreasat 5A—a South Korean satellite owned by KT Corporation—to allow media outlets and journalists based in Seoul to continue monitoring the channel. The relay was established after 5G NR wireless service began to interfere with the C-band signal.

In January 2026, KCTV added another satellite feed on Ekspress-AMU3 with a wider coverage areas in Russia and East Asia using Ku-Band.

The daily KCTV news bulletin is also distributed online with Japanese subtitles through a Chongryon-supported website. In 2013, British broadcaster Channel 4 offered editions of the daily bulletin with English subtitles as part of its web series North Korea Uncovered.

South Korea-based American news outlet NK News provides a 4:3 feed, Internet-based webcast of KCTV as a part of their KCNA Watch tool. The daily news broadcasts and archived streams are also available as video-on-demand service.

== Test card ==
KCTV displays a test card in the roughly half-hour period before sign-on, with patriotic songs or classical musical works of the DPRK as background music. The EBU colour bars are shown when the broadcaster is otherwise off-air.

During the last minute before sign-on, a looping rendition of the first eight notes of the Song of General Kim Il Sung is always played.

Three test cards have been used:

- c. 1974 – mid-1990s: modified Philips PM5540/PM5544 hybrid colour testcard without side bars but with digital clock at bottom right. Towards the top of the testcard Chosŏn'gŭl characters for "Pyongyang" are written on either side of an image of the Chollima Statue emblazoned on a blue gradient background.
- mid-1990s – 3 December 2017: modified Philips PM5544 testcard with digital clock. Chosŏn'gŭl characters for "Pyongyang" are written on either side of a white Chollima emblazoned on a blue background on the top half of the testcard.
- 4 December 2017 – present: modified Philips PM5644 testcard with digital clock. Chosŏn'gŭl characters for "Korean Central Television" are depicted below an image of Mount Paektu's Heaven Lake emblazoned on a sky blue background situated on the top half of the testcard.
First test card, used until the mid-1990s. Off-air photo from October 1994.

Second test card, used from the mid-1990s until 3 December 2017

16:9 HD Test card in use since 4 December 2017

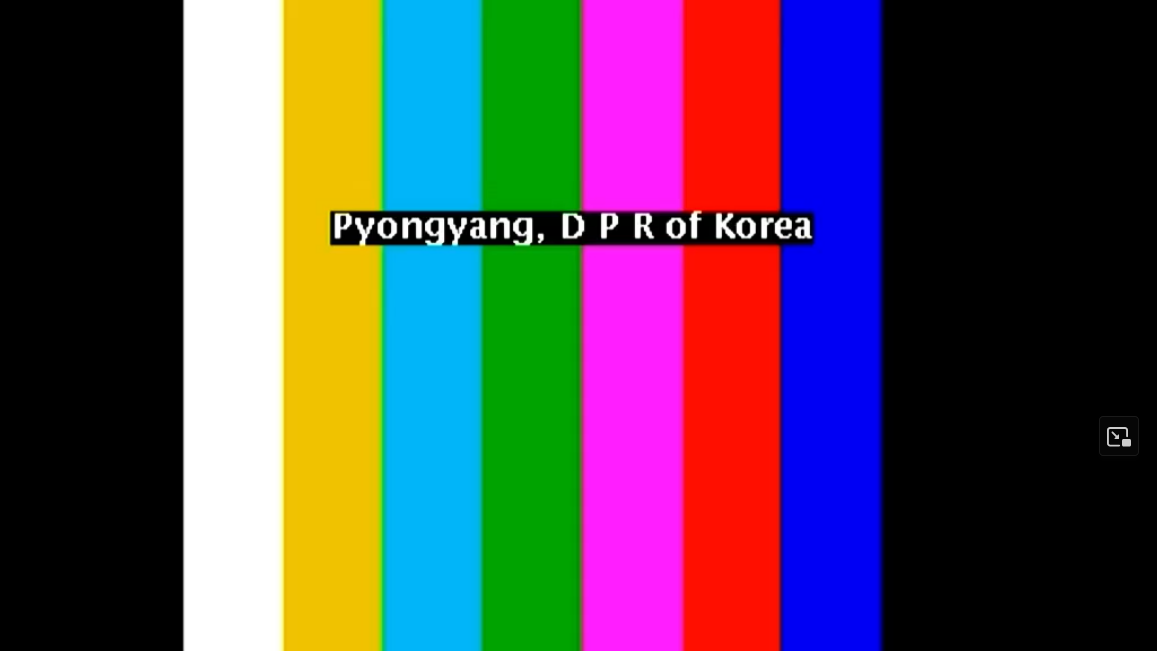
The test bars displayed on KCTV when no broadcast is happening.

== See also ==
- Censorship in North Korea
- China Central Television
- Korean Broadcasting System (equivalent in South Korea)
- List of North Korean television series
- Mansudae Television
- Manbang
- Media of North Korea
- Radio jamming in Korea
- Soviet Central Television
- Telecommunications in North Korea
- Television in North Korea
- Vietnam Television
