= Rimjingang =

North Korean news magazine

- Type: Periodical book/magazine
- Owner: Asia Press
- Publisher: ASIAPRESS Publishing
- Editor: Jiro Ishimaru
- Staff writers: approximately 8 journalists working under assumed names
- Founded: 2007; 19 years ago
- Headquarters: Sanukaito BLDG 303, 1-2-3; Ukita, Kita, OSAKA, #530-0021; Osaka, Japan
- Website: www.asiapress.org/rimjin-gang/

Rimjingang (or Rimjin-gang) is a North Korean magazine published by Asia Press based in Osaka, Japan. It aims to cover the lives of North Koreans via the usage of secret reporters to smuggle footage and other information to the rest of the world.

== About ==
Prior to the establishment of Rimjinggang, ASIAPRESS began operations in 1998, conducting interviews with defectors. In November 2007, Asia Press began publishing a magazine entitled Rimjin-gang: News from Inside North Korea in Korean and Japanese. It was started by a Japanese and Korean co-joint editorial group, a chief editor and Japanese journalist, Jiro Ishimaru, and a Korean representative editor, Choi Jin I, author and North Korean defector.

Rimjingang secretly operates with secret journalists and reporters within North Korea. The magazine aims to shed light on life inside the nation. The reporters, North Korean civilians and defectors who receive media training and recording equipment, are able to obtain things such as voice recordings, videos, and even official documents.

After the fourth issue of the Korean edition was released, several defectors launched their own magazine titiled Imjingang, with help from the US National Endowment for Democracy, though Rimjinggang declined funding to ensure journalistic integrity, according to Ishimaru.

One of the major reasons for the "divergence" was said to be that Imjingang intended to be rather a communication tool for defectors and North Koreans while Rimjingang aspires to be a project purely for journalistic activities and to foster journalists and journalism in North Korea. Since then, Choi Jin I has made Imjingang a completely independent magazine, which is no longer connected with Asia Press. Rimjingang, published in Japanese/English, in Japan and Imjingang published in South Korea are no longer related.

In 2010, the magazine published a video of a woman foraging for food in North Korea which received worldwide attention.

Currently, the Japanese edition of the magazine is published periodically. In October 2010, Rimjingang released its first English hardcover edition.

The name Rimjingang is also the North Korean name for the Imjin River, which crosses the demilitarized zone and flows into South Korea from the North. One of the magazine's North Korean journalists chose this name to symbolize sending the thoughts of the North Korean people to their brothers and sisters in the South.

== Staff ==
Chief Editor and journalist: Jiro Ishimaru.

All reporter names are pen names.

- Kim Dong-cheol
- Lee Song-hui
- Paek Hyang
- Shim Ui-chun
- Chang Jeong-gil
- Lee Jun
- Kae Myung-bin
- Ryu Kyung-won

== See also ==
- Chollima (magazine)
- Choson Sinbo
- Chongryon
