= Chongnyon Jonwi =

North Korean newspaper

- Type: Daily newspaper
- Publisher: Socialist Patriotic Youth League
- Editor-in-chief: Choe Sun-chol
- Launched: 17 January 1946; 80 years ago
- Language: Korean
- Country: North Korea
- OCLC number: 1083547640
- Website: youth.rep.kp

Korean name
- Hangul: 청년전위
- Hanja: 靑年前衛
- RR: Cheongnyeon jeonwi
- MR: Ch'ŏngnyŏn chŏnwi

Chongnyon Jonwi (Note: Also known as The Youth Sinmun and Chongnyon Chonwi.) (Korean: 청년전위; lit. 'youth vanguard') is a daily newspaper in North Korea. It is the official organ of the Central Committee of the Socialist Patriotic Youth League. It is one of the three most important newspapers in the country, the other two being Rodong Sinmun and Joson Inmingun. Chongnyon Jonwi is particularly known for jointly publishing New Year editorials with the two papers under the rule of Kim Jong Il. Most of its regular articles are commentary on the contents of Rodong Sinmun from a youth perspective. The editor-in-chief is Choe Sun-chol.

== History ==
The newspaper was first published on 17 January 1946. It was initially published under the title Chongnyon (Youth). It was renamed Minju Chongnyon on the occasion of the Second Congress of the Democratic Youth League of North Korea in September 1946. It got the name Rodong Chongnyon ('working youth') when the Democratic Youth League of Korea was reorganized into the League of Socialist Working Youth of Korea in May 1964. The current name, Chongnyon Jonwi was adopted when the youth league became the Kim Il Sung Socialist Youth League in January 1996. The league was renamed the Socialist Patriotic Youth League at its Tenth Congress held on 27–28 April 2021.

Chongnyon Jonwi received Order of the National Flag, First Class, for being published through the Korean War without missing an issue. It celebrated its 20,000th issue on 6 February 2017.

== Content ==
Chongnyon Jonwi is published daily and is a national newspaper. It is the organ of the Central Committee of the Socialist Patriotic Youth League. It carries travelogues, memoirs, essays, and other kinds of articles. Its mission is to instill the Juche ideology, loyalty to the Workers' Party of Korea (WPK) and leaders of North Korea in the country's youth. Most articles are commentary on articles in Rodong Sinmun from a youth perspective.

The newspaper is particularly known for being one of three newspapers that used to jointly publish New Year addresses under the rule of Kim Jong Il, who had broken with the tradition of delivering them to live audiences. The first such editorial was in 1995 and the last one in 2012. The other two newspapers were Rodong Sinmun, the organ of the WPK, and Joson Inmingun, the newspaper of the Korean People's Army (KPA). Because the WPK, KPA, and the youth league are the three most important organizations in the country, their newspapers are the three most influential papers, although according to Fyodor Tertitskiy of NK News: "objectively speaking, Chongnyon Chonwi is not nearly as significant as the other two publications".

== See also ==
- Media of North Korea
- List of newspapers in North Korea
