= List of newspapers in North Korea =

There are some 12 major newspapers published in North Korea and many other smaller ones. The most important newspapers are Rodong Sinmun, the organ of the Workers' Party of Korea, and Joson Inmingun, the newspaper of the Korean People's Army, followed by Chongnyon Jonwi, the Kimilsungist-Kimjongilist Youth League paper.

== List ==
=== General ===
- Cheyuk Sinmun (체육신문)
- Choldo Sinmun (철도신문)
- Chongnyon Jonwi, organ of the Central Committee of the Socialist Patriotic Youth League
- Joson Inmingun, official newspaper of the Korean People's Army
- Korean News Service (Chosun Tongsin, 조선통신)
- Minju Joson (also known as Minju Choson), official newspaper of the Cabinet of North Korea and the Standing Committee of the Supreme People's Assembly
- Nongup Kunroja (농업근로자)
- Rodong Chongnyon (로동청년)
- Rodong Sinmun, the official organ of the Central Committee of the Workers' Party of Korea. Considered a source of official North Korean viewpoints on many issues. In Korean and English.
- Rodongja Sinmun, organ of the Central Committee of the General Federation of Trade Unions of Korea
- Kyowŏn Sinmun (교원신문), official journal of the Ministry of Education and the teachers' union
- Kyoyuk Sinmun

=== Teen and children magazines ===
- Saenal (새날신문) For middle school students in the Socialist Patriotic Youth League.
- Sonyon Sinmun (소년신문) For children from 7 to 13.

=== City-provincial dailies ===
- Kaesong Sinmun
- Kangwon Ilbo
- Hambuk Ilbo
- Hamnam Ilbo
- Hwangbuk Ilbo
- Chaggang Ilbo
- Pyongbuk Ilbo
- Pyongnam Ilbo
- Pyongyang Sinmun, Workers' Party of Korea Pyongyang Municipal Committee

- The Pyongyang Times

- Ryanggang Ilbo
- Hwangnam Ilbo

=== Published abroad ===
- Choson Sinbo, official newspaper of the Chongryon
- Minjok Sibo
- Rimjingang (unofficial, private publication)

== See also ==
- List of magazines in North Korea
- Lists of newspapers in Korea
- Media of North Korea
- Lists of newspapers in Korea
- Newspapers in Korea
- List of newspapers in South Korea
