= Minju Joson =

North Korean state-run newspaper

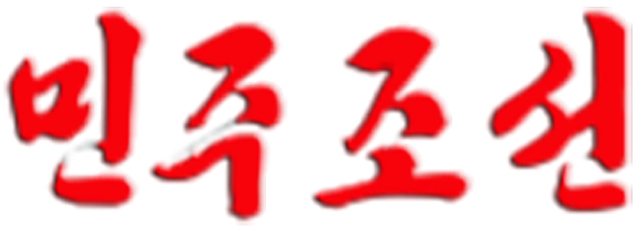

- Type: Daily newspaper
- Format: Broadsheet
- Publisher: Cabinet of North Korea, Presidium of the Supreme People's Assembly
- Editor-in-chief: Jong Ri-jong
- Founded: 1945
- Political alignment: Socialism, Juche, Songun, communism
- Headquarters: Pyongyang, North Korea
- Circulation: 200,000 (as of 1974)
- Website: www.minju.rep.kp/home/index/first/0/en

Korean name
- Hangul: 민주조선
- Hanja: 民主朝鮮
- RR: Minju Joseon
- MR: Minju Chosŏn

Minju Joson (also known as Minju Choson; Korean: 민주조선; lit. 'Democratic Korea') is a state-run North Korean government newspaper. It is published in Pyongyang. It was started in 1945. It is the principal newspaper of the Cabinet of North Korea and the Standing Committee of the Supreme People's Assembly.

== History ==
Minju Joson was founded in 1945. It began as Pyongyang Ilbo, the organ of the South Pyongan People's Committee. In October 1945, it changed its name to the current one, as it became the organ of the North Korean Provincial People's Committee, and took its current position in September 1948 when the Democratic People's Republic of Korea was officially established.

It was intended as a North Korean equivalent of the Soviet newspaper Izvestiya. In the Soviet Union, Izvestiya was more focused on economy than Pravda, which was more propagandist in content. This distinction was reflected in the North Korean papers Minju Joson and Rodong Sinmun. Since 1967 – the year of the Kapsan faction incident – the content of Minju Joson has been identical in tone to that of Rodong Sinmun.

The newspaper launched its website in 2019.

== Overview ==
Minju Joson is the official newspaper of the government of North Korea. Specifically, it is the official organ of both the Cabinet of North Korea and the Standing Committee of the Supreme People's Assembly. It is considered the second most authoritative newspaper in the country, after Rodong Sinmun. Unlike Rodong Sinmun, it handles more administrative matters, such as decisions and orders of the Cabinet, laws, regulations and policy issues. Content on both foreign and domestic policy, the economy, and culture is typical as well. The official mission of the newspaper is to "arm the workers of the people's governing bodies and the national economic bodies with the Great Leader's revolutionary thought and Juche ideology, and to greatly help the entire society in accomplishing Juche exploits by holding the workers firmly around the Party and the Great Leader and forcefully organizing and mobilizing them". Minju Choson is published in Pyongyang. Circulation as of 1974 is 200,000. The editor-in-chief is Jong Ri-jong.

=== New Year editorials ===
As a tradition since 1996, along with the two other main state run newspapers in North Korea: Korean Central News Agency and Rodong Sinmun, Minju Joson publishes a joint New Year editorial that outlines the country's policies for the year. The editorials usually offer praise for the Songun policy, the government and leadership, and encourage the growth of the nation. They are also critical of the policies of South Korea, Japan, the United States, and Western governments towards the country. On January 1, 2006, the agency sent out a joint-editorial from North Korea's state newspapers calling for the withdrawal of American troops from South Korea. While annual January 1 editorials are a tradition among the papers, that year's brought attention from Western media outlets, by calling for a "nationwide campaign for driving out the U.S. troops". The editorial made several references to Korean reunification. The 2009 editorial received similar attention, as criticism of United States policy was absent, and the admission of severe economic problems in the country. The editorial also made reference to denuclearisation on the Korean Peninsula, in what analysts claimed was a "hopeful" sign. This was echoed again in its 2010 editorial, which called for an end to hostilities with the United States and a nuclear free Korean Peninsula.

The 2011 joint editorial edition, aside from its calls for a denuclearized Korea and for a slowdown of tensions between the two Koreas, has for the first time, mentioned the rising light industries of the DPRK, given as a reason for an upcoming upsurge in the national economy in the new year and for the achievement of the Kangsong Taeguk national mission.

The 2012 joint editorial edition, the first under Kim Jong Un's leadership, started with a great tribute to Kim Jong Il and aside from recurring calls for improving inter-Korean relations and for the fulfillment of the October 4 Declaration of 2007, also called on the whole nation to give priority to do Kim Jong Il's 2012 mission of Strong and Prosperous Nation, continue his and his father Kim Il Sung's legacies to the entire country and the socialist cause, and to build up and encourage the various sectors that compose the nation to become contributors to national progress in all areas at all costs.

This practice ended in 2013 when Kim Jong Un delivered the first New Year speech on television in 19 years.

== See also ==
- List of newspapers in North Korea
- Telecommunications in North Korea
- Media of North Korea
