= Agrarian socialism =

Political ideology

Agrarian socialism is a political ideology that promotes social ownership of agrarian and agricultural production as opposed to private ownership. Agrarian socialism involves equally distributing agricultural land among collectivized peasant villages. Many agrarian socialist movements have tended to be rural (with an emphasis on decentralization and non-state forms of collective ownership), locally focused, and traditional. Governments and political parties seeking agrarian socialist policies have existed throughout the world, in regions including Europe, Asia, North America, Latin America, Africa, and Australia.

An example of an agrarian socialist party in Europe is the Russian Socialist Revolutionary Party (known as the SRs). The SRs were a prominent agrarian socialist political party in early 20th-century Russia during the Revolution. The SRs garnered much support among Russia's rural peasantry, who in particular supported their program of land socialization as opposed to the Bolshevik program of land nationalization—division of land among peasant tenants rather than collectivization in authoritarian state management.

Examples in Asia include the Chinese Communist Party (CCP) from the 1940s to the 1970s, along with the Workers' Party of Korea (WPK) and the Communist Party of Kampuchea (CPK) in the 1970s. Throughout the mid-20th century, the CCP pursued an agrarian socialist policy agenda in the People's Republic of China (PRC), the WPK pursued an agrarian socialist policy agenda as the Korean-style socialist rural construction" by sweeping land reforms in 1946 which was seized from landlords and distributed it to peasants, by the late 1950s, this was transitioned into a system of collective and state farms of the Democratic People's Republic of Korea. Inspired by the CCP's Great Leap Forward, from 1975 to 1979, the CPK and the Khmer Rouge implemented an extreme policy of forcibly relocating the entire Cambodian urban population to the countryside to become farmers, which led to a famine.

Examples of agrarian socialist parties in North America include the Socialist Party of Oklahoma and the Co-operative Commonwealth Federation (CCF) in Canada. In the United States, the Socialist Party of Oklahoma enjoyed local political significance in the first 20 years of the twentieth century as an agrarian socialist party. In 1944, the CCF formed North America's first democratic socialist government, in the Canadian province of Saskatchewan.

Examples in Latin America include agrarian socialist movements and sentiments that were developed in 19th-century Mexico by the indigenous Huastecan culture as part of its clash with Spanish imperialism. In the 20th century, examples include the Landless Workers' Movement of Brazil and the Communist Party of Cuba. Founded in 1984, the Landless Workers' Movement of Brazil was a socialist movement pursuing land reform in Brazil. Following the Cuban Revolution, the new Communist Party of Cuba pursued agrarian socialist policies, including the Agrarian Reform Law of 1959 and the Agrarian Reform Law of 1963.

== Theory and praxis ==
Agrarian socialism is a political ideology combining principles from agrarianism and socialism. Agrarian socialism pursues the collectivization of rural populations as opposed to agricultural policies that promote capitalistic farming. Agricultural collectivization seeks to contribute to the efficiency and productivity of large-scale farming while mitigating related issues of landlessness or overmigration to urban districts.

Agrarian socialism emphasizes the social control, ownership, and utilization of the means of production (such as farms) in a rural society. Additionally, principles like community, sharing, and local ownership are emphasized under agrarian socialism. For instance, in rural communities in post-Soviet Russia, "social organization of labor in the peasant household is based upon highly dense networks of mutual trust and interdependences" that diminished the need for manager-employee styles of labor. Nationalist ideology can also be seen coupled with agrarian socialist ideology, sometimes serving as the foundation for peasant-led revolutions. For instance, nationalist propaganda from the fledgling Chinese Communist Party during the Sino-Japanese War era "furthered the mobilization of the masses and helped determine the form this mobilization took."

== Europe ==
=== Diggers ===
The Diggers, a 17th-century group of religious and political dissidents in England, are associated with agrarian socialism.

=== Agrarian socialism in rural Hungary ===
The rise of Agrarian Socialism in Hungary began in the late 19th century in Viharsarok, Hungary. The socialist movement was sparked as a response to the exploitation of rural laborers and landless peasants who worked as farmers under feudalism in southeastern Hungary during the Habsburg Monarchy. In 1890, the Magyarországi Szociáldemokrata Párt (MSZDP) started to mobilize and organize agricultural workers, which resulted in rural laborers and poor peasant farmers protesting feudal landlords and local magistrates. The MSZDP advocated for an increase in the wages of farmers and the elimination of corvée.

The first uprising of the agrarian socialists began on May 1, 1891, in Orosháza and Békéscsaba. The uprising occurred after local authorities and the gendarmerie tried to prevent May Day celebrations among peasants and refused to recognize worker associations among peasants legally. The uprisings led to hundreds of rural workers and peasants being arrested. A key figure in the MSZDP was János Szántó Kovács, who advocated for land distribution among peasant farmers. On April 22, 1894, after Hungarian authorities confiscated socialist materials from workers' associations and arrested János Szántó Kovács, protesters stormed the town hall of Hódmezővásárhely which resulted in the military firing shots into a crowd of several thousand protesters. The violent reaction to the uprising garnered the attention of socialist philosopher Friedrich Engels. The uprising led to the Austria-Hungarian government declaring a state of siege, which resulted in mass arrests of socialist activists and brutal treatment of peasants in rural Hungary. The government continued its efforts to squelch the agrarian socialist movement, and in 1898, authorities imprisoned István Várkonyi, who edited an agrarian socialist journal Földmivelő. The jailing of Várkonyi came after a group of socialist women from Orosháza published an article detailing their demands for livable wages for agrarian women workers. As a result of the crackdown, the MSZDP distanced themselves from socialist activists, and the movement went underground, which gave birth to woman-led movements and groups that advocated for agrarian socialism, such as the Feminist Association.

On April 6, 1908, a second wave of agrarian socialism was birthed in Balmazújváros when a group of 400 peasants led by agrarian socialist leaders met to create the National Agricultural Party (Országos Földmívelő Párt). The party called for "equal suffrage and full freedom of the press, and the unrestricted right of assembly and association." The National Agricultural Party, in contrast to the MSZDP, openly advocated for women's suffrage and encouraged women to organize under the party's banner.

In 1918, the Communist Party of Hungary was founded, and shortly after, the Hungarian Soviet Republic was established, but it was short-lived. The National Peasant Party was formed in 1939 and advocated for land distribution among peasant agrarian workers.

Communist rule was revived in June 1948, and the Hungarian Working People's Party came into power, which resulted in the establishment of the Hungarian People's Republic. Starting in the late 1940s, Hungary adopted the Soviet Kolkhoz model, which was an agricultural collectivization system that originated in the Soviet Union, where peasants were compelled to fully merge their agricultural resources in an effort to increase agricultural production. The result of forced collectivization and the subsequent poor operation and management of these cooperatives resulted in food shortages in the 1950s. Following the 1956 Hungarian Revolution, Hungary abandoned the rigid Kolkhoz model, opting for a more flexible form of cooperatives where modestly sized individual holdings were allowed but the bulk of the land was jointly cultivated.

=== Russian populist tradition and Socialist Revolutionary Party ===
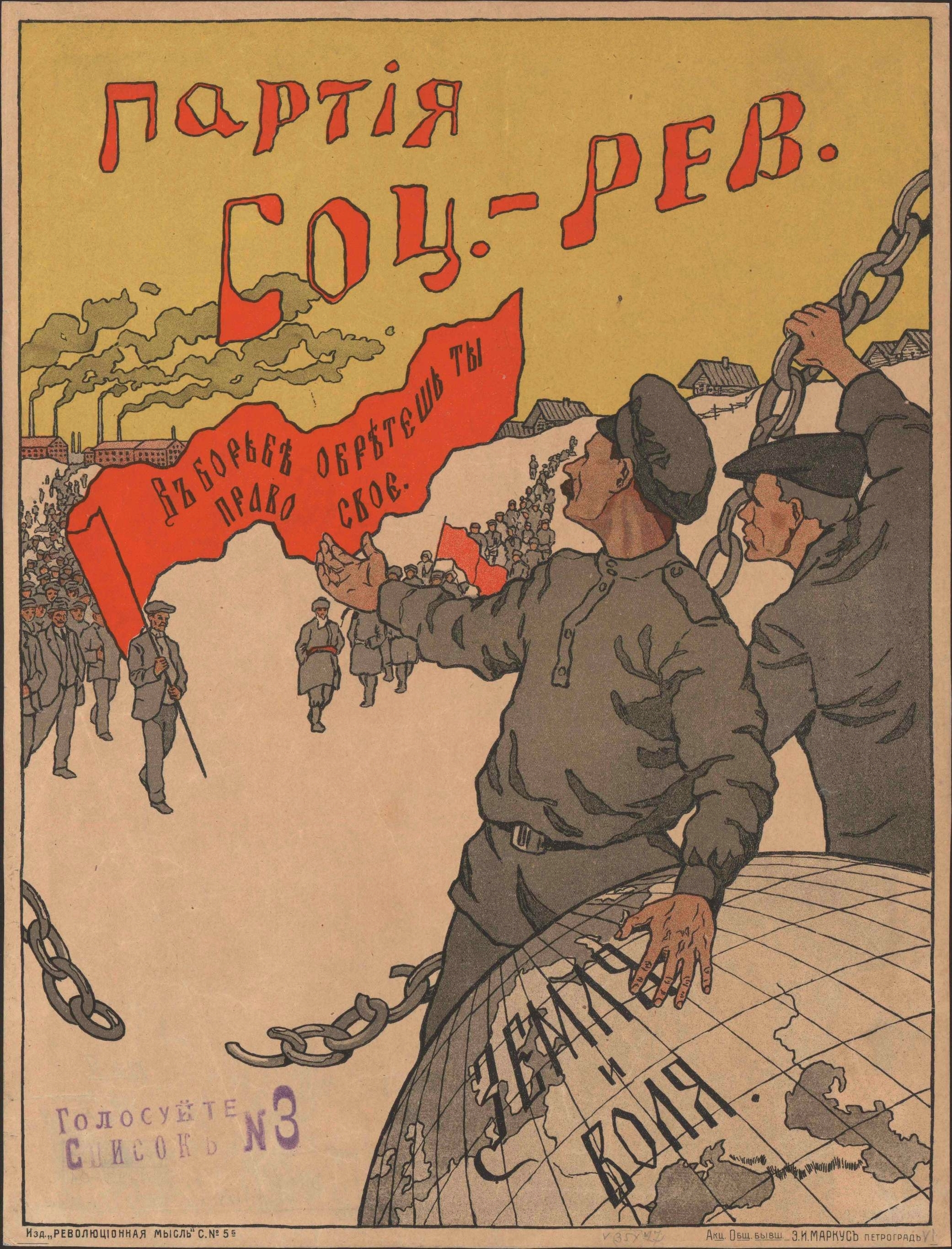
1917 Socialist–Revolutionary election poster: the caption in red reads партия соц-рев (in Russian), short for "Socialist Revolutionary Party". The banner bears the party's motto В борьбе обретешь ты право свое ("In struggle you take your rights"), and the globe bears the slogan земля и воля ("land and freedom"); they express the party's agrarian socialist ideology.

The Socialist Revolutionary Party was a major political party in early-20th-century Russia and a key player in the Russian Revolution. After the February Revolution of 1917 it shared power with liberal, social democratic, and other socialist parties within the Russian Provisional Government. In November 1917, it won a plurality of the national vote in Russia's first-ever democratic elections (to the Russian Constituent Assembly), but the soviets had gained control of the country, and the Bolsheviks maneuvered and eliminated the other parties within the soviets, including the Socialist Revolutionaries, and seized power. That sparked the Russian Civil War and the subsequent persecution.

The Socialist Revolutionaries' ideology was built upon the philosophical foundation of Russia's narodnik, a movement of the 1860s and the 1870s whose worldview was developed primarily by Alexander Herzen and Pyotr Lavrov. After a period of decline and marginalization in the 1880s, the narodnik school of thought about social change in Russia was revived and substantially modified by a group of writers and activists known as "neonarodniki" (neo-populists), particularly Viktor Chernov. Their main innovation was a renewed dialogue with Marxism and the integration of some of the key Marxist concepts into their thinking and practice. In that way, with the economic spurt and the industrialization in Russia in the 1890s, they attempted to broaden their appeal to attract the rapidly growing urban workforce to their traditionally peasant-oriented program.

The intention was to widen the concept of the "people" so that it encompassed all elements in the society that were opposed to the Tsarist regime.

The party's program was both socialist and democratic in nature and garnered much support among Russia's rural peasantry, which particularly supported the program of land-socialization, as opposed to the Bolsheviks' program of nationalization of the land. The Socialist Revolutionaries wanted the division of land for the peasant tenants, rather than the Bolsheviks' desire of collectivization under state management. The SR policy platform differed from that of the Russian Social Democratic Labour Parties, both Bolshevik and Menshevik, in that it was not officially Marxist though some of its ideologues considered themselves to be Marxists. The SRs believed that the "laboring peasantry" and the industrial proletariat were revolutionary classes in Russia, but the Bolsheviks considered the industrial proletariat to be exclusively revolutionary.

The Socialist Revolutionaries defined class membership in terms of ownership of the means of production, but Chernov and other theorists defined class membership in terms of extraction of surplus value from labor. Under the first definition, smallholding subsistence farmers who do not employ wage labor are, as owners of their land, would be members of the petty bourgeoisie. Under the second definition, they can be grouped with all who provide, rather than purchase, labor power and hence with the proletariat as part of the "laboring class". Chernov, nevertheless, considered the proletariat the "vanguard", with the peasantry forming the "main body" of the revolutionary army.

== Asia ==
=== Chinese Communist Party ===
In 1950, the Chinese Communist Party (CCP) enacted the Agrarian Reform Law, which confiscated the property of feudal landlords and redistributed it to the peasants. The CCP began implementing agricultural collectivization in 1952. From 1952 to 1958, agricultural production grew steadily. Economists then considered Chinese agricultural policy implementation to be a success relative to the Soviet Union's collectivization in 1929. However, China's agricultural output started to decrease significantly for three years in a row in 1959. The agricultural crisis led to 9 million deaths by the famine.

The specific cause of the agricultural crisis and resultant famine is debated, yet many sources attribute it to the Great Leap Forward. From 1958 to 1962, the Chinese Communist Party orchestrated a socioeconomic campaign, referred to as the Great Leap Forward, to rapidly develop the nation's agricultural and industrial economies.

=== Khmer Rouge ===
Once the Communist Party of Kampuchea (CPK/Khmer Rouge/Angkar) came to power in Cambodia in 1975, the government commenced the implementation of agrarian socialist policies in the nation's agricultural sector. The leadership outlined a policy agenda that included the establishment of agricultural cooperatives and collectivization. It referred to these policy priorities as the plan to realize a "Super Great Leap Forward" to an agrarian-socialist polity that was linguistically and ideologically inspired by Mao Zedong's Great Leap Forward in China. An emphasis on autarkic independence and self-reliance characterized the plan. To achieve complete autarky, CPK leadership asserted that the revolution would be sustained by agriculture, rice production in particular. The leadership sought to triple Cambodian rice production within a year. It evacuated urban residents en masse to rural agriculture-zones, which led to a large supply of agricultural labor. The agricultural reform policies coincided with a period of mass starvation and famine from 1975 to 1979.

The Cambodian Super Great Leap Forward differed from the Chinese Great Leap Forward in several key ways. The Chinese communes were intended to decentralize state power, but in Cambodia, all facets of labor and production on the communes were controlled by the state. Additionally, Cambodian policy held an underlying sentiment of anti-industrial and anti-urban ideology. Furthermore, urban centers managed to mitigate the total collapse of China's rural economy, but rural Cambodia did not have any urban centers from which to receive aid.

Dr. Kate Frieson, a researcher and policy analyst at Royal Roads University, considers those conditions to have led to the collapse of Cambodia's agricultural economy and to the resultant famine.

=== Juche ===
In February 1964, Kim Il Sung published "Theses on the Socialist Rural Question in Our Country" (also known as the Rural Theses), which became the backbone of North Korean agricultural policy of Juche and the Workers' Party of Korea (WPK) which aimed to abolish the differences between urban workers and rural peasants by modernizing agriculture and "socializing" the countryside, and sought to transform peasants into "socialist farmers" by increasing their ideological awareness and integrating them into state-managed collective farms to improve living standards within the socialist framework.

== North America ==
=== Socialist Party of Oklahoma ===
Relative to socialist parties elsewhere in the United States, the Socialist Party of Oklahoma enjoyed political significance in the first 20 years of the twentieth century. The party's electoral prominence peaked in the elections of 1914, when over 175 socialist candidates were elected to local and county positions, and six were elected to the Oklahoma state legislature. In the gubernatorial elections, socialist candidate Fred W. Holt received over 20 percent of the statewide vote. Virtually all of the Socialist Party's support derived from wheat-growing regions, and significant support came from farmers.

As a semi-autonomous affiliate of the Socialist Party of America (SPA), the Socialist Party of Oklahoma possessed a uniquely agrarian socialist agenda in contrast to other branches of the SPA. Many party leaders originated from prior agrarian movements, including the Farmers' Alliance and the Farmers' Union. The Socialist Party of Oklahoma advocated for agricultural collectivization and worker-owned farms and against the crop lien system, usury, and tenancy.

=== Co-operative Commonwealth Federation ===
The Co-operative Commonwealth Federation (CCF) was a democratic socialist political party founded in 1932 in Alberta, Canada, by a merger of socialist, agrarian, and labor organizations. The CCF held the realization of socialism as an explicit political goal.

Saskatchewan was primarily a rural and agricultural province throughout much of the twentieth century, with 58 percent of the labor force employed in agriculture in 1941. In 1944, the CCF formed North America's first democratic socialist government in an unprecedented electoral victory. CCF leadership soon implemented universal Medicare in Saskatchewan. Following this victory, the CCF government remained in power for twenty years.

== Latin America ==
=== Landless Rural Workers' Movement of Brazil ===
Founded in January 1984, the Landless Rural Workers' Movement of Brazil, was a socialist movement looking to challenge the status quo and promote the rights of labor over capital. Getting their start from the land gifted to them by the Catholic and Lutheran churches, members of this movement's first priority was to attain permanence on their settled land. Once settled, various MST branches were legitimized under the "social function" component of the Republic of Brazil's constitution, meaning that their contributions to society were recognized by the government. Next, the MST looked for a way to promote their socialist values. The answer came in the form of collectivization, taking inspiration from cooperatives found in Cuba. One MST leader stated "Only agricultural cooperation would allow settlements to best develop their production, introduce the division of labor, allow access to credit and new technologies...". However, they did not find immediate success as the rationalization of labor in these settlements sparked a great deal of tension between members. Factors such as the inability to become profitable and the paralleled behaviors between landlords and administrators of the cooperatives stagnated the progress of the MST. However, a reevaluation of the MST's ideals helped them refocus their struggle. First was the reintroduction of Campones tradition which placed the good of the family or community at center of decisions made on the farms. They also substituted large-scale production and rationalization of labor for subsistence farming which allowed for a less rigid organization of labor. The MST also partook in communal living, another significant element of Campones culture that encouraged families on the same cooperatives to live closely with one another. Finally, money earned by the cooperative was reinvested into the settlement to help sustain their farming technology, healthcare, and educational facilities amongst other things. The success of this rebrand created a number of opportunities for the MST. For example, in 1992 the Confederation of Agrarian Reform Cooperatives of Brazil provided the organization with support on a national level for things like education, technical training, and organizational support. The following year the MST established its first cooperative training course which became a part of the Technical Institute of Training and Research on Agrarian Reform. Furthermore, by 2008 "the MST had helped establish 161 cooperatives of various kinds, including 140 agro-industries". Additionally, the MST collaborated with the Brazilian government to create economic stability in their settlements through the Food Acquisition Program, which requires 30% of milk served to Brazilian public Schools to be bought from agrarian reform settlements.

=== Cuba ===
Leading up to the July 26 Revolution, both the Cuban government and Cuban citizens, especially those involved with agriculture, were heavily discontent with the sugar trade. Under this capitalist system, American enterprises claimed land previously belonging to small farmers for their own agricultural monopolies. Poverty, unemployment, and illiteracy grew tenfold, but Cubans did not have the means to stop it without causing severe harm to their economy.

However, the success of the revolution resulted in a resurgence of peasant-favoring and socialist ideals in Cuba. That was part of the anti-imperial and anti-colonial campaign promoted by the newly established Republic of Cuba. Under this new government, both the Agrarian Reform Law of 1959 and the Agrarian Reform Law of 1963 were enacted. These laws acted as a catalyst for social and economic reform as they allowed for land to be redistributed amongst thousands of peasants and abolished foreign ownership of rural lands. Previously corporate-owned farms were soon turned over to small family farmers or obtained by the state for their own mass food production purposes. Cooperative farms were another product from that period of reform, which allowed small farms to group together. That strengthened the voice and power of the agricultural population in Cuba when it came to the political sphere. The cooperatives were also highly effective, with over 75% becoming profitable in 1990, compared to 27% of state-owned farms claiming the same profitability.

As time progressed, more land was given to small farmers with state-sponsored farms in Cuba occupying 82% of cultivated land in 1988, but only 20% of cultivated land 2018.

=== Huasteco agrarian socialism ===
Indigenous Huastecan culture positioned community and local ownership above all else. Sharing resources and farming for the entire village was a normal occurrence in daily life. Spanish colonization and continued imperialization from other countries made that way of life fall under great duress. Huastecos lost the rights to their land and faced a caste system in which they were placed at the bottom. In the 19th century, creole and mestizo Mexican elites oppressed Huastecans by expropriating their land and privatizing it for their own political goals, which included building railroads and other capital-accumulating developments. The process of socialist radicalization for Huastecan peasants largely came from nationalist sentiments that arose after armed conflicts.

After fighting in the Mexican War of Independence and against the U.S. and the French during their respective invasions, the Huastecans developed a sense of identity as Mexican citizens. They further developed another facet of their identity from the oppression they faced from other Mexicans. A combination of radicalization efforts by anarchists from Mexico City and Socialist priests, for instance, Padre Mauricio Zavala, and oppression from the creole and mestizo elite helped Huasteacans develop their peasant class consciousness. Their national and class identities fused together creating the spirit of rebellion based on the principles of abolishing private property, reclaiming land rights, obtaining access to government representation, and other civil liberties. The Huasteco people spread their ideology using pamphlets, books, and flags. The final root of the peasant revolution of 1879 occurred in 1876, when General Porfirio Díaz enlisted the help of peasants to overthrow the current president Sebastian Lerdo de Tejada in exchange for the return of peasant land rights.

However, he betrayed them by choosing to implement liberal reforms, which strengthened private property laws and further persecuted Huastecans instead. Other peasant groups, for instance, the Morelo people of Mexico experienced the same fate as the Huastecans under the dictatorship rule of Diaz. The peasant groups combined their strengths and began a new socialist revolution that would abolish "any new revolutionary government that failed to address the needs of Mexico's impoverished and politically excluded rural population...".

== Oceania ==
=== Australia ===
Australia has a tradition of agrarian socialists holding seats in parliament. During the Second World War, cross-bencher Alexander Wilson held the balance of power in parliament in the Australian House of Representatives, who shifted his support between socialistic policies of Australian Labor Party and the agrarian policies of both Fadden's and Robert Menzies' governments.

The current longest serving member of the House of Representatives is self-described agrarian socialist Bob Katter. Katter's party platform largely calls for widespread government economic intervention and nationalisation, calling that the government must "put Australia’s interests first in respect to ownership of agricultural land, corporations, utilities, resources, and the means of production and ensure that foreign ownership or control of resources and agricultural production only occurs when it is in the national interest and does not undermine or threaten Australia’s independence and sovereignty" and that "Governments must ensure that a concentration of market power does not occur whether such concentration is monopolistic, oligopolistic or just unfairly out of balance." His son (and the leader of Katter's Australian Party) Robbie Katter also describes himself as an agrarian socialist.

== See also ==
- Great Leap Forward – 1958–1962 Chinese socioeconomic campaign
- Collectivization in the Soviet Union – Forced economic reforms of collective ownership of the means of production
- Agrarianism – Philosophy supporting rural society
- Collective farming – Type of agricultural organization
- Theses on the Socialist Rural Question in Our Country – Book by Kim Il Sung
- Pol Pot – Dictator of Cambodia from 1975 to 1979
- Eco-socialism – Ideology merging socialism with green politics
- Geolibertarianism – Political and economic ideology integrating libertarianism with Georgism
- Ho Chi Minh Thought – Political philosophy named after Ho Chi Minh
- Georgism – Economic philosophy centered on common ownership of land
- Land reform – Changing of laws, regulations, or customs regarding land ownership
- Maoism – Variety of Marxism–Leninism
- Localism (politics) – Political philosophy prioritizing local governance and community control
- Types of socialism – Variations of the economic philosophy
- Zapatismo – Armed movement identified with the ideas of Emiliano Zapata
