= Potato production in North Korea =

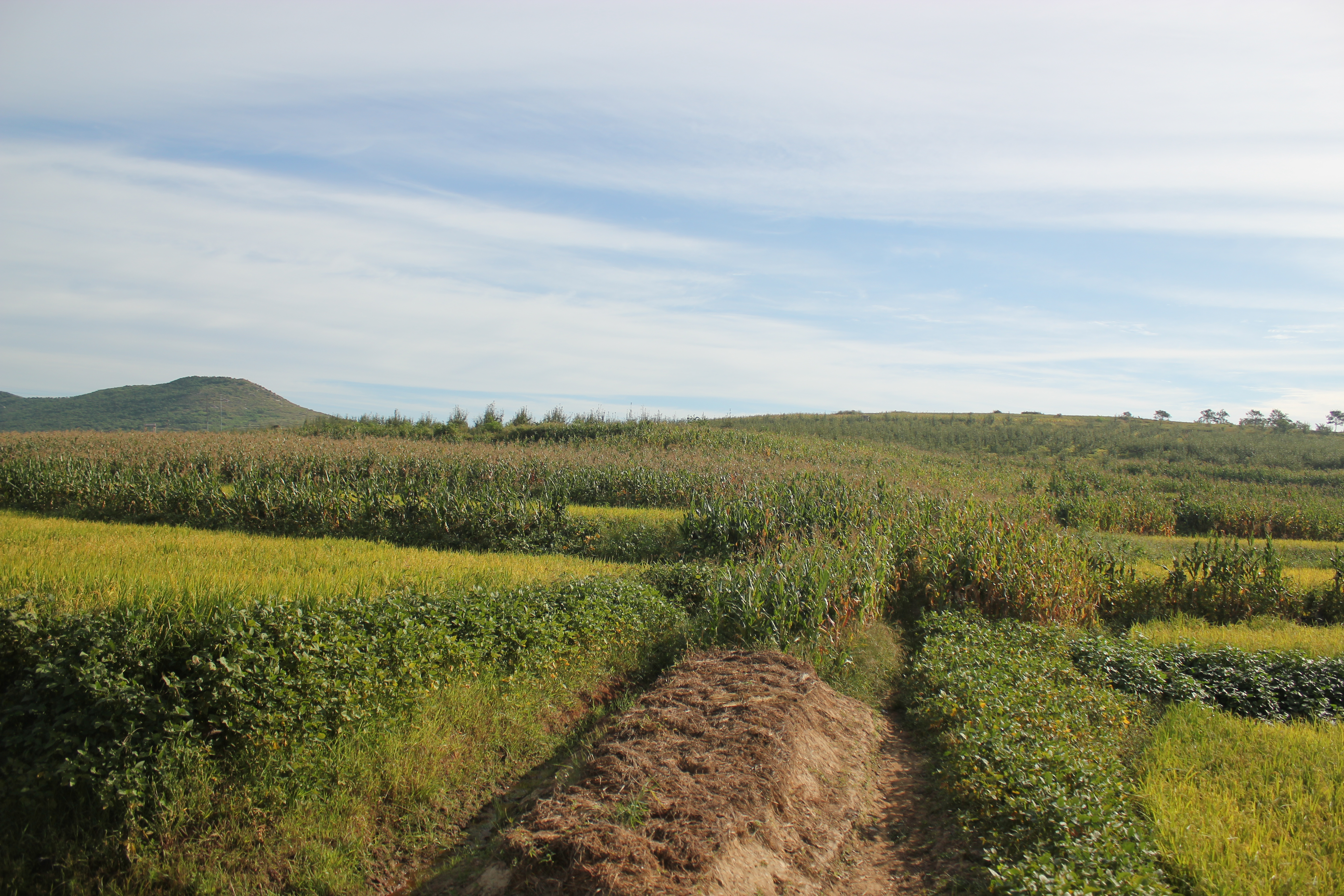
A potato mound near Nampo, North Korea.

In North Korea, the cultivation of potatoes is an important aspect to the livelihood of the country's population. The crop was introduced into the country in the early 1800s. Since the famine of the 1990s, a potato revolution has taken place. Over ten years, the area of potato cultivation in North Korea quadrupled to 200,000 hectares and per capita consumption increased from 16 to 60 kilograms (35 to 132 lb) per year.

== History ==
The cultivation of potatoes in North Korea is an early 19th-century development (probably introduced from China) which until the 1990s was affected by crop diseases, severe weather conditions, poor storage facilities, and lack of modernization resulting in lower yields. Insistence on agricultural Juche (self-reliance) for three decades is also cited as a reason for lower yields. During the occupation of Korea by Japan, from 1910 to 1945, potatoes were the staple crop in the country. During World War II in particular, the potato was the chief sustenance crop as rice was exported to Japan. In a potato poisoning incident between 1952 and 1953, at least 322 North Koreans were affected by the consumption of rotten potatoes. Of these, 52 people were hospitalized and 22 died. During his rule, Kim Il Sung ordered that farmers should focus on other crops, such as rice and maize.

A 1997 decree of the Supreme People's Assembly sought to increase the output of all crops, including potato. By then, however, much of the technical knowledge about potato farming had been lost and few people could make potato dishes. The "potato revolution" was initiated in 1999 by Kim Jong Il; potatoes were now viewed as a crop of high importance. North Korea was provided aid for potato production by a few humanitarian organisations.

Foreign aid organisations have helped with growing seed potatoes since the late 1990s, when the Swedish Pentecostal organisation Pingstmissionens Utvecklingssamarbete (PMU) began its program. The North Korean ambassador to Sweden had asked PMU for help in 1996. To inquiries about why he turned to a Christian organisation, he replied, "Christians usually help". The first hydroponics seed potato farm was established in Pyongyang in 2000, followed by three additional farms in other locations. Along with North Korea's Academy of Agricultural Sciences, World Vision, and the Asia Pacific Peace Committee, which was replaced by the Korea National Economic Cooperation Agency (KNECA), a fifth hydroponic seed potato farm was established in Taehongdan County in 2007, with expectations of boosting potato production quality by 50 percent. In the same year, researchers, Choe Kwi-nam, Han Won-Sik, and Min Gyong-nam visited Finland to study potato farming.

Potato production drew the attention of the government and the Food and Agriculture Organization (FAO) in 2008 with a four-year program plan. In includes infusion of $3.5 million to introduce modern methods developed by national and international research institutions. The program, based on climatic conditions of the potato growing regions, was a significant undertaking. Introduction of tested early-maturing varieties of Favorita and Zhongshu No 3 were planned to be introduced in the southern region and Zihuabai for the southern and northern highland regions which could increase production levels by about 50 per cent, and with this the expected total yield was 165,000 tonnes.

In addition, more land was to be brought under improved crop varieties. Some of the other innovations adopted are introducing seed certification standards, providing farmers with access to International Potato Center's gene bank, introduction of True Potato Seed (TPS) from botanical seed to reduce "carryover" crop diseases in seed tubers, and education of farmers in field schools. Apart from FAO, the Swiss Foundation for Development Assistance (Swissaid), has also supported activities related to improvement of potato seed quality, farming techniques to fight pests, proper use of fertilizers, better warehousing, and training farmers in potato seed production.

== Production ==
Potato, raw, with skin
Nutritional value per 100 g (3.5 oz)
- Energy: 321 kJ (77 kcal)
- Carbohydrates: 17.47 g
- Starch: 15.44 g
- Dietary fiber: 2.2 g
- Fat: 0.1 g
- Protein: 2 g
Vitamins and minerals
Vitamins	Quantity %DV^{†}
Thiamine (B1)	7% 0.08 mg
Riboflavin (B2)	2% 0.03 mg
Niacin (B3)	7% 1.05 mg
Pantothenic acid (B5)	6% 0.296 mg
Vitamin B6	17% 0.295 mg
Folate (B9)	4% 16 μg
Vitamin C	22% 19.7 mg
Vitamin E	0% 0.01 mg
Vitamin K	2% 1.9 μg
Minerals	Quantity %DV^{†}
Calcium	1% 12 mg
Iron	4% 0.78 mg
Magnesium	5% 23 mg
Manganese	7% 0.153 mg
Phosphorus	5% 57 mg
Potassium	14% 421 mg
Sodium	0% 6 mg
Zinc	3% 0.29 mg
- Other constituents: Quantity
- Water: 75 g
- Link to USDA Database entry
- ^{†}Percentages estimated using US recommendations for adults, except for potassium, which is estimated based on expert recommendation from the National Academies

Land brought under potato cultivation was 188,388 hectares (465,520 acres) in 2006, and the total production was 470,451 tonnes (463,021 long tons; 518,583 short tons) with average yield level of 9.3 tons/ha for the spring variety and 10.7 tons/ha for the summer crop. The introduction of Jangjin-6, Yolmaejo-saeng and its sub varieties showed a rise in yield in the range of 100 to 160 percent.

In the following year, the area planted in potatoes was 8,732,961 ha (as against 36,000 ha in 1960) and the production was 1,900,000 tonnes (1,900,000 long tons; 2,100,000 short tons) with an average yield level of 10 tons/ha. North Korea was in the 10th position in Asia in potato production in 2007. As part of the "Potato farming revolution", a low-input potato-rice cropping system (inter-cropping) was also introduced on account of its advantage with a short growing season; this resulted in a yield of 32 tonnes of potatoes and rice per hectare. Potato grows better than rice in North Korea, particularly in the mountainous regions.

== Nutrition ==
Grown in more than 125 countries including North Korea, potato is a root and tuber crop which has high nutritional value. It has protein, calcium and vitamin C. One potato of medium size contains 50 percent of the daily vitamin C needs of an adult. When boiled, its protein content is reported to be more than that of maize, with double the calcium content.

== Cuisine ==
Rice is North Korea's primary farm product. The potato was considered a second grade food item, but has become the main staple in rural areas, replacing rice. In its proliferation, Kim Jong Il is considered the champion crusader.

Kamja-guk, a potato soup, is a popular dish, made with potatoes and chicken broth or beef pieces. Other vegetables added to it are carrots, mushrooms, and onions spiced with pepper. Noodles made of potatoes (goksu) are also popular, along with other types made out of cereal grains. The noodles are eaten hot or cold, with broth. Potato cake made out of potato flour mixed with green onions, chives, and chilli pepper is also a popular dish. This mixture is fried and eaten, and is known as kamja puch’im. Another dish, kamja sujebi, is a potato flour dumpling that is used in soups.

== See also ==
- Agriculture in North Korea
- The Taehongdang Party Secretary
