= The Taehongdang Party Secretary =

North Korean film series

- Hangul: 대홍단책임비서
- RR: Daehongdan chaegim biseo
- MR: Taehongdan ch'aegim pisŏ
- Created by: 전영선
- Written by: 리춘구 (Ri Chung-gu), 리덕윤, 오현락
- Directed by: 박정수, 김춘송, 리주호, 렴성국
- Starring: Om Kil Song, Yu Kyeong Ae, Choe Ung-chol (replaced by Pak Jong-taek in the 2024 re-release)
- Country of origin: North Korea
- Original language: Korean
- No. of episodes: 6

Production
- Production company: Korean Art Film Studio

Original release
- Network: Korean Central Television
- Release: 1997 – 2001

The Taehongdang Party Secretary (Korean: 대홍단책임비서) is a six-part North Korean series, sometimes considered a film, which first ran from 1997 to 2001. Set during the North Korean famine of the 1990s, it is based on the real implementation of a potato farming project in Taehongdan County. The movie sought to portray potato farming as an inspiring act, part of an effort to increase the consumption of potatoes during a nationwide rice shortage.

In the movie, one lead character, played by Choe Ung-chol, initially refuses to lead a work group during freezing weather. However, his wife, daughter of the local party secretary, sets up a work group herself, and Choe's character is shamed into taking on his leadership role. Following the lead actor falling out of favour in the 2010s, the show was digitally edited to replace him with a new actor for a 2024 re-release.

== Plot ==
The show is set during the North Korean famine in the 1990s. It covers the running of a land reclamation project for potato farming in Taehongdan County in the country's northeast. One plotline follows Jang Myong U (played by Choe Ung-chol), who dates and then marries the Taehongdang Party Secretary's daughter. Despite being a strong individual who impresses the community, he does not want to lead a work group in freezing weather. After his wife forms an all-female work group, he is embarrassed into taking on work leadership. Other plotlines touched upon topics including food shortages, orphans, industrial accidents, and enthusiasm for government-mandated projects.

== Production and broadcast ==
The series (considered a six-part film) was produced by the Korean Art Film Studio. It consisted of six parts (이깔나무, 사나운 겨울, 겨울에 내리는 비, 대홍단의 철쭉, 방풍림, and 무지개 언덕), and was broadcast between 1997 and 2001. It was based on the real-life development of potato farming in Taehongdang County, and was filmed on location, reflecting the harshness of life in the area. The film starred popular actors who had appeared in previous North Korean productions. The many intersecting plot lines touched upon various impacts of the North Korean famine. Growing potatoes in Taehongdang County was depicted as a difficult but inspiring task, part of a propaganda effort to promote the eating of potatoes due to shortages of the traditional staple of rice in the country.

== Later releases ==
After a rerun in 2012, the show did not appear again for many years. This is likely related to the execution of Jang Song-thaek in 2013. Jang, the uncle of North Korean leader Kim Jong Un, is thought to have at one point been the de facto leader of the country. Following his execution, those considered affiliated with him were purged from political leadership. North Korean defectors had previously suggested that leading actor Choe had become unpopular with the government due to his affiliation with Jang. Choe had a reputation as a womaniser, and is rumoured to have a child related to Jang. A 2024 re-run which began on 2 January on Korean Central Television saw lead actor Choe Ung-chol digitally replaced by Pak Jong-taek throughout the series, although the rest of the show was unchanged. Jang had previously been similarly erased from official photographs. It is likely the filming of Pak's scenes took place some time after 2017.
