= Agriculture in Korea =

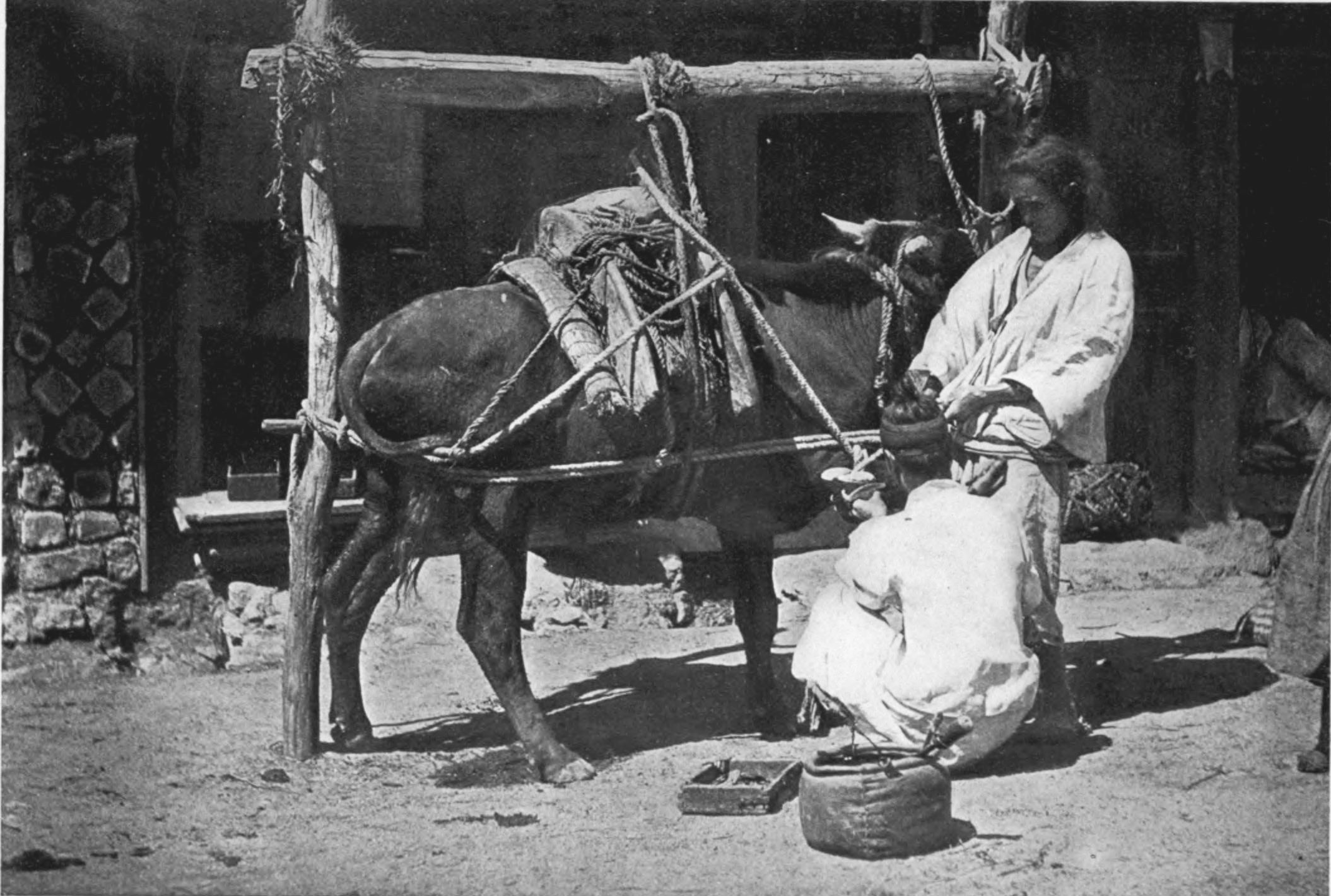
Shoeing a bull in the 1900s

Agriculture in Korea may refer to:

- Agriculture in South Korea
- Agriculture in North Korea
