= Pyŏngjin =

North Korean political term

- Hangul: 병진
- Hanja: 并進
- Lit.: parallel development
- RR: byeongjin
- MR: pyŏngjin

Pyŏngjin (Korean: 병진; Hanja: 并進; lit. 'parallel development') is a political term in North Korea. It originally refers to Kim Il Sung's policy in the 1960s to simultaneously develop the military and the economy; the term has been used in like manner under the direction of Kim Jong Un, grandson of Kim Il Sung.

The term pyŏngjin means "progress in tandem" or "move two things forward simultaneously" and refers to Kim Il Sung's stated policy, propagated in 1962, of developing both the military and the economy of North Korea together.

== Pyŏngjin under Kim Jong Un ==
In 2013, Kim Jong Un revived the policy with a focus on simultaneous development of the military and the economy.

== See also ==
- Economy of North Korea
- Korean People's Army
- North Korea and weapons of mass destruction
- Juche
- Songun
- Strong and Prosperous Nation
