= Union of Agricultural Workers of Korea =

Trade union in North Korea

- Predecessor: Farmers' Union of North Korea
- Founded: 31 January 1946; 80 years ago
- Headquarters: Pyongyang, North Korea
- Location: North Korea
- Members: 1.6 million
- Key people: Han Jong-hyok (chairman)(한종혁)
- Publication: Agricultural Working People of Korea

- Union of Agricultural Workers of Korea
- Hangul: 조선농업근로자동맹
- Hanja: 朝鮮農業勤勞者同盟
- RR: Joseon nongeop geulloja dongmaeng
- MR: Chosŏn nongŏp kŭlloja tongmaeng

Short name
- Hangul: 농근맹
- Hanja: 農勤盟
- RR: Nonggeunmaeng
- MR: Nonggŭnmaeng

The Union of Agricultural Workers of Korea (UAWK; or Korean Federation of Agricultural Workers) is a trade union and mass organization for agricultural workers in North Korea. It is one of the most important mass organizations in the country. UAWK was founded in 1946 and reformed in 1965 along the lines of North Korean leader Kim Il Sung's landmark Theses on the Socialist Rural Question in Our Country. The organization is directly controlled by the Central Committee of the ruling Workers' Party of Korea.

UAWK educates its 1.6 million members – farmers as well as office workers and manual laborers in the farming sector – on agricultural issues. Additionally, the organization educates on ideological matters, including Juche. The current chairman is Han Jong-hyok.

== History ==
The Union was founded as the Farmers' Union of North Korea(북조선농민동맹) on 31 January 1946. In February 1951, it was combined with its South Korean equivalent, the General Federation of Farmers' Unions(농민조합총연맹), to form the Farmers' Union of Korea(조선농민동맹). The organization adopted its current name on 25 March 1965. The reason behind the name change was a decision to renew the organization according to the guidelines set in Kim Il Sung's 1964 landmark work on agricultural policy, Theses on the Socialist Rural Question in Our Country.

== Organization ==
The organization is headquartered in the capital Pyongyang. It is directly controlled by the Central Committee of the ruling Workers' Party of Korea. UAWK was a member of the popular front Democratic Front for the Reunification of Korea until its dissolution in 2024. UAWK publishes the journal Agricultural Working People of Korea in Korean and English.

The current chairman of UAWK is Han Jong-hyok. His predecessors were Kim Chang-yop(김창엽) and Ri Myong-kil(리명길), who in turn was preceded by Seong San-sop(성산섭) from April 1998. Seong was preceded by Choe Seong-suk(최성숙), who became chairman in 1993.

== Membership ==
The Union's current membership of 1.6 million is down from three million in the 1980s and 2.6 million in the 1970s.

North Korean citizens are required to be members of at least one party-affiliated mass organization, one of which is the UAWK. Membership in the UWAK is open to farmers on collective farms between the ages of 31 and 65 (60 for women), as well as office workers, and manual laborers in the agricultural sector.

In addition to educating about agricultural matters, the organization provides education on ideology, including the Juche idea. The role of the organization can be characterized as "indoctrinating and controlling ... rather than [representing] workers."

== See also ==
- Agriculture in North Korea
- General Federation of Trade Unions of Korea
- Korean Democratic Women's League
