= Socialist Patriotic Youth League =

North Korean political youth organization

Socialist Patriotic Youth League 사회주의애국청년동맹
- Emblem

- Flag
- Chairman: Paek Un-chol
- Vice-Chairman: Kim Ju-hyok; Pak Myong-jin; Wang Chol-u; Kim Song-il; Ri Myong-hyok; Kim Song-il
- Founded: 17 January 1946; 80 years ago
- Headquarters: Pyongyang, North Korea
- Ideology: Socialism; Communism; Kimilsungism–Kimjongilism; Juche; North Korean nationalism; Before 2023: Korean nationalism
- Mother party: Workers' Party of Korea
- International affiliation: World Federation of Democratic Youth (WFDY)
- Newspaper: Chongnyon Jonwi
- Website: youth.rep.kp

- Socialist Patriotic Youth League
- Hangul: 사회주의애국청년동맹
- Hanja: 社會主義愛國靑年同盟
- RR: Sahoejuui aeguk cheongnyeon dongmaeng
- MR: Sahoejuŭi aeguk ch'ŏngnyŏn tongmaeng

The Socialist Patriotic Youth League is the main North Korean youth organization. Directly under the party Central Committee, it is the only mass organization expressly mentioned in the charter of the Workers' Party of Korea.

The organization, modeled after the Komsomol in the former Soviet Union, includes all North Koreans without party membership between the ages of 15 and 30, although married women who opt to become housewives are transferred to the Socialist Women's Union. Youth under 15 may join the Korean Children's Union. Officially, the guiding ideology of the organization is Kimilsungism–Kimjongilism.

== History ==
The League was founded on 17 January 1946 as the Democratic Youth League of North Korea. It became the youth wing of the Workers' Party of North Korea. Six months after its foundation in June 1946, the League joined the World Federation of Democratic Youth, establishing international relations with other Marxist–Leninist and anti-imperialist youth movements. In 1949, it was renamed the Democratic Youth League of Korea and in May 1964 renamed as the League of Socialist Working Youth of Korea. It assumed the name Kim Il Sung Socialist Youth League on its 50th anniversary in 1996.

Flag of the League of Socialist Working Youth of Korea (Sarochong)

The 8th congress of the youth league was held in February 1993, after a 12-year lapse since the 7th congress, held in 1981. The last conference was held on 12 July 2012, after ten years since the previous one, held on 21–22 March 2002. The 9th congress has been convened for January 2016, after 23 years since the previous one.

On 4 January 2007, in Pyongyang, Kim Song-chol, the First Secretary of the Pyongyang People's Committee of the KSYL gave a speech at a mass rally, with other high government officials, praising Songun Korea. During the speech, Kim Song-chol said that the country should bolster "death-defying corps" and create a "youth vanguard faithfully following the Party's Songun politics."

The 47th plenary meeting of the Central Committee of the KSYL was held, in Pyongyang, on 22 March 2012. At the meeting, former First Secretary Ri Yong-chol was relieved of his post due to his age and Jon Yong-nam was elected to the post. The current head of the league is Chairman of the Central Committee Pak Chol-min.

Recently, Choe Ryong-hae has been replacing military officials with KSYL members.

The Kim Il Sung Socialist Youth League was renamed as the Kimilsungist-Kimjongilist Youth League at its 9th Congress held on 27–28 August 2016. It was renamed as the Socialist Patriotic Youth League at its 10th Congress held on 27–28 April 2021, with the aims of reflecting its nature as a reserve force to socialist construction.

== Organization ==
The league's official newspaper is the Chongnyon Jonwi. It also has a sports team, Hwaebul Sports Club.

== See also ==
- Ernst Thälmann Pioneer Organisation
- Free German Youth
- Komsomol
- Communist Youth League of China
- Red Guards
- Vladimir Lenin All-Union Pioneer Organization
- Hwaebul Sports Club
