= Theses on the Socialist Rural Question in Our Country =

Book by Kim Il Sung

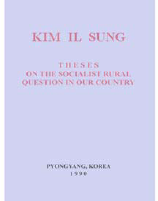
- Cover page of the English-language edition (1990)
- Author: Kim Il Sung
- Language: Korean
- Subject: Agriculture, Economic aspects, Korea (North); Korea (North), Rural conditions
- Published: 1964 (Korean ed.)
- Publisher: Pyongyang: Workers' Party of Korea Publishing House (Korean ed.); Pyongyang: Foreign Languages Publishing House (English ed.)
- Publication place: North Korea
- Pages: 64 (English ed.)
- OCLC: 150935485
- Dewey Decimal: 309.2/63/09519
- LC Class: HN730.6.A8 K513 1964

The peasant and agricultural questions will be solved finally only when the differences between town and country and the class distinction between the working class and the peasantry are abolished.

It is the sublime mission of the communists and the working class to achieve the final solution of the rural question and to lead the peasants to a communist society.

After the triumph of the socialist system, the Marxist-Leninist party should concentrate its efforts on the solution of the rural question in order to carry the revolution forward to final completion, in order to protect the interests of the entire working people thoroughly.

— Theses on the Socialist Rural Question in Our Country

Theses on the Socialist Rural Question in Our Country (Korean: 우리나라사회주의농촌문제에관한 테제), also known as the Rural Theses or Theses on the Socialist Agrarian Question in Our Country, is a 1964 treatise by Kim Il Sung, the first leader of North Korea. The work lays out the most influential statement on North Korean agricultural policy and its implementation transformed the country's agriculture from a traditional into a modern one. Crop yields were increased, but some environmental problems like deforestation ensued.

The Theses set out an application of Kim Il Sung's Three Revolutions Movement on agriculture. The three revolutions are: ideological, cultural, and technological advancements in the agricultural field. The piece has become iconic and has been referred to in other important texts including the leaders' works.

== Overview ==
The Theses laid out a framework for the first North Korean agricultural and environmental policy that was indigenous and ideological. Much of that policy has remained the same ever since. The Theses were a change of paradigm in the way North Korean agricultural policy was thought, and remains Kim's most referenced work on the subject. It is considered one of his most important works.

Robert Winstanley-Chesters calls it a "rare thing among North Korean texts, a piece of acutely coherent and systematic writing and thinking". This makes North Korean agricultural policy "knowable and accessible for analytical review", contrary to how media and academic narratives emphasizing the "opacity" of North Korea describe it.

It is one of only two writings of Kim Il Sung that is titled a "thesis", the other one being Theses on Socialist Education (1977). It is not known why Kim chose the qualifier; comparable works carry different titles.

In addition to standalone publications, the work is included in various collections of Kim Il Sung's works. It has been published, in addition to Korean, in English, French, Spanish, German, Arabic, and Danish.

== History ==
In August 1962, Kim Il Sung led a joint conference of local party and economic officials which convened in Changsong County, North Pyongan Province. It was out of this meeting that the Theses were conceived. The Theses were formally accepted by the eight plenum of the Central Committee of the Workers' Party of Korea on 25 February 1964.

== Three revolutions in agriculture ==
According to the Theses, agricultural development was to be done by applying Kim's Three Revolutions Movement: evoking ideological, cultural, and technological change. A cultural reform was the continuation of the consolidation of cooperatives into larger units that had been started earlier. The goal was to set up an "organic relationship" between state-owned industries and the cooperatives. Technological projects included the intensification of the use of chemicals and machinery. The Theses elevated agriculture in hierarchical status by putting the "peasantry over the urban working class, agriculture over industry and the rural over the urban" with the aim of eliminating the "distinctions between the working class and the peasantry". The Theses sought not only to increase agricultural production but also to socially transform the peasantry into "socialist farmers". While the working class would lead the peasants, industry and urban areas should aid them. The ultimate goal is to improve the livelihood of farmers.

The Theses also emphasized education. Agricultural research should be set up and that information conveyed to farmers. Instead of practices of modern agronomy such as established soil and hybridization research, Kim Il Sung meant a Juche type education: farmers should embody the "creativity" of the masses, "work around shortages", and solve all problems independently. In reality, however, farmers were often penalized for doing things in their own way.

Five key technological changed by the Theses were: the expansion of irrigation, the supply of electricity to the countryside, realignment of land to enable mechanization of agriculture, increase in the use of chemicals and fertilizers, and the reclamation of swamps and tidal lands.

== Impact on agricultural practices ==
The Theses rapidly and widely transformed North Korean agriculture from what used to be a traditional economy relying on crop rotation, organic fertilizer, and gravity-fed irrigation, to a modern one. A year after publication, North Korea's trade union for agricultural workers, the Farmers' Union of Korea, was reorganized along the lines of the Theses and renamed Union of Agricultural Workers of Korea. Kim had also emphasized the role of the County Cooperative Farm Management Committees.

The Theses had a great impact on irrigation systems in the country. Historically, gravity-fed irrigation had been used in Korea, but the Theses called for the industrialization of that system. Consequentially, an elaborate and extensive system of pumps, consisting of 3,505 pumps in the main trunk network by 1998, was built. The span of irrigated areas was expanded some 50-fold between the 1950s and 1990s. Massive upland areas became arable.

The reforms inspired by the Theses were a success. By around 1973, North Korea had sufficient rice production to meet basic needs. During the late-1980s, harvests reached record levels. Regardless of these advances, the policies inspired by the Theses were also the cause of future crises, notably erosion and forest degeneration.

More tractors were constructed as stipulated by the Theses, but due to military buildup, resources were not always available. Nevertheless, since 1972, the number of tractors at 30,000 was doubled in two years time. Agriculture became more capital intensive and less labor was required.

== Legacy in North Korean political texts ==
The Theses were extensively referenced in North Korean literature, and many foundational texts traced legitimacy back to it.

Kim Il Sung spoke about land management often, and in addition to the Theses he authored On Strengthening Land Management, Let Us Make Effective Use of Mountains and Rivers and For the Large-scale Reclamation of Tidelands on the topic. His son and successor Kim Jong Il, too, authored works on land management, as did his grandson and current leader Kim Jong Un. The latter, as his first published work, authored On Effecting a Drastic Turn in Land Management to Meet the Requirements for Building a Thriving Socialist Nation in 2012. In 2014, Kim Jong Un extensively revisited the original Theses in his New Year's address, as well as a text entitled Let Us Bring About Innovations in Agricultural Production under the Unfurled Banner of the Socialist Rural Theses published on 7 February.

A commemorative order, "30th Anniversary of the Publication of the Rural Theses", was established on 5 January 1994.

On 2 February 2026, Kim Jong Un publicly criticized the theses in a speech made at the Samkwang Livestock Farm, saying it was an impossible theory to implement in real life situations that only focused on study and revealed his plans to "modernize" the country's agriculture.

== See also ==
- Chinese Land Reform
- Agriculture in North Korea
- Green Revolution
- Kim Il Sung bibliography
- Potato production in North Korea
