= Rodongja Sinmun =

North Korean newspaper

- Publisher: General Federation of Trade Unions of Korea
- Editor-in-chief: Ri Song-ju (as of 2004) Unknown 1 (from October 2016 (during 7th congress) to 2021) Unknown 2 (from May 2021 (during 8th congress) to now)
- Founded: February 1948; 77 years ago
- Language: Korean
- City: Pyongyang
- Country: North Korea

- Rodongja Sinmun
- Chosŏn'gŭl: 로동자신문
- Hancha: 勞動者新聞
- Revised Romanization: rodongja Sinmun
- McCune–Reischauer: rodongja Sinmun

Rodongja Sinmun (Korean: 로동자신문; Hancha: 勞動者新聞, Workers' Newspaper) is the organ of the Central Committee of the General Federation of Trade Unions of Korea, the government-controlled federation of trade unions of North Korea. The organ is based in Pyongyang and its editor-in-chief was Ri Song-ju as of 2004.

The paper was founded in February 1948.

== See also ==
- List of newspapers in North Korea
- Telecommunications in North Korea
- Media of North Korea
