= General Federation of Trade Unions of Korea =

Trade union federation in North Korea

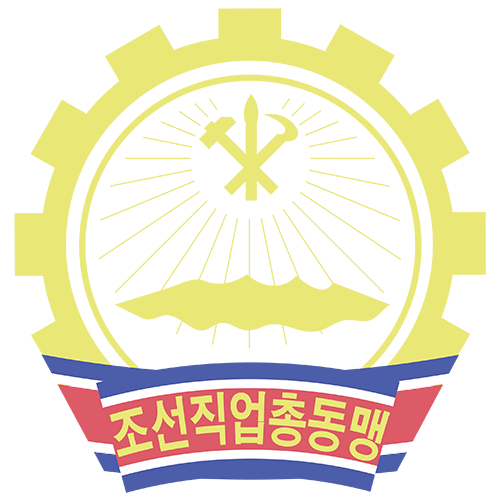
- Founded: 30 November 1945
- Location: North Korea
- Members: 1.6 million (2003)
- Ideology: Kimilsungism–Kimjongilism
- Key people: Ri Won-jong, Chairman
- Publication: Rodongja Sinmun
- Affiliations: DFRK, WFTU

Korean name
- Hangul: 조선직업총동맹
- Hanja: 朝鮮職業總同盟
- RR: Joseon jigeop chongdongmaeng
- MR: Chosŏn chigŏp ch'ongdongmaeng

The General Federation of Trade Unions of Korea (GFTUK; Korean: 조선직업총동맹; Hanja: 朝鮮職業總同盟) is the sole legal trade union federation in North Korea. GFTUK was formed on November 30, 1945, as the General Federation of Trade Unions of North Korea. In January 1951, it was reorganized and adopted its current name. The chairman of the central committee of GFTUK is Ri Won-jong.

== Organization ==
As of 2003, GFTUK has 1.6 million members, down from more than 2.4 million in the 1970s. During the Cold War, its membership was about half of the membership of the ruling Workers' Party of Korea (WPK). The ratio was comparatively low for a socialist country, evidencing the relatively unimportant role of unions in North Korea, which was one of the most industrialized socialist countries. Nevertheless, GFTUK was considered one of the most important mass organizations in the country. All workers of 30 years of age are required to be members of GFTUK if they are not members of WPK, the Union of Agricultural Workers of Korea, or the Socialist Women's Union of Korea.

Domestically, GFTUK was a member of the popular front Democratic Front for the Reunification of Korea until its dissolution in 2024. Internationally, the Federation is affiliated to the World Federation of Trade Unions, which it joined on May 2, 1947. The unions of GFTUK are affiliated to the various branch organizations of WFTU. The head of the international department of GFTUK is Im Jong-gi (임종기).

The website of the Korean Friendship Association states that "(The GFTUK) conducts ideological education to ensure its members fully understand the Juche idea and gets them to take part in socialist construction and the management of the socialist economy with the attitude befitting masters. It has its organizations in different branches of industry." However, the North Korea Handbook states that the GFTUK is not designed to serve its members but the WPK. GFTUK is directly controlled by the Central Committee of the WPK.

Rodongja Sinmun is the organ of the Central Committee of GFTUK. Officially, the guiding ideology of the organization is Kimilsungism–Kimjongilism.

== Former chairmen ==
- Ryom Sun-gil (렴순길) (2000s)
- Ju Yong-gil (주용길) (2010s)
- Ju Yong-guk (2010s)

== List of unions affiliated to GFTUK ==
The following trade unions, representing nine different industries, comprise GFTUK:

- Trade Union of Metal and Engineering Industries of Korea
- Trade Union of Mining and Power Industries of Korea
- Trade Union of Light and Chemical Industries of Korea
- Trade Union of Public Employees and Service Workers of Korea
- Trade Union of Construction and Forestry Workers of Korea
- Trade Union of Educational and Cultural Workers of Korea
- Trade Union of Transport and Fisheries Workers of Korea

== See also ==
- Trade unions in South Korea
