= Agriculture in North Korea =

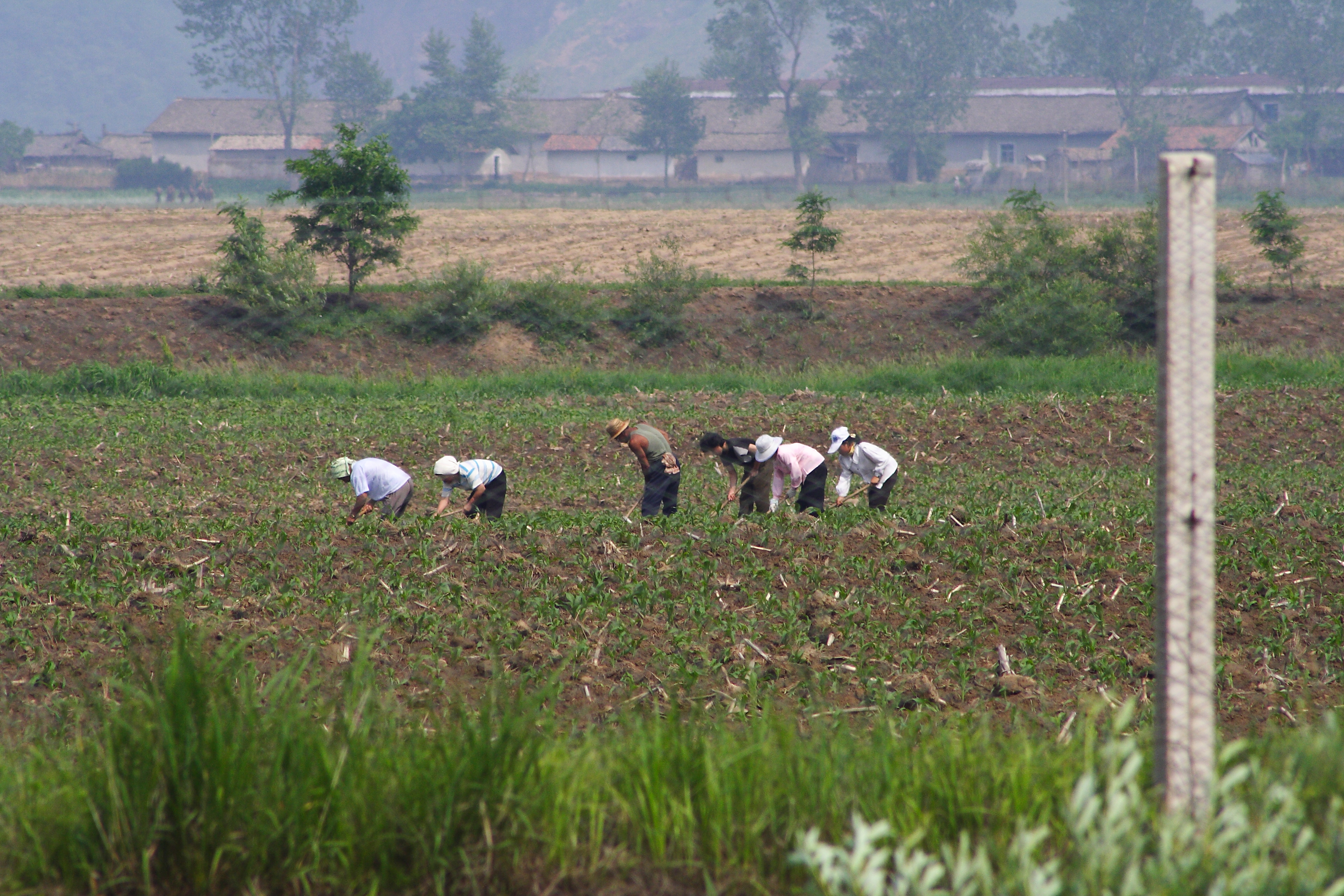
North Korean farmers in a field.

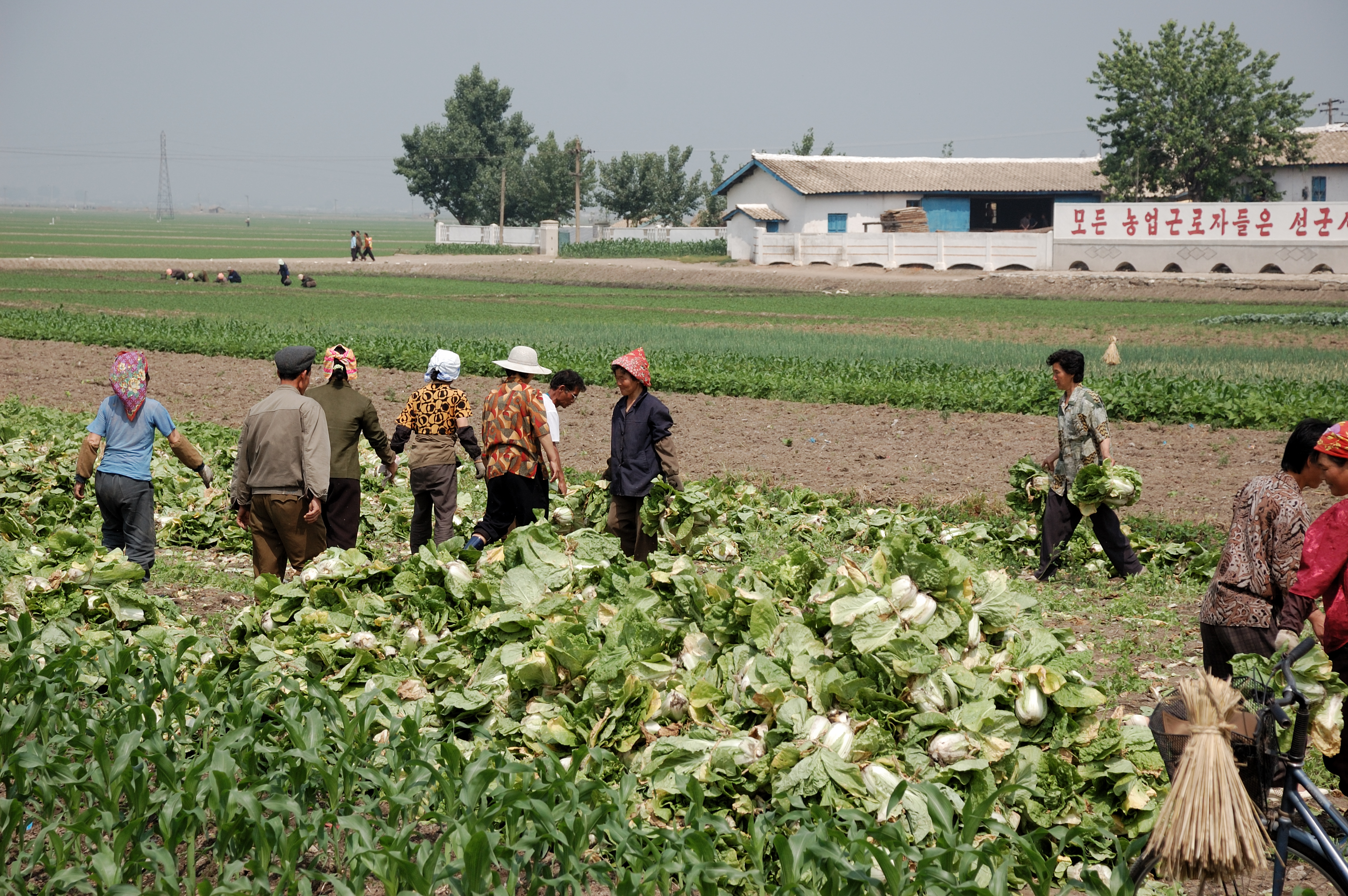
A North Korean farm, 2008.

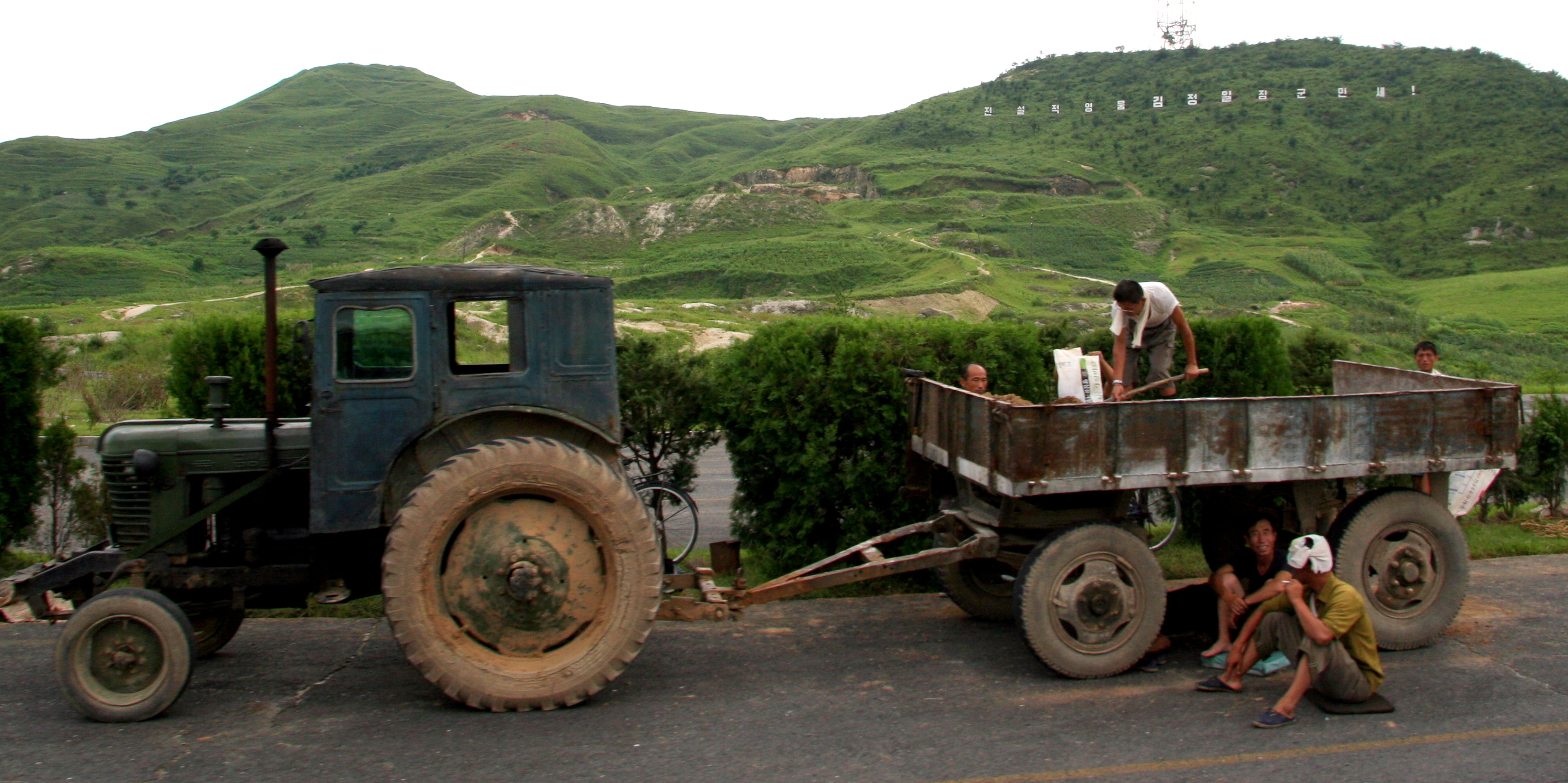
A tractor in North Korea.

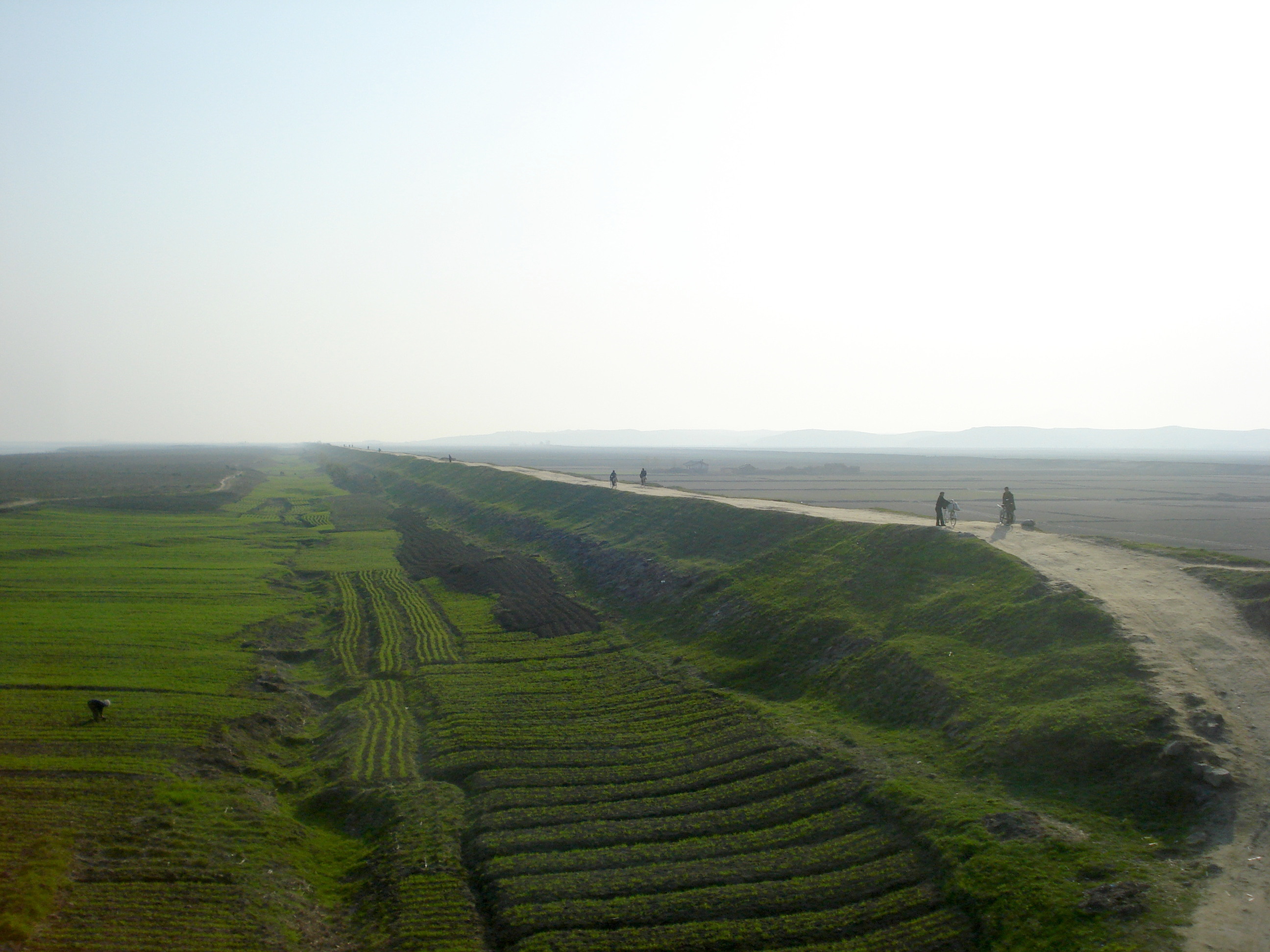
Crops growing in North Pyongan, DPRK.

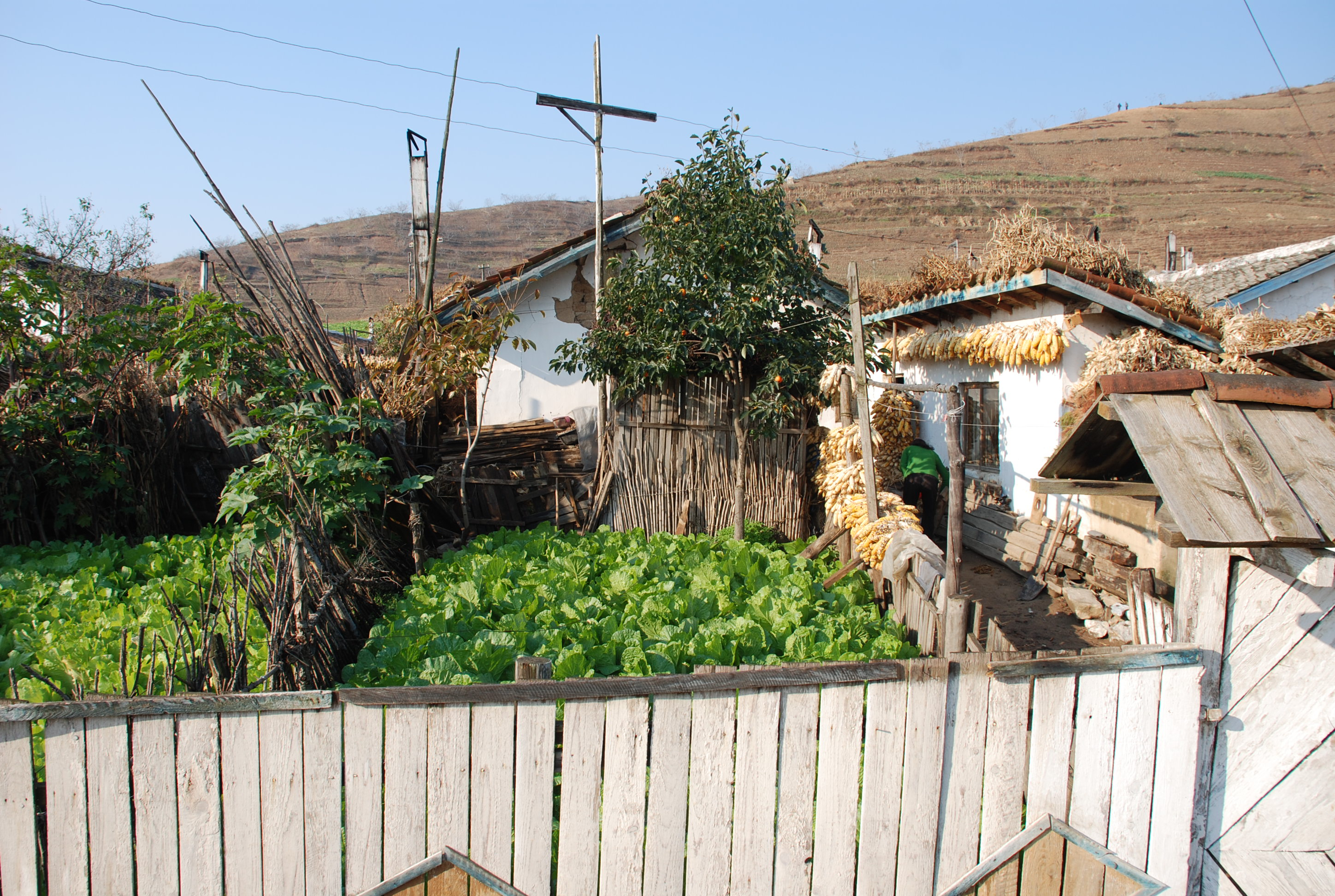
Food grown in the private gardens surrounding people's homes.

Farming in North Korea is concentrated in the flatlands of the four west coast provinces, where a longer growing season, level land, adequate rainfall, and good irrigated soil permit the most intensive cultivation of crops. A narrow strip of similarly fertile land runs through the eastern seaboard Hamgyŏng provinces and Kangwŏn Province.

The interior provinces of Chagang and Ryanggang are too mountainous, cold, and dry to allow much farming. The mountains contain the bulk of North Korea's forest reserves while the foothills within and between the major agricultural regions provide lands for livestock grazing and fruit tree cultivation.

Major crops including rice fields and non-paddy fields by Kim Il Sung since 1947 as part of an agrarian socialist and classless society. 23.4% of North Korea's forced labor camps and revolutionary total control zones worked in agriculture in 2012.

== Farming conditions ==
North Korea's sparse agricultural resources restrict agricultural production. Climate, terrain, and soil conditions are not particularly favorable for farming, with a relatively short cropping season. Only about 17% of the total landmass, or approximately 20,000 km^{2}, is arable, of which 14,000 km^{2} is well suited for cereal cultivation; the major portion of the country is rugged mountain terrain. By comparison, 22% of land in South Korea is arable, with 65% of it dedicated to growing grain.

The weather varies markedly according to elevation, and lack of precipitation, along with infertile soil, makes land at elevations higher than 400 meters unsuitable for purposes other than grazing. Precipitation is geographically and seasonally irregular, and in most parts of the country as much as half the annual rainfall occurs in the three summer months. This pattern favors the cultivation of paddy rice in warmer regions that are outfitted with irrigation and flood control networks. Rice yields are 5.3 tonnes per hectare, close to international norms.

== Agricultural products ==
=== Rice ===
Rice is, along with maize, North Korea's primary farm product.

=== Maize ===
Maize is, along with rice, a staple food in North Korea. It is predominantly cultivated in the southwestern flatlands of the country.

=== Potatoes ===
Potatoes have become an important food source in North Korea. After the 1990s famine, a "potato revolution" has taken place. Between 1998 and 2008 the area of potato cultivation in North Korea quadrupled to 200,000 ha and per capita consumption increased from 16 to 60 kilograms (35 to 132 lb) per year.

The potato was considered a second grade food item, but has become the main staple in rural areas, replacing rice.

=== Greenhouse products ===
Since 2014 many greenhouses have been built, funded by the new semi-private traders in co-operation with farmers, growing soft fruits such as strawberries and melons. The traders arrange distribution and sale in the Jangmadang markets in cities.

=== Poultry ===
As of 2021, there are nearly 30 large chicken farms across the country.

== Food distribution system ==
Since the 1950s, a majority of North Koreans have received their food through the Public Distribution System (PDS). The PDS requires farmers in agricultural regions to hand over a portion of their production to the government and then reallocates the surplus to urban regions, which cannot grow their own foods. About 70% of the North Korean population, including the entire urban population, receives food through this government-run system including prisons and re-education camps.

Before the floods, recipients were generally allotted 600–700 grams per day while high officials, military men, heavy laborers, and public security personnel were allotted slightly larger portions of 700–800 grams per day. As of 2013, the target average distribution was 573 grams of cereal equivalent per person per day, but varied according to age, occupation, and whether rations are received elsewhere (such as rice and gruel).

Decreases in production affected the quantity of food available through the public distribution system. Shortages were compounded when the North Korean government imposed further restrictions on collective farmers. When farmers, who had never been covered by the PDS, were mandated by the government to reduce their own food allotments from 167 kilograms to 107 kilograms of grain per person each year, they responded by withholding portions of the required amount of grain. Famine refugees reported that the government decreased PDS rations to 150 grams in 1994 and to as low as 30 grams by 1997.

The PDS failed to provide any food from April to August 1998 (the “lean” season) as well as from March to June 1999. In January 1998, the North Korean government publicly announced that the PDS would no longer distribute rations and that families needed to somehow procure their own food supplies. By 2005 the PDS was only supplying households with approximately one half of an absolute minimum caloric need. By 2008 the system had significantly recovered, and from 2009 to 2013 daily per person rations averaged at 400 grams per day for much of the year, though in 2011 it dropped to 200 grams per day from May to September.

It is estimated that in the early 2000s, the average North Korean family drew some 80% of its income from small businesses that were technically illegal (though unenforced) in North Korea. In 2002, and in 2010, private markets were progressively legalized. As of 2013, urban and farmer markets were held every 10 days, and most urban residents lived within 2 km of a market, with markets having an increasing role in obtaining food.

== Agricultural policy ==
Since self-sufficiency remains an important pillar of North Korean ideology, self-sufficiency in food production is deemed a worthy goal. Another aim of government policies—to reduce the "gap" between urban and rural living standards—requires continued investment in the agricultural sector. Finally, as in most countries, changes in the supply or prices of foodstuffs probably are the most conspicuous and sensitive economic concerns for the average citizen. The stability of the country depends on steady, if not rapid, increases in the availability of food items at reasonable prices. In the early 1990s, there were severe food shortages.

The most far-reaching statement on agricultural policy is embodied in Kim Il-sung's 1964 Theses on the Socialist Agrarian Question in Our Country, which underscores the government's concern for agricultural development. Kim emphasized technological and educational progress in the countryside as well as collective forms of ownership and management.

Since 2005, efforts have been made to increase the availability of protein sources, primarily pigs, poultry, rabbits and fish farms and Fisheries.

== Agricultural history ==
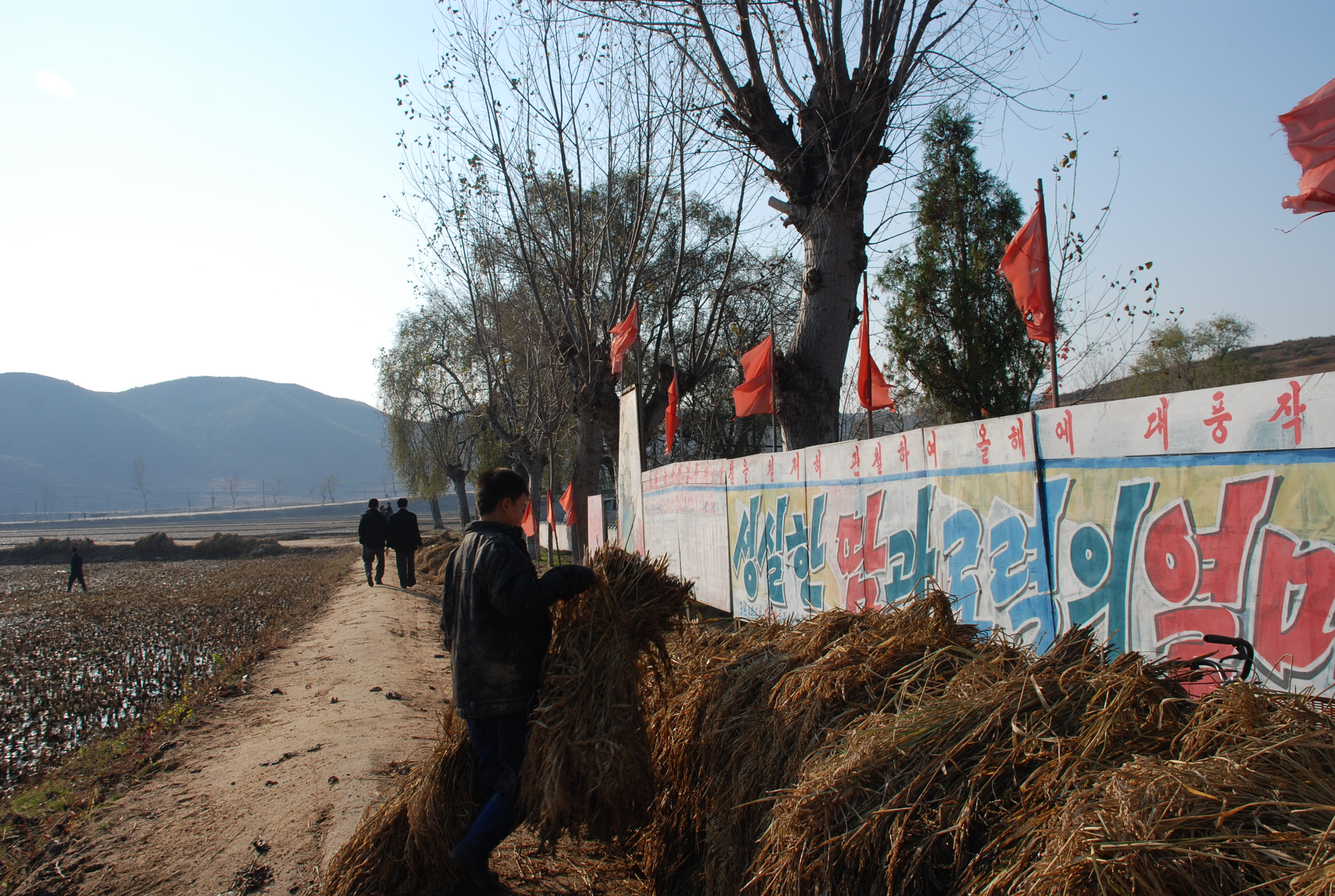
Agriculture in North Korea relies heavily on manual labor with few machines in sight.

As industrialization progressed, the share of agriculture, forestry, and fisheries in the total national output declined from 63.5% and 31.4%, respectively, in 1945 and 1946, to a low of 26.8% in 1990. Their share in the labor force also declined from 57.6% in 1960 to 34.4% in 1989.

In the 1990s, decreasing ability to carry out mechanized operations (including the pumping of water for irrigation), as well as lack of chemical inputs, was clearly contributing to reduced yields and increased harvesting and post-harvest losses.

Incremental improvements in agricultural production have been made since the late 1990s, bringing North Korea close to self-sufficiency in staple foods by 2013. In particular rice yields have steadily improved, though yields on other crops have generally not improved. The production of protein foods remains inadequate. Access to chemical fertilizer has declined, but the use of compost and other organic fertilizer has been encouraged.

=== Crisis and famine (1994–1998) ===
From 1994 to 1998, North Korea suffered a famine. Since 1998, there has been a gradual recovery in agriculture production, which by 2013 brought North Korea back close to self-sufficiency in staple foods. However, as of 2013, most households have borderline or poor food consumption, and consumption of protein remains inadequate.

In the 1990s, the North Korean economy saw stagnation turning into crisis. Economic assistance received from the USSR and China was an important factor of its economic growth. In 1991, the USSR collapsed, withdrew its support, and demanded payment in hard currency for imports. China stepped in to provide some assistance and supplied food and oil, most of it reportedly at concessionary prices. But in 1994, China reduced its exports to North Korea. The rigidity in the political and economic systems of North Korea left the country ill-prepared for a changing world. The North Korean economy was undermined and its industrial output began to decline in 1990.

Deprived of industrial inputs, including fertilizers, pesticides, and electricity for irrigation, agricultural output also started to decrease even before North Korea had a series of natural disasters in the mid-1990s. This evolution, combined with a series of natural disasters including record floods in 1995, caused one of the worst economic crises in North Korea's history. Other causes of this crisis were high defense spending (about 25% of GDP) and bad governance. It is estimated that between 1992 and 1998 North Korea's economy contracted by 50% and several hundred thousand (possibly up to 3 million) people died of starvation.

North Korea announced in December 1993 a 3-year transitional economic policy placing primary emphasis on agriculture, light industry, and foreign trade. A lack of fertilizer, natural disasters, and poor storage and transportation practices have left the country more than a million tons per year short of grain self-sufficiency. Moreover, lack of foreign exchange to purchase spare parts and oil for electricity generation left many factories idle.

The 1990s famine paralyzed many of the Stalinist economic institutions. The government pursued Kim Jong-il's Songun policy, under which the military is deployed to direct production and infrastructure projects. As a consequence of the government's policy of establishing economic self-sufficiency, the North Korean economy has become increasingly isolated from that of the rest of the world, and its industrial development and structure do not reflect its international competitiveness.

=== Food shortages ===
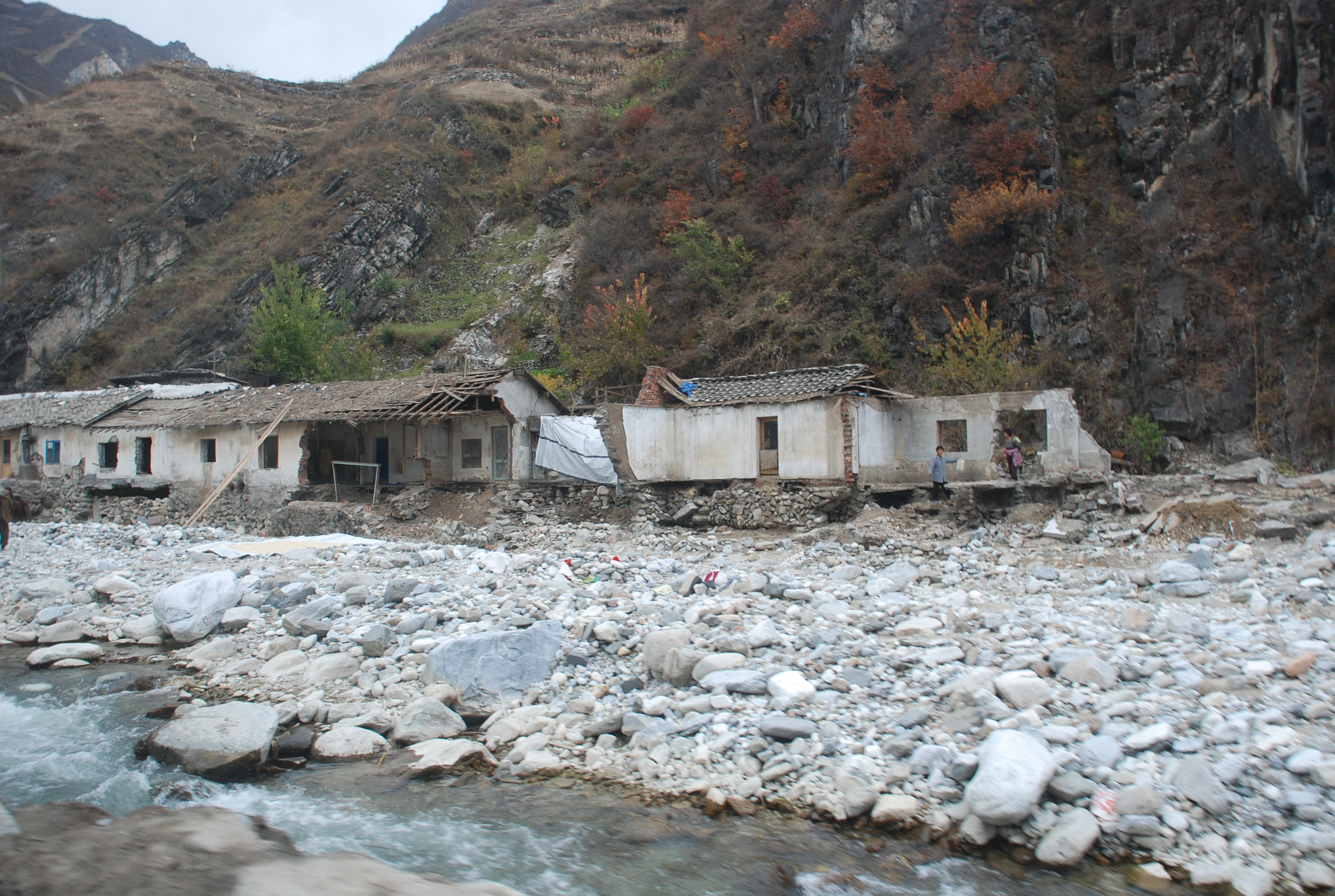
Houses in South Hamgyong Province damaged by floods in July 2012

The food shortage was caused as a direct result of the massive flooding and a mix of political failure and poor amounts of arable land in the country. In 2004, more than half (57%) of the population didn't have enough food to stay healthy. 37% of the children had their growth stunted and 1/3 of mothers were severely undernourished.

In 2006, the World Food Program (WFP) and FAO estimated a requirement of 5.3 to 6.5 million tons of grain when domestic production fulfilled only 3.8 million tons. The country also faces land degradation after forests stripped for agriculture resulted in soil erosion. Harsh weather conditions that dented the agricultural output (wheat and barley production dropped 50% and 80% respectively in 2011) and rising global food prices stressed greater food shortage, putting 6 million North Koreans at risk.

With a dramatic increase on the reliance on private sales of goods, as well as increased international aid, the situation has improved somewhat with undernourishment no longer being a major concern for most North Koreans as of 2014, although PDS (the Public Distribution System) still continues.

The yield in food production in 2016 increased by 7 percent from 4.5 million tonnes in 2015 to 4.8 million tonnes and the North has produced more food than the South. It is estimated production decreased by 2 percent in 2017 to 4.7 million tonnes. Food production further fell in 2018 thus 641 thousand tons is needed to be imported and in comparison to last year when required 456 thousand tons with 390 thousand bought by and 66 thousand received by North Korea. Production was at 4.82 million tons in 2023, up from 4.51 million by 310,000 tons.

== See also ==
- Union of Agricultural Workers of Korea
