= Strong and Prosperous Nation =

Political slogan in North Korea

- Chosŏn'gŭl: 강성대국
- Hancha: 强盛大國
- Revised Romanization: gangseongdaeguk
- McCune–Reischauer: kangsŏngtaeguk

"Strong and Prosperous Nation" (Korean: 강성대국; lit. "powerful and great country") is a political slogan in North Korea which originally described the main policy objective of the country's second supreme leader, Kim Jong Il. Kim Jong Il argued that the military-first policy of Songun was necessary to turn North Korea into a "strong and prosperous nation". He further argued that such a monumentous goal could only be achieved by strengthening the country's commitment to the core principles of Juche (i.e. self-reliance) in the areas of ideology, politics, economics, and defence.

After Kim Jong-il's death on 17 December 2011, his son and successor Kim Jong Un repurposed the slogan to introduce new concepts into North Korean ideological discourse. Kim Jong Un later declared 2012, the centennial of the birth of Kim Il Sung, as the "Year of the Strong and Prosperous Nation".

== Origins ==
Officially, the term "Strong and Prosperous Nation" first appeared as the title of a lengthy editorial published on 22 August 1998 in Rodong Sinmun, the newspaper of the Workers' Party of Korea. The article was heavily promoted to the North Korean public following the publication of another editorial on 9 September 1998, which celebrated the 50th anniversary of North Korea's founding.

South Korea's Ministry of Unification, however, notes that the term had been used prior to the August editorial's publication; its earliest recorded usage was on 8 April 1998, in a news segment by the North Korean state broadcaster KCBC. The following quote accompanied footage of Kim Jong Il providing "on-the-spot guidance" in Chagang Province in February 1998: "When the spirit of Kangson and the revolutionary spirit of Kanggye arise, the fatherland will become a strong and prosperous nation and exert its power throughout the world."

== See also ==
- Propaganda in North Korea
- Hongik Ingan
