= Rodong Sinmun =

Official newspaper of North Korea

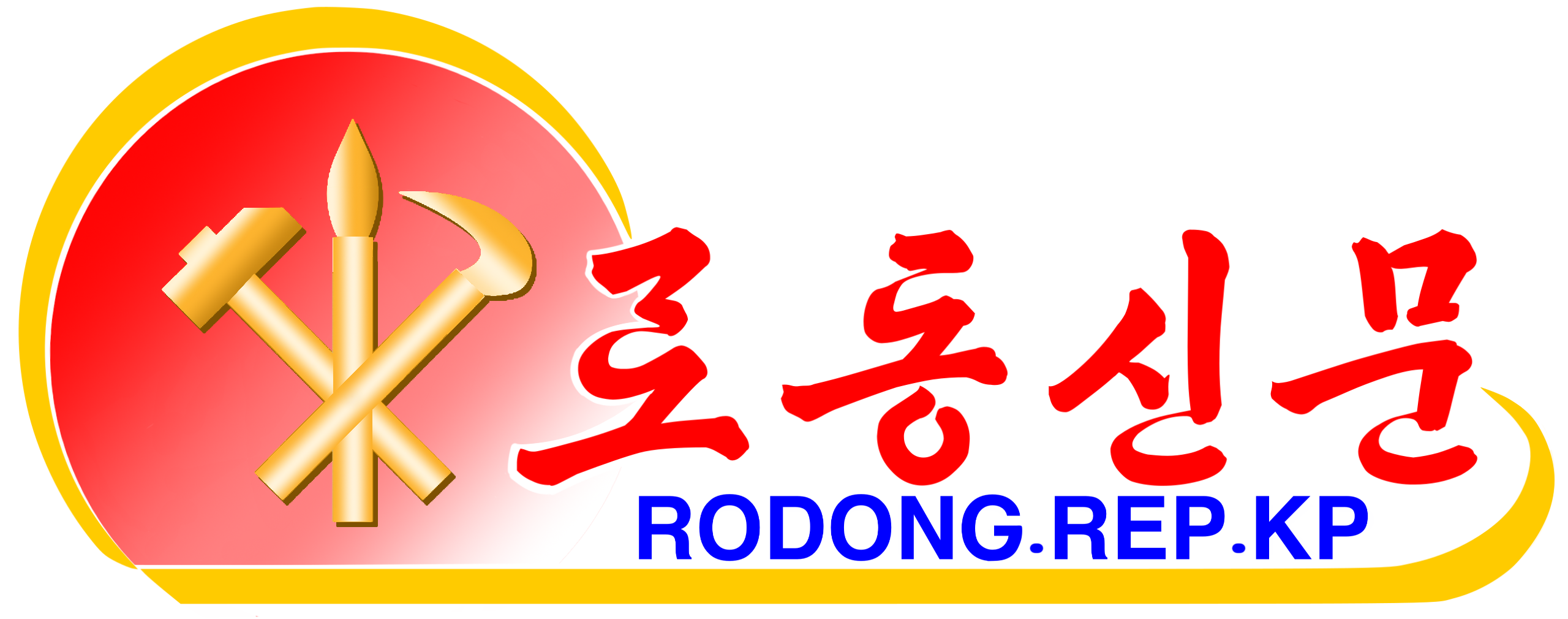

- Front page on 12 November 2011
- Type: Daily newspaper
- Format: Broadsheet
- Owner: Central Committee of the Workers' Party of Korea
- Publisher: Rodong News Agency
- Editor-in-chief: Kim Pyong-ho
- Founded: 1 November 1945
- Political alignment: Workers' Party of Korea
- Headquarters: Pyongyang, North Korea
- Country: North Korea
- Circulation: 600,000 (as of 2015)
- Website: rodong.rep.kp/en/

- Rodong Sinmun
- Hangul: 로동신문
- Hanja: 勞動新聞
- RR: Rodong sinmun
- MR: Rodong sinmun

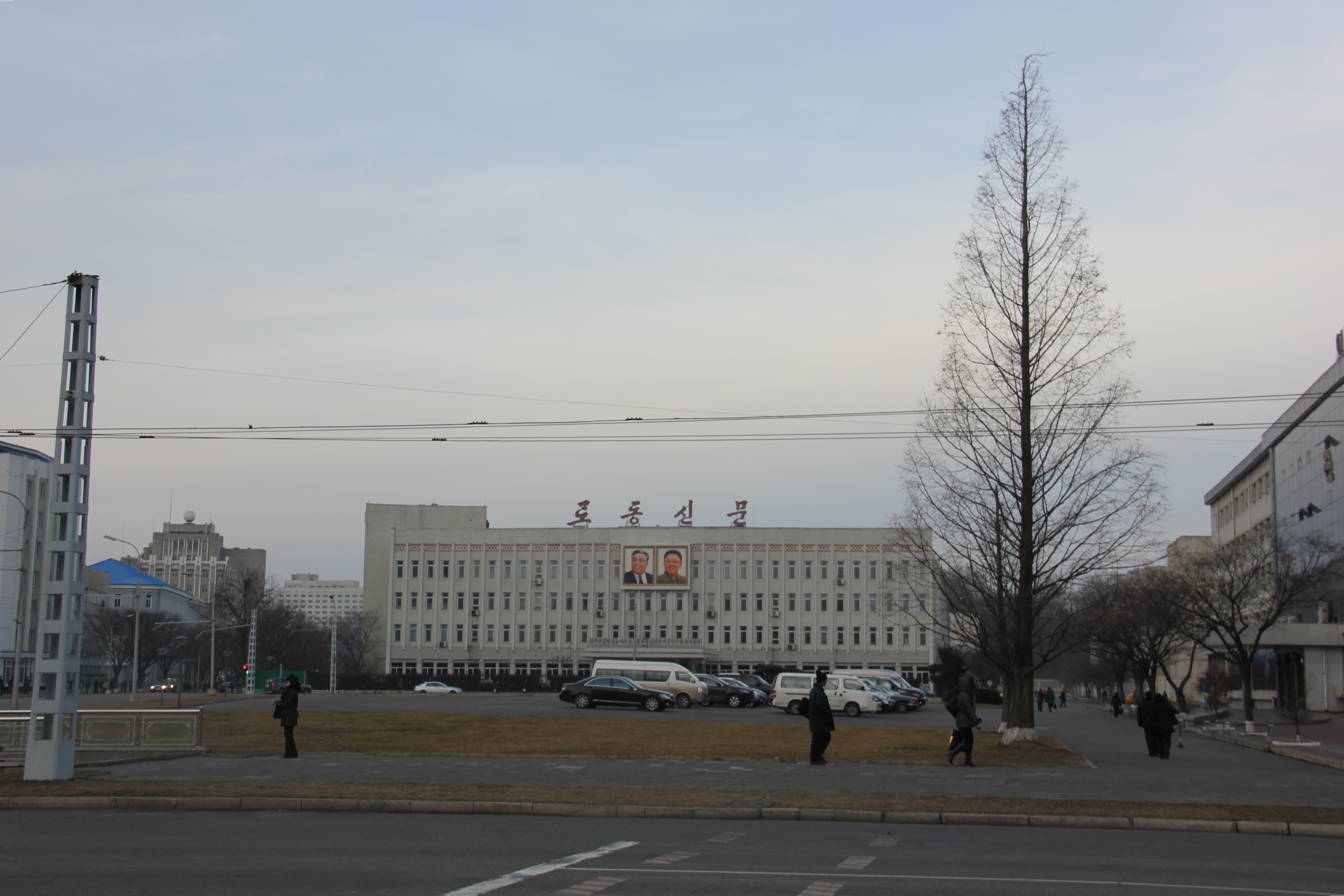
Rodong Sinmun office in Pyongyang

Rodong Sinmun (IPA: [ɾo.doŋ ɕin.mun]; Korean: 로동신문; lit. '"Labor Newspaper"') is the North Korean official newspaper of record of the Central Committee of the Workers' Party of Korea.

Quoted frequently by the Korean Central News Agency (KCNA) and international media, Rodong Sinmun is regarded as a source of official North Korean viewpoints on many issues. The editor-in-chief is Kim Pyong-ho. A list of articles published in Rodong Sinmun since 1946 is available online on the websites of the Information Center on North Korea (unibook.unikorea.go.kr) and the North Korea information portal (nkinfo.unikorea.go.kr).

== History ==
The newspaper was first published on 1 November 1945, as Chŏngro (정로; 正路; lit. 'correct path'), serving as a communication channel for the North Korea Bureau of the Communist Party of Korea. In September 1946, Chŏngro was merged with Chŏnjin, the organ of the New People's Party, and was renamed Rodong Sinmun.

An English-language version of Rodong Sinmun was launched in January 2012.

Following the purge and execution of Jang Song-thaek, Rodong Sinmun deleted some 20,000 articles from its web archives, while others were edited to omit his name.

== Contents ==
Rodong Sinmun is published every day of the year and usually contains six pages. Rodong Sinmun content can be accessed over the Mirae WiFi network in North Korea.

=== New Year editorials ===
Since 1996, Rodong Sinmun, the Korean Central News Agency, Minju Joson, and Joson Inmingun has published a joint New Year editorial that outlines the country's policies for the year. The editorials usually offer praise for the Songun policy, the government and leadership, and encourage the growth of the nation. They are also critical of the policies of South Korea, Japan, the United States, Israel and Western governments towards North Korea and/or its allies. On 1 January 2006, the agency sent out a joint-editorial from North Korea's state newspapers calling for the withdrawal of American forces from South Korea. While annual 1 January editorials are a tradition among the papers, that year's brought attention from Western media outlets, by calling for a "nationwide campaign for driving out the U.S. troops". The editorial made several references to Korean reunification. The 2009 editorial received similar attention, as criticism of United States policy was absent, and the admission of severe economic problems in North Korea. The editorial also made reference to denuclearisation on the Korean Peninsula, in what analysts claimed was a "hopeful" sign. This was echoed again in its 2010 editorial, which called for an end to hostilities with the United States and a nuclear free Korean Peninsula.

The 2011 joint editorial edition, aside from its calls for a denuclearized Korea and for a slowdown of tensions between the two Koreas, has for the first time, mentioned the rising light industries of North Korea, given as a reason for an upcoming upsurge in the national economy in the new year and for the achievement of the Kangsong Taeguk national mission. The practice of a joint New Year editorial ended in 2013 when Kim Jong Un delivered the first New Year speech on television in 19 years.

In June 2018, Rodong Sinmun devoted a four-page feature to the North Korea–United States summit, welcoming its results. The article carried the text of the declaration in full. In addition, it mentioned security guarantees and Donald Trump's pledge to cease the joint military exercises with South Korea, and failed to mention the promise Kim had allegedly made to Trump about closing down a test site for missile engines.

== See also ==
- List of newspapers in North Korea
- Media of North Korea
- Politics of North Korea
- Telecommunications in North Korea
- People's Daily, Mainland Chinese counterpart
- Pravda, Soviet counterpart
