= Joson Inmingun =

Newspaper of the North Korean army

- Type: Weekly newspaper
- Format: Tabloid
- Editor-in-chief: Ri Hyo Seong
- Founded: 1948
- Language: Korean
- City: Pyongyang
- Country: North Korea

Korean name
- Hangul: 조선인민군
- Hanja: 朝鮮人民軍
- RR: Joseon inmingun
- MR: Chosŏn inmin'gun

Joson Inmingun (Korean: 조선인민군; lit. 'Korean People's Army') is the newspaper of Korean People's Army. It was first published on July 10, 1948.

== See also ==
- List of newspapers in North Korea
- Telecommunications in North Korea
- Media of North Korea
