= Songun =

North Korean militarist policy

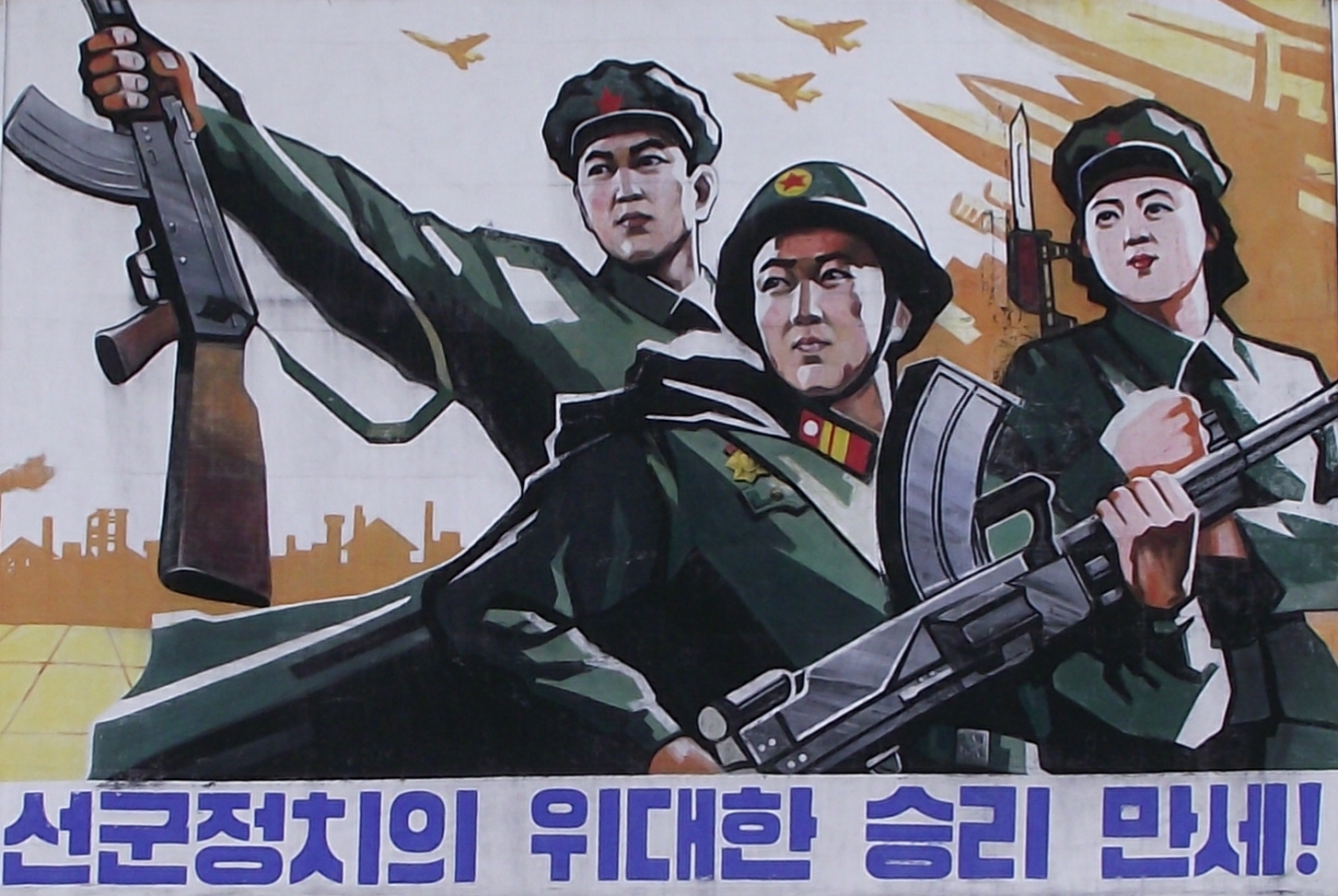
- North Korean propaganda art promoting Songun. The Korean text reads, "Long live the great victory of Songun!"

Songun
- Hangul: 선군정치
- Hanja: 先軍政治
- Lit.: Military-first politics
- RR: Seongun jeongchi
- MR: Sŏn'gun chŏngch'i

Songun (Korean: 선군) is the "military-first" ideology and policy of North Korea, prioritizing the Korean People's Army in the affairs of state and allocation of resources. "Military-first" as a principle guides political and economic life in North Korea, with "military-first politics" dominating the political system; "a line of military-first economic construction" acting as an economic system; and "military-first ideology" serving as the guiding ideology.

Songun elevates the Korean People's Army within North Korea as an organization and as a state function, granting it the primary position in the North Korean government and society. It guides domestic policy and international interactions. It is the framework for the government, designating the military as the "supreme repository of power". The government grants the Korean People's Army the highest economic and resource-allocation priority and positions it as the model for society to emulate. Songun represents the ideological concept behind a shift in policies since 1994 which emphasize the people's military over all other aspects of state and society.

== History ==
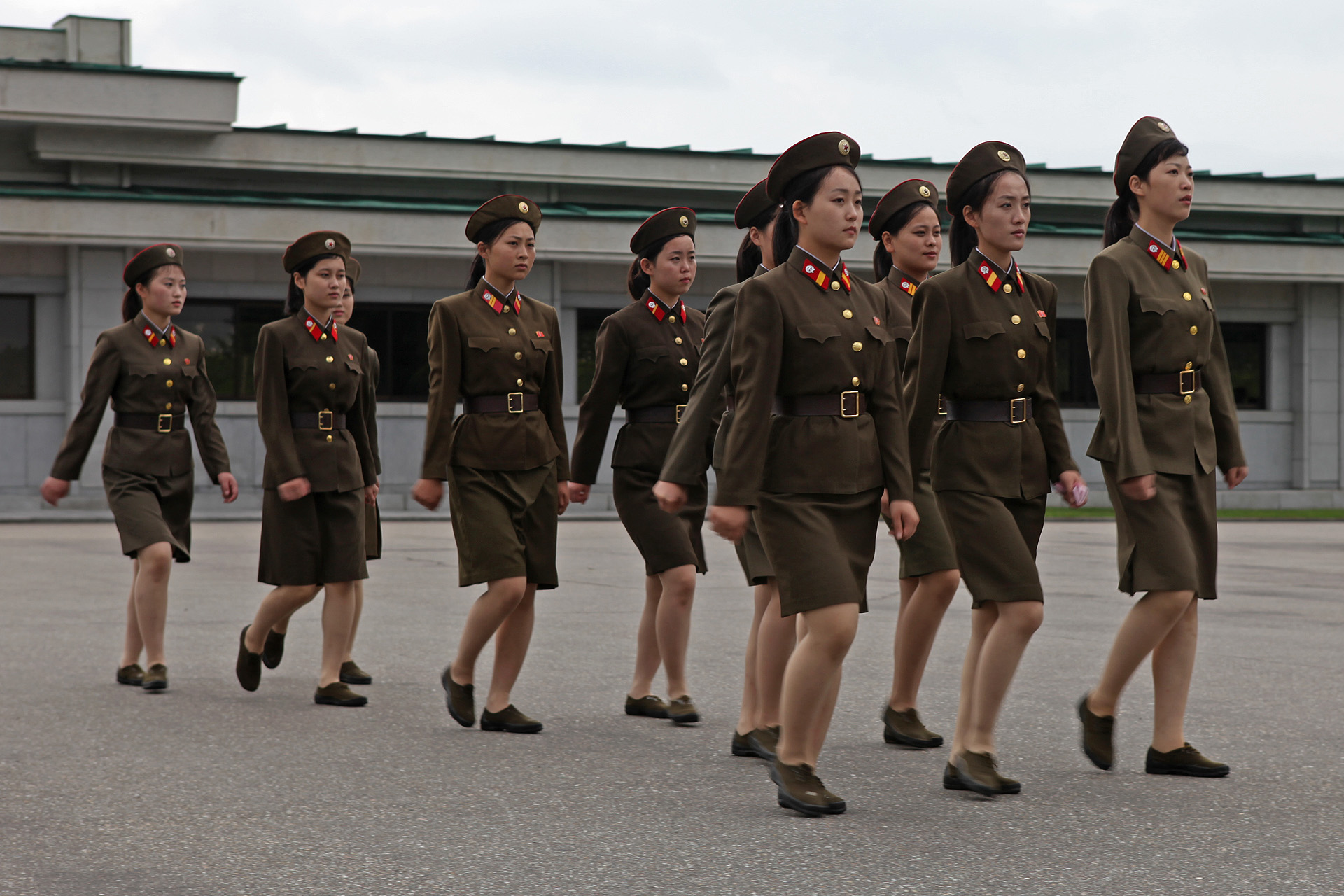
North Korean female soldiers

The roots of Songun can be traced back to Kim Il Sung's guerilla activities against the Japanese during the 1930s. During this time, Kim Il Sung came to believe that a nation's independence, sovereignty, and prosperity were dependent on the existence of an organized and well-armed fighting force.

The "four military lines" (사대군사노선; 四大軍事路線) policy implemented by Kim Il Sung in 1962 was a precursor to Songun. The policy aimed to arm the entire population, fortify the state, educate every soldier to become a party cadre, and modernize the People's Army.

Songun did not appear as an official government policy until after Kim Il Sung's death in 1994. In the wake of his first visit to a military unit in 1995, Kim Jong Il, the son of Kim Il Sung, introduced Songun as "a revolutionary idea of attaching great importance to the army" and "a politics emphasizing the perfect unity and the single-hearted unity of the party, army and the people, and the role of the army as the vanguards". This was a shift from the government's previous guiding policy, Kim Il Sung's Juche. According to the North Korean government, Kim Jong Il's inspiration for Songun came from a visit with his father to the Seoul 105th Guards Armored Division headquarters in Pyongyang on 25 August 1960. 25 August is now a national holiday, the Day of Songun.

A 1997 editorial published in Rodong Sinmun, the official newspaper of the Workers' Party of Korea, stated, "Never before have the status and role of the People's Army been so extraordinarily elevated as today when it is being led energetically by the Respected and Beloved Comrade Supreme Commander". By this point, the Korean People's Army had also become "synonymous with the people, the state, and the party".

In 1998, Songun began appearing in conjunction with other terms, including "military-first revolutionary idea", "military-first revolutionary leadership" and "military-first politics", expanding the concept of Songun into even more aspects of North Korean governance.

Songun became an even more prominent concept in January 1999, making its first appearance in the important New Year's Day editorial published jointly by all the major news organs of North Korea. The editorial tied Songun with Kim Jong Il by declaring that he practiced military-first leadership, which is "one in which the People's Army serves as the main force of revolution and in which the unity of the army and the people helps to safeguard as well as build socialism". In foreign language publications, the translated term "army-first" substituted for Songun between 1999 and 2006, after which the Korean term has been used exclusively.

In January 2003, the New Year's editorial added military-first ideology (Songun sasang) to the pantheon of military-first concepts. In December 2003, the "Essential Attributes of Military-First Politics" was published as a new vision of the driving force of the revolution in the quasi-communist North Korea. It assigned the main force of the revolution to the Korean People's Army. This is a role that in communist states is traditionally assigned to the proletariat, or in China to the peasantry. However, for North Korea "only the army meets the criteria of loyalty, revolutionary spirit, cohesiveness, and esprit de corps". January 2004 saw another increase in the reach of Songun as it was mentioned more frequently than any other word in the New Year's editorial and was used to describe everything from politics to Korea itself.

Songun has continued to expand in importance and is even now included in the ideological discussion of reunification with South Korea. The North Korean press stated: "[S]ongun politics is the guarantee that will secure the re-unification of the Fatherland". North Korea also credits Songun with safeguarding the peace on the peninsula and claims that it is the only thing preventing the United States from attacking North Korea. Songun has become intrinsic to North Korea's domestic politics, foreign policy and decision-making, making a place alongside Juche as a guiding principle of the state.

According to author Suki Kim's memoir of her time teaching at Pyongyang University of Science and Technology, there are twelve "Wonders of Songun": The sunrise at Mount Paektu (the alleged birthplace of Kim Jong Il); the winter pine trees at the Dabaksol guard post (where Kim Jong Il supposedly launched the Songun policy); the Cheollyeong azaleas (a "frontline" hill where Kim Jong Il visited often); the evening view of Jangji Mountain near the Changja River (a refuge for a young Kim Jong Il during the Korean War); the sound of the Ullim Waterfall in the mountains above Munchon, Kangwon Province (as it is the sound of a "powerful and prosperous nation"); the horizon at Handurebol (the Handure Plain in Taechon County) for this was the location of Kim Jong Il's land reform in 1998 after the famine; Taehongdan County's large fields of potato flowers (Kim Il Sung is said to have fought the Japanese here and Kim Jong Il turned it into the country's largest potato farm); the area around the mountain village of Beoman-ri in Sohung County, North Hwanghae Province (Kim Jong Il rebuilt the village after the famine and is claimed as the "pride of a communist country"); the bean (or nut) farming program Kim Jong Un instituted to provide food for the military; the large rice farm in Migok, Sariwon; the Taedonggang fruit farm in Pyongyang; and the Ryongjung fish farm in South Hwanghae Province. A thirteenth "wonder" is reported to have been created in 2016. The first nine of these sites have been heavily promoted by North Korean authorities and have become tourist destinations.

== Rationale ==
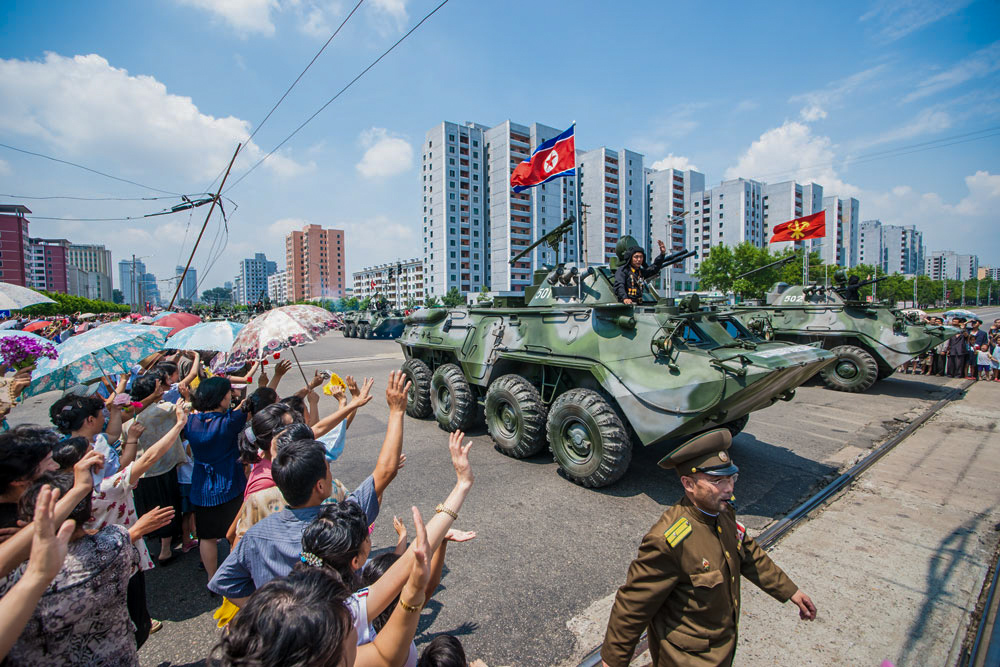
Armored personnel carriers of the Korean People's Army on parade

Two reasons have been offered as to why after Kim Il Sung's death North Korea shifted to Songun as a major ideology. One strand of the debate points to North Korea's desire to increase its military strength due to its precarious international position. In this sense, Songun is perceived as an aggressive, threatening move to increase the strength of the North Korean military at the expense of other parts of society.

This argument also often points to the series of crises that befell North Korea in the early 1990s, beginning with the fall of its long-time ally the Soviet Union in 1991, followed by the death of Kim Il Sung (1994), several natural disasters, the North Korean famine and economic crisis, all before 1999. These also could have served as motivation for a new method of consolidation of power.

The second strand focuses on internal North Korean politics as the cause for the move to military-first politics. When Kim Il Sung died, he left leadership of North Korea to his son, Kim Jong Il. At the time of his father's death, the most important position held by Kim Jong Il in the North Korean government was military, specifically second in command of the military.

Additionally, in order to keep control of the government Kim Jong Il would need to secure his support base within the Korean People's Army. This line of argument points out that Kim Jong Il deliberately chose to sideline other aspects of the government in order to assert the primacy of the Korean People's Army. This included abolishing the Central People's Committee, the state presidency and sidelining the North Korean Administration Council.

== Political implications ==
One implication of Songun policies is that they not only worked with Juche, the self-reliance ideal promoted by Kim Il Sung, but it also replaced it as the central state ideology as Kim Jong Il consolidated his power.

The ascendency of the Korean People's Army concerns South Korea and ties into the debate over the Sunshine Policy, its most recent vision of Korean reunification. North Korea's insistence that Songun will facilitate reunification conflicts with South Korea's natural position, whose government is not at all supportive of Songun policies, and where promotion of North Korea's military-first ideas is prohibited.

Songun politics have also thrived on the ongoing nuclear crisis. For the United States, given that its primary concern is the denuclearisation of the peninsula, the concept of military-first politics and ideology is a troubling one. Songun also seems to fit very well with the possession of nuclear weapons and can be seen as a way of making such weapons central to the government's guiding ideology of self-governance. It has been said that the longer military-first ideology guides the North Korean government, the less likely it will be that the United States will be able to convince North Korea to give up its nuclear weapons programme. North Korea could perceive attempts at denuclearisation and normalisation of affairs with the United States as a threat to the primacy of the military within North Korea and thus a threat to Songun ideology, a fear which puts into doubt the idea that North Korea may become willing to give up its nuclear weapons programme.

== Economic implications ==
"Military-first politics" originated with the attempt at recovery—the "Arduous March"—from the economic troubles during the famine that swept North Korea in the 1990s. In order to overcome the economic crisis, the army was expected to work at the forefront. The government set a strategic goal of becoming "a powerful and prosperous nation" through its military-first policy. Sergey Kurbanov, head of the Institute of Korean Studies of the University of Saint Petersburg, described in his Daily NK interview how the members of the nouveau riche in North Korea support the military-first politics in order to secure their wealth.

== See also ==
- Byungjin ("parallel development", a term used by Kim Il Sung and Kim Jong Un)
- Conscription
- Guns versus butter model
- Martial law
- Militarism
- Military dictatorship
- Military-First Girls – Japanese fan club of the Moranbong Band
- Military–industrial complex
- Military Keynesianism
- Park Chung Hee
- Stratocracy
- War economy
