= Taehongdan County =

Coordinates: 42°00′04″N 128°51′05″E

Taehongdan County 대홍단군
- County

Korean transcription(s)
  - Chosŏn'gŭl: 대홍단군
  - Hancha: 大紅湍郡
  - McCune-Reischauer: Taehongdan-gun
  - Revised Romanization: Daehongdan-gun
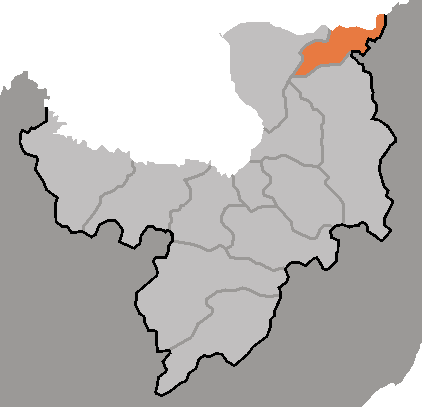
- Map of Ryanggang showing the location of Taehongdan
- Country: North Korea
- Province: Ryanggang
- Administrative divisions: 1 ŭp, 9 workers' districts

Area
  - Total: 680.9 km^{2} (262.9 sq mi)

Population (2008 census)
  - Total: 35,596
  - Density: 52.28/km^{2} (135.4/sq mi)

Taehongdan County is a kun, or county, in Ryanggang province, North Korea. It was originally part of Musan County.

The Taehongdan Revolutionary Battle Site there commemorates battles waged by Kim Il Sung in the area during the anti-Japanese struggle.

== Geography ==
To the north, Taehongdan looks across the Tumen River at China. It stands on the northwest edge of the Paektu Plateau. The highest of its many peaks is Changchongsan (Korean: 장청산). The chief river is the Tumen. Some 91% of the county's area is taken up by forestland. Due to its inland location, Taehongdan has a continental climate with cold winters.

== Administrative divisions ==
Taehongdan county is divided into 1 ŭp (town) and 9 rodongjagu (workers' districts):

- Taehongdan-ŭp (대홍단읍/大紅湍邑)
- Hŭngam-rodongjagu (홍암로동자구/紅岩勞動者區)
- Kaech'ŏl-lodongjagu (개척로동자구/開拓勞動者區)
- Nongsa-rodongjagu (농사로동자구/農事勞動者區)
- Sambong-rodongjagu (삼봉로동자구/三峰勞動者區)
- Samjang-rodongjagu (삼장로동자구/三長勞動者區)
- Sindŏng-rodongjagu (신덕로동자구/新德勞動者區)
- Sinhŭng-rodongjagu (신흥로동자구/新興勞動者區)
- Sŏdu-rodongjagu (서두로동자구/西頭勞動者區)
- Yugong-rodongjagu (유곡로동자구/楡谷勞動者區)

== Economy ==
Logging is an important local industry. Agriculture is also key, with the county leading the nation in potato production and also producing barley, wheat and soybeans. Livestock are also raised in the county, and there is some manufacturing.

== Transportation ==
Taehongdan is served by roads, but not by rail.

== See also ==
- Geography of North Korea
- Administrative divisions of North Korea
- Ryanggang
