= Chollima (disambiguation) =

Chollima is a Korean mythological horse.

Chollima may also refer to:

- Chollima (magazine), a North Korean art magazine
- Chollima (website), a North Korean website
- Chollima Movement, a state-sponsored movement in North Korea to promote rapid economic development
- Chollima-1, a North Korean orbital satellite carrier rocket operated by North Korea's National Aerospace Technology Administration
- Chollima, a county of Nampo, North Korea
- Chollima Statue, a monument in Pyongyang
- Chollima Line on the Pyongyang Metro
- The nickname of the Korea DPR national football team
- Free Joseon, North Korean resistance movement formerly named Cheollima Civil Defense
- Ricochet Chollima, North Korean state sponsored hacking group
