= North Korean won =

Currency of North Korea

Korean people's won
조선 인민 원 (Korean)
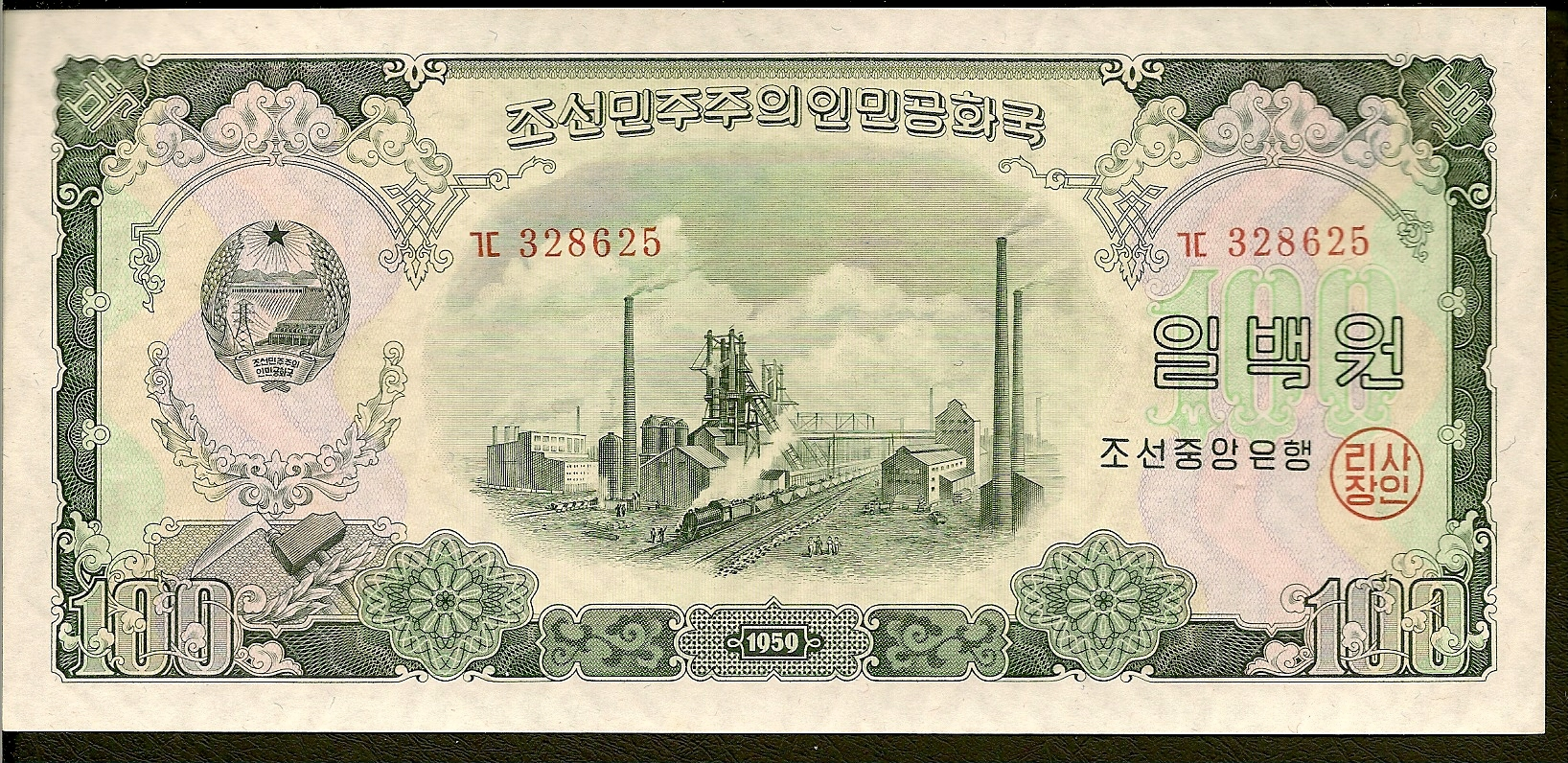
- 1959 ₩100 banknote

ISO 4217
- Code: KPW (numeric: 408)
- Subunit: 0.01

Units of account
- Base unit: won (Korean: 원)
- Plural: The language(s) of this currency do(es) not have a morphological plural distinction.
- Symbol: ₩
- Subunit
- 1/100: chon (Korean: 전) (Note: Chon-denominated coins are now rarely used due to inflation.)

Denominations
- Banknotes
- Freq. used: ₩100, ₩200, ₩500, ₩1000, ₩2000, ₩5000
- Rarely used: ₩5, ₩10, ₩50
- Coins
- Rarely used: 1, 5, 10, 50 chon; ₩1

Demographics
- Date of introduction: c. 1947
- User(s): North Korea

Issuance
- Central bank: Central Bank of the Democratic People's Republic of Korea

- Democratic People's Republic of Korea won
- Hangul: 조선민주주의인민공화국 원
- Hanja: 朝鮮民主主義人民共和國 圓
- RR: Joseon minjujuui inmin gonghwaguk won
- MR: Chosŏn minjujuŭi inmin konghwaguk wŏn

Korean people's won
- Hangul: 조선 인민 원
- Hanja: 朝鮮 人民 圓
- RR: Joseon inmin won
- MR: Chosŏn inmin wŏn

The Korean people's won (symbol: ₩; code: KPW; Korean: 조선 인민 원), more commonly known as the North Korean won (Korean: 조선 원; known as 북한 원 in South Korea) and sometimes known as the Democratic People's Republic of Korea won (Korean: 조선민주주의인민공화국 원), is the official currency of North Korea.

Each won (원) is technically subdivided into 100 chon (전), but chon-denominated coins are now rarely used due to inflation. The currency is issued by the Central Bank of the Democratic People's Republic of Korea, which produces both coins and banknotes; it is based in the capital city of Pyongyang. The won has been issued since 1947, and has been the only currency issued in North Korea since.

== Etymology ==
Won, like Japanese yen, is borrowed from Chinese yuan (written as 圓 in hanja; and 원 in hangul). It means "round shape".

== History ==
=== 1947–2009 ===
After the division of Korea, North Korea continued using the Korean yen for two years, until the Central Bank of the Democratic People's Republic of Korea was established on 6 December 1947 and the first North Korean won was issued. In February 1959, the second North Korean won was introduced, equal to 100 old won.

From 1978 onwards, the North Korean government maintained a rate of ₩2.16 to each US dollar, which may have been based upon Kim Jong Il's birthday, February 16. Over the decades, however, rampant inflation eroded the currency's value, and from 2001 the government abandoned the rate in favor of those closer to the black market's. A report by defectors from North Korea claimed the black market rate was ₩570 to each Chinese yuan (about ₩4,000 per US dollar) in June 2009.

=== 2009 revaluation ===
The third North Korean won was introduced in a revaluation in November 2009, the first in 50 years. North Koreans were given seven days to exchange a maximum of ₩100,000 (worth approximately US$40 on the black market) in ₩1,000 notes for ₩10 notes, but after protests by some of the populace, the limit was raised to ₩150,000 in cash and ₩300,000 in bank savings. The official exchange rate at this time was around $740, but black market value of the ₩150,000 was estimated to be near $30. The revaluation, seen as a move against private market activity, wiped out many North Koreans' savings. The Times speculated that the move may have been an attempt by the North Korean government to control price inflation and destroy the fortunes of local black market money traders. The announcement was made to foreign embassies but not in North Korean state media.

As part of the process, the old notes ceased to be legal tender on 30 November 2009, but notes valued in the new won were not distributed until 7 December 2009. North Koreans were thus unable to exchange any money for goods or services for a week, and most shops, restaurants and transport services were shut down. The only services that remained open were those catering to the political elite and foreigners who both continued to trade exclusively in foreign currency. The measure led to concerns amongst North Korean officials that the move would result in civil unrest. China's Xinhua News Agency described North Korean citizens as being in a "collective panic"; army bases were put on alert and there were unconfirmed reports of public protests in the streets in a handful of North Korean cities and towns, forcing authorities to slightly increase the amount of currency people were allowed to exchange. Piles of old bills were also set on fire in separate locations across the country, old paper notes were dumped in a stream (against laws of the desecration of images of Kim Il Sung), and two black market traders were shot dead in the streets of Pyongsong by local police, according to international reports. Authorities threatened "merciless punishment" for any person violating the rules of the currency change.

Pictures of the new notes were published on 4 December 2009 in the Chosun Shinbo, a North Korean newspaper based in Japan. The paper claimed that the measure would weaken the free market and strengthen the country's socialist system. However, the won plummeted 96 percent against the U.S. dollar in the ensuing days after revaluation. Authorities eventually raised the limit to 500,000 won, Chosun reported, and promised no probes into savings of up to one million won, and unlimited withdrawals if savings of more than one million were properly accounted for.

In February 2010, some of the curbs on the free market were eased, and a senior party official was sacked after incidents of unrest. Pak Nam-gi, the director of the Planning and Finance Department of North Korea's ruling Workers' Party, was executed later in 2010. North Korea denied any serious crisis relating to the revaluation.

== Coins ==
=== First won ===
No coins were issued under the first won of 1947–1959.

=== Second won ===
The first North Korean coins for circulation were minted in 1959 in denominations of 1, 5, and 10 chon. These coins were often restruck with the original dates in later years; however, 1970 and 1974 dates also appear on the 1 and 5 chon. In 1978, 50 chon coins featuring the Chollima Statue and a rising sun were introduced into circulation during the 1979 currency reform to allow greater flexibility for vendors by eliminating the 50 chon banknote and large amounts of "small change" coinage carried. In 1987, 1 won coins featuring the Grand People's Study House were introduced, but did not fully replace the 1 won note which remained legal tender.

When the historic 2.16 peg to the dollar was abandoned in 2001 to allow for greater convertibility, the coins began to lose value. After 2003, these coins were rarely seen in circulation but were still redeemable. Later, a new set of coins was introduced in 2005 in denominations of 5, 10, 50, and 100 won. These coins were less impressive compared to the older series, being very plain and generic in design. All circulation coins of the second won were struck in aluminum.

Circulated coins
Image	Value	Technical parameters		Description		Date of minted year			
Image	Value	Diameter	Composition	Obverse	Reverse	General issue (no star)	Socialist visitor (1 star)	Capitalist visitor (2 stars)	Year last circulated
	1 chon	16 mm	Aluminium	State title, coat of arms, year of minting	Value (optionally, star(s))	1959, 1970	1959	1959	?
	5 chon	18 mm	Aluminium	State title, coat of arms, year of minting	Value (optionally, star(s))	1959, 1974	1974	1974	?
	10 chon	20 mm	Aluminium	State title, coat of arms, year of minting	Value (optionally, star(s))	1959	1959	1959	?
	50 chon	25 mm	Aluminium	Bank title, Coat of arms, value	Chollima Statue, year of minting (optionally, star(s))	1978	1978	1978	?
	₩1	27 mm	Aluminium	Bank title, Coat of arms, value, year of minting	Grand People's Study House	1987	N/A	N/A	?
	₩5	21 mm	Aluminium	Bank title, Coat of arms, value, year of minting	Value	2005	N/A	N/A	2009
	₩10	23 mm	Aluminium	Bank title, Coat of arms, value, year of minting	Value	2005	N/A	N/A	2009
	₩50	25 mm	Aluminium	Bank title, Coat of arms, value, year of minting	Value	2005	N/A	N/A	2009
	₩100	27 mm	Aluminium	Bank title, Coat of arms, value, year of minting	Value	2005	N/A	N/A	2009
For table standards, see the coin specification table.

Following other socialist economies like Cuba and China, North Korea developed a special system of marking coins for two groups of foreign visitors. Issued in 1983, these coins were part of the "Pakkundon" convertible series. Coins with no "stars" were for general circulation in North Korea, coins marked with one star were for "socialist visitors", and coins marked with two stars were designated for "capitalist visitors". A fourth set, intended for collectors rather than circulation, was struck with the word "specimen" or "example" in Korean characters in the areas where the stars would be. The specimen/example set is the least common of the four. Besides the general circulating coins, there is an abundance of different commemorative coins minted in the name of the DPRK. Most, if not all of them, are sold to foreign numismatists. Some of these are official, state approved coins, others are not.

=== Third won ===
Coins were issued in 10, 50 chon and 1 won denominations in 2002, and 1 and 5 chon denominations in 2008. All denominations are struck in aluminum. These coins feature the national coat of arms on the obverse and different flowers on the reverse, particularly the Kimjongilia and the Kimilsungia, adorns the 50 chon and 1 won coins, respectively.

Initially struck in 2002, the coins were intended for use shortly after the dollar peg was removed from the currency. The 50 chon and 1 won coins were smaller than the previous designs, while the new 10 chon coin was the same size as the old. Hyperinflation became a very sudden reality, however, and the new coins were never released as planned. In 2008, 1 and 5 chon coins were also struck when a plan for monetary revaluation began. The coins were finally released into circulation in December 2009, but due to the flawed nature of the revaluation, these coins again have very little value, the 1 and 5 chon coins in particular being virtually irrelevant. Higher denominations of 50, 100, 500, 1000 and 2000 Won were minted in 2022

Circulated coins
Value	Technical parameters			Description		Date of minted year
Value	Diameter	Mass	Composition	Obverse	Reverse	Date of minted year
1 chon	18.0 mm	0.8 g	Aluminium	Coat of arms, value	Royal azalea, year of minting	2008
5 chon	19.0 mm	0.9 g	Aluminium	Coat of arms, value	Tree peony, year of minting	2008
10 chon	20.0 mm	1.0 g	Aluminium	Coat of arms, value	Azalea, year of minting	2002
50 chon	22.1 mm	1.55 g	Aluminium	Coat of arms, value	Kimjongilia, year of minting	2002
₩1	24.1 mm	1.9 g	Aluminium	Coat of arms, value	Kimilsungia, year of minting	2002
For table standards, see the coin specification table.

Circulated coins
Value	Technical parameters			Description		Date of minted year
Value	Diameter	Mass	Composition	Obverse	Reverse	Date of minted year
50 Won	18.0 mm	0.8 g	Copper Nickel	Coat of arms, value	Denomination	2022
100 Won	19.0 mm	0.9 g	Copper Nickel	Coat of arms, value	Denomination	2022
500 Won	23.1 mm	5.1 g	Copper Nickel	Coat of arms, value	Denomination	2022
1000 Won	24.02.1 mm	5.6 g	Copper Nickel	Coat of arms, value	Denomination	2022
2000 Won	25.0 mm	6.0 g	Copper Nickel	Coat of arms, value	Denomination	2022
For table standards, see the coin specification table.

== Banknotes ==
The first banknotes of issued by a Northern partition of Korea were issued in 1945 by the Soviet-backed provisional government above the 38th parallel. These were in denominations of 1, 5, 10, and 100 won. These were discontinued shortly after Soviet forces withdrew and recognized the newly independent state.

=== First won ===
This currency was issued in all-banknote form, with the first banknotes of this issue in denominations of 15, 20, and 50 chon along with 1, 5, 10 and 100 won in 1947. The chon notes had stylized art designs, while the won denominations were fairly uniform in design, featuring a farmer and a worker standing together and holding the symbolic tools. This currency was later revalued in 1959 at a rate of one new won to 100 old won to curb the inflation that had occurred as a result of the Korean War.

=== Second won ===
In 1959, the old won was replaced with the second won, with price and exchange rates fixed to the U.S. dollar. This banknote series was issued in denominations of 50 chon, and 1, 5, 10, 50, and 100 won. These notes were much larger than the previous issue and depicted images representing various industries in the North Korean economy.

In 1979, the currency was again reformed, and a new banknote series was issued in denominations of 1, 5, 10, 50, and 100 won. There is ongoing speculation as to why this move was made. All 1959 banknotes were removed from circulation. Circulating coins, however, were not affected by this change. The designs for this issue were much more symbolic and charismatic than previous ones, with Kim Il Sung featuring for the first time on the 100 won note.

In 1992, another redesign was carried out for banknotes, again in denominations of 1, 5, 10, 50, and 100 won. Older notes were once again withdrawn. These notes were smaller and crisper than the previous issue and depicted more modern themes. The 5 and 10 won banknotes were again issued in 1998, along with a 500 won banknote that same year but were stamped rather than engraved reflecting poorer production quality. In 2002, 1,000 and 5,000 won notes were introduced, followed by a 200 won note in 2005. The former two were identical in design to the 100 won though differing in colors and added security features, but the colored fields behind the text no longer extended all the way to the margins. In 2007, the 500 won had also been revised in this same manner along with being engraved for the first time to protect against counterfeiting. From 1998 onwards, all notes were dated using the Juche year along with the standard dating.

In 2005, the Central Bank of the Democratic People's Republic of Korea issued commemorative 200, 500, 1000 and 5000 won notes to celebrate the 60th anniversary of the foundation of North Korea. It consists of an overprint on its regular issue notes.

In 2007, a commemorative version of this banknote series was released, stamped "Great Leader Comrade Kim Il Sung's 95th Birthday" on all denominations.

Banknotes of the North Korean won (1978 issue)
Main color	Value	Obverse	Reverse
Olive green	₩1	A student, woman and children	Male and female soldiers; Yang Helyong (scenes from the opera Sea of Blood)
Blue-gray	₩5	Worker with a cogwheel and holding a political book; peasant woman holding a sheaf of wheat; factories in the background	Mount Kumgang
Brown	₩10	Chollima	Chollima Steel Complex
Olive green	₩50	Soldier; peasant woman; officials of the Workers' Party of Korea	Lake
Brown and lilac	₩100	Kim Il Sung	Mangyongdae (the birthplace of Kim Il Sung)

Banknotes in circulation for the second won, up to December 2009, were as follows:

1992 series
Value	Dimensions	Main Color	Description			Date of issue
Value	Dimensions	Main Color	Obverse	Reverse	Watermark	Date of issue
₩1	116 × 55 mm	Green	Actress Hong Young-hee in her film role as The Flower Girl	Mount Kumgang	Chollima Statue	1992
₩5	126 × 60 mm	Blue	Students, Kim Il Sung University, Mangyongdae School Children's Palace	Grand People's Study House	Chollima Statue	1992
₩5	126 × 60 mm	Blue	Students, Kim Il Sung University, Mangyongdae School Children's Palace	Grand People's Study House	Chollima Statue	1998
₩10	136 × 65 mm	Brown-orange	Factory worker, Chollima (1,000 ri horse)	Pi Do Island, Western sea barrage and locks at Taedong River(Taedong-gang)	Chollima Statue	1992
₩10	136 × 65 mm	Brown-orange	Factory worker, Chollima (1,000 ri horse)	Pi Do Island, Western sea barrage and locks at Taedong River(Taedong-gang)	Chollima Statue	1998
₩50	146 × 70 mm	Orange	Young professionals, Juche Tower	Mount Paektu	Juche Tower	1992
₩100	156 × 75 mm	Red and brown	Kim Il Sung	The birthplace of Kim Il Sung, Mangyongdae-guyok	Arch of Triumph	1992
₩200	140 × 72 mm	Blue and green	Mongnan (National Flower of North Korea)	Value	Chollima Statue	2005
₩500	156 × 75 mm	Dark green	Kumsusan Memorial Palace	Chongryu Bridge	Arch of Triumph	1998
₩500	156 × 75 mm	Dark green	Kumsusan Memorial Palace	Chongryu Bridge	Arch of Triumph	2007
₩1000	156 × 75 mm	Green-cyan	Kim Il Sung	The birthplace of Kim Il Sung, Mangyongdae-guyok	Arch of Triumph	2002
₩1000	156 × 75 mm	Green-cyan	Kim Il Sung	The birthplace of Kim Il Sung, Mangyongdae-guyok	Arch of Triumph	2006
₩5000	156 × 75 mm	Violet	Kim Il Sung	The birthplace of Kim Il Sung, Mangyongdae-guyok	Arch of Triumph	2002
₩5000	156 × 75 mm	Violet	Kim Il Sung	The birthplace of Kim Il Sung, Mangyongdae-guyok	Arch of Triumph	2006

=== Third won ===
In 2009, another currency reform was initiated to tackle hyperinflation and black market activities. Unlike previous reforms, the 2009 move sparked a nationwide panic when it was announced there would be a two-week waiting period between the withdrawal of the old currency and the introduction of the new currency, coupled with an exchange limit of only 500,000 old won for each person, effectively wiping out savings. The state eventually pulled back on most exchange limits; however, the revaluation proved to be a failure.

Like the coins for this series, some of the denominations were initially printed in 2002 but were never released into circulation, pointing to a planned monetary revaluation much earlier than 2009 that was never carried out.

The current series of banknotes of the third won are issued in denominations of 5, 10, 50, 100, 200, 500, 1,000, 2,000, and 5,000 won. Kim Il Sung is depicted only on the obverse of the highest denomination, with the 100 won note featuring the Magnolia (National Flower) and other notes depicting North Koreans of different professions and various monuments in North Korea. The exchange rate was 100 second won to 1 third won.

Unlike all previous series, these notes were all uniform in dimensions rather than staggered in size from smallest to largest. There are rumors that the original designs for the 1,000 and 2,000 won notes depicted Kim Il Sung and had similar design features to the 5,000 won that were scrapped and destroyed due to counterfeiters or thieves breaking into a bank warehouse and stealing early notes or printing materials, resulting in a total redesign of the two denominations in question.

In 2012, another commemorative series of banknotes was released, this time in the 2002–2009 series but similarly stamped "Great Leader Comrade Kim Il Sung's 100th Birthday". Once again this stamp appeared on all denominations.

In 2018, 1,000 and 2,000 won notes were released with an overprint referencing the 70th anniversary of its independence.

On 25 July 2014, a new 5,000 won note dated 2013 was released into circulation. Instead of depicting the portrait of North Korea's founder Kim Il Sung, the note depicts an image of his birthplace in Mangyondae and on the back the International Friendship Exhibition in Myohyangsan that displays gifts he and his son Kim Jong Il received from foreign leaders. There has been ongoing speculation that this could indicate plans for higher denominations to be released later which would depict Kim Il Sung, Kim Jong Il, or possibly both. However the official reason behind the change was to combat counterfeiters.

2009 and 2013 issues
Value	Dimensions	Main colour	Description			Date of		Ref.
Value	Dimensions	Main colour	Obverse	Reverse	Watermark	printing	issue	Ref.
₩5	145 × 65 mm	Navy blue	Atomic symbol, party members	Hwanggang Hydroelectric Dam	Mongnan	Juche 91 (2002)	30 November 2009	
₩10	145 × 65 mm	Olive green	Korean People's Army Ground Force emblem, Soldiers (Air Force, Navy, Army)	Statue of Victory in Pyongyang	Mongnan	Juche 91 (2002)	30 November 2009	
₩50	145 × 65 mm	Indigo	Flame from the Juche Tower in Pyongyang, man in business suit, man in overalls, woman	Monument to Party Founding in Pyongyang	Mongnan	Juche 91 (2002)	30 November 2009	
₩100	145 × 65 mm	Green	Mongnan (Magnolia sieboldii)	Denomination	Mongnan	Juche 97 (2008)	30 November 2009	
₩200	145 × 65 mm	Violet	Chollima Statue in Pyongyang	Denomination	Mongnan	Juche 97 (2008)	30 November 2009	
₩500	145 × 65 mm	Grey	Arch of Triumph in Pyongyang	Denomination	Mongnan	Juche 97 (2008)	30 November 2009	
₩1,000	145 × 65 mm	Pink	Birthplace of Kim Jong Suk in Hoeryong	Trees on the shore of Samji Lake	Mongnan	Juche 97 (2008)	30 November 2009	
₩2,000	145 × 65 mm	Blue	Alleged birthplace of Kim Jong Il, Jong-il Peak	Paektu Mountain	Mongnan	Juche 97 (2008)	30 November 2009	
₩5,000	145 × 65 mm	Brown	Star, Kim Il Sung, Mongnan (Magnolia sieboldii)	Mangyongdae (alleged birthplace of Kim Il Sung) in Pyongyang	Mongnan	Juche 97 (2008)	30 November 2009	
₩5,000	145 × 65 mm	Brown	Mangyongdae (alleged birthplace of Kim Il Sung) in Pyongyang	International Friendship Exhibition at Mount Myohyang	Mongnan	Juche 102 (2013)	2014	
For table standards, see the banknote specification table.

=== Donpyo emergency currency ===
Lockdowns due to the COVID-19 pandemic have caused shortages in ink and paper used to print regular KPW banknotes, resulting in the issuance in the second half of 2021 of an emergency currency printed with the word donpyo (돈표, "money coupon"). The coupons are in denominations of 5,000 won, printed in red ink, and 50,000 won, printed in green ink, both on white paper of poor quality.

Shortages in regular KPW banknotes after 2020 have also resulted in a premium in their exchange values in the black markets. The donpyo is discounted versus regular banknotes at only 3,800–4,000 KPW, and KPW banknotes have even appreciated versus the US dollar from 8,000 KPW to 5,200 KPW/USD.

== Exchange rates ==
The North Korean won is not traded in the international markets. It is traded in the unofficial black markets and certain department stores at around US$1 = 8,900 KPW in April 2025. It is believed that, due to the COVID-19 pandemic reducing the (mostly illegal) trading activities with the outside world, the valuation of KPW had risen to around $1 = 5,000 KPW in 2021. The North Korean won had experienced fluctuations in its exchange rate throughout 2024. Initially, the KPW saw a dramatic increase against the US dollar, trading at approximately 16,100 KPW per dollar, which represented a substantial rise of about 92% over the previous year. However, by November 2024, the black market value of the KPW had fallen to around 18,000 KPW per dollar, indicating a period of hyperinflation.

In April 2026, the currency continued to depreciate, surpassing 70,000 KPW per US dollar and 8,500 KPW per yuan.

=== Reported prices in market surveys ===
Periodic surveys of informal markets in North Korea can help determine the local purchasing power of the currency. Below are tables of latest reported prices for foreign currencies and essential goods:

Daily NK periodic survey As of 10 May 2026
Item	Price (KPW)
U.S. dollar	▲72,100
Rice (1 kg)	▲32,700

Asiapress periodic survey As of 22 May 2026
Item	Price (KPW)
U.S. dollar	▼67,000
Yuan renminbi	▼8,500
Rice (1 kg)	▼30,000
Corn (1 kg)	▼8,400
Gasoline (1 kg)	80,000
Diesel fuel (1 kg)	▲79,000

== Concurrent use with foreign currencies ==
=== Before 2009 ===
North Korean won are intended exclusively for North Korean citizens, and the Bank of Trade issued a separate currency (or foreign exchange certificates) for visitors, like many other socialist states. However, North Korea made two varieties of foreign exchange certificates, one for visitors from "socialist countries" which were colored red and hence nicknamed "red won", and the other for visitors from "capitalist countries" which were colored blue/green and hence known as "blue won".

For the 1978 banknote series, foreign certificates, called "Pakkundon", meaning "exchangeable money" were implemented by an overstamp and serial number color. This was intended to protect the value of the national currency in North Korea's command economy. These were first released in 1983 in two forms, one for "socialist visitors" which had a red stamp, and one for "capitalist visitors" which had a green stamp. Another series was released in 1986 with either a blue or red Guilloché style stamp. These were issued in all denominations, except for the ₩100 note, presumably because it was assumed by the government that foreign visitors to North Korea would not show proper respect for its depiction of Kim Il Sung. These notes were discontinued in 1988 and replaced with a new series of Pakkundon in all banknote form that was more distinguishable and unmistakable from generic circulation currency.

Variation of the 1978 series
Overstamp	Serial number color	Target users
None	1 red, 1 black	General circulation
Green with Korean text	2 black	Socialist visitors 1983
Red with Korean text	2 red	Capitalist visitors 1983
Red guilloché with numeral	2 red	Capitalist visitors 1983
Blue guilloché with numeral	2 black	Socialist visitors 1986

In 1988, the Bank of Trade (as opposed to the Central Bank) issued two unique series of foreign certificates. They both included 1 chon, 5 chon, 10 chon, 50 chon, ₩1, ₩5, ₩10, and ₩50. The series for "capitalist visitors" was blue-green, while the series for "socialist visitors" was pink. The chon notes had a simple design of patterns and corresponding values, while the socialist won notes depict the International Friendship Exhibition, and the capitalist won notes depict the Chollima Statue.

FECs were used until 1999, then officially abolished in 2002, in favor of visitors paying directly with hard currencies.

=== Since 2009 ===
After the 2009 revaluation, the BBC reported that in some department stores in Pyongyang, the North Korean won was not accepted; the stores take only Japanese yen and U.S. dollars. As of 2018, it had evolved to most North Korean stores accepting U.S. dollars, euros and Chinese yuan/renminbi, with change from transactions primarily returned in renminbi or U.S. dollars.

Foreign visitors (and privileged locals) can buy goods priced in "tied" won using a local debit card, which is credited when exchanging foreign currency at the official bank rate of around 104 won/USD or 130 won/EUR (as of 2012). This card can be used for instance at the famous Pyongyang Department Store No. 1 or at the different stores at the international hotels, where the goods are priced at the tied won rate. This tied won does not exist in the form of bank notes, and is effectively a separate currency and accounting unit for sales involving foreign exchange.

In normal stores and markets, goods are priced in what has been called the "untied" won or free market rate which is represented by regular KPW banknotes. At for instance the Tongil Market and the Kwangbok Department Store (a.k.a. the Chinese Market) there are semi-official exchange agents who will give in regular banknotes around 8,000 KPW/USD or 10,000 KPW/EUR to locals and foreign visitors alike (as of 2012, or 77 times the tied or official rate). The untied KPW is used for prices in normal shops outside restricted state shops/tied won shops.

== See also ==
- Economy of North Korea
- South Korean won
- Korean won

== Notes ==
North Korean won
Preceded by: Korean yen Reason: Division of Korea and moving toward a full sovereign nation from Allied occupation	Currency of North Korea; 18 April 1980 – 12 April 2009; Note: 1st Won: 1945 to 1959; 2nd Won (equivalent to 100 1st Won): 1959 to 2009; 3rd Won (equivalent to 100 2nd Won): 2009 onwards	Succeeded by: Current
