= Belarus–North Korea relations =

- Belarus: North Korea

Belarus and North Korea established bilateral relations in 1992.

== History ==
North Korean President Kim Il Sung visited Minsk, the capital of the Belarusian SSR, in 1984. During the visit, he visited the Minsk Tractor Works and the Brest Fortress.

Diplomatic relations were established on February 3, 1992. Since 2016, North Korea has operated an embassy in Minsk, while Belarus has a consulate in Hamgyong-namdo, despite the fact that the Belarusian government recognizes this as a trade mission and works through other representatives in Moscow (Russia).

In 2020, Belarusian President Alexander Lukashenko suggested improving the relations between North Korea and Belarus, stating that the relations are on an "unreasonably low level". He stated that the relations should be improved with a focus on "medication and food production, professional training and professional development".

In March 2026, President Lukashenko visited North Korea, marking his first state visit to North Korea, as well as the first visit to the country by a Belarusian President. He was greeted by North Korean Vice Premier Kim Tok-hun at the Pyongyang International Airport. Lukashenko visited the Kumsusan Palace of the Sun, where he laid flowers at the resting place of former leaders Kim Il Sung and Kim Jong Il. He then met with North Korean leader Kim Jong Un, and took part in a ceremony at Kim Il Sung Square. During the meeting, the two sides signed a friendship and cooperation treaty.

In October 2026, Belarus opened its embassy in Pyongyang.
