= Chollima Movement =

Socialist movement in North Korea

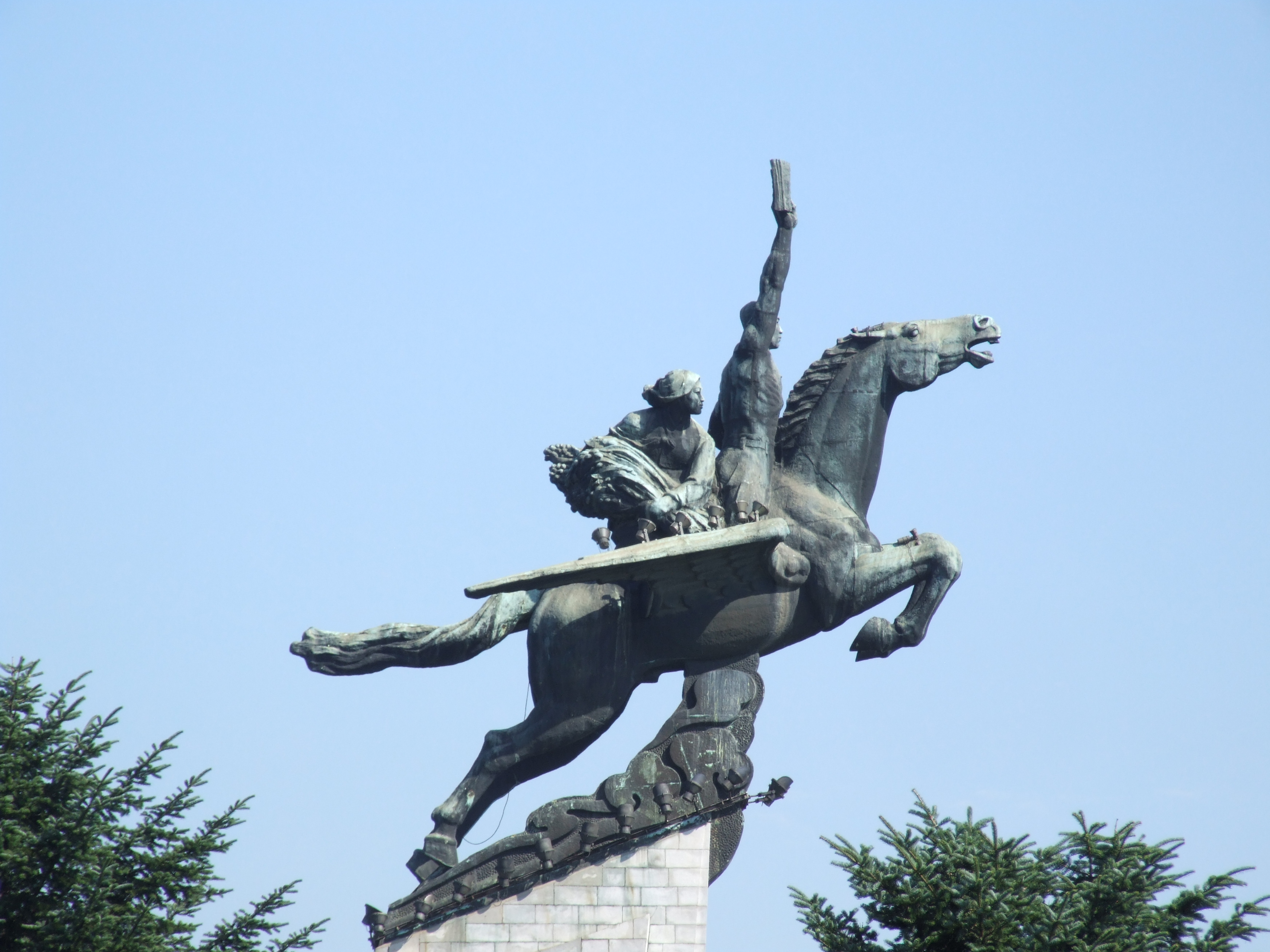
- The Chollima Statue on Mansu Hill in Pyongyang symbolizes the advance of Korean society at the speed of the mythical Chollima.

Korean name
- Hangul: 천리마 운동
- Hanja: 千里馬運動
- RR: Cheollima undong
- MR: Ch'ŏllima undong

The Chollima Movement (Korean: 천리마 운동; Hanja: 千里馬運動) was a state-sponsored Stakhanovite movement in North Korea intended to promote rapid economic development. Launched in 1956 or 1958, (Note: Many sources cite 1956. However, B.R. Myers states that the movement actually started in 1958, but that "North Korean historians backdated the start of this movement to 1956 to make it seem less like a copy of its Chinese counterpart", and that "even conservative South Korean researchers now uncritically accept 1956 as the year the movement began.") the movement emphasized "ideological incentives to work harder" and the personal guidance of Kim Il Sung rather than rational modes of economic management.

In the 1990s, the government attempted to start a second Chollima movement in the wake of the North Korean famine. The Chollima movement is still portrayed in propaganda posters and media.

== Origin ==
The term Chollima originates from the Chinese mythological flying horse. The word Chollima can be translated as "thousand-li horse," referring to its ability to travel 1,000 li (500 kilometers or 310 miles) in a single day. It also was said that no mortal man could ride it. It is known for accomplishing the most difficult tasks and having led heroes to victory. This idea of Chollima was used by Kim Il Sung to energize the workers in North Korea to bring the country out of the rubble of the Korean War to obtain a better life and a more prosperous country in a short amount of time.

Kim Il Sung first introduced the term Chollima in December 1956, shortly before the start of the 1957-61 five-year plan. During this five-year period, North Korea strove to complete a socialist transformation of industry within the country. It worked to nationalize industry and agriculture completely and become largely self-sufficient in producing food, clothing, and housing for all of its citizens. Kim Il Sung started the Chollima movement to motivate hard work for the sake of the nation to achieve the desired outcomes of the five-year plan. At a meeting of the Workers' Party of Korea held in December 1956, Kim Il Sung called on the nation to be more motivated in economic production. He said, "Let us produce more, practice economy, and overfulfill the five-year plan ahead of schedule!" Within four years the aims of the five-year plan were met.

The successes of the Chollima movement were first seen in 1957 when Kim Il Sung called on workers in a factory in the Kangdong County (near Pyongyang) which only had a capacity of 60,000 tons to produce an extra 10,000 tons of steel. The factory, however, was able to produce 120,000 tons, 60,000 tons more than its capacity. This achievement was credited as lighting the torch of the Chollima movement. The term 'Chollima rider' was given to workers who surpassed their targeted goals of production. This title encouraged people to work harder. The North Korean government even started a slogan of 'drink no soup' to make it so workers did not need to use the restrooms as often.

The slogan of 'Let us dash forward in the spirit of Chollima' was adopted to help motivate workers, with the result that successes were reported in many areas of economic activity. North Korea experienced an annual industrial growth of 36.6 percent during the five-year plan.

In 1959, the Chollima Work Team Movement was started. This was a system of socialist competition waged among teams of workers, upholding the Communist lifestyle and working under the lofty socialist ideal "One for all and all for one." "A work team would receive the title of Chollima Work Team by setting a production target high enough to stand out among other work teams in the whole nation and actually attaining the target as assessed competitively under a national evaluation system." If the title was awarded the team and its members would receive honorific items such as Chollima embossed banners, flags and notebooks.

The Chollima Work Team Movement was initiated by Chin Ung-won (진응원) who organized fellow workers on his work team for the goal of achieving production far exceeding the quota assigned to them. With Chin's success and the encouragement from the national government the movement gained rapid massive support and Chin became the ideal Korean worker. The Chollima Work Team Movement gained 178,000 members less than a year and a half after its start.

== Effects ==
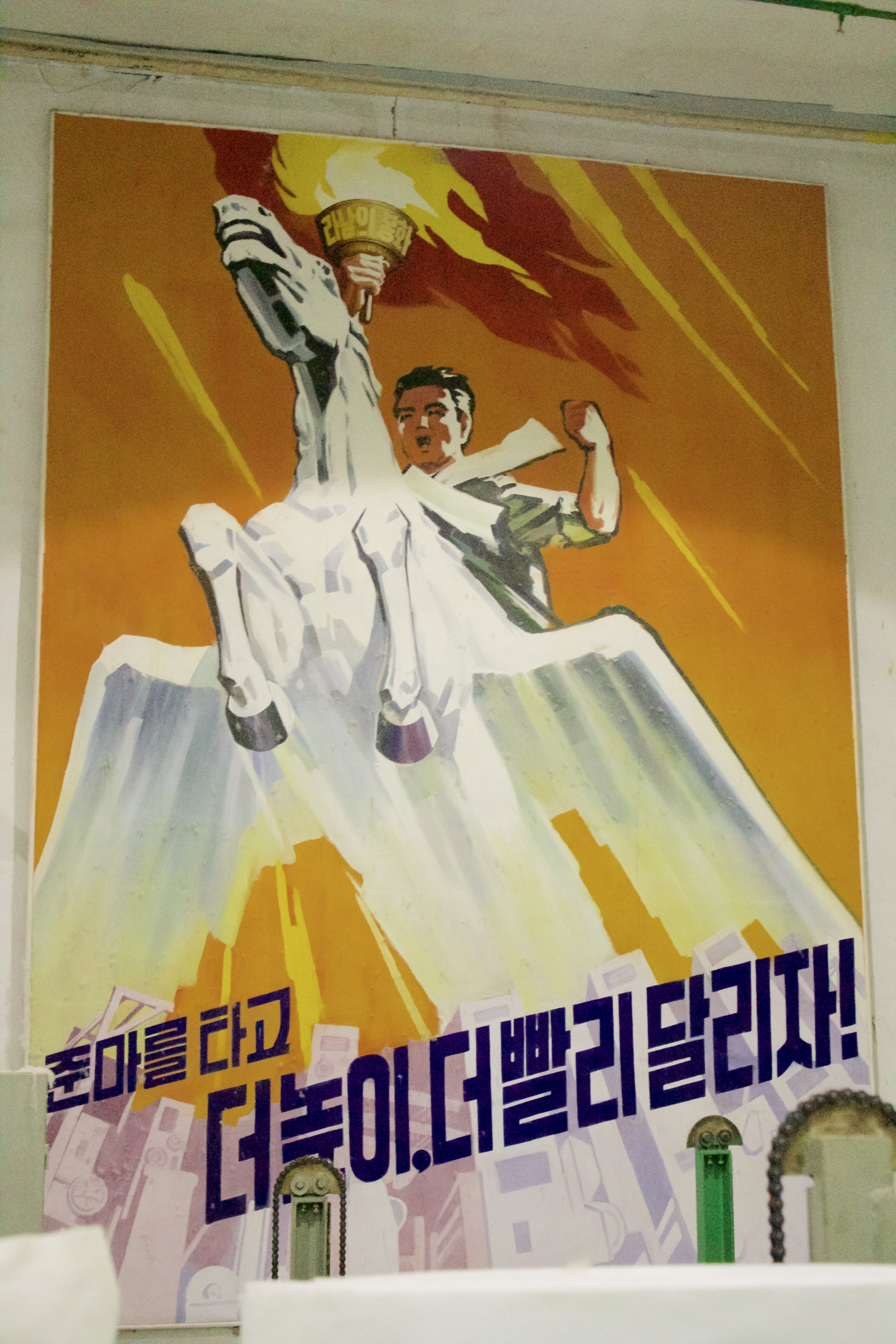
Chollima propaganda poster

This Chollima movement, however, was not able to remain successful indefinitely. The nation obtained the short-term gains in quantity of production but at the cost of lower quality. The economy was distorted as resources were shifted to extensively fund industries while neglecting other needed sectors. Human exhaustion also followed this movement. Little labor remained and resources were stretched to their limits. Economic output began to fall and by 1961 the nation was facing an exhausted labor force. During the mid-1960s, North Korea stopped publishing economic statistics except for percentage increase over previous periods. The Kim Il Sung-directed economy undoubtedly needed alterations. Kim Il Sung however, had no economists who were willing or able to tell him that his economic plans needed to be changed. North Korea has never denounced Chollima or recognized its failures. Even Kim Jong Il gave speeches praising Chollima until his death.

Chollima is still supported and used by the current North Korean regime. The term Chollima and ideas from the early movement still exist in North Korea today. Kim Jong Un has given field guidance to major industrial establishments, exactly as Kim Il Sung had done in the past. North Korean workers have been depicted by the KCNA as being "filled with the will to strive for victory in the cause of building a thriving nation in hearty response to Kim Jong Un's call "Forward towards the final victory!"

In other areas of North Korea society the term "Chollima speed" is still used to depict rapid completion of expectations, referring to both the mythical horse but also to the economic growth in the 1950s. In the late 1990s, North Korea called on a second Chollima movement to help strengthen the nation during a period of massive energy shortages and severe famine.

== Later usage ==
The Chollima Movement was the first of many mass mobilization campaigns in North Korea, and probably the most famous one. Chollima has since become an icon of North Korea. Several statues of the winged horse have been constructed throughout the country. Most significant is the 46-meter high Chollima Statue on Mansu Hill, Pyongyang. This statue was completed in 1961 and was built "to honour the heroism and invincible fighting spirit of the Korean people like the legendary winged horse Chollima that is said to cover a thousand li in a day. Mounted on the winged horse are a worker holding high the "Red Letter" of the Central Committee of the Workers' Party of Korea and a young peasant woman holding a sheaf of rice."

Chollima has been used as a brand name for trucks, buses, and tractors in North Korea. One of the lines on the Pyongyang Metro is called Chollima, as is the North Korean national football team. The winged horse has been depicted on North Korean currency starting in 1978, as well as being seen on postage stamps. The most recent orbital rocket developed by the North Korean space agency, the National Aerospace Development Administration, or NADA, is called Chŏllima 1.

== In popular culture ==
- The protagonist of the 1960 North Korean short story "A Letter from Haeju-Hasong" is depicted as an exemplary Chollima Rider.
- The song "Chollima on the Wing" was created to stir popular support for the Chollima Movement.

== See also ==
- 20x10 Policy
- Ch'ŏngsan-ni Method
- Great Leap Forward
- Juche
- Economy of North Korea
- Politics of North Korea
- Saemaeul movement
- Stakhanovite movement
