= Grand People's Study House =

Library in Pyongyang, North Korea

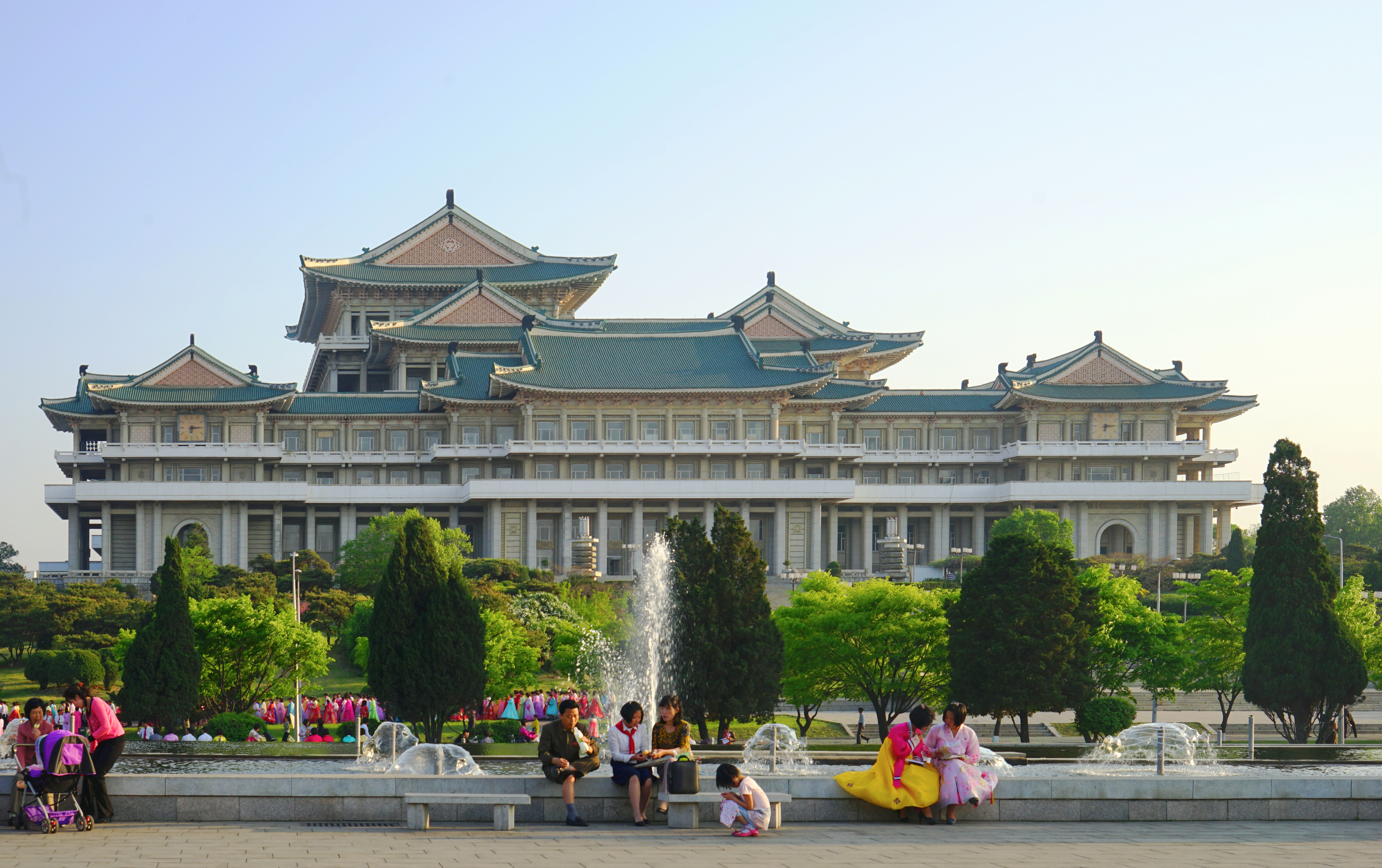
- Study House in May 2015
- 39°01′13″N 125°44′59″E
- Location: Pyongyang, North Korea
- Type: Public
- Established: 1 April 1982 (44 years ago)
- Architect: Kim Jong Il

Other information
- Website: Official website
- Building details

General information
- Architectural style: Neo-traditional Korean

Korean name
- Hangul: 인민대학습당
- Hanja: 人民大學習堂
- RR: Inmin daehakseupdang
- MR: Inmin taehaksŭptang

The Grand People's Study House (Note: formerly known as the Pyongyang City Library, National Central Library, and the Central Library) (Korean: 인민대학습당) is the national library of North Korea, located in the capital city of Pyongyang. The library was built in 1982 in honour of the Supreme Leader Kim Il Sung's 70th birthday. It is located in the centre of the capital, situated on Kim Il Sung Square by the banks of the Taedong River and opposite the Juche Tower. Both landmarks establish a connection between the people and the Juche ideology.

The library opened as the Pyongyang City Library on 13 November 1945, but was destroyed during the Korean War, reopening in 1954. The library is the centre of Juche studies, but lectures and materials concerning other topics, as well as foreign publications, can also be found there. Materials are strictly accessible to librarians and staff, but people can still search the online or print catalogues to find what they would like to borrow. A formal communication from the library is issued to the offender's employer if a borrowed item is not returned on time.

== History ==
The Grand People's Study House, originally known as the Pyongyang City Library, opened on 13 November 1945, and was recognised by the North Korean government the following year as the National Central Library. After the library was destroyed during the Korean War, the first Supreme Leader of North Korea, Kim Il Sung, requested that it be rebuilt, and the library reopened as the National Central Library on 15 August 1954. In 1973, the library was again renamed the Central Library, and renamed once more as the Grand People's Study House in 1982, after the people of North Korea and the Juche philosophy of "study while working", a principle which advances their understanding of Juche, socialism, and the Kim family.

During the Cold War, the Soviet Union provided financial assistance to North Korea, allowing numerous Eastern European-style buildings to be built in Pyongyang. Believing that the country had become too heavily influenced by other cultures, Kim Il Sung advocated for North Korean-style architecture, which involved reviving elements of traditional Korean infrastructure, a practise that the North Korean government deemed essential for socialist buildings. Among the establishments built in this style of architecture was the Grand People's Study House. Construction spanned 21 months; the official guide states that Kim Il Sung had previously planned to construct a major structure in central Pyongyang as part of a strategy to renovate the area. The library was opened on 1 April 1982, in part to celebrate Kim Il Sung's 70th birthday.

== Features ==
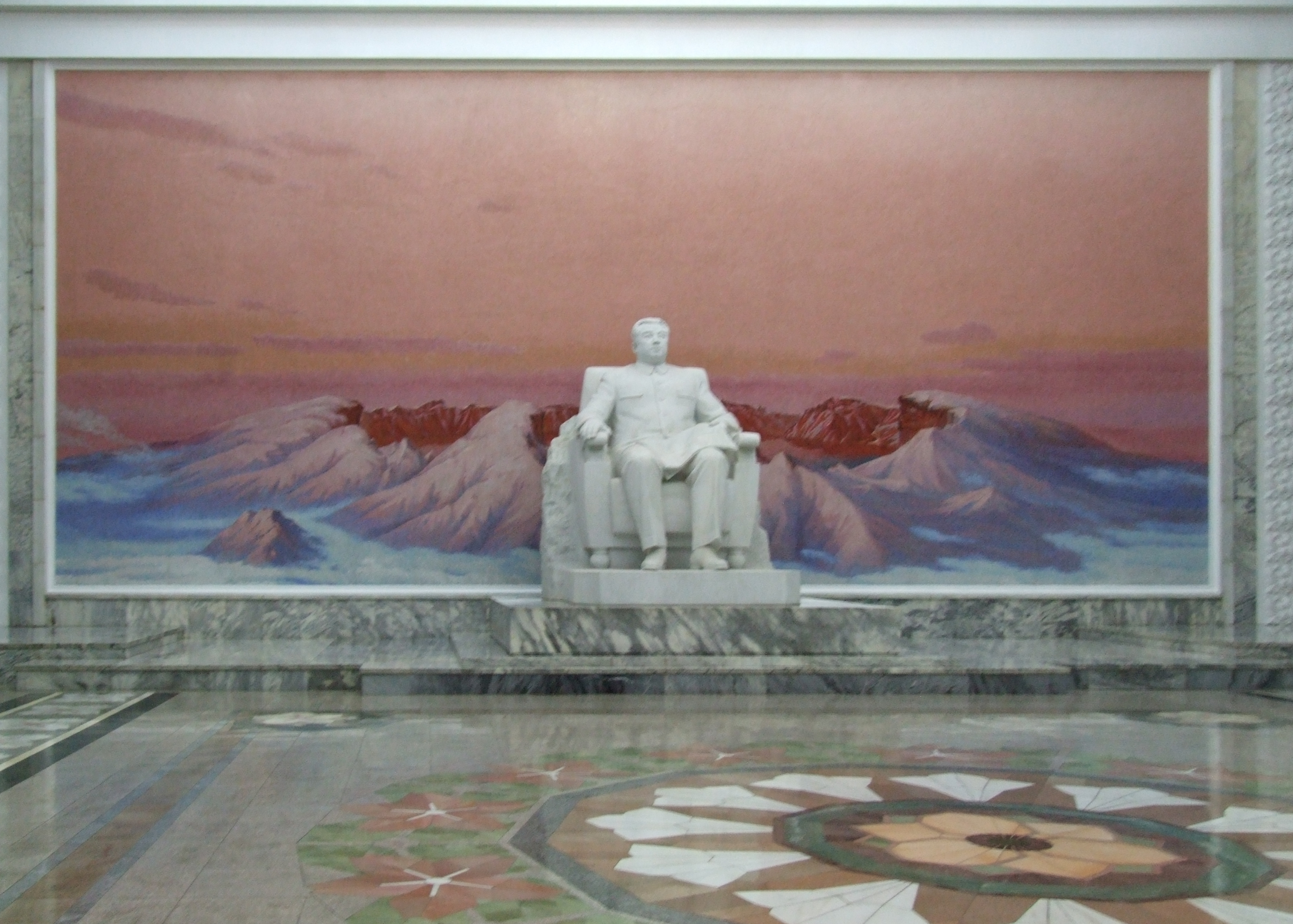
Entrance area containing Kim Il Sung statue. Photo taken in August 2012

The Grand People's Study House is located in the Central District of Pyongyang, at the Kim Il Sung Square, which also houses the Supreme People's Assembly and the Korean Art Gallery. The Juche Tower is situated on the east bank of the Taedong River, directly opposite Kim Il Sung Square on the west bank. According to the Korean Central News Agency, in January 2023, a smaller replica of the library was built in the municipal city of Sinuiju, whose central square was renovated to resemble the Kim Il Sung Square.

The library is one of the few buildings in Pyongyang that was constructed in a neo-traditional Korean style, having been built to resemble a chosŏnjip – a traditional Korean house – at the insistence of Kim Il Sung's successor, Kim Jong Il. The library towers 10 storeys tall with a total floor space of 100,000 square metres (1,100,000 sq ft) and 600 rooms. Its roof is adorned with traditional, green-colored tiles. Outside of the library, and in each room and atrium, portraits of Kim Il Sung and Kim Jong Il are hung, which, according to information and library scientist Marc Kosciejew, remind visitors of the country's surveillance. The library's interior is also decorated with chandeliers and paintings of Mount Paektu, before which statues of Kim Il Sung are positioned.

=== Collection ===
According to North Korean sources, the Grand People's Study House can house up to 30 million books. The collection includes around 10,800 documents written by Kim Il Sung, including his "on-the-spot guidance", as well as the writings of Kim Jong Il, but the total collection size is not publicly known. Historical documents pertaining to the Joseon Dynasty were found on the third and fifth floors of the library. The library also has a music archive containing folk and revolutionary songs on CDs. Materials are accessible to librarians and staff, but library visitors need to search the online or print catalogues to find what they would like to borrow and place a request. Resources are provided in Korean, English, French, Russian, German, Chinese and Japanese. Foreign publications, such as Harry Potter and Gone with the Wind, are also available. Kosciejew says that when the borrowing period expires for library material, the borrower's employer reminds them to return the item right away.

Since the 1990s, the Asia Foundation, under its Books for Asia programme, has annually donated over 10,000 books to the Grand People's Study House, Kim Il Sung University, and the Pyongyang University of Foreign Studies. According to representative Peter Beck, the donations cement the idea that "information is power". As reported by Korean Central Television, Kim Jong Il had been a regular donor to the library in 2007, sending in science and technology CDs, the Guinness Book of World Records, a sound effects design guide, architectural environmental acoustics, and around 250 books related to agriculture.

=== Operation ===
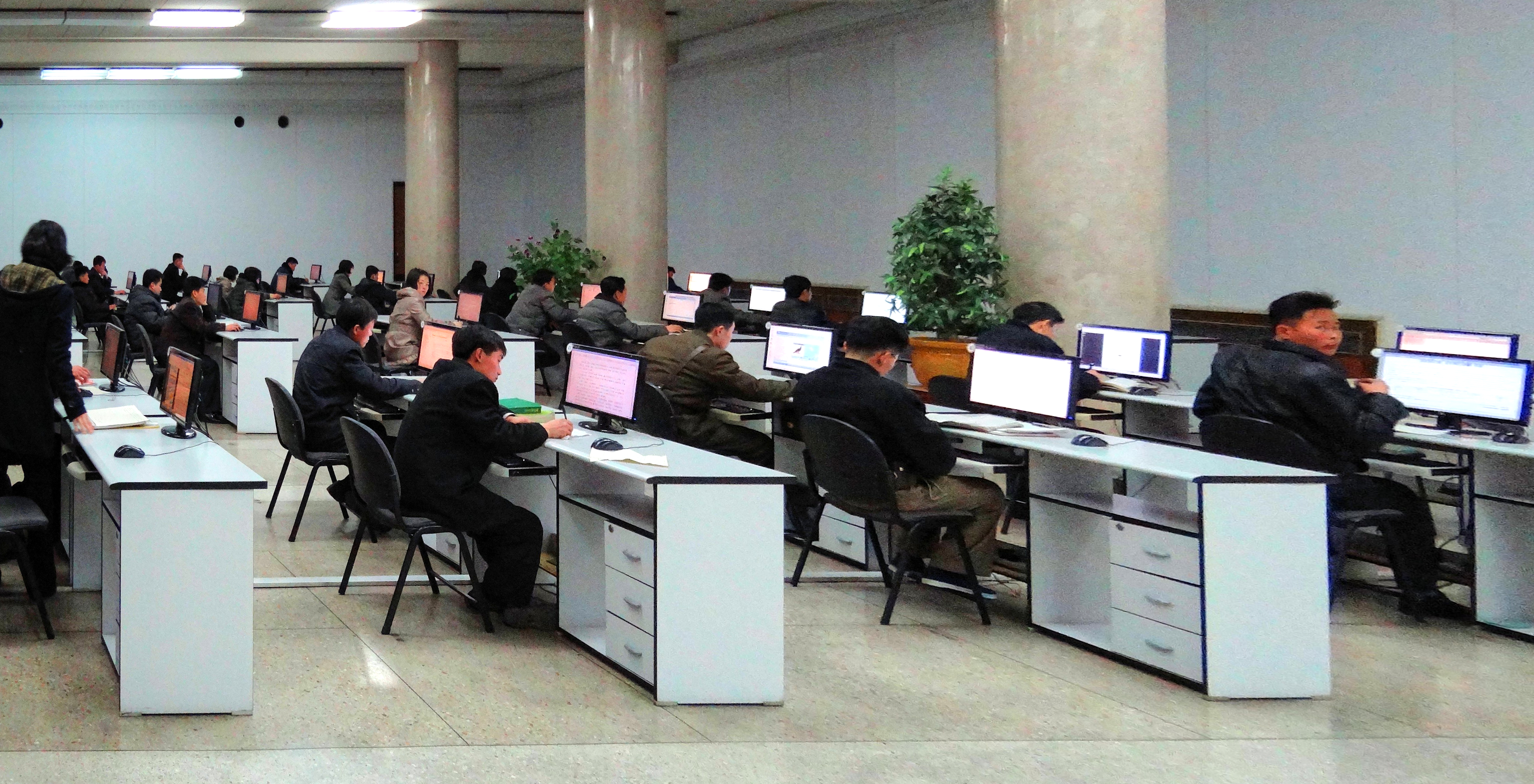
A computer study room at the Grand People's Study House. Photo taken in March 2014. The computers give access to the North Korean intranet, not the worldwide Internet.

According to Marc Kosciejew, the organisation of the staff working at the Grand People's Study House is hierarchical, with the president at its apex. The president gives orders to the national librarians, assigning each of them specific disciplines or subject areas, and determining their collections. Each national librarian is responsible for all policies related to their area of expertise. Additionally, each librarian is classified into one of six grades based on their performance on a library certification exam. Some librarians are given the titles "meritorious" or "people's", requiring 15 and 20 years of working at the Grand People's Study House, respectively. In 2001, the Vice President was Choi Gwang-ryeol, and as of 2019, the library curator is Choi Heui-jung.

=== Courses and topics ===
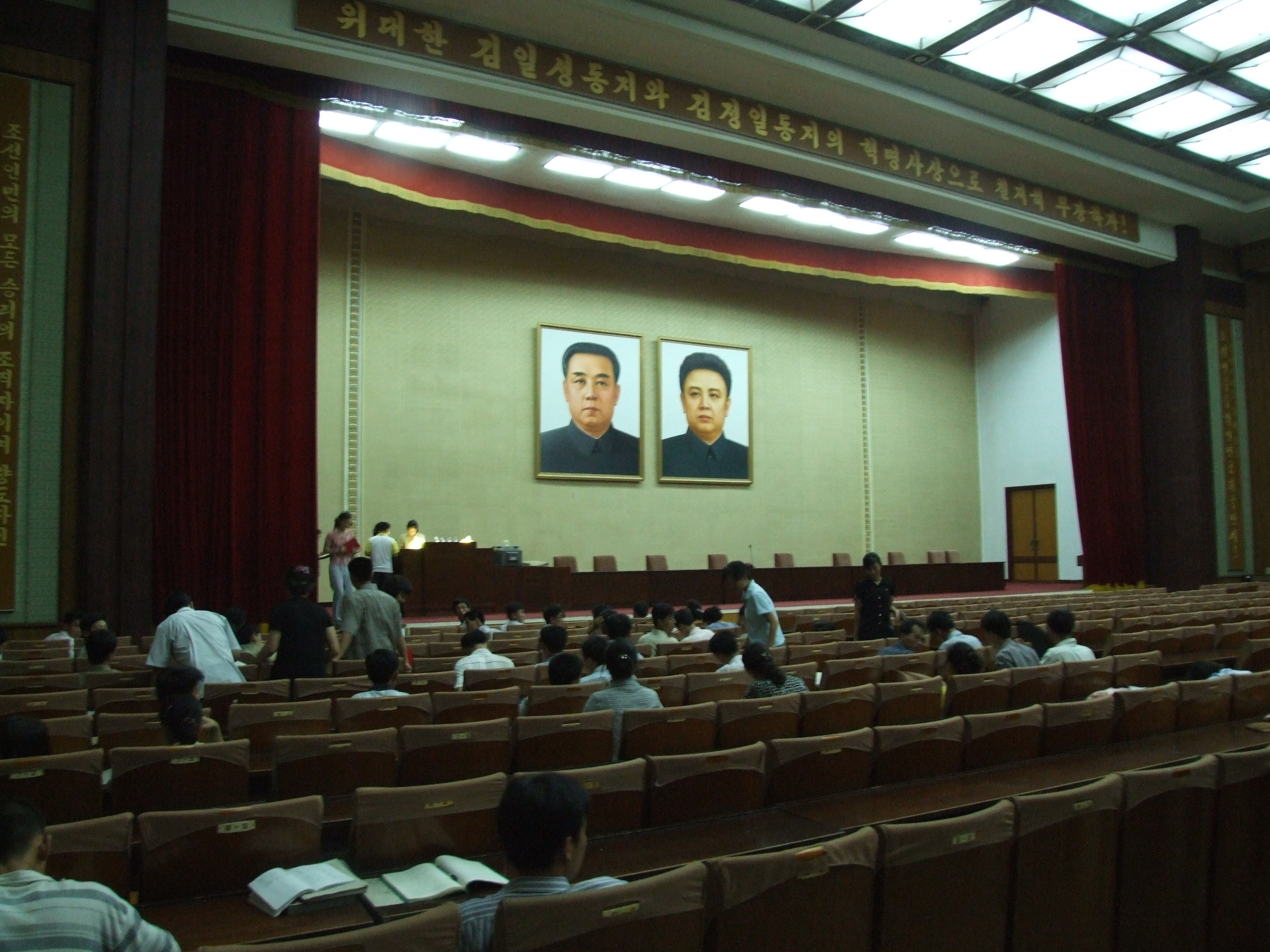
Lecture hall. Photo taken in August 2012

North Korea's Library Law establishes libraries as essential for promoting ideologies, enhancing technology and culture, supplying new science and technology, and organising social learning. As such, lectures on a variety of subjects take place at the Grand People's Study House. American evangelist Billy Graham gave a talk in the library in 1994, when religious practises were often harshly punished in North Korea, and after the 2018 North Korea–United States Singapore Summit, Choson Exchange coordinator Ian Bennett led a three-day-long entrepreneurship workshop at the library. In July 2024, according to the South Korean Ministry of Unification, students studying abroad were ordered to return to North Korea for the first time in five years to resume ideological education. Such education, as reported by South Korean news outlets, included a planned political training session related to Kim Jong Un at the library, which was scheduled to occur later that month.

Alongside Juche – the national philosophy of North Korea that focuses on self-reliance, computer education is compulsory in North Korea, making them the two most popular subjects studied by military officers and university students at the Grand People's Study House. People with computer-related office jobs, such as librarians, are seen in high regard, and programming languages like MATLAB have been taught in the library. In 2001, The Chosun Ilbo reported that computer-related books were the second-most popular book topic for loaning at the library. In 1991, a majority of the equipment in the Grand People's Study House were Japanese products, such as those by Sony and Hitachi. In 2006, digital libraries began opening throughout North Korea under Kim Jong Un's interest in science and technology. Of these electronic libraries, the Pyongyang Sci-Tech Complex, which opened in 2016, is expected to rival the Grand People's Study House.

North Koreans frequently choose to study English; one tourist working for the Daily NK points out that it is part of the efforts "to develop the country" or to do trade with other countries, and a November 2009 article in Homeland, a pro-North Korean magazine based in Japan, reported that English is the most popular language North Koreans choose to study, followed by Chinese and Russian. German and Japanese courses have also been provided in the Grand People's Study House.

== Significance and reception ==
The Grand People's Study House's reported popularity supports its position as the national library of North Korea; on 28 January 1989, the Pyongyang Broadcasting Station reported that since the library's inception, over 10 million people have visited the Grand People's Study House annually. As of 2025, up to 700 people attend each session of the library's Chinese courses, as noted on the Chinese Embassy's website following Wang Yajun's visit to the library. Moreover, the Study House is featured on the back of the 5-won bill, and the library is a popular destination for dates within the country.

In his two-part account of North Korean libraries, Marc Kosciejew uses the conceptual framework of "library-as-place", illuminating its significance in the lives of North Koreans as both a place of cult of personality and governmental control, as well as an opportunity for cultural and social gatherings. The library further helps reinforce the Juche mindset by strictly controlling information and events that are available to the public, but the fact that some information is made available is notable among the country.

The library, as well as its patrons, follow Kim Il Sung's "study while working" mindset. For major media coverage, the library is often seen in speeches, military and nuclear parades, and performances celebrating national holidays. During the memorial service commemorating the death of Kim Jong Il, Kim Jong Un was seen on the balcony of the library accompanied by high-ranking military officials and close relatives.

== See also ==
- List of national and state libraries
