= Qianlima =

Mythical horse in Chinese mythology

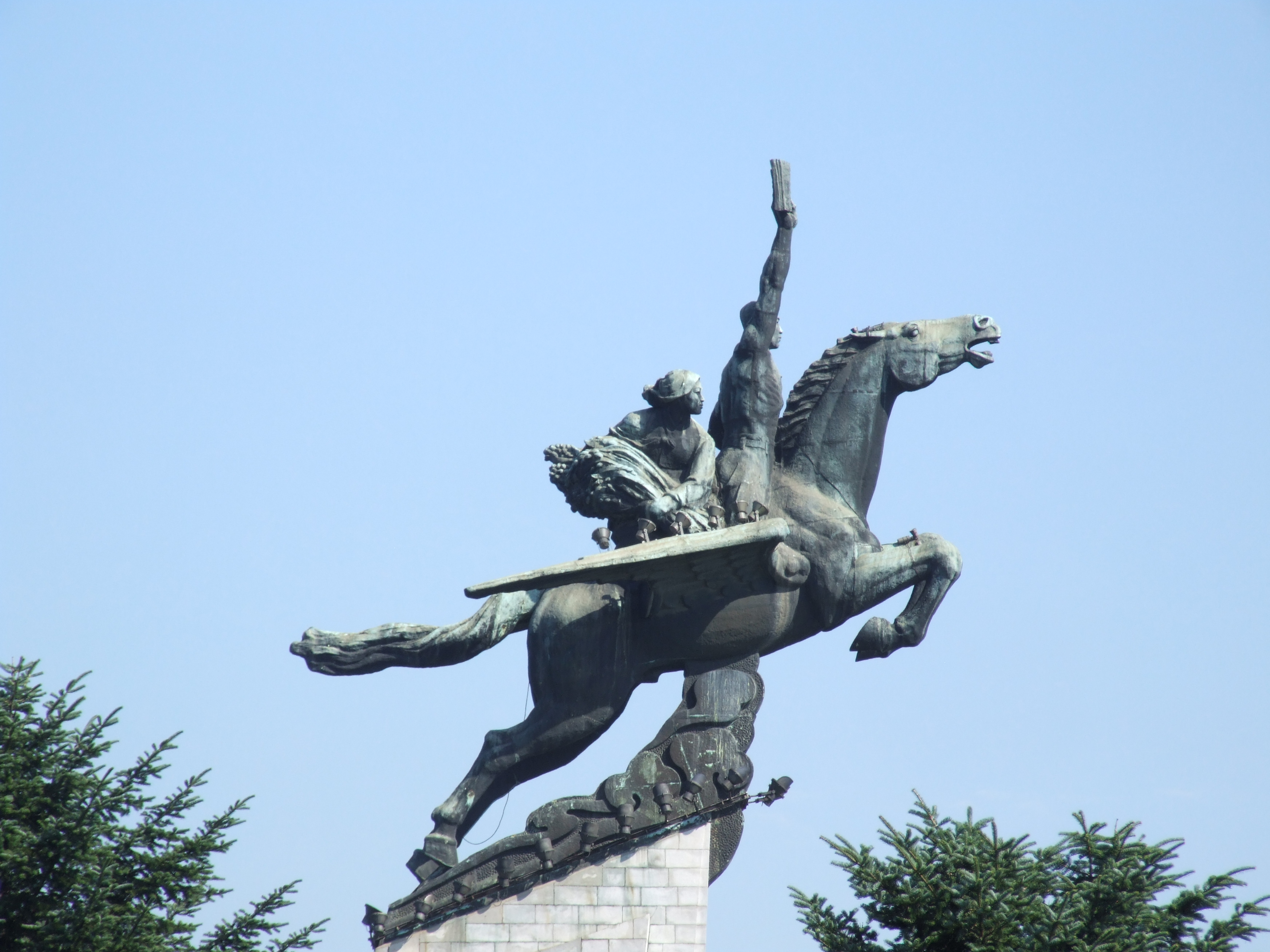
- The Chollima Statue in Pyongyang

Chinese name
- Traditional Chinese: 千里馬
- Simplified Chinese: 千里马
- Literal meaning: thousand li horse
Transcriptions
Standard Mandarin
- Hanyu Pinyin: qiānlǐmǎ
- Wade–Giles: chʻien^{1}-li^{3}-ma^{3}
- IPA: [tɕʰjɛ́nlǐmà]

Vietnamese name
- Vietnamese alphabet: thiên lý mã
- Hán-Nôm: 千里馬

Korean name
- Chosŏn'gŭl: 천리마
- Hancha: 千里馬
Transcriptions
- Revised Romanization: cheollima
- McCune–Reischauer: ch'ŏllima

Japanese name
- Kanji: 千里馬
- Kana: せんりま チョンリマ
Transcriptions
- Romanization: senrima chonrima

The qianlima ([tɕʰjɛ́nlǐmà]; also chollima or cheollima in Korean, and senrima in Japanese; lit. 'thousand-li horse') is a mythical horse that originates from the Chinese classics and is commonly portrayed in East Asian mythology. The winged horse is said to be too swift and elegant to be mounted by any mortal man and is named after its ability to travel one thousand li in a single day.

Since the 3rd century BCE, the qianlima was used as a metaphor for exceptionally talented people and animals, such as Red Hare. The chollima is an important symbol in North Korea and is the namesake of the Chollima Movement.

== China ==
Beginning around the 3rd century BCE, Chinese classics mention Bole, a mythological horse-tamer, as an exemplar of horse judging. Bole is frequently associated with the fabled qianlima (千里馬; "thousand-li horse"), which was supposedly able to gallop one thousand li (approximately 400 km) in a single day (e.g. Red Hare, sweats blood horse). Qianlima was a literary Chinese word for people with latent talent and ability; and Spring suggests, "For centuries of Chinese history, horses had been considered animals capable of performing feats requiring exceptional strength and endurance. Possibly it is for this reason that from early times horses have been used allegorically to represent extraordinary people." Bole recognizing a qianlima was a metaphor for a wise ruler selecting talented shi "scholar-officials". Thus, "Geniuses in obscurity were called thousand li horses who had not yet met their [Bole]".

== Japan ==
Keitoku Senrima (Kim Ge-dok), a professional middleweight boxer in Japan, uses the stage name "Senrima" (the Japanese form of Qianlima/Chollima) to reference North Korea's Chollima campaigns and thereby express his Zainichi Korean heritage.

== North Korea ==
The chollima is an important national symbol of North Korea. It is used as the nickname of its national association football team and also as the name of a rocket. The state also gave the name to the Chollima Movement, which promoted fast economic development, modeled after the Chinese Great Leap Forward. After the Korean War, the country required rebuilding to function again. In order to expedite the construction, Kim Il Sung devised the slogan "rush at the speed of chollima". The North Korean film industry is sometimes referred to as "Chollywood", a portmanteau of "chollima" and "Hollywood". In Pyongyang, the 46-meter-tall Chollima Statue stands next to the Mansu Hill Grand Monument.

In cyber security, CrowdStrike utilises a naming convention wherein attributed nation-state hacker groups/advanced persistent threats are named after the national animal of their nation of origin. Consequently, several major North Korean hacker groups are named after the Chollima, such as Labyrinth Chollima, Velvet Chollima, or Richochet Chollima.

== See also ==
- Horse in Chinese mythology
- Buraq
- Longma
- Pegasus
- Tianma
- Tulpar
