= Korean won =

Korean won (modern symbol ₩) may refer to:

== Currencies in use ==
- South Korean won (KRW)
- North Korean won (KPW)

== Historical currencies ==
- Korean Empire won (1900–1910)
- South Korean won (1945–1953)
- South Korean hwan (1953–1962)
- Won of the Red Army Command, 1945–1947 currency in northern Korea under the Soviet Civil Administration
