= Tongil Market =

Marketplace in Pyongyang, North Korea

- Location: Tongil Street; Pyongyang, North Korea; 38°58′52″N 125°43′59″E
- Opening date: 1 September 2003
- Environment: Indoor market
- Goods sold: Agricultural produce, fish, food, clothes, appliances
- Number of tenants: 2,200
- Total retail floor area: 6,000 square metres (65,000 sq ft)
- Parking: For cars and bikes
- Interactive map of Tongil Market

- Tongil Market
- Hangul: 통일시장
- Hanja: 統一市場
- Lit.: Unification Market
- RR: Tongil sijang
- MR: T'ongil sijang

The Tongil Market (Korean: 통일시장), or Unification Market, is a marketplace in Pyongyang, North Korea. It is the largest and best-known marketplace in the city. The two-story indoor market houses some 2,200 vendors selling agricultural produce, fish, food, clothes, and appliances, including luxury and counterfeit products. There are services, such as foreign exchange and food courts, in each of three sections that comprise the marketplace. The market was opened in 2003 when North Korean leader Kim Jong-il ordered that farmers' markets should be consolidated into larger units.

Unlike most other markets in the country, the Tongil Market is clearly visible from the street, and is also accessible by tourists. In addition to tourists, the market caters to the elites of Pyongyang, as prices of certain items are high. An unofficial market has existed just next to it.

== History ==
In March 2003, Kim Jong-il, the leader of North Korea, instructed that farmers' markets should be consolidated into larger units. On 3 May, the Cabinet of North Korea promulgated Directive 24, which stated (Article 2) that the Tongil Market shall be established "as an example for the whole country." Tongil Market was opened on 1 September. Since 2006, North Korea has restricted foreigners' access to markets, but the Tongil Market has remained open to them. The Tongil Market, along with other large official markets in Pyongyang, was temporarily closed down for a few weeks in 2009, leaving residents dependent on the informal economy.

== Products and services ==
Tongil Market is located in Pyongyang, near Rangrang Station, just off Tongil Street in a suburb of southern Pyongyang.

Tongil Market is the largest and best-known marketplace in Pyongyang. It has 1,500 booths in an area of more than 6,000 square metres (65,000 sq ft). It is a covered market, and, unlike most other markets in the country, in two stories. The market has about 2,200 vendors, who pay an initial registration fee equivalent of $30 and a fixed fee every time they use their stall. The market consists of three areas: agricultural produce and fish, food and clothes, and metal utensils and appliances. TV sets, exotic foods like, quail and turkey, and imported fruit like bananas and pineapples are also on sale. Counterfeit products, including of Western perfumes, are sold. Many women work as peddlers. Each area has an office and currency exchange booth – both on the upper floor – as well as a food court attached to it. The foreign exchange booths, run by the state-owned Foreign Trade Bank of the Democratic People's Republic of Korea, offer exchange at the normal rate and are open intermittently. There is parking for both cars and bikes.

The market is busy with customers. Prices are in North Korean won and haggling is commonplace. Some prices on par with those in Chinese markets, with vegetables being somewhat more expensive but seafood and clothes generally cheaper. The prices are, however, not particularly cheap in relation to average incomes of North Koreans. For instance, spinach costs 1,000 won at the Tongil Market, fifty times as much as its 20-won price tag at rural markets in North Korea. Because the market is well-stocked, it has been suspected of being a "showpiece", but in fact its wares are comparable to other markets in the country. Its customer base is, however, mainly foreign visitors and domestic elites. The market is open to foreign visitors, and many embassies in Pyongyang use it for shopping. Photography is not allowed. One foreigner, Pamela Bryant, a visiting professor at Pyongyang University of Science and Technology, relates how one of her faculty members broke the rule resulting in the entire faculty being banned from the market for three months.

Unlike most other markets, the Tongil Market is clearly visible from the street with its distinct white walls and blue roof. The Tongil Market is an official one, in contrast to North Korea's informal markets (Jangmadang). There has however been an unofficial "frog market" near it, so named because vendors would "jump" like frogs if authorities showed up. According to a vendor interviewed by Daily NK, "The size of a street-stand is approximately 50cm by 50cm [20 in × 20 in] large. There are also about 2,000 people selling outside of the market... The Tongil Market usually consists of people from the Tongil Street, so merchants from the other regions cannot do business there. In the Tongil Market alone, there are around 8,000 people [doing business]. Because the market is so large, the cadres from the other regions frequently come to buy goods."

== See also ==
- Economy of North Korea
