= Kim Il Sung Square =

City square in Pyongyang, North Korea

- Public square
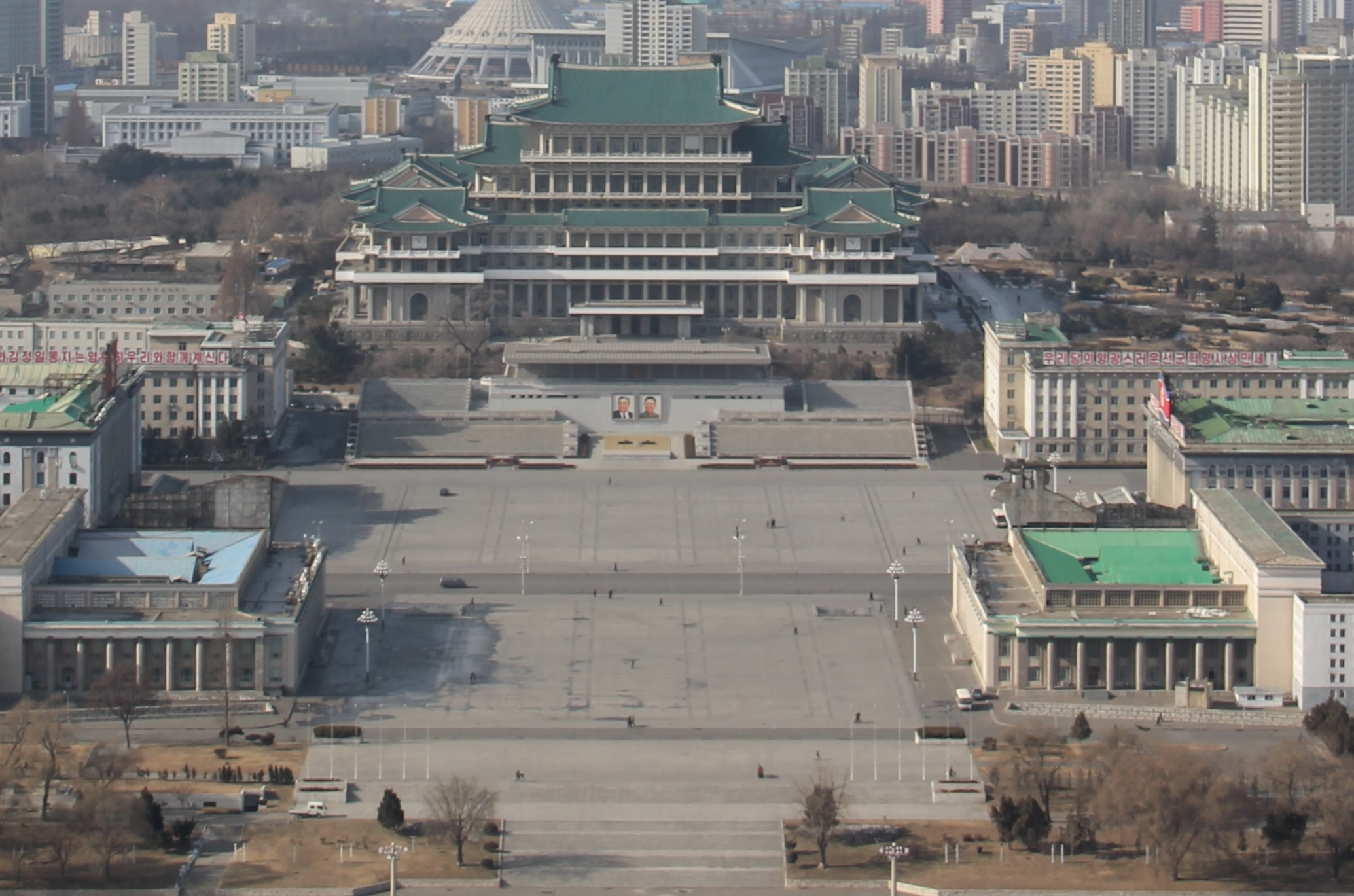
- The square in 2014
- Opened: August 1954
- Area: 75,000 square meters (810,000 ft^{2})
- Surface: concrete
- Dedicated to: Kim Il Sung
- Owner: City of Pyongyang
- Location: Taedongmun-dong, Chung-guyok, Pyongyang
- Interactive map of Kim Il Sung Square
- Coordinates: 39.01953°N 125.75247°E

Korean name
- Hangul: 김일성광장
- Hanja: 金日成廣場
- RR: Gim Ilseong gwangjang
- MR: Kim Ilsŏng kwangjang

Kim Il Sung Square (Korean: 김일성광장) is a large city square in the Central District of Pyongyang, North Korea, and is named after the country's founding leader, Kim Il Sung. The square was constructed in 1954 according to a master plan for reconstructing the capital after the destruction of the Korean War. It was opened in August 1954. The square is located on the foot of the Namsan Hill, west bank of the Taedong River, directly opposite the Juche Tower on the other side of the river. It is the 37th largest square in the world, having an area of about 75,000 square metres (810,000 sq ft), which can accommodate a rally of more than 100,000 people. The square has great cultural significance, as it is a common gathering place for concerts, rallies, dances, and military parades, and is often featured in media concerning North Korea.

== Overview ==
The Kim Il Sung Square is at the center of Pyongyang on the west bank of the Taedong River. It is similar in form and design to the Tiananmen Square in Beijing and is used for the same purposes. Since the completion of the square, multiple parades have been held to commemorate different events and to show the world North Korea's military capabilities. The Kim Il Sung Square is architecturally more refined with its dramatic riverside setting. If an observer stands in the square, the Tower of the Juche Idea on the opposite bank appears to be located directly towards the west end of the square, although it is actually across the Taedong River, as with the Workers' Party Monument and the Mansudae Grand Monument. This optical effect is created because the square is a few meters lower in the center when compared to the side near the Taedong River. Surrounding the square are a number of government buildings, with the Great People's Study House located at the east end of the square. At the south end are two flag poles which were installed in 2013 for use in national events.

Under the square, there is a department store selling products such as toys.

Kim Il Sung Square is the "kilometre zero" of North Korea from where all national road distances are measured.

== History ==
Portraits of Karl Marx and Vladimir Lenin once hung on one of the buildings surrounding the square, but were taken down sometime in 2012. During Kim Jong Il's rule, only Kim Il Sung hung on these buildings, although his portrait on the building below the flag of the DPRK was removed. When Kim Jong Il died, his portrait was added to the buildings in commemoration.

After the Singapore Trump-Kim summit in 2018, North Korea removed the anti-American imperialism propaganda in Kim Il Sung Square. Also, North Korea cancelled the annual 'anti-US' rally event in 2018. In 2017, the protests that were held in Kim Il Sung Square were supposedly attended by 100,000 people. Furthermore, North Korea issued special anti-US postage stamps in 2017.

The old ceremonial grandstand on the square's south side was renovated in 2020, with a second phase that took place in 2025, which even expanded to the wider complex. There are plans for a square renovation, which would enthral the transfer to the new Hwasong district of the government facilities and museums located in the square complex to give way to a massive expansion of its open space.

== Gallery ==
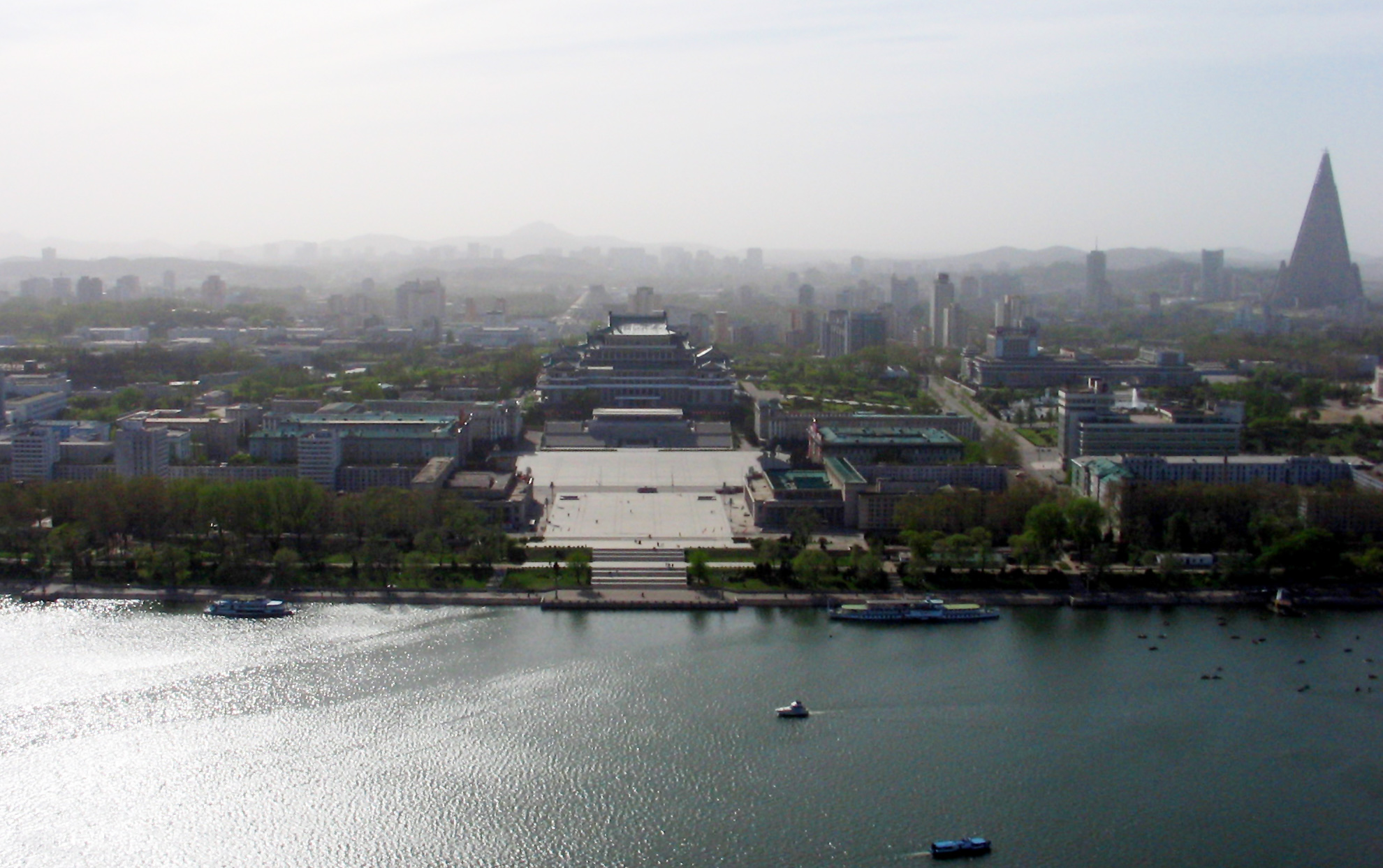
Pyongyang as seen from the Juche Tower, facing west across the Taedong River. The large square in the center is Kim Il Sung Square; the large building behind it is the Grand People's Study House.

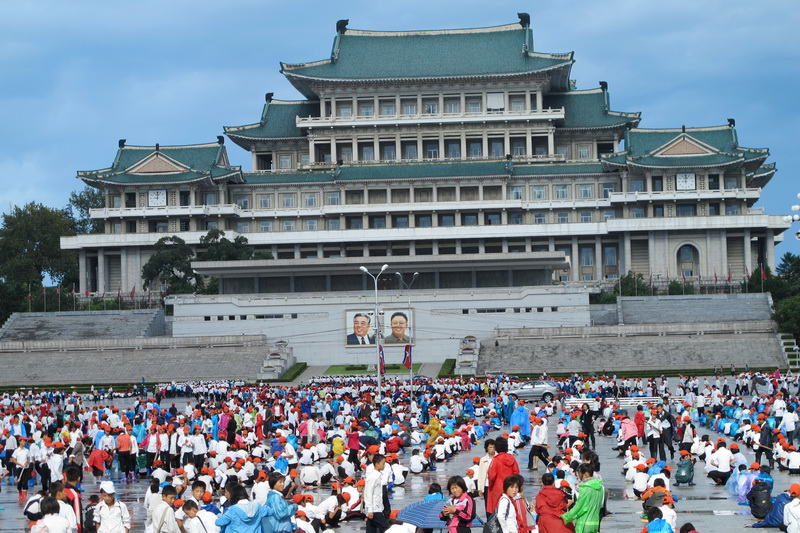
The Kim Il Sung square, with the Grand People's Study House, also known as the National Library of North Korea.

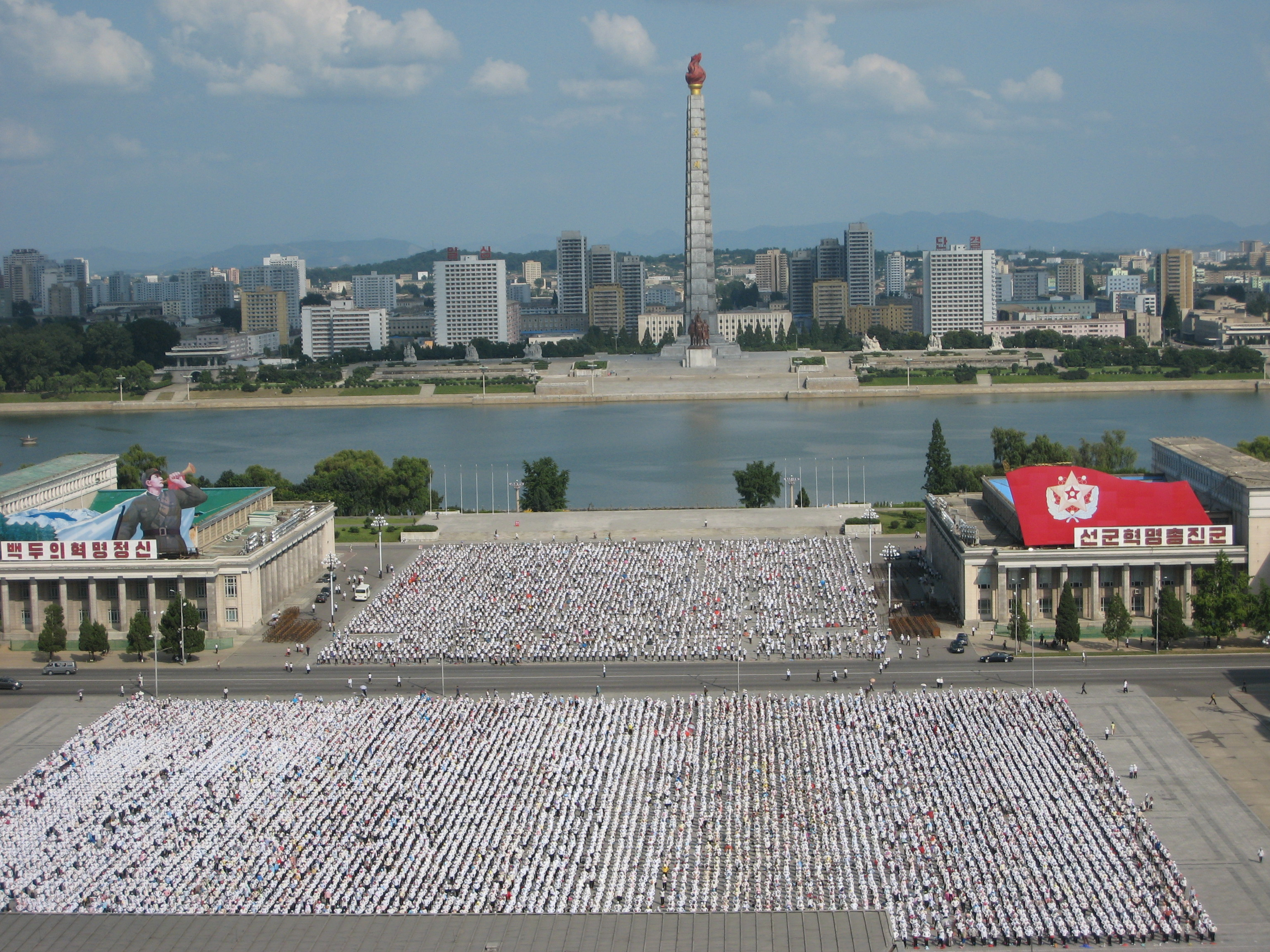
The Kim Il Sung Square and the Tower of Juche Idea seen from the Grand People's Study House.

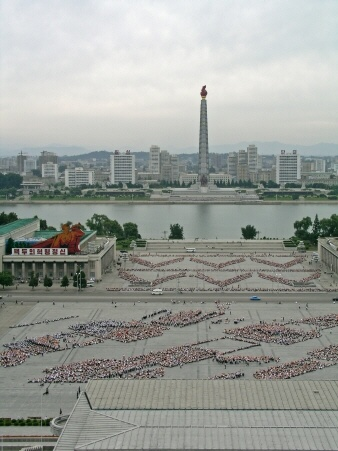
The Kim Il Sung square, as viewed from the Study Hall to the Juche Tower

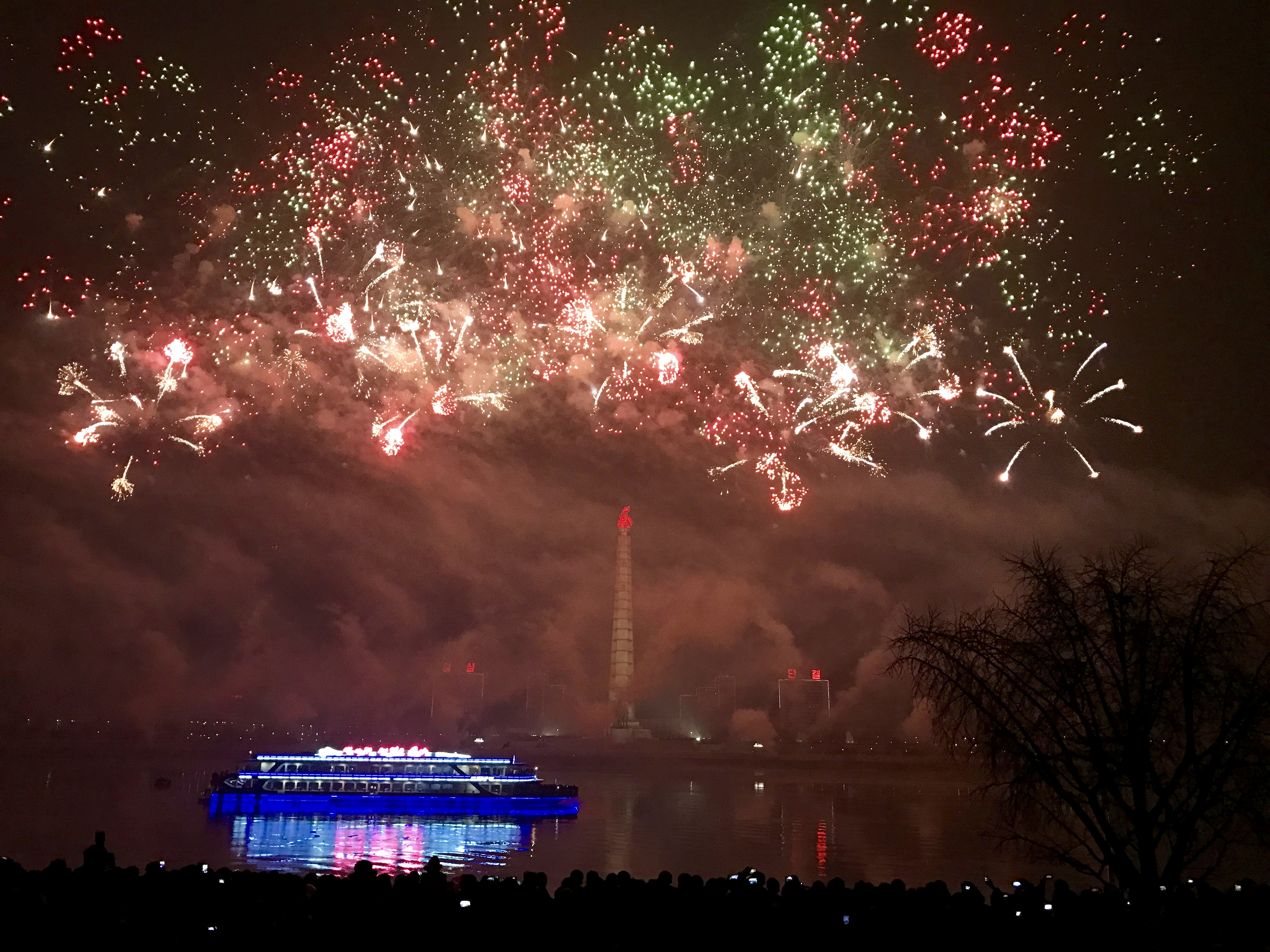
New Year fireworks at Kim Il Sung Square, January 2017.

North Korean female soldiers training goose-steps through Kim Il Sung Square while rehearsing for the Day of the Foundation of the Republic parade in 2011.

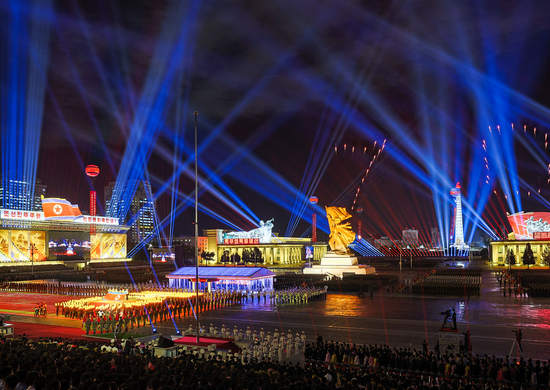
Parade in honor of the 70th anniversary of the end of the Korean War, held on 27 July 2023.

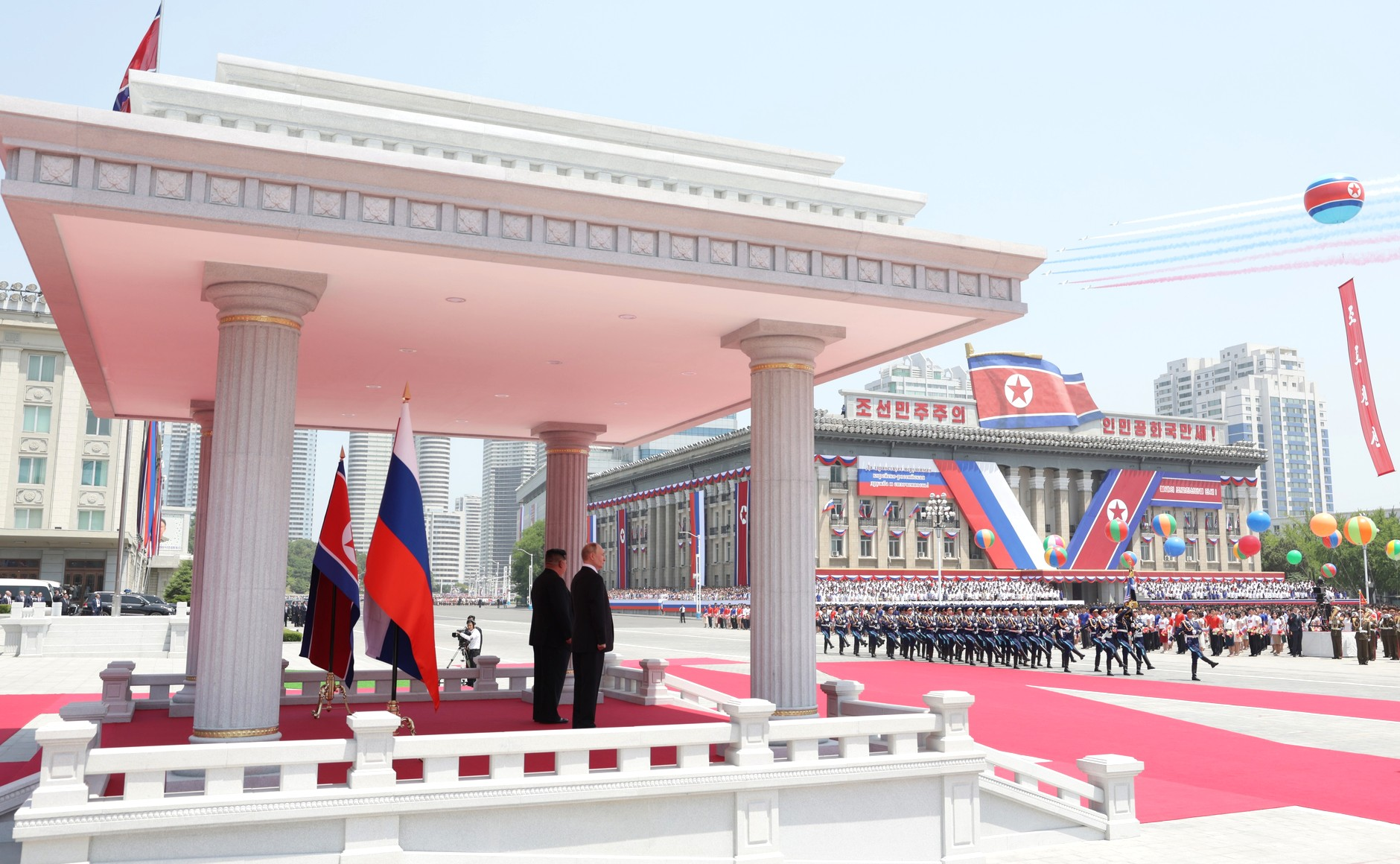
North Korean leader Kim Jong Un and Russian President Vladimir Putin watching a military parade at the Kim Il Sung Square during the June 2024 summit.
