= Juche Tower =

Architectural structure in Pyongyang, North Korea

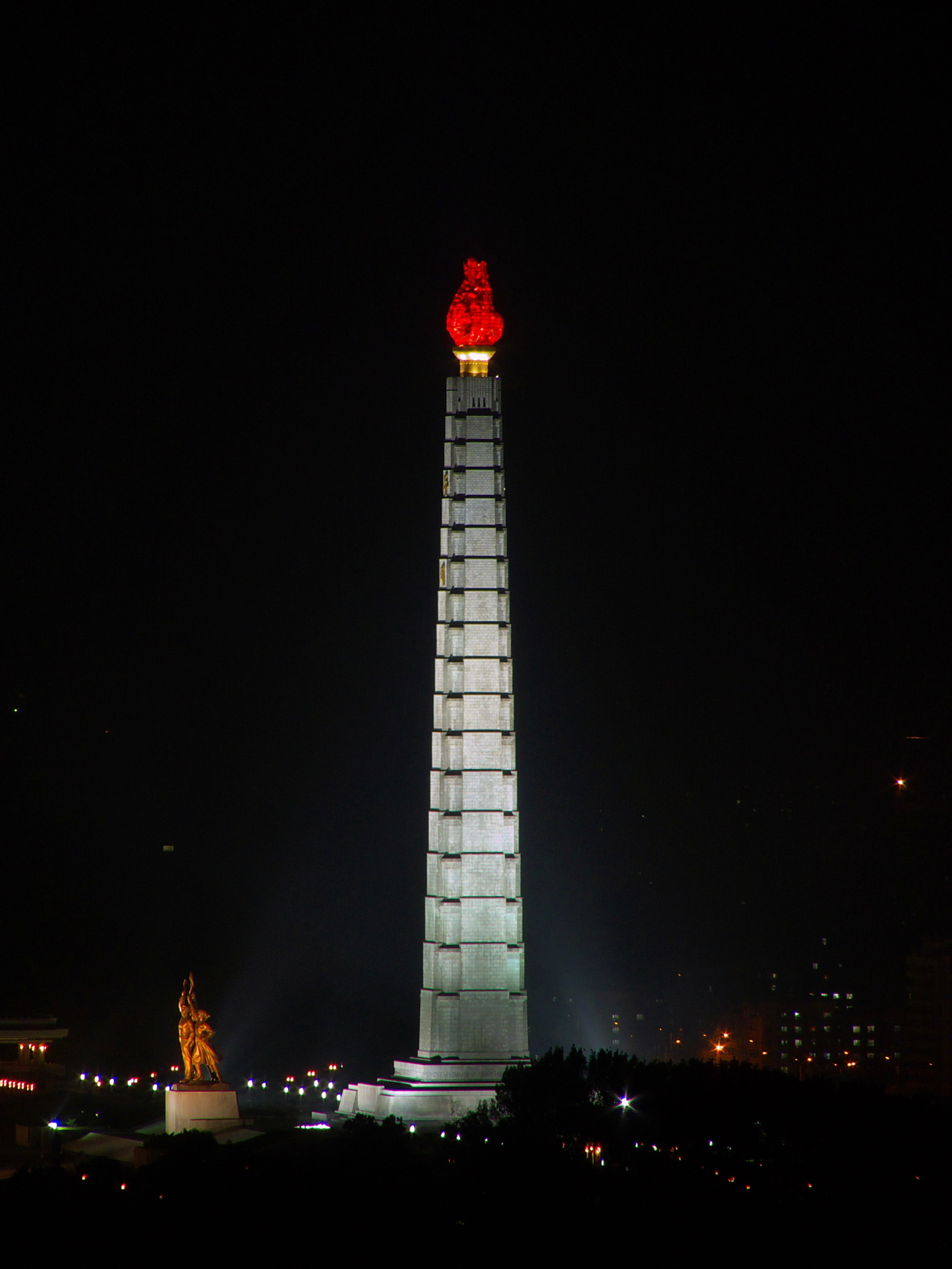
- The Juche Tower at night
- Interactive map of Juche Tower
- Location: Pyongyang, North Korea
- Coordinates: 39°01′03″N 125°45′49″E
- Designer: Kim Jong Il
- Material: Granite and white stone
- Height: 170 metres (560 ft)
- Completion date: April 15, 1982
- Dedicated to: Juche

Korean name
- Hangul: 주체사상탑
- Hanja: 主體思想塔
- RR: Juche sasangtap
- MR: Chuch'e sasangt'ap

The Juche Tower (more formally, the Tower of the Juche Idea; Korean: 주체사상탑), completed in 1982, is a 170-metre (560 ft) monument in Pyongyang, the capital of North Korea. The monument is named after the ideology of Juche introduced by North Korea's first leader, Kim Il Sung.

The Juche Tower is situated on the east bank of the River Taedong, directly opposite Kim Il Sung Square on the west bank. It was built to commemorate Kim Il Sung's 70th birthday and was unveiled at the birthday celebration on April 15, 1982.

The 170-metre (560 ft) structure is composed of a four-sided tapering 150-metre (490 ft) spire – the tallest granite structure in the world – containing 25,550 blocks (one for each day of the first 70 years of Kim Il Sung's life), dressed in white stone with seventy dividers and capped with a 20-metre (66 ft)-high 45-ton permanently illuminated metal torch.

== Background ==
The Juche Tower is situated on the east bank of the River Taedong, directly opposite Kim Il Sung Square on the west bank. It was built to commemorate Kim Il Sung's 70th birthday. Although his son and successor Kim Jong Il is officially credited as its designer, interviews with North Korean former officials contradict this assertion.

The architectural style of the Tower is inspired by stone pagodas of premodern Korea. The 170-metre (560 ft) structure is a four-sided tapering 150-metre (490 ft) spire – the tallest in granite – containing 25,550 blocks (365 × 70: one for each day of Kim Il Sung's life, excluding supplementary days for leap years), dressed in white stone with seventy dividers and capped with a 20-metre (66 ft)-high 45-ton illuminated metal torch.

The torch on top of the tower is always lit. It is possible to ascend the tower by elevator and there are wide views over Pyongyang from the viewing platform just below the torch.

At its base, there are reception rooms where videos explaining the tower's ideological importance are sometimes shown. The Juche Tower is the second-tallest monumental column in the world after the San Jacinto Monument in Texas, United States, which is 2.9 metres (9.5 ft) taller.

Associated with the tower is a 30-metre-high (98 ft) statue consisting of three idealised figures each holding a tool – a hammer (the worker); a sickle (the peasant); and a writing brush (the "working intellectual") – in a classic Stalinist-style reminiscent of the Soviet statue Worker and Kolkhoz Woman. The three tools form the emblem of the ruling Workers' Party of Korea. There are also six smaller groups of figures, each 10 metres (33 ft) high, that symbolize other aspects of Juche ideology.

A wall carrying 82 friendship plaques from foreign supporters and Juche study groups forms part of the Tower.

== Gallery ==
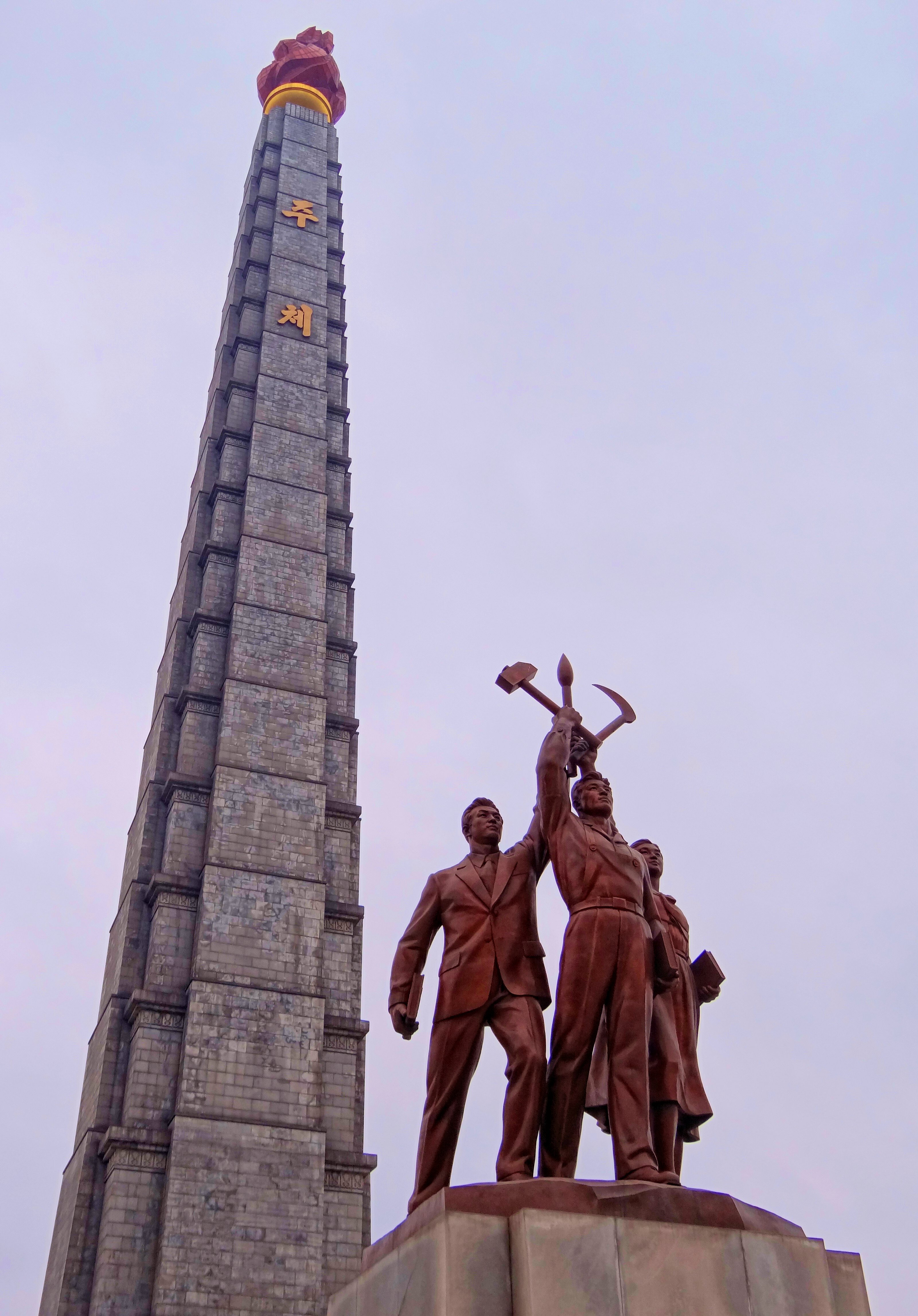
Up-close view of the Juche Tower and the accompanying monument to the Workers' Party of Korea

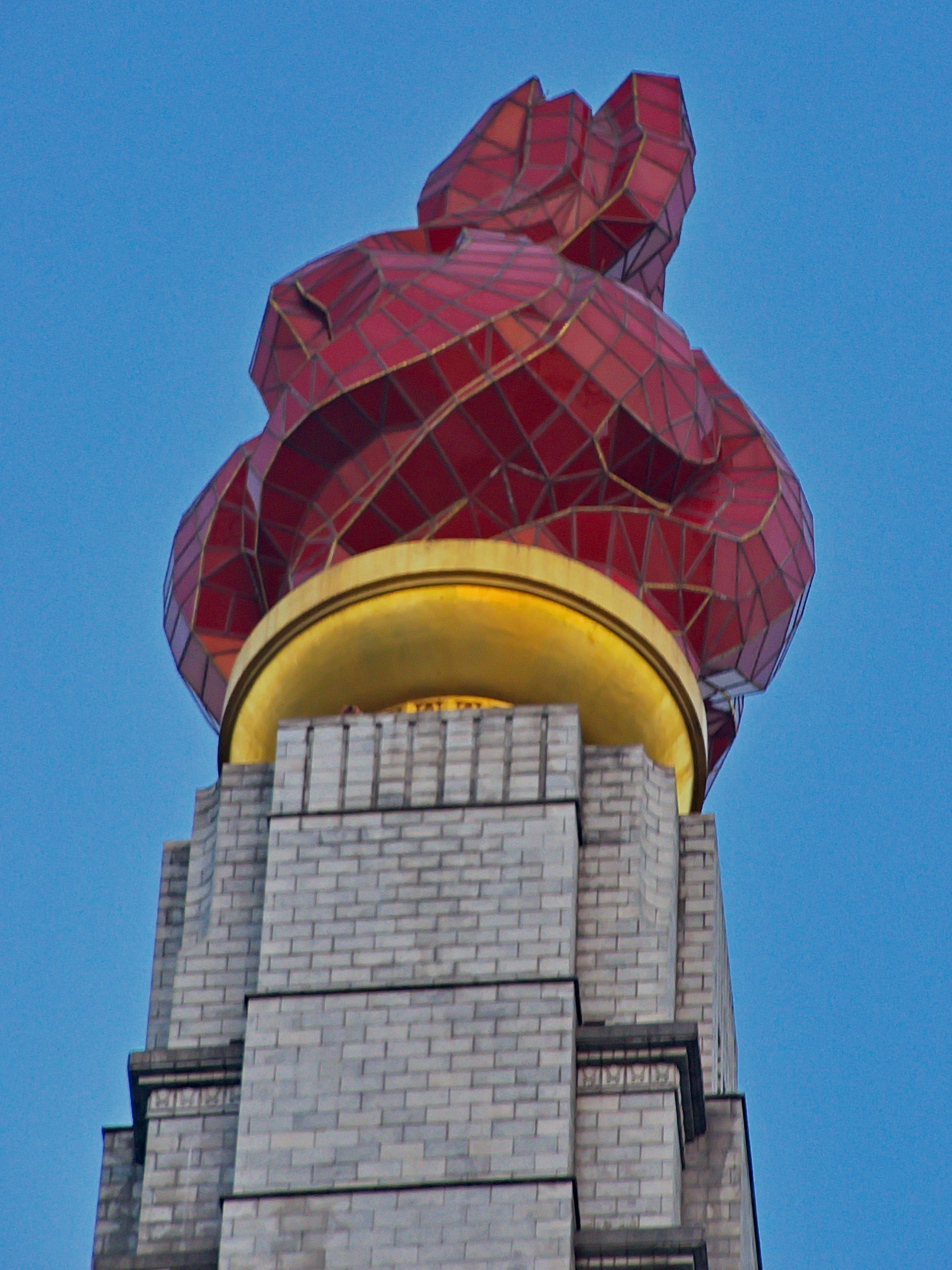
Torch symbolizing Juche at the top of the Juche Tower

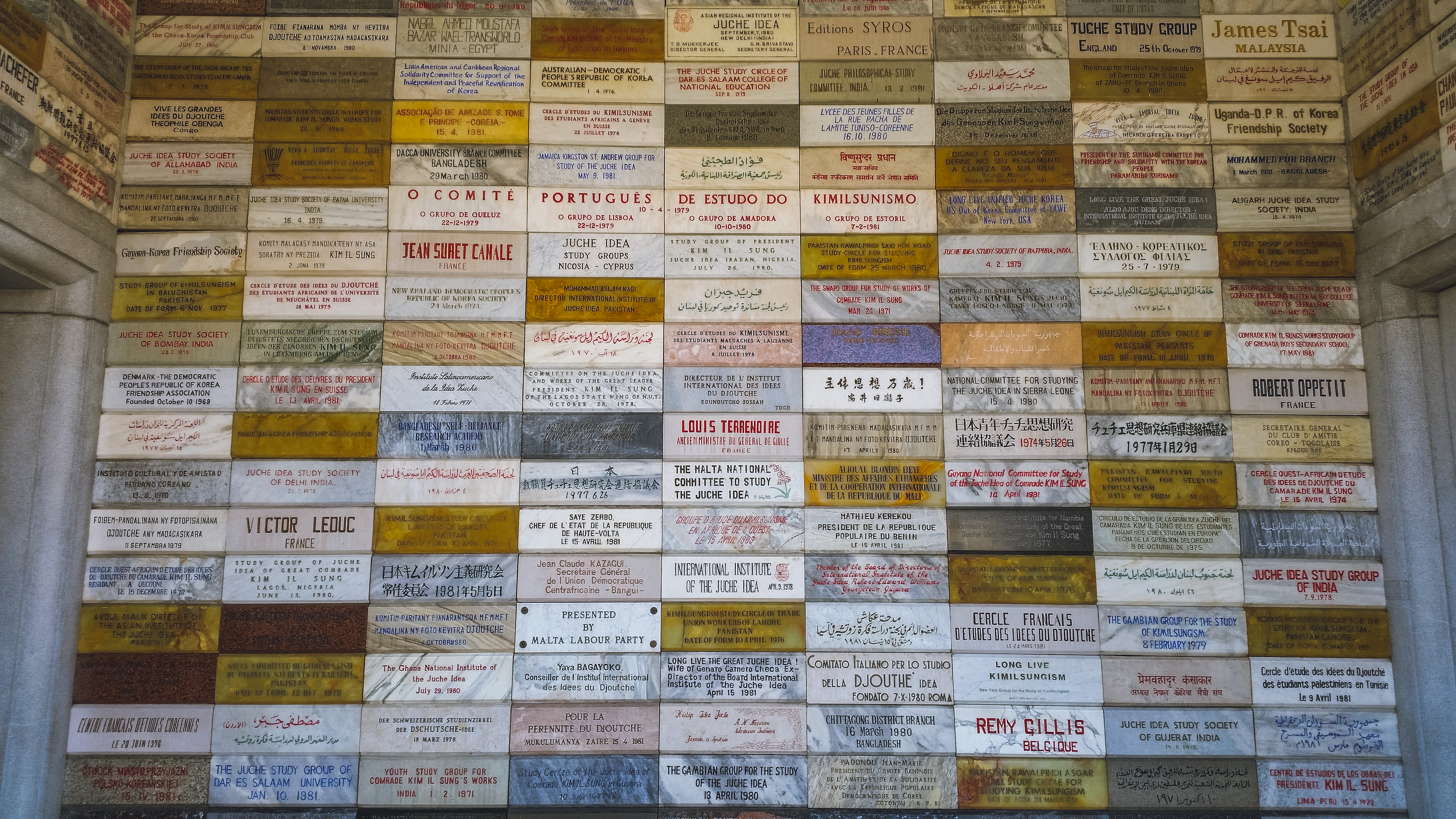
Tribute plaques to Juche from foreign delegates, contained in the interior entrance of the tower

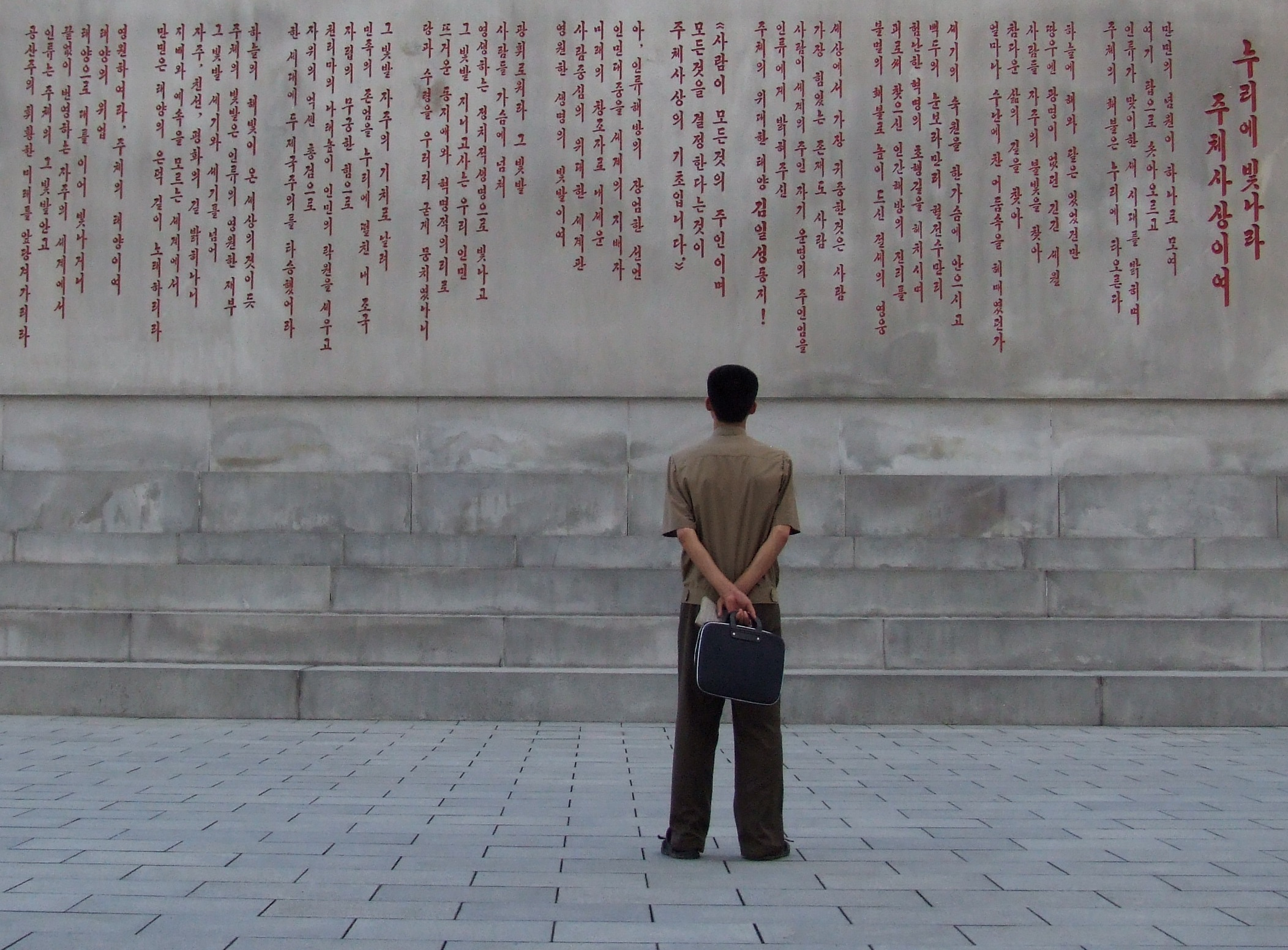
A man reading the text at the base of the Juche Tower

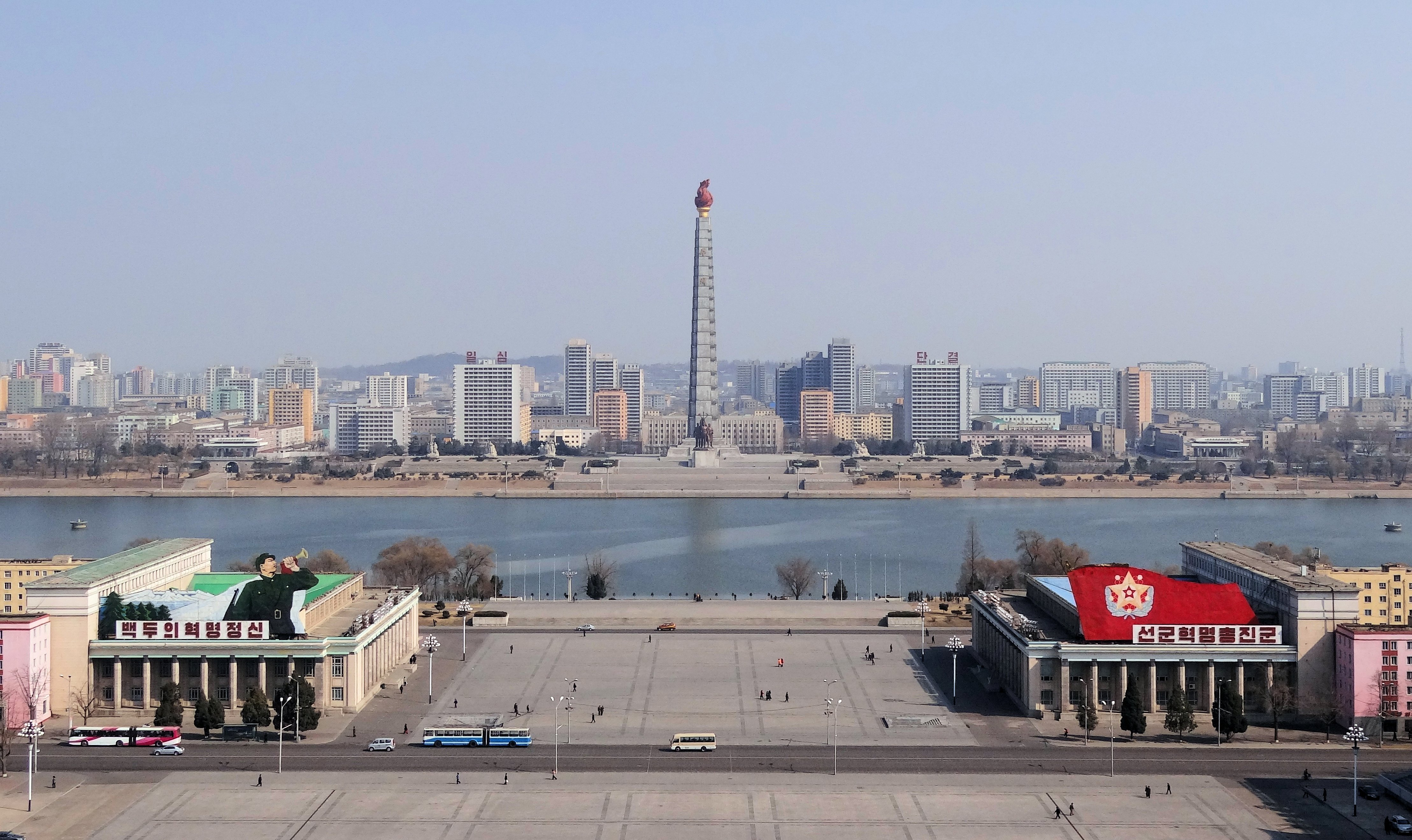
View of the Juche Tower from the roof of the Grand People's Study House

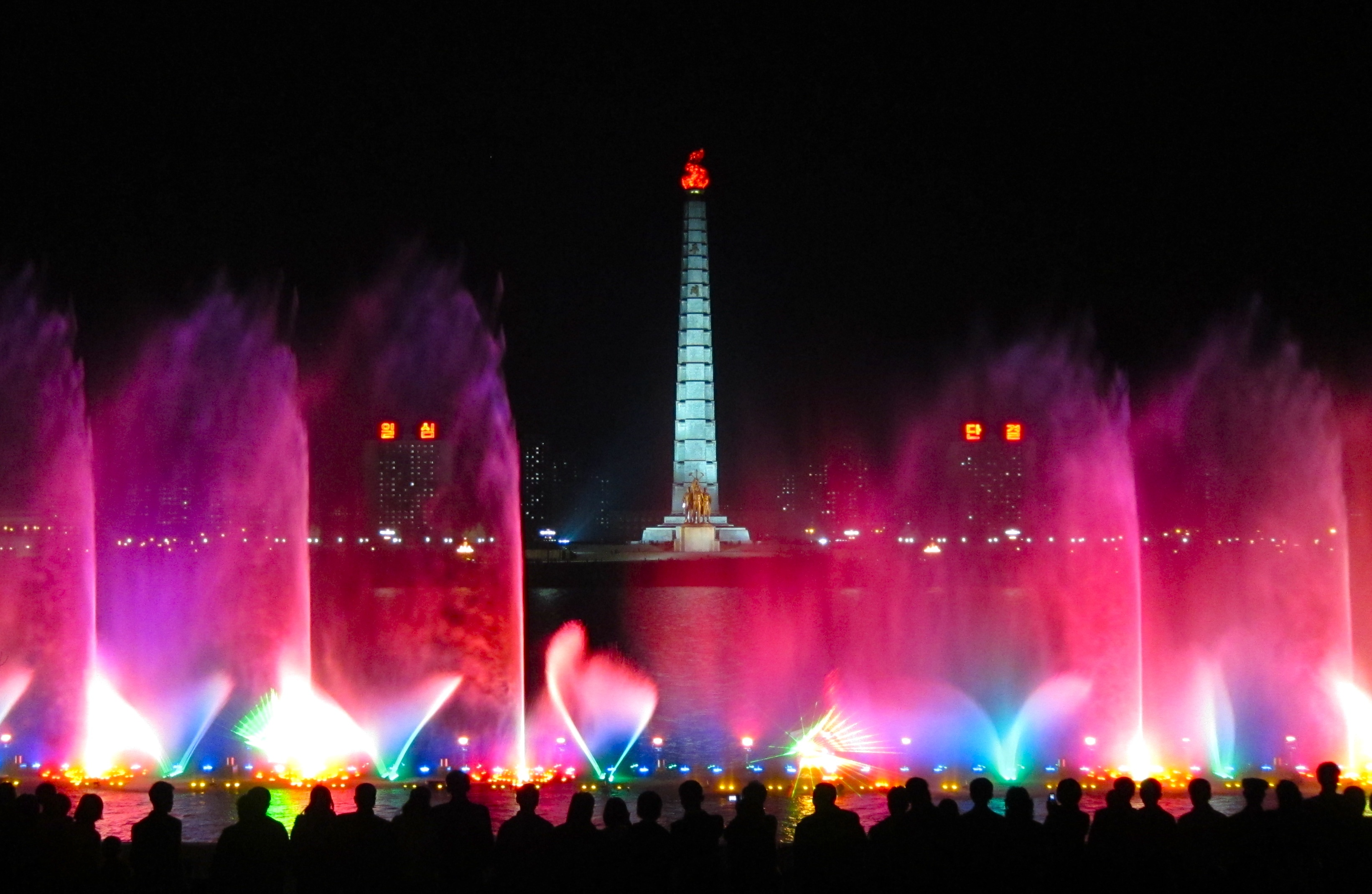
The Juche Tower during evening celebrations of International Workers' Day (May Day) in 2010

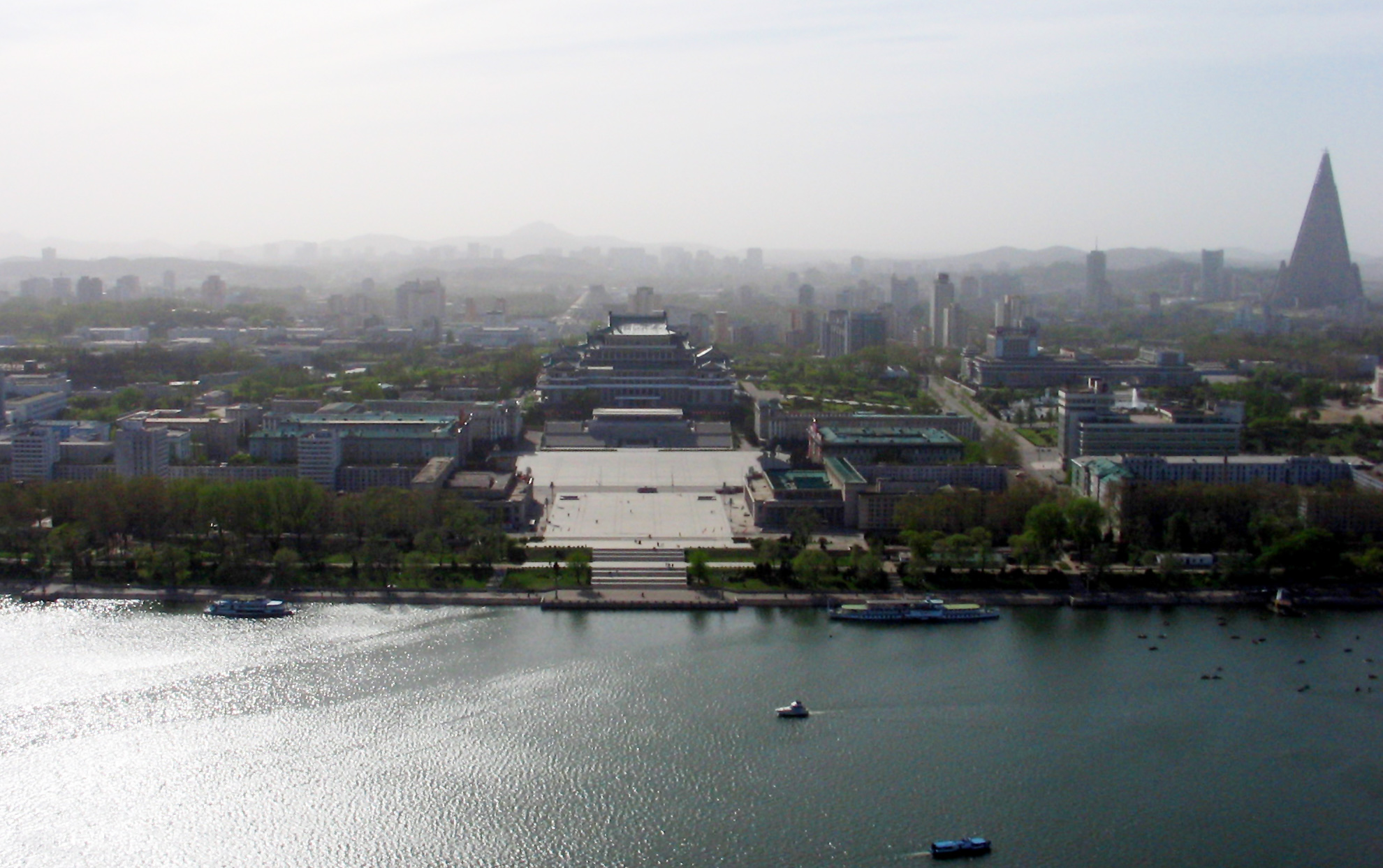
View of Kim Il-sung Square from the top of the Juche Tower

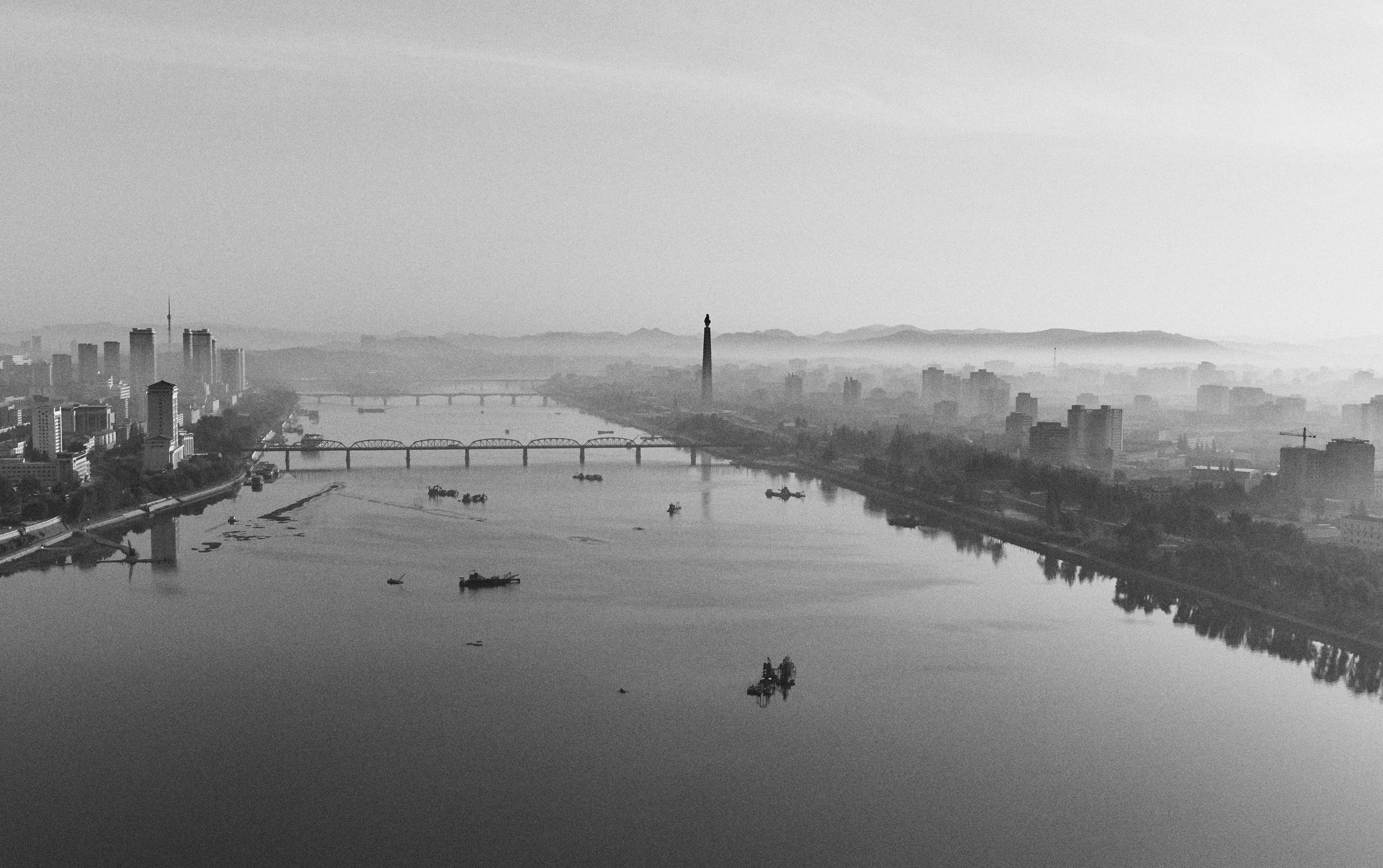
View of Pyongyang with the Juche Tower in the background

== See also ==
- Monas, a similarly designed monument-tower in Jakarta, Indonesia, topped with flame statue and elevator ride to the top observation deck
- Washington Monument in Washington, D.C., United States, an obelisk erected to commemorate George Washington
- San Jacinto Monument near La Porte, Texas, United States, the world's tallest masonry column to commemorate the Battle of San Jacinto
- Monument to Party Founding
- Arch of Triumph (Pyongyang)
- Arch of Reunification
