= Chollima Statue =

Monument in Pyongyang, North Korea

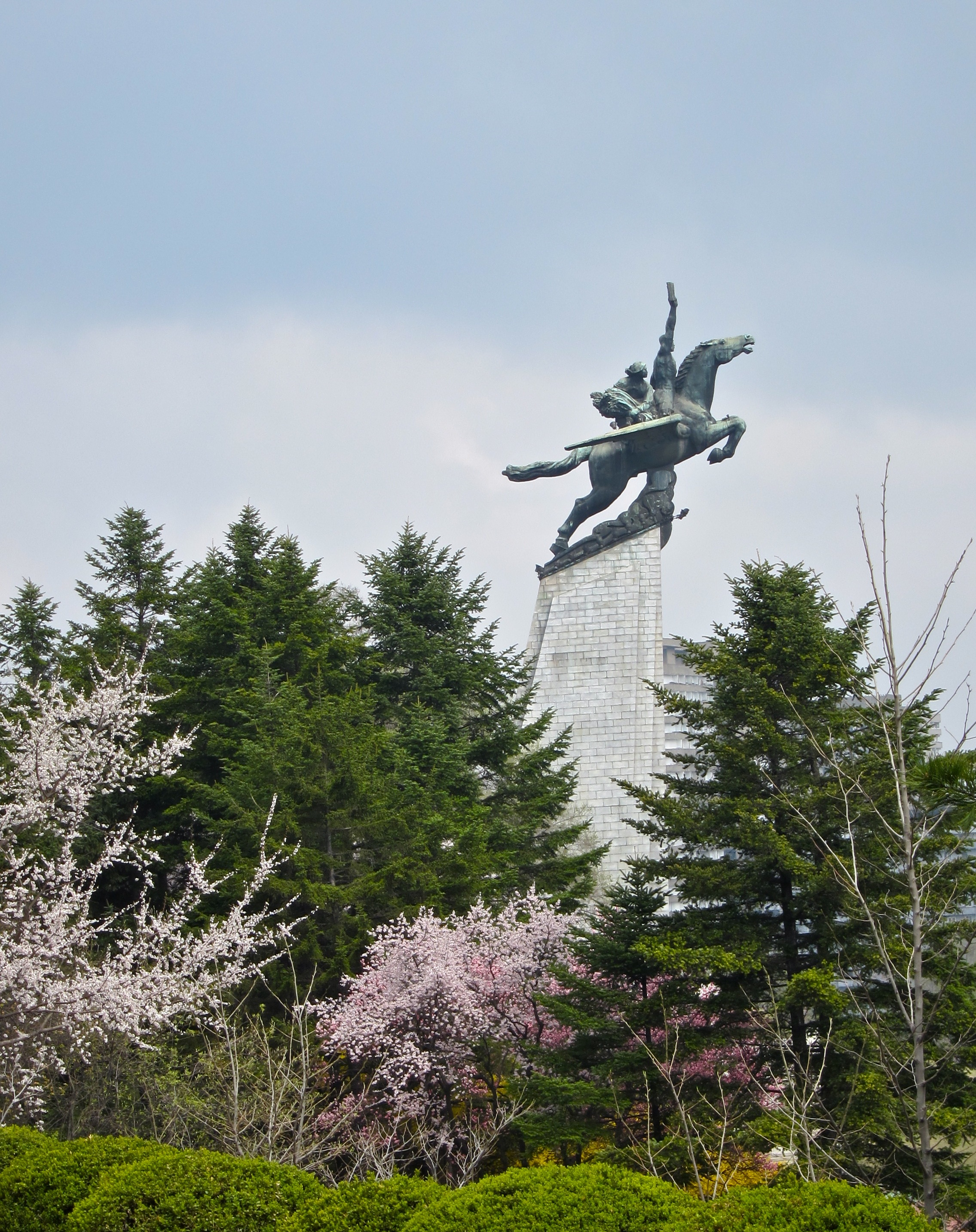
- The statue in 2010
- Interactive map of Chollima Statue
- Location: Pyongyang, North Korea
- Coordinates: 39°2′3.5″N 125°45′10.5″E
- Material: Granite and bronze
- Height: 46 m (151 ft)
- Opening date: 15 April 1961
- Dedicated to: Chollima Movement

Korean name
- Hangul: 천리마동상
- Hanja: 千里馬銅像
- RR: Cheollima dongsang
- MR: Ch'ŏllima tongsang

The Chollima Statue (Korean: 천리마동상) is a monument on Mansu Hill in Pyongyang, North Korea. The monument symbolizes the "Chollima speed" of the Chollima Movement. The legendary winged horse Chollima depicted by the monument is said to travel 1,000 ri (400 km) a day.

== History ==
The monument was constructed as a gift to Kim Il Sung. It was built by the Merited Sculpture Production Company of the Mansudae Art Studio. The statue was unveiled on 15 April 1961, the 49th birthday of Kim Il Sung. The impetus to build the monument was Kim Il Sung's speech "Let Us Further Develop Popular Art" given to rural amateur artist groups on 7 March 1961. The statue was based upon the idea of the Chollima Movement in order to encourage North Korean economic growth in the 1950s, following the ceasefire in the Korean War. The Chollima Statue was awarded the People's Prize.

The statue has since become a popular tourist attraction within North Korea. Throughout the 1970s to the 1990s, the Chollima Statue regularly appeared on various issuances of North Korean postage stamps.

== Features ==
The monument is 46 meters tall in total. The sculpture stands 14 meters high and is 16 meters long. The two figures riding the Chollima, a male worker and a female farmer, are 7 meters and 6.5 meters tall, respectively. The worker raises the "Red Letter" of the Central Committee of the Workers' Party of Korea, and the peasant holds a sheaf of rice. The figures are made of bronze, while the base is granite.

== See also ==
- Socialist realism
- Culture of North Korea
- Korean architecture
