= Portraits of Kim Il Sung and Kim Jong Il =

Depictions of North Korean rulers

Visual depictions of Kim Il Sung have been commonplace in North Korea since the 1940s following the example of Joseph Stalin in the Soviet Union and Mao Zedong in China, though to an extent that supersedes both. The display of Kim Il Sung portraits was made mandatory at homes in the 1970s. In the past, they were mandatory in certain public places as well, such as factories, schools, airports, railway stations, and rail and subway carriages. At present, they no longer appear in means of transport, not even in some new buildings. Portraits of Kim Jong Il have been hung next to Kim Il Sung since the late 1970s. A portrait of Kim Jong Un was displayed for the first time in public in 2018.

Rules regarding the placement and maintenance of the portraits are complex and change frequently. At homes, they should be placed on the most prominent wall in the living room with nothing else on it, high and looking downwards. Of importance, and subject to random checks, is that they are kept clean.

== History ==
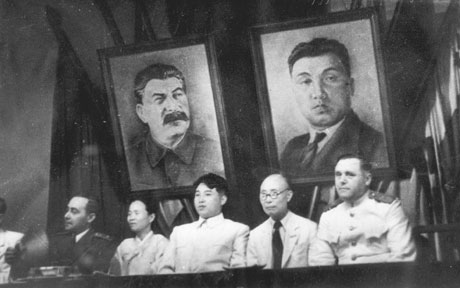
Portrait of Kim Il Sung next to Stalin during the 1st Congress of the Workers' Party of North Korea in 1946

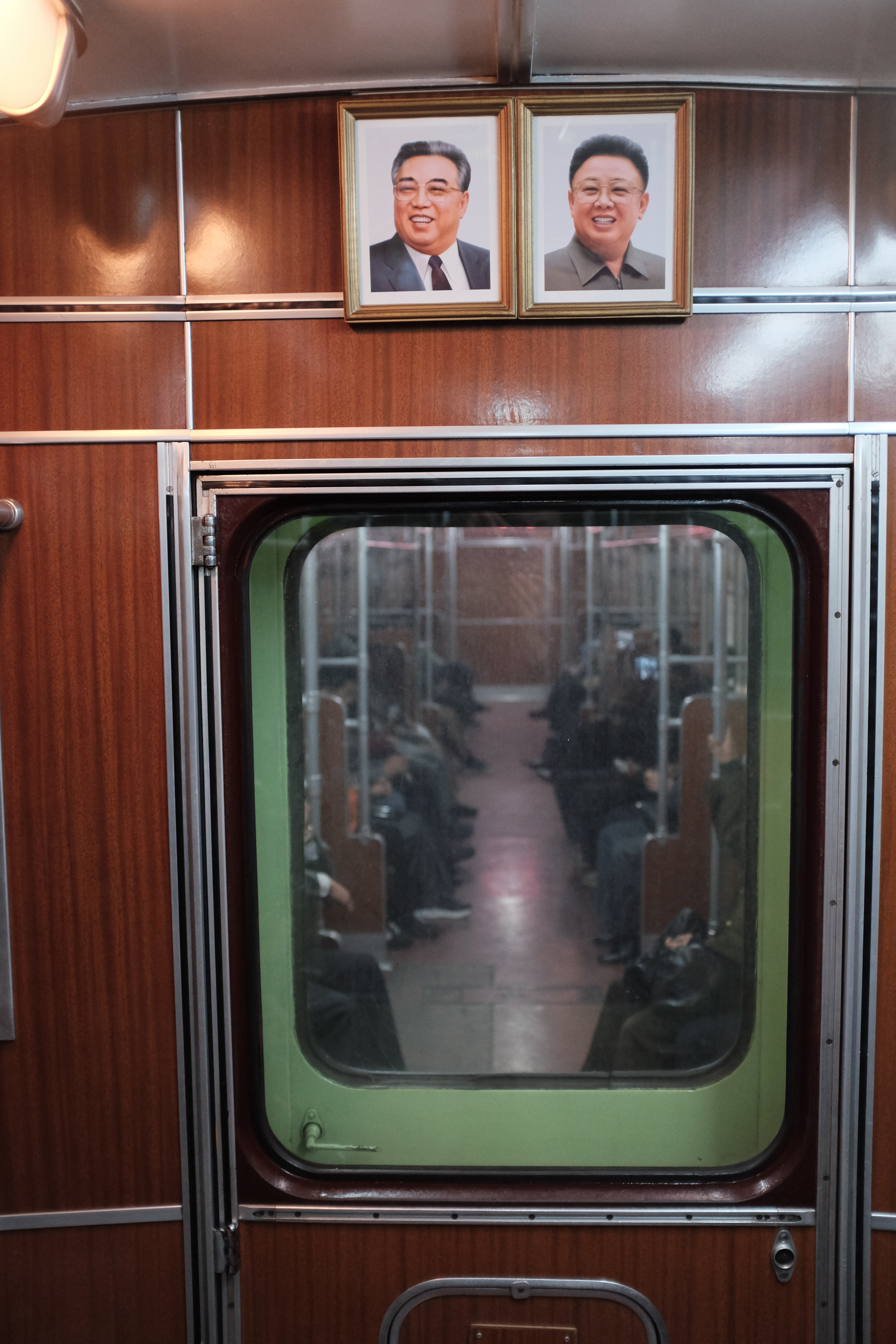
Portraits on the Pyongyang Metro

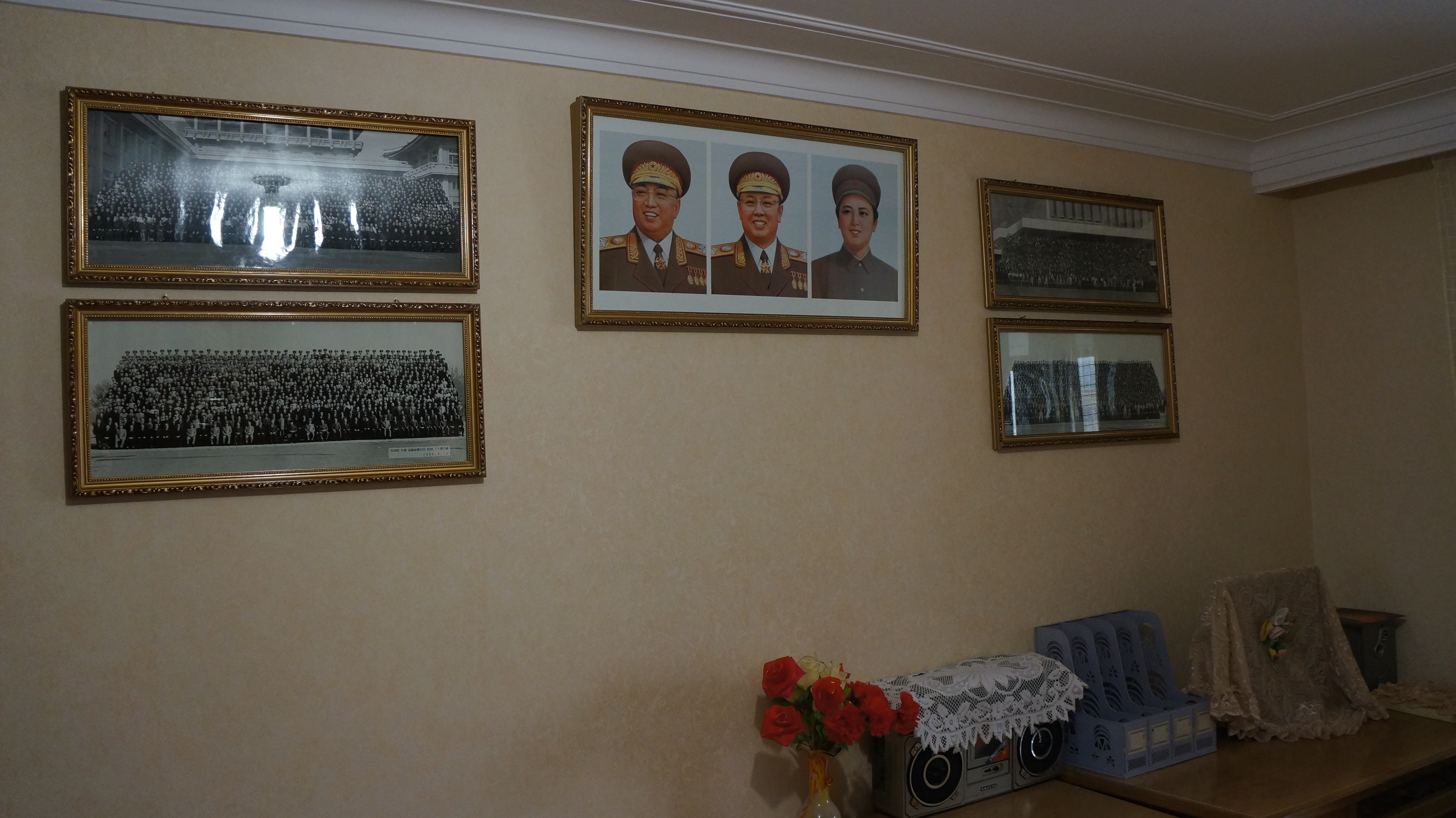
Portraits of Kim Il Sung, Kim Jong Il, and Kim Jong Suk in a private home

Since the 1940s, visual depictions of Kim Il Sung have been commonplace in North Korea. The practice was adopted from Stalin portraits in the Soviet Union and portraits of Mao Zedong in China. Displaying a portrait of Kim Il Sung in every house became mandatory in the 1970s. The state distributed such portraits and instructed people to display them in their living rooms. By Kim Il Sung's 60th birthday in 1972, North Korea had more leader portraits than the Soviet Union or China ever did. In 1972, the compulsory display of the portraits was extended to all factories, airports, and railway stations.

At the end of the decade, North Koreans were told to hang portraits of Kim Jong Il next to their portraits of Kim Il Sung. The regulation was put in place relatively late into Kim Jong Il's cult of personality. The reason was that he had little, and by 1980 virtually no competition as the heir apparent. The order to do so became unofficial so that North Korean propaganda could claim that there was a spontaneous movement that supported Kim Jong Il. By around 1980, every office and home had the two portraits on display. In the 1980s, the rules on portraits were extended yet again to cover rail and subway carriages. Buses and trams were excluded for unknown reasons. Since the early 1990s, Kim Jong Il portraits have been the same size as those depicting Kim Il Sung, and their display has been standardized so that they are always displayed side by side. In the 1990s, a third kind of portrait was added that depicts Kim Jong Il and Kim Il Sung engaged in discussion about state management. High-ranking officials were given yet another portrait, that of Kim Il Sung's first wife and mother of Kim Jong Il, Kim Jong Suk. Offices, however, do not display this picture. In recent years, the portraits' societal importance has waned.

The image of Kim Il Sung underwent changes as he aged and according to political currents: early portraits from the 1960s have him in a Mao suit, while those from the 1980s depict him in a Western suit. Years after his death, he began to appear in the military uniform of Taewonsu (generalissimo). Images of Kim Jong Il, too, went from Mao suit to the Taewonsu uniform.

Under Kim Jong Un, the appearances of the portraits have become increasingly standardized. The current versions of the portraits consists of Kim Il Sung in a western-style suit and Kim Jong Il wearing his trademark grey jumpsuit.

A portrait of Kim Jong Un was displayed for the first time in public in November 2018 during a visit of Cuban president Miguel Díaz-Canel to Pyongyang. In May 2024, at the opening of a training school for cadets of the Workers' Party of Korea (WPK), another large portrait of Kim Jong Un was displayed at the building front. New portraits were also displayed along with his predecessors at another block and the classrooms.

Andrei Lankov, an expert on North Korea, notes that the set of rules regarding the portraits changes frequently, making it "remarkable for its constant fluidity".

== Display ==
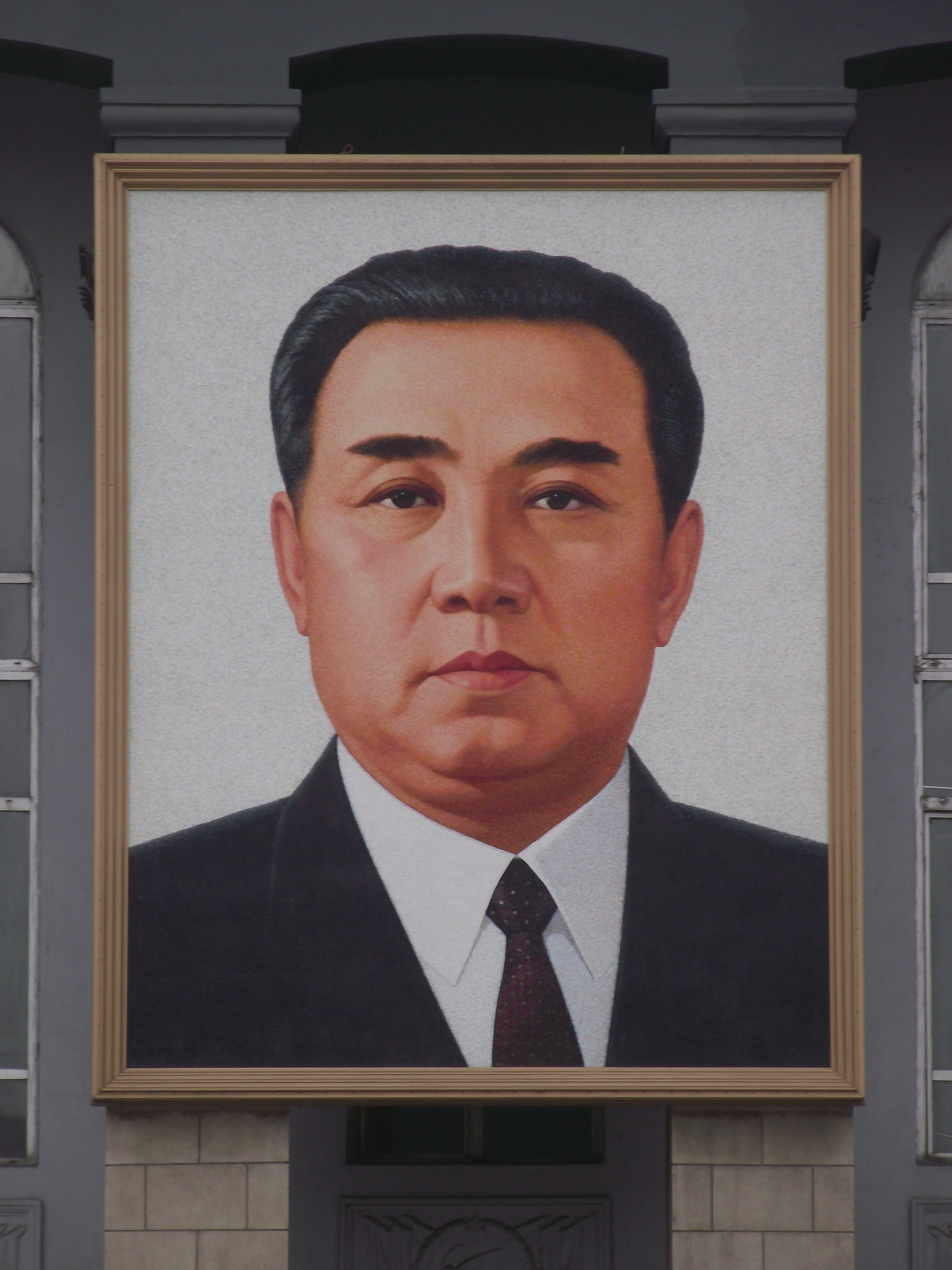
The official portrait of Kim Il Sung as seen on Kim Il Sung Square main ministerial building

Today, the portraits are found everywhere in North Korea. Rules regarding the display and maintenance of the portraits are complex. The portraits should be hung on the most prominent wall of the apartment with nothing else on it, preferably in the living room. They must be kept clean and may not be hung off-center. Any disrespect to the images of the leaders is criminal. This includes not only portraits hung on walls but also e.g. images in newspapers. Any damage or destruction to the portraits leads to an investigation and, if the suspect is found guilty, punishment. A penalty of one day of hard labor at a construction site is reported for failure to properly hang the portraits. The portraits are to be protected even in the case of an emergency. Still, neglecting care for the portraits is considered a rather minor offense, and as such, it is a typical confession that people make during mutual criticism sessions. Random checks for the portraits are carried out, monthly at least during Kim Il Sung's reign, but the inminban (neighborhood watch) sometimes tips people off of inspections.

When a North Korean changes apartment, he or she must start by hanging the portraits first. The portraits are usually hung on a wall with nothing else, placed high, and looking downwards. Some families bow to the portraits every morning and in the evening, saying greetings, even though bowing to them is not mandatory even in public places. When a North Korean family mourns a dead member, ceremonial greetings and offerings are made to the deceased, but only after the two portraits have been given the same treatment. The portraits are usually kept clean by adults in the house, typically the mother of the family. They wipe the glass every morning. Sometimes the portraits have a box under them that houses a white cloth used for dusting them that one is not allowed to use for any other purpose.

In addition to homes, offices, factories, shops, hospitals, classrooms and libraries sport the portraits, as do decks of ships and fronts of trains. In public buildings they are placed above the main entrances. All portraits are made by the Mansudae Art Studio. They are glazed and framed with timber.

== Safekeeping ==
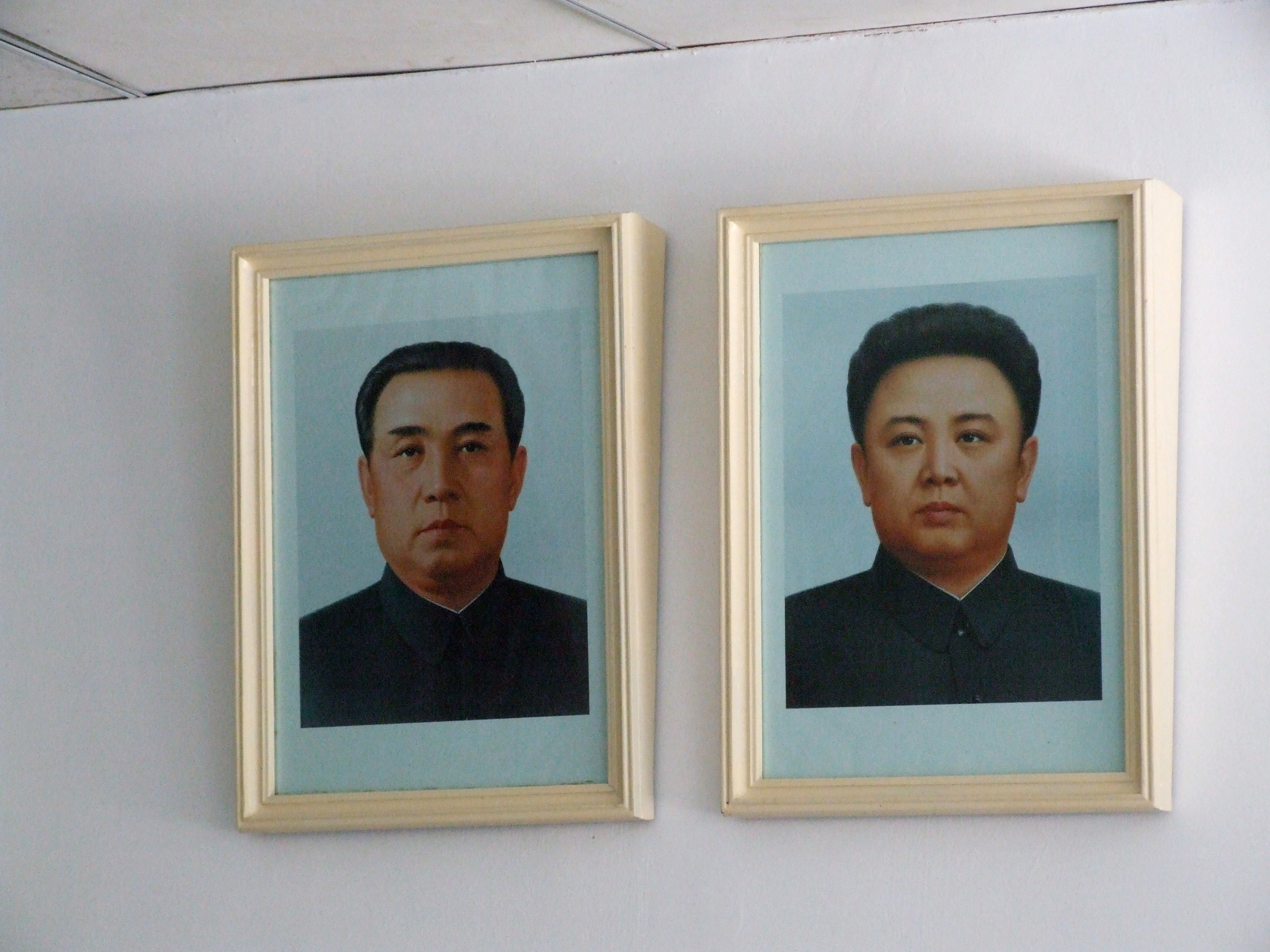
The official portraits of Kim Il Sung and Kim Jong Il as used in the 1970s and 1980s

Stories about North Koreans saving leader portraits from certain destruction have been sported in North Korean media for decades, and they have also been disseminated by the inminban. For instance, in 2007 it was reported that a factory worker rescued his leader portraits and his five-year-old daughter from a flooded house. When he was overpowered by the water, he let go of his daughter but managed to hold onto the portraits. Such a feat can raise the societal status of a person considerably by improving their songbun (ascribed social rank in North Korea). Saving portraits is based on an arbitrary interpretation of the Ten Principles for the Establishment of a Monolithic Ideological System.

== Special portraits ==
In addition to the standardized portraits, there have been special cases. One of these is a gift from Ba'athist Syria, a portrait of Kim Il Sung that is entirely made up of Arabic calligraphy of his work The Non-Aligned Movement is a Mighty Anti-Imperialist Revolutionary Force of Our Times, housed at the International Friendship Exhibition. The largest Kim Il Sung portrait, at least in Pyongyang, was 15 by 11 metres and was hung at the Pyongyang Department Store No. 1 in the 1990s.

== See also ==
- Kim Il Sung and Kim Jong Il badges
- Culture of North Korea
- List of things named after Kim Il Sung
- North Korean cult of personality
- Guerrillero Heroico
- Portrait
- Mansu Hill Grand Monument
- Ge Xiaoguang
