= Voluntary People's Druzhina =

Voluntary Soviet Union public order detachments

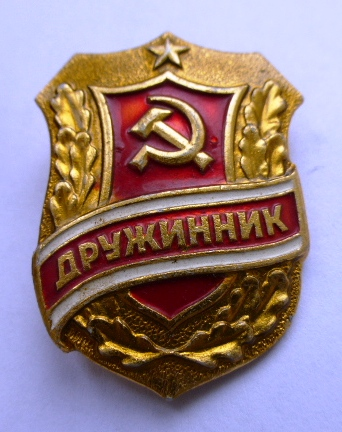
- Soviet druzhinnik's badge
- Abbreviation: VPD (ДНД)
- Formation: founded 1955; dissolution 1991
- Type: Voluntary security public order
- Location(s): Soviet Union Russia
- Official language: Russian
- Affiliations: Communist Party of the Soviet Union; Komsomol
- Remarks: Color : Red

Voluntary People's Druzhina (Russian: Добровольная народная дружина, ДНД, Dobrovolnaya narodnaya druzhina, DND) variously translated as Voluntary People’s Guard, People’s Volunteer Squads, People's Volunteer Militia, etc. were voluntary detachments for maintaining public order in the Soviet Union similar to a neighborhood watch.

== History ==
People's Druzhinas in support of law enforcement were introduced in Russian Empire in 1913.

After the Russian Revolution of 1917 there were various forms of non-governmental workers and peasants' organizations, which were disbanded by the early 1930s. Instead the Voluntary Society for Support of Militsiya (ОСОДМИЛ) was created. In 1932 it was subordinated to militsiya and renamed to "Militsiya Support Brigades". (БРИГАДМИЛ).

== Soviet Union ==
The system of VPDs was introduced according to the joint resolution of the CPSU Central Committee and USSR Council of Ministers of March 2, 1959 On the Participation of the Workers in the Maintenance of Public Order, which formalized and widely propagated the 1958 Leningrad invention of the Voluntary People's Druzhina formally independent of militsiya. The druzhinas were not subordinated to militsiya and the management staff was established from various Soviet organizations: Soviets, trade unions, Komsomol, etc.

The patrolling druzhinas themselves were often accompanied by police officers (militsioners), for general guidance and official support. Although druzhinas were informal, they could perform citizen arrests of various petty offenders: drunkards, hooligans, etc. They were also used to support militsiya in performing non-dangerous arrests and other law enforcement duties.

The 1974 USSR Supreme Soviet Presidium Ukase "About the Main Duties and Rights of Voluntary People's Drushina in Guarding the Public Order" governed the druzhinas until the dissolution of the Soviet Union.

Druzhinas mostly operated in urban neighborhoods. Druzhinniks were distinguished by red armbands with the text "ДНД" (DND) or "дружинник" (druzhynnyk) on them.

== Russia ==
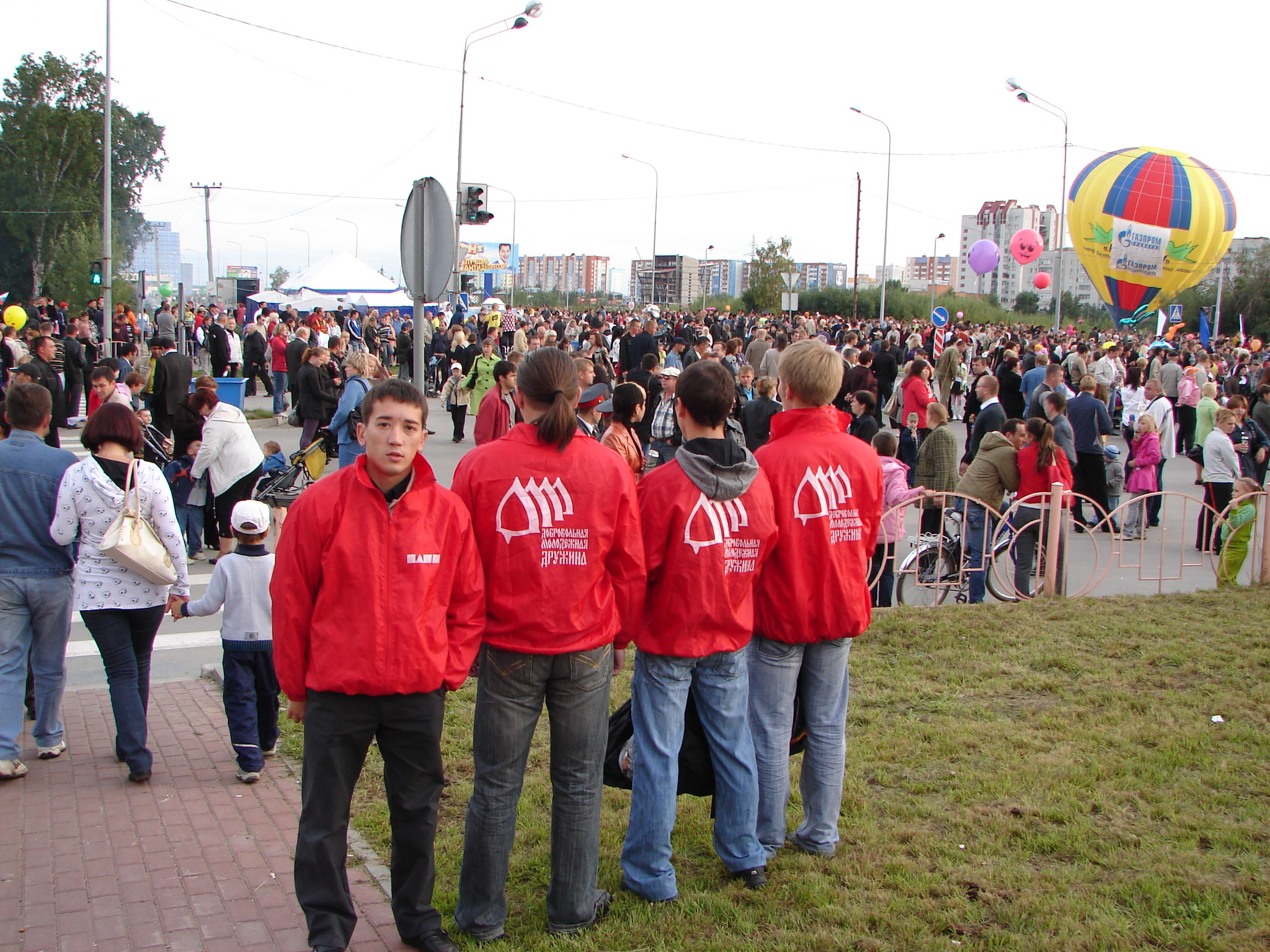
Voluntary youth Druzhina. Project of the youth movement of NASHI. (Russia, city Surgut) September 5, 2009

Attempts to reestablish public law enforcement organizations in Russia started as early as in 1992.

From 2008 to 2011 in Russia, on the initiative of the youth movement of NASHI, there were detachments called voluntary youth Druzhina (Russian: Добровольная Молодёжная Дружина, ДМД), but the project was shut down in July 2011.

As of the beginning of 2009, more than 34,000 public law enforcement formations were active in Russia, in which more than 363,000 people were members. At the same time, about 40,000 crimes were disclosed annually and over 400,000 administrative offenses were revealed.

The modern day Moscow City Police and Saint Petersburg City/Leningrad Oblast Police continue to maintain Druzhinnik forces of their own.

Beginning in April 2014 Druzhina forces were reorganised in every Russian region under the regional and city police forces.

== See also ==
- Neighborhood watch
- Civil Guard (Israel)
- Shomrim (neighborhood watch group)
- Hilfspolizei
- Inminban
- Committees for the Defense of the Revolution (Cuba)
- Committees for the Defense of the Revolution (Burkina Faso)
- Blockleiter (Nazi Germany)
- Unofficial collaborator (East Germany)
- Tonarigumi (WWII-era Japan)
- Work unit
