= Kim Il Sung and Kim Jong Il badges =

Lapel pins depicting North Korean leaders

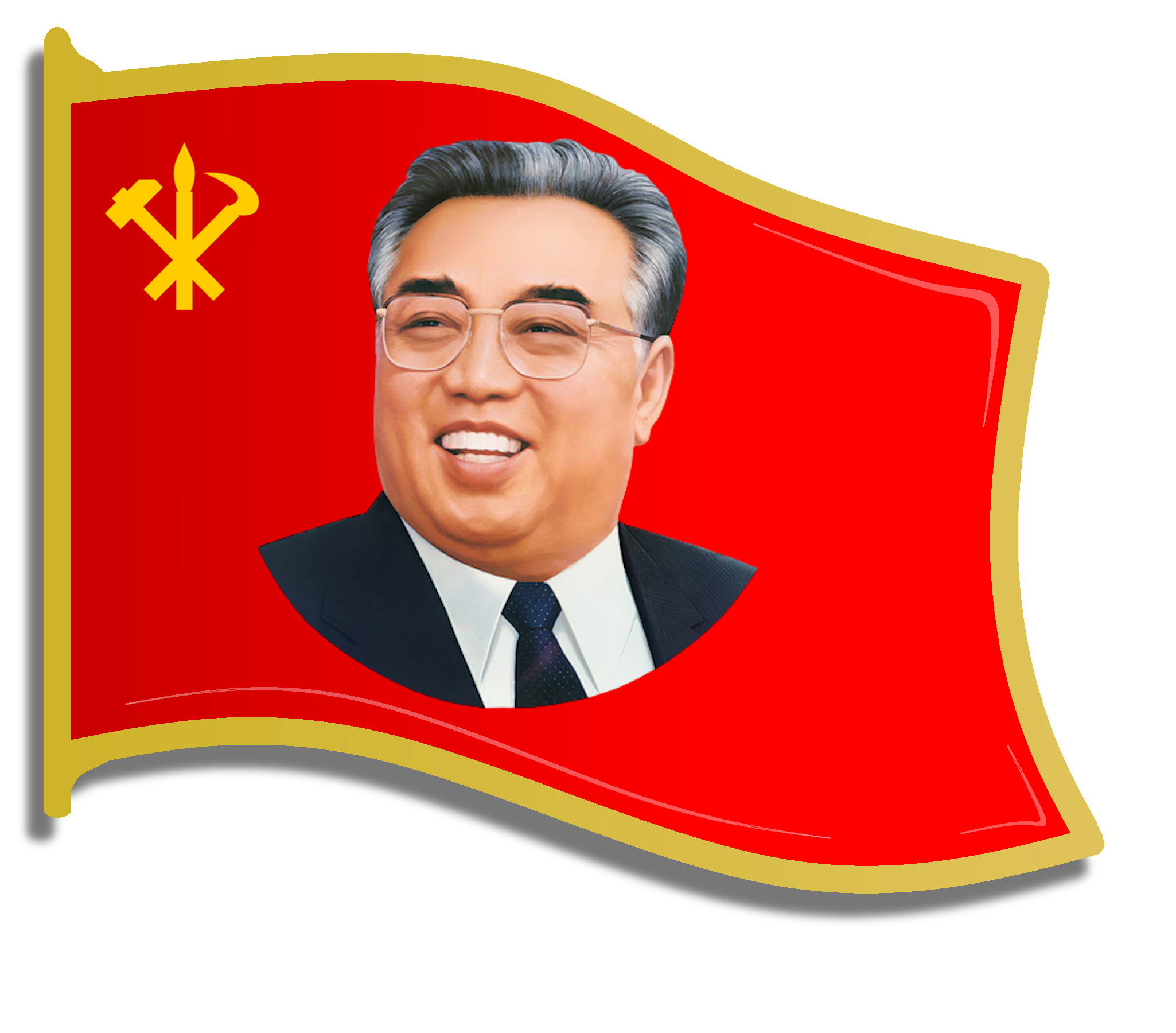
A Kim Il Sung badge

Kim Il Sung and Kim Jong Il badges are lapel pins with portraits depicting either one or both of the Eternal Leaders of North Korea, Kim Il Sung and Kim Jong Il. The badges have been common since the late 1960s, and are produced by the Mansudae Art Studio. There are more than 20 different designs, some of which are more common than others. Common examples include red flag-shaped pins depicting either Eternal President Kim Il Sung or Eternal General Secretary Kim Jong Il, smaller circular pins with the same portraits on white backgrounds (often with silver or gold edging), and larger flag-shaped pins depicting both leaders.

The badges were inspired by Chairman Mao badges worn by Chinese revolutionaries and citizens during the rule of Mao Zedong. Unlike their Chinese counterparts, which were never compulsory to wear, the North Korean badges have been an important part of North Korean attire for most of their history. As such, they are culturally more important than Mao badges ever were, and are a key part of North Korea's cult of personality. According to Jae-Cheon Lim, the badges are:

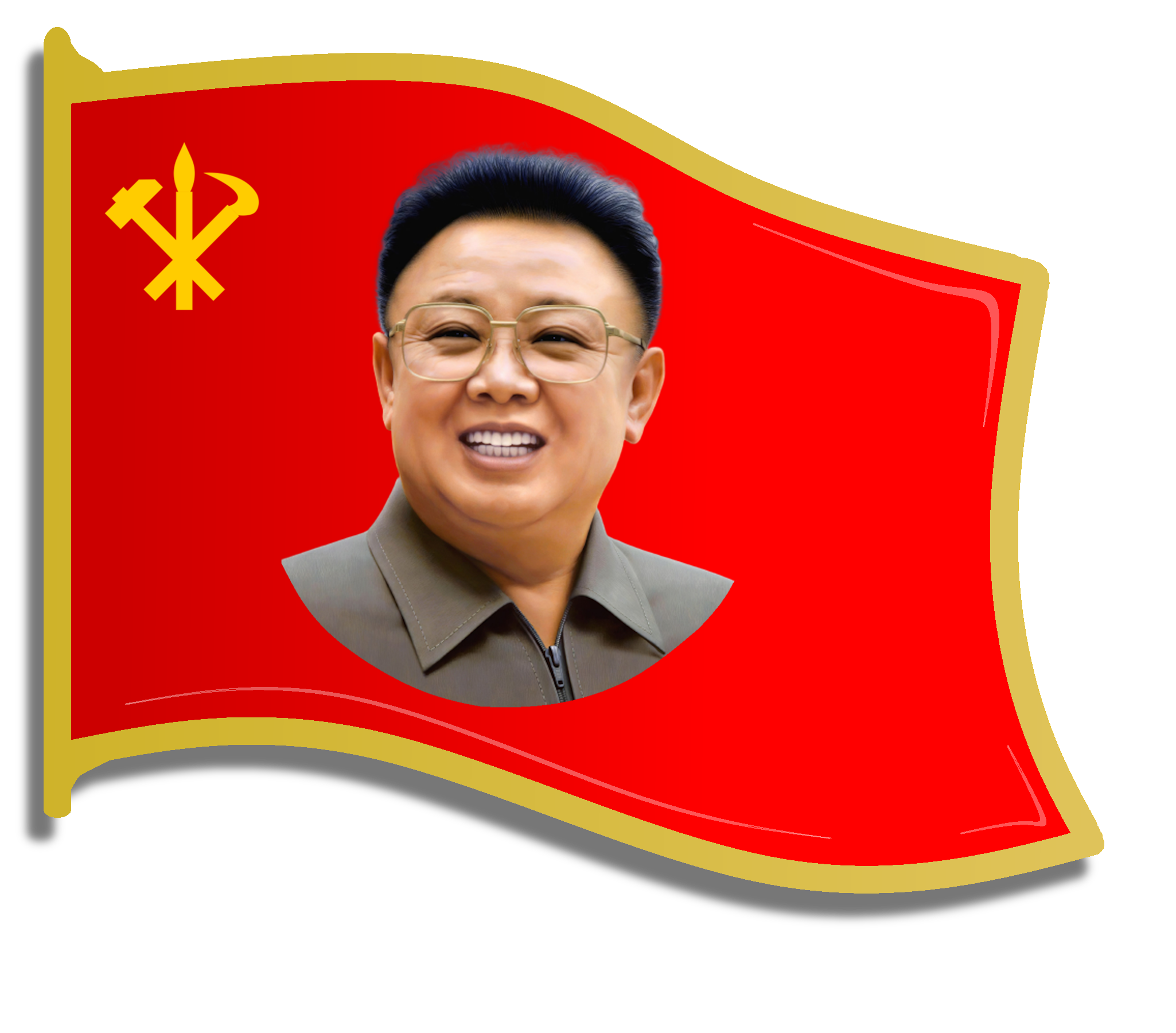
A Kim Jong Il badge

[a] formative symbol depicting the North Korean leaders. ... Wearing a leader badge is an identity symbol showing that North Koreans belong to their leader, thus distinguishing themselves from foreign citizens. Unlike other leader symbols, the badge is portable. ... Thus it is a symbol fulfilling the idea that the leaders are always with the people.

== History ==
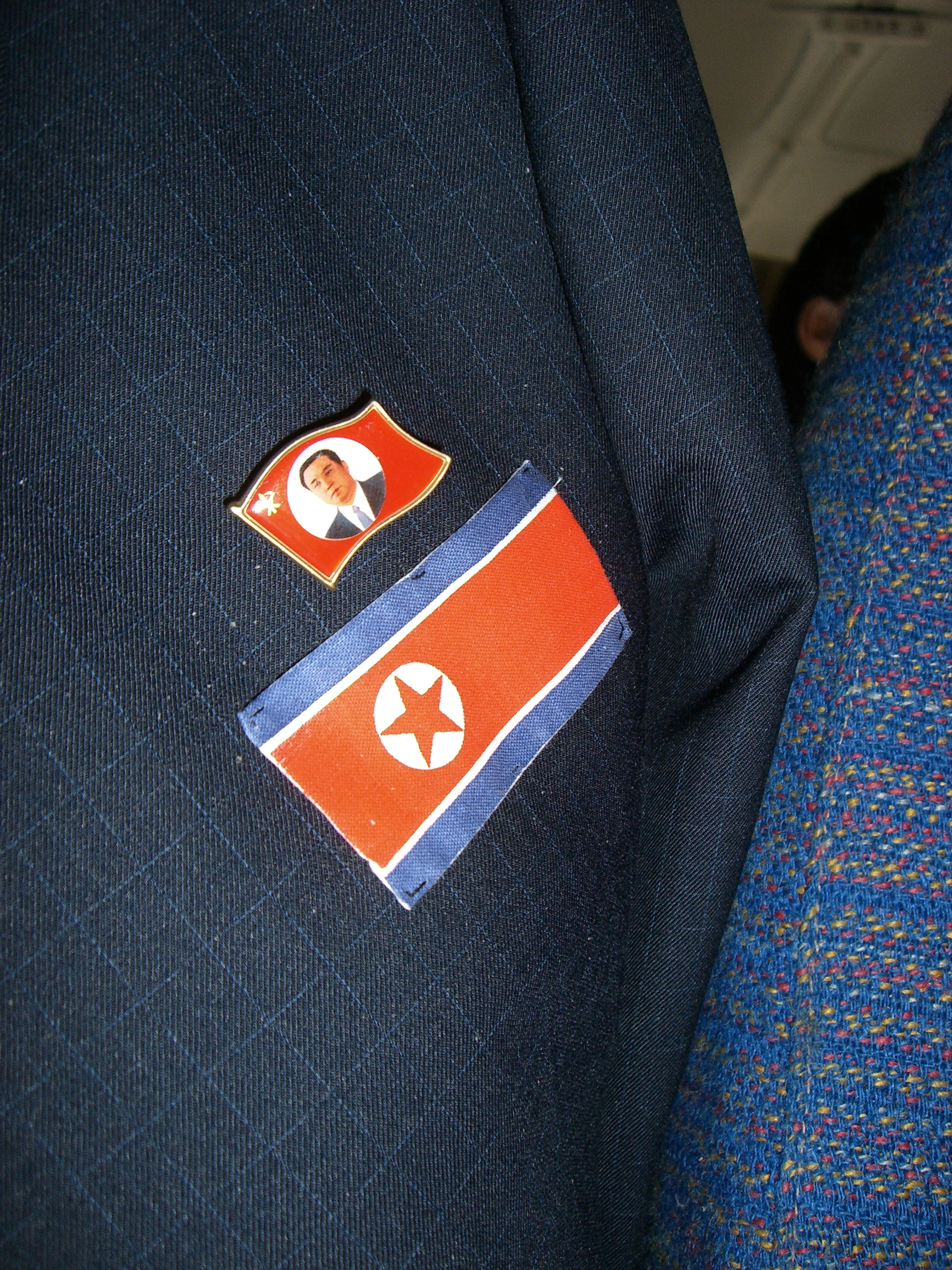
A Kim Il Sung badge and a North Korean flag emblem on a jacket

The inspiration for the badges were Chairman Mao badges worn by the Chinese during the Cultural Revolution, although North Korean propaganda attributes the idea to Kim Jong Il. It has been suggested by high-ranking defector Hwang Jang-yop that the Kapsan faction incident in 1967 triggered the systematic intensification of Kim Il Sung's cult of personality in general and the introduction of the badges in particular.

Badges bearing the portrait of Kim Il Sung first appeared in the late 1960s when the Mansudae Art Studio started making them for Workers' Party of Korea cadres, who started wearing them after the Kapsan faction incident. Mass-production followed in November 1970, after a decree by Kim Il Sung. The very first badges with portraits were produced by the party's Propaganda and Agitation Department. This batch of badges featured "a stern-looking portrait of Kim Il Sung with his mouth firmly closed". They were called "Party Badges" because only party officials would wear them, but ordinary North Koreans could also illegally buy them in hopes of a higher social status. These badges were made a mandatory part of the attire of every North Korean from Kim's 60th birthday on 15 April 1972 onward, when they came in three classes: for party members, one for adults, and one for students. Most would start wearing one from there on, and by 1980 virtually everyone wore the badges. The Kim Il Sung badge was redesigned after his death to feature a smiling portrait.

Badges bearing the portrait of Kim Jong Il appeared in 1982, and many started to wear one alongside their Kim Il Sung badges. The first badge containing both Kim Il Sung and Kim Jong Il appeared in the 1980s, but is different from the present double badge reserved for security services cadres. Kim Jong Il badges were discontinued in the 1990s following his alleged remark: "How can I be presented on the same level as our sole 'sun', Kim Il Sung?". In 1992, in time for Kim Jong Il's 50th birthday, a pin with his face only reappeared. It, too, was unpopular due to his known reluctance to be elevated to the level of his father. Kim Jong Il badges began to be worn more widely only around the year 2000, with a renewed design, and badges featuring both Kims only recently.

The round designs were the oldest types. The very first round design in 1953 featured Kim Il Sung's side profile in military uniform, much like their Chinese counterparts. Kim's face from the front began to be used in the 1980s. Rectangular badges appeared in the 1970s and were at first reserved for those working in state security organizations. The flag-shaped badges began to be made in the early 1980s. They featured a symbol related to a party, state, or youth organization. The one bearing the emblem of the Workers' Party became the most popular.

After the death of Kim Jong Il in December 2011, party officials started to wear the Kim Jong Il badge next to the Kim Il Sung one. Then, in April 2012, the double badge was reintroduced in its current form.

In June 2024, in photographs from the 10th plenum of the WPK Central Committee, badges depicting only Kim Jong Un were first seen on the jackets of officials, although they had previously depicted previous leaders of the state.

Badges with both leaders have been used by people traveling between regions as an item for bartering in the North Korean gray market. Previously, methamphetamine was used for bartering before various crackdowns made the practice hard. Badges eventually replaced drugs despite falling prices. In Pyongyang, too, where money and prized items are in short supply, the badges have value.

== Wearing ==
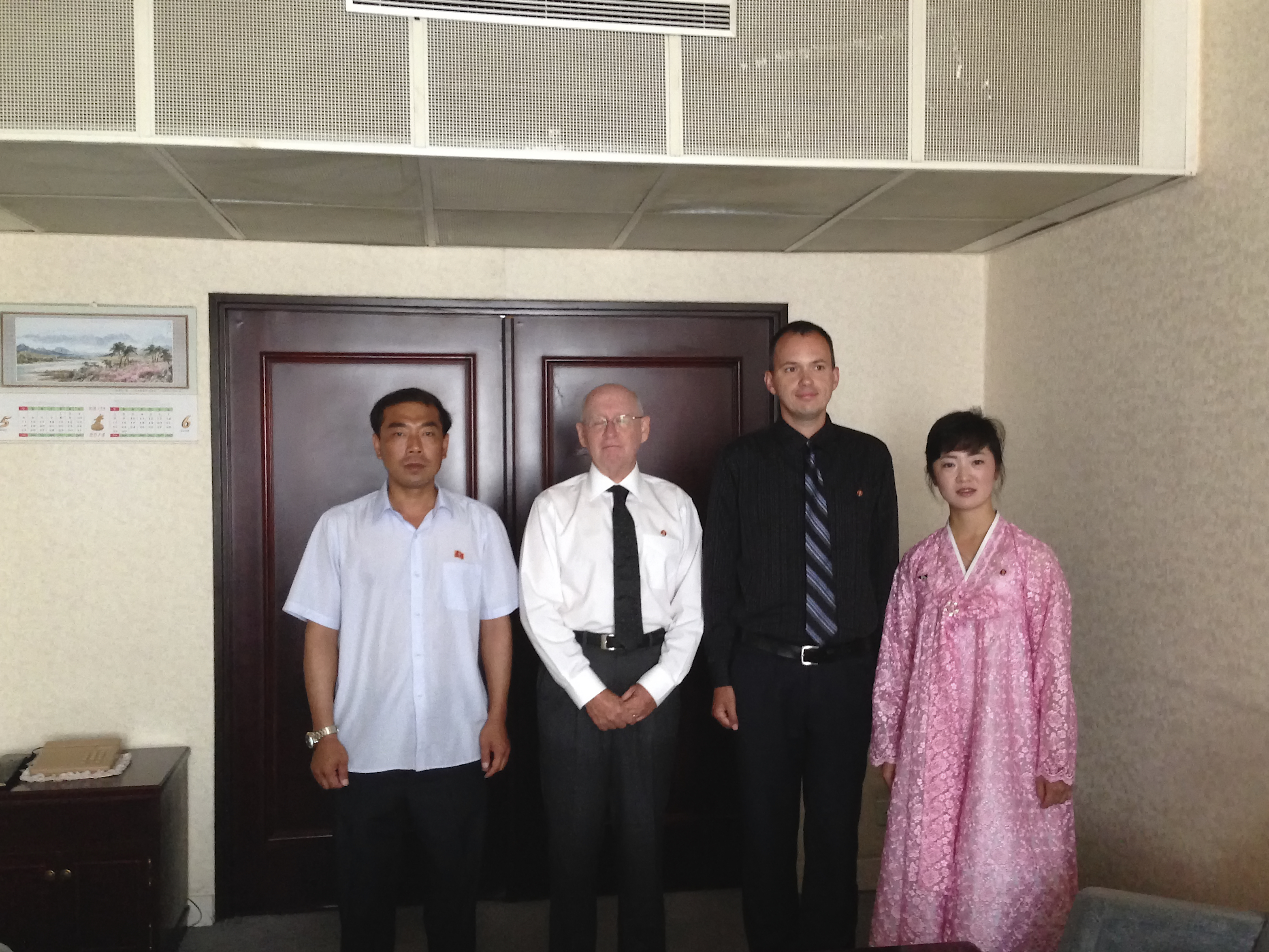
Foreigners being awarded Kim Il Sung badges at the Yanggakdo International Hotel

Virtually all North Koreans wear the badges. North Koreans begin wearing the badges at 16 years old. The badges are placed above their Korean Children's Union badges.

Respect for the badges is enshrined in the Ten Principles for the Establishment of a Monolithic Ideological System, which mandate that they "must be treated with reverence and protected with utmost care". If someone is caught outside their home without a badge, they are faced with explaining themselves at the next mutual criticism session. The badges are given to eligible North Koreans for free, and are acquired through one's workplace or school. Losing, or selling, a badge results in one having to prove that they have lost the badge without a malicious intent before they are given a new one. Lacking a badge has also been associated with transgression because sometimes people who professed "anti-Kim" behavior had their badges confiscated.

A North Korean may own several different badges that they have obtained at different stages of their life, two or three on average, but some have many more.

Badges are known to have been sold to tourists at the Kim Il Sung and Kim Jong Il foundation building in Pyongyang for a 100 Euro 'donation', and after receiving permission and help of a local. Badges have been smuggled out of the country for sale and can be found in Chinese cities in particular, although selling them is illegal in China as well. Both authentic and counterfeit badges are sold in Tumen, Yanbian. Most badges found outside of the country are counterfeits, such as those regularly on sale in Dandong.

The badges are worn on inner garments only, either on the lapel or a shirt, but not on outwear coats. Usually, the badges are worn on the left side of a garment, over the heart. There are atypical ways of wearing the badges that are considered fashionable by North Koreans, the youth in particular. Schoolchildren and teenagers use the badges to "perk up" their uniforms. One such way is to wear the badge at the very edge of one's garment, for which children of upper-class families in Pyongyang in particular are known.

Although it is mandatory and obligatory to wear a badge, North Korean officials sometimes claim that it is done out of pure loyalty. The badges are not worn on some occasions such as entering places of worship.

North Koreans traveling or working abroad almost never wear the badges when not on official business.

== Types ==
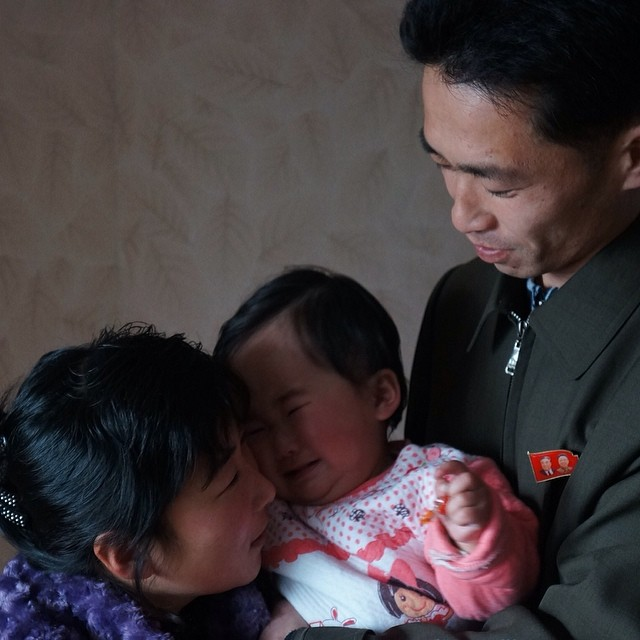
A badge featuring both Kim Il Sung and Kim Jong Il is the most prestigious type. The badges are designed and made by the Mansudae Art Studio.

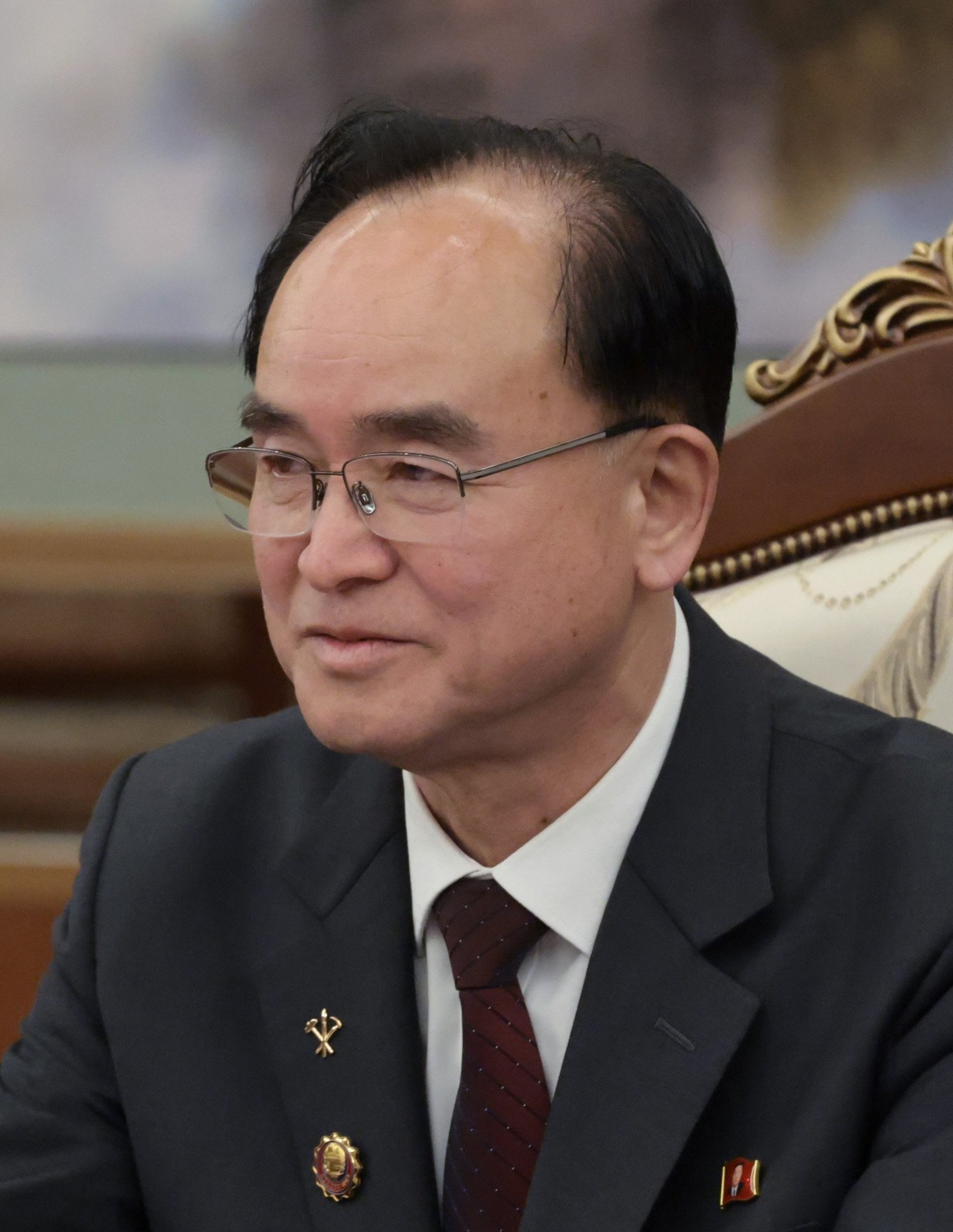
A badge featuring Kim Jong Un worn by Jo Yong-won. Such badges are only given out to high ranking WPK cadres.

The badges come in different shapes and sizes. Unlike in China, where Chairman Mao badges were diverse because their production was not overseen by the government, North Korean badges have relatively little variation. All in all, there are more than 20 different designs. The size, shape, colouring, and type of metal of the design is indicative of the social status and institutional affiliations of the person wearing it. For instance, party youths wear large round badges, whereas common people wear smaller round badges.

While most badges only feature a portrait of Kim Il Sung, there are two exceptions. The most prestigious type has both Kim Il Sung and Kim Jong Il — there are three designs that feature them both: one with the two against a red banner; one with them over a North Korean flag (without a star) worn by high-ranking Chongryon; and one with them on a smaller, more curved flag with the words 청년전위 (meaning "Youth Potential") written under the portraits — this badge is worn by some members of the Socialist Patriotic Youth League. No other designs feature both leaders. The design is reserved to high-level Workers' Party of Korea officials only. It is so rare that seeing one "can send many a minor North Korean bureaucrat into a stupor". The other exception is badges with the portrait of Kim Jong Il only. They are worn by security services cadres and are also considerably rare.

Depending on the badge, the leader is depicted in a Western suit, military attire, or some other type of clothing.

Before Kim Jong Un was confirmed as Kim Jong Il's successor and Kim Jong Chol was groomed as the country's next leader, a limited set of Kim Jong Chol badges were reportedly made and given to cabinet, party, and army officials. Since the Tenth Plenary Meeting of the 8th Central Committee of the Workers' Party of Korea, certain party officials were seen wearing Kim Jong Un badges to the exclusion of the traditional Kim Il Sung and Kim Jong Il badge.

== See also ==
- Chairman Mao badge
- Culture of North Korea
- Kim Il Sung and Kim Jong Il portraits
- List of things named after Kim Il Sung
- Orders and medals of North Korea
- Songbun
- Juche ideology
