= Chairman Mao badge =

Pin badge depicting Mao Zedong

- Typical aluminium and plastic Chairman Mao badge, with a line from Mao's 1962 poem Winter Clouds: "the plum blossom is delighted—the sky is full of snow" (梅花歡喜漫天雪).
- Chinese: 毛主席像章
Transcriptions
Standard Mandarin
- Hanyu Pinyin: Máo zhǔxí xiàngzhāng [mǎʊ ʈʂùɕǐ ɕjâŋʈʂáŋ]
- Gwoyeu Romatzyh: Mau juushyi shianqjang
- Wade–Giles: Máo chǔhsí hsiàngchāng
Yue: Cantonese
- Jyutping: Mou4 zyu2zik6 zoeng6zoeng1
- IPA: [mȍu tɕy̌ːtɕɪ̀k tsœ̀ːŋtsœ̂ːŋ]

Chairman Mao badge (Chinese: 毛主席像章; pinyin: Máo zhǔxí xiàngzhāng) is the name given to a type of pin badge displaying an image of CCP chairman Mao Zedong that was ubiquitous in the People's Republic of China during the active phase of the Cultural Revolution, from 1966 to 1971. The term is also used for badges associated with Mao that do not actually have a picture of him on them. It is estimated that several billion Chairman Mao badges were produced during the period of the Cultural Revolution.

== History ==
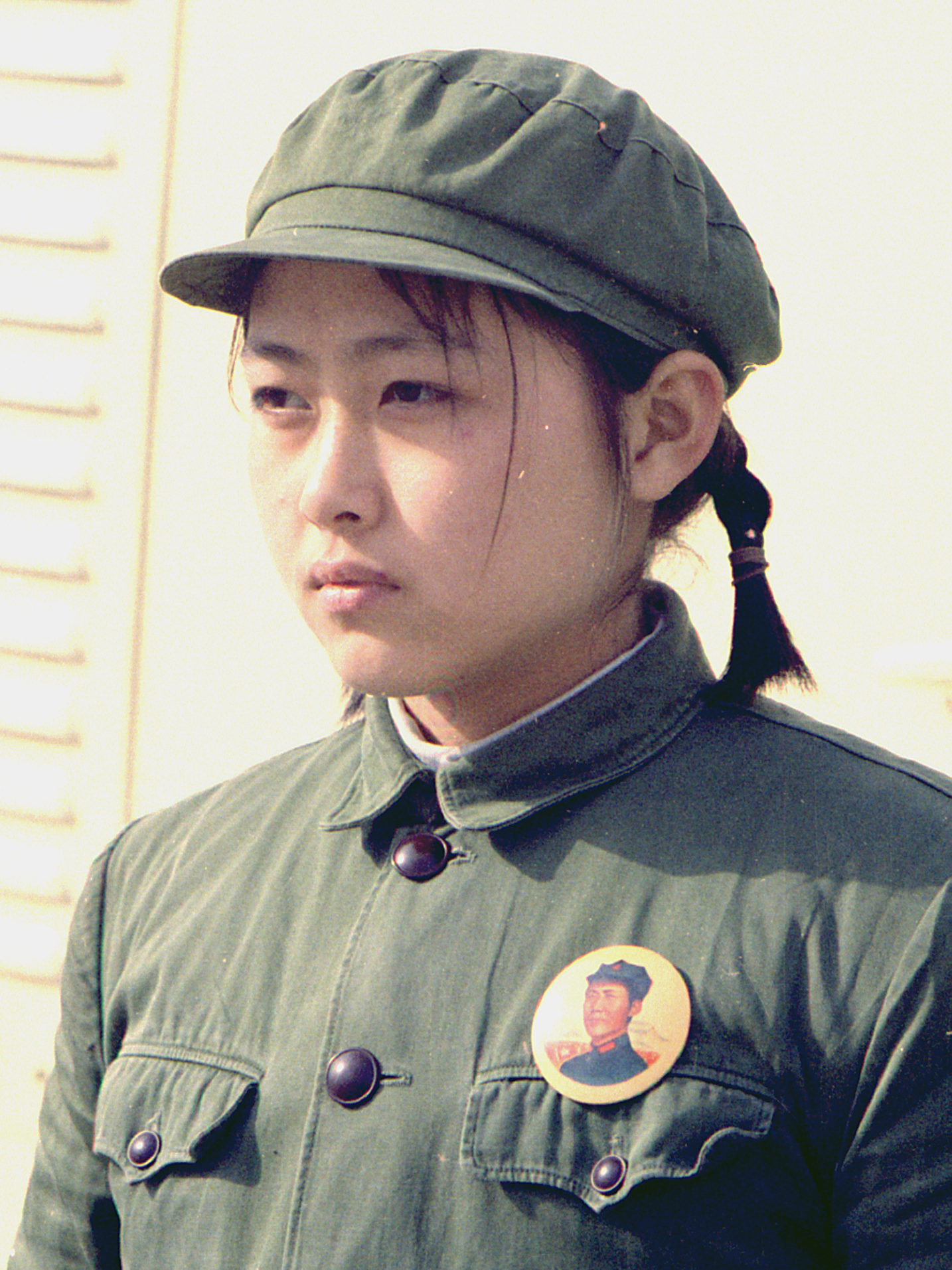
A young girl wearing a Mao suit and a Mao badge on her chest in 1972

Badges depicting Mao Zedong first appeared at the Chinese People's Anti-Japanese Military and Political College (中国人民抗日军事政治大学) at Yan'an during the 1930s. These early badges were homemade, usually being constructed out of the metal from used toothpaste tubes.

By the 1940s badges showing Mao by himself or together with other important people were being produced in small numbers as commemorative medals or as awards for service to the Chinese Communist Party (CCP) or to the army. Unlike the later Cultural Revolution period badges, which normally portrayed Mao by himself, these badges frequently portrayed Mao side by side with other Chinese revolutionary figures such as Zhu De, Chen Yi, He Long, Lin Biao and Lu Xun, or showed Mao with communist leaders from other countries, such as Stalin and Kim Il Sung. During this period badges were smaller but more robust than the Cultural Revolution period badges, and some badges produced during the 1950s were even made of gold (initially 22 carat, but later reduced to 13 or 14 carat).

After the establishment of the People's Republic of China (PRC) in 1949, and throughout the 1950s and early 1960s, badges showing an image of Mao were produced mainly for special occasions, for example Chinese soldiers were given star-shaped badges with a portrait of Mao when they returned to China from the Korean War, and labourers working on the Sichuan-Tibet Highway were given gold-plated copper badges with a bilingual inscription in Chinese and Tibetan on completion of the road in December 1954. By the mid-1960s Mao badges began to become more prevalent, and were even distributed at international events such as the 1965 Leipzig Trade Fair, but it was not until the end of 1965 that small aluminium Mao badges, similar to the Cultural Revolution badges, first started to be produced in Shanghai.

Mao badges exploded in popularity with the launch of the Cultural Revolution in 1966. Almost overnight the function of Mao badges changed completely: what had previously been largely commemorative or ceremonial items worn by a comparative few suddenly became required symbols of loyalty to Mao worn by almost everyone. Along with the "little red book" of Mao's sayings, badges with a portrait of Mao become essential indicators of the wearer's loyalty to Mao, worn on the left side just above the heart. Bigger badges indicated a greater degree of loyalty to Mao, and some even pinned the badges directly into their skin as an extreme indication of their loyalty. Conversely, members of the landowning class and other perceived reactionaries were not allowed to wear Mao badges, with the conspicuous lack of a Mao badge marking them out as enemies of the people.

At the beginning of the Cultural Revolution few ordinary people wore Mao badges in the ordinary course of their daily life, and although production of badges in Shanghai increased steadily from 32,000 in July 1966 to 175,000 the following month, it was only when Mao was presented with some Mao badges by Red Guards at a mass rally at Tiananmen Square on 18 August 1966 that the wearing of these badges became widespread. In September 1966 production of Mao badges in Shanghai soared to 1.3 million, and during the height of the Cultural Revolution, from 1968 to 1971, an estimated total of between 2 and 5 billion Chairman Mao badges were produced throughout the country. Badges were primarily distributed to workers, students and soldiers by their work units, and they were not widely available for purchase at shops. Badges were further distributed by trading between friends or on the black market, and by being given as gifts.

The high tide of Mao badge mania was reached in April 1969, during the 9th CCP National Congress, when huge numbers of Mao badges were produced for distribution at the congress. However, the vast quantities of aluminium being used was having serious repercussions on Chinese industry, causing Mao to demand "Give me back the airplanes" (还我飞机), and in June 1969 the CCP Central Committee issued a document forbidding the production of any more Mao badges unless specially authorized. After the death of Lin Biao in September 1971, the wearing of Mao badges declined rapidly, and few people outside rural areas wore Mao badges in public during the latter part of the Cultural Revolution, from 1972 to 1976. After the fall of the Gang of Four and subsequent end of the Cultural Revolution in October 1976, a month after the death of Mao, work units started to organize the collection and recycling of Mao badges, although many people secretly held on to their badges.

During the 2020 Summer Olympics medal ceremony on 2 August 2021, Chinese cyclists Bao Shanju and Zhong Tianshi, who had won gold at the women's team sprint event, appeared on the podium wearing Mao badges. In response, International Olympic Committee spokesperson Mark Adams said the committee would begin an investigation into the matter, to see if it violated Article 50 of the Olympic Charter which prohibits any kind of demonstration or political, religious and racial propaganda in Olympic venues, and requested the Chinese Olympic Committee to submit a report on the incident. The Chinese Olympic Committee later assured the IOC that this incident would not happen again and stated that it would soon submit a report.

== Impact of the badge ==
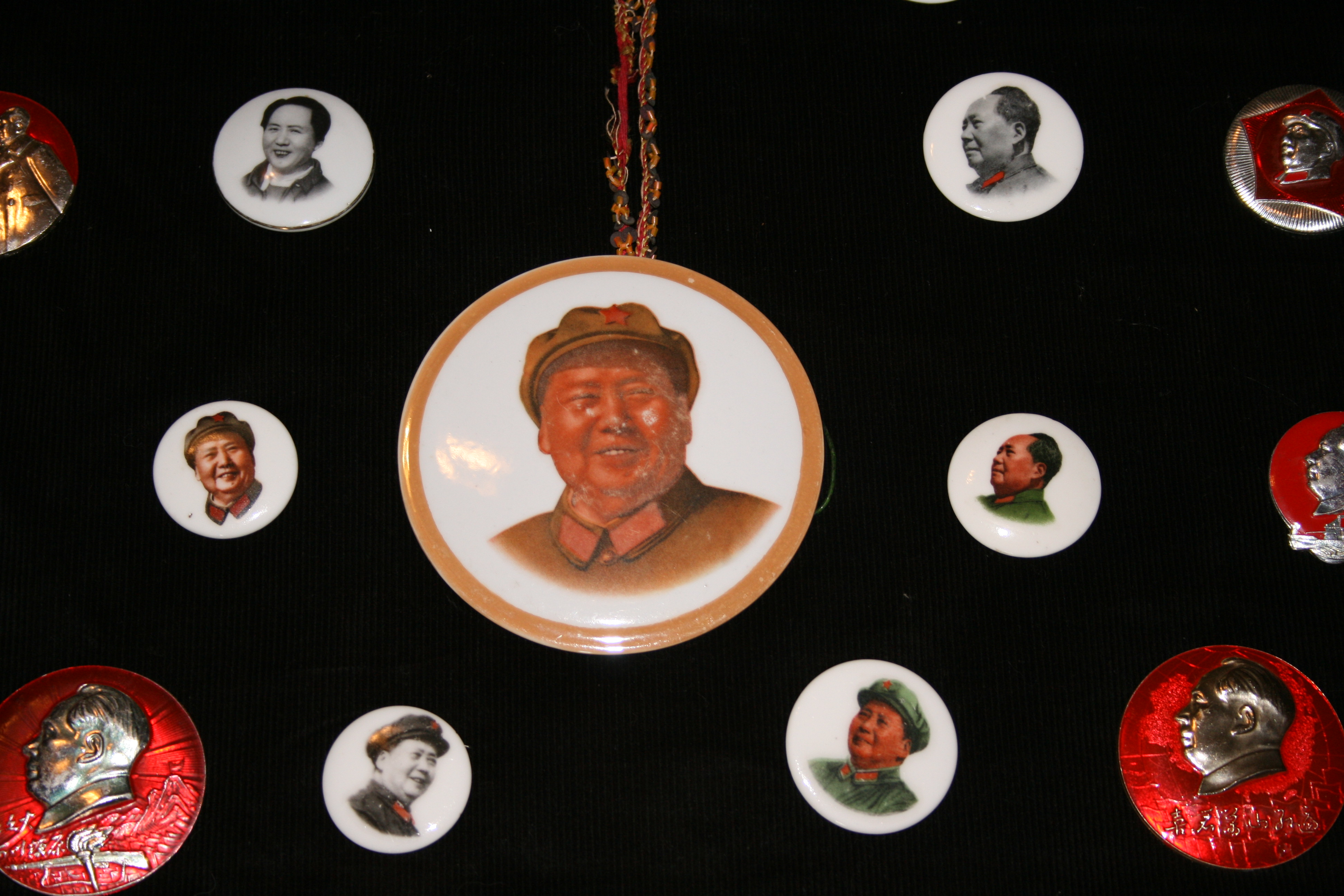
Chairman Mao badges from the Cultural Revolution

The portrait and short slogan on Chairman Mao's badge were designed as a "mobile notice board." This symbolic unified logo effectively expressed the class position and revolutionary identity represented by the wearer. This logo also simplified the complex social contradictions into a binary confrontation pattern of "proletariat and class enemy." The wearer regarded Chairman Mao's badge as a symbol of power and used it to infiltrate class struggle into every corner of daily life. A sense of political ritual was formed everywhere.

Anyone who failed to wear the badge in time or wore a fake badge would be labeled as a bourgeois or alien element by the wearer and criticized. Under this compulsory wearing system, a network of mutual supervision was formed among the masses. In addition, cadres such as the Red Guards and the propaganda team would patrol the streets to check the wearing of the badge; those who failed to display a qualified badge would often be publicly named. This mighty power granted by the party not only strengthened the masses' loyalty to Chairman Mao but also further stimulated the masses' enthusiasm for revolution, which prompted the class confrontation to deepen step by step in daily life.

After the Cultural Revolution, the role of Chairman Mao's badges in daily political rituals gradually declined; however, they remain deeply rooted in the collective memory of Chinese society. Especially after entering the 1990s, with the re-reflection of a generation on the experience of the Cultural Revolution and the curiosity of Western tourists, the Cultural Revolution souvenirs that were initially banned began to reappear in fairs and antique markets. Among them, young people usually collect these badges with a mentality of "nostalgia" or "irony", and even formed a trend. At the same time, many local museums and private collections have held special exhibitions on Chairman Mao's badges, presenting them as political symbols and conducting in-depth research as art and historical materials.

In the academic world, Chairman Mao's badges, as "mobile social texts," have been continuously interpreted after the Cultural Revolution. Academics interpret Mao badges from multiple angles: some scholars focus on their aesthetic and design value, while others explore their emotional resonance in collective memory, and some regard them as the reuse and re-evaluation of totalitarian symbols by the people. In today's Internet age, various badges can still be seen for sale on second-hand trading platforms, with prices ranging from a few dollars to hundreds of dollars. From museum exhibitions to second-hand trading markets, Chairman Mao badges still "circulate" in public and private spaces in contemporary times, reflecting the cross-era appeal and complex connotations of the symbols of the Cultural Revolution.

== Description of badges ==
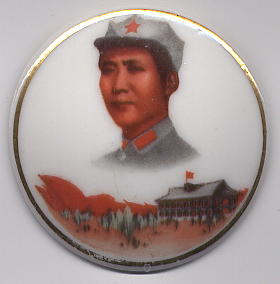
Porcelain badge depicting a young Mao at Yan'an, the portrait based on a photograph taken in 1935.

The typical Chairman Mao badges of the Cultural Revolution period were made from an aluminium base, either coloured gold or left silver, covered with a red plastic pattern, to produce a red and gold or a red and silver design. Other colours were also used sometimes, such as yellow for a field of sunflowers as a background to Mao. In addition to the typical aluminium and plastic badges, badges were also made in other materials, such as porcelain, bamboo, perspex and plastic, but these made up only a tiny fraction of the total number of badges produced. The vast majority of designs have the same profile image of Mao, coloured gold or silver, always looking to the left. The central image of Mao is usually set in a red background, which may be plain or patterned, with or without a border design, and with or without an inscription. Inscriptions vary from a single character (most commonly 忠 zhōng meaning "loyalty") to quotations from Mao or lines of his poetry, or simply slogans such as "the Revolutionary Committee is good" (革命委员会好).

Most badges have an inscription on the reverse, which often recorded where the badge was made and, if appropriate, what special occasion it commemorated. In addition the reverse may also feature a revolutionary slogan, a quotation from Mao, or respectful wishes for long life to Chairman Mao. Thus each obverse design may have hundreds of different varieties with different reverse inscriptions, being produced in different parts of the country or to commemorate different events.

== Classification of badges ==
The British Museum catalogue of Chairman Mao badges classifies the obverse designs of Mao badges from the Cultural Revolution period as follows.

A. Mao profile

- small, round, gold
- small, round, red and gold
- small, rectangular, with inscription/image
- small, rectangular, Selected Works, plastic
- small, diamond/starshaped, red and gold
- small, with Lenin
- small, round, red and gold
- small, rectangular, with inscription/image
- small, round, red and gold, with sunray striations
- round, red and gold
- round, red and gold, with inscription/image
- round, red and gold, with sunray striations
- round, red and gold, with sunray striations (border only)
- round, red and gold, with sunray striations, with inscription/image
- round, red and gold, with sunray striations, with outer border
- red and gold, three sunflowers/hearts/loyalty characters
- red and gold, five sunflowers
- red and gold, seven sunflowers
- red and gold, nine sunflowers
- red and gold, outer border of sunflowers
- red and gold, with Tian'anmen
- red and gold, with Shaoshan
- red and gold, with Jinggangshan
- red and gold, with Zunyi
- red and gold, with Yan'an
- red and gold, with Great Hall of the People
- red and gold, with various revolutionary sites
- red and gold, on map of China
- red and gold, waves/warship
- red and gold, with sunray striations, waves/warship
- red and gold, waves/warship, red flag(s)
- red and gold, with sunray striations, ship approaching
- red, gold and white, lighthouse, globe
- red and gold, with sunray striations, globe
- red and gold, train, red flag(s)

B. Mao in military attire

- Mao profile, round, red and gold, with sunray striations
- Mao profile, star-shaped, red and gold, with sunray striations
- Mao profile, round, red and gold, with inscription/image
- Mao three-quarters, red and gold, with sunray striations
- Mao three-quarters, red, gold and white, warship, red flag
- Mao with cap, Yan'an portrait
- Mao three-quarters with cap, red and gold

C. Mao portraits in civilian attire

- head and neck, open collar
- head and neck
- Beidaihe portrait
- Mao with bamboo hat, wearing jacket
- Mao with bamboo hat, wearing white shirt
- Mao goes to Anyuan portrait
- Mao at the 9th National Congress of the Chinese Communist Party, counting out points on his fingers
- Mao with armband raising his right arm
- Mao in overcoat with seven buttons, raising his right arm
- Mao in overcoat with six buttons, raising his right arm
- Mao with overcoat over his right arm

D. Badges without Mao's portrait

- Small badges without portrait of Mao
- Rectangular badges, red and gold, inscription only

== Collections ==
Even during the Cultural Revolution, Mao badges were extensively collected, traded and given as gifts. However it is unlikely that anyone was able to match the collection of Mao badges that Ye Qun, wife of Lin Biao, managed to put together at the start of the Mao badge craze. She collected several thousand different types of Mao badges to give to Mao on his 73rd birthday on 26 December 1966, although she was unable to achieve the symbolic target of ten thousand badges that she was hoping for.

After the end of the Cultural Revolution upon Mao's death in September 1976, Mao badges were meant to be handed in for recycling, but many or most remained in private ownership. From the mid-1980s Mao memorabilia became very collectible, and Mao badges could be bought at flea markets across China. There are now many private collectors of Mao badges in China, with the most prolific collectors accumulating tens of thousands of specimens. Wang Anting (王安廷) from Chengdu, had a collection of more than 50,000 badges by 2001, and in 2006 Lin Yizhou (林意洲) was reported to have amassed a collection of more than 200,000 badges. The Jianchuan Museum in China has a vast collection of Cultural Revolution material. Outside of China, some museums have started to acquire collections of objects relating to Mao, including badges, and the British Museum in London has a modest but well-catalogued collection of nearly 350 Mao badges.

In 2011, it was reported that a man named Yu Guojie had a collection of over 1.5 million Mao badges, ranging from 1 centimeter in diameter to 1.08 meters in diameter. In 2012, a 30,000-square-meter museum opened to display his collection.

=== In museums ===
Outside of China, there are private and public collections of Mao badges: at the British Museum (London, UK), at the Kulturen Museum (Lund, Sweden), the Thomas Fisher Rare Book Library, University of Toronto, Sumio Sakurai and others.

== See also ==
- Mao Zedong's cult of personality
- Kim Il-sung and Kim Jong-il badges
- Quotations from Chairman Mao Tse-tung

== Sources ==
- Schrift, Melissa (2001). Biography of a Chairman Mao Badge: the Creation and Mass Consumption of a Personality Cult. Rutgers University Press. ISBN 978-0-8135-2937-0.
- Wang, Anting, ed. (1993). 毛泽东像章图谱 [Catalogue of Chairman Mao Badges] (in Chinese). Zhongguo Shudian Chubanshe.
- Wang, Helen (2008). Chairman Mao Badges: Symbols and Slogans of the Cultural Revolution. British Museum Research Publication No.169. British Museum Press. ISBN 978-0-86159-169-5.
- Yuan, Wei, ed. (1997). 中国人民革命军事博物馆藏证章图录 [Illustrated Collections of Badges in the Chinese People's Revolutionary Military Museum] (in Chinese). Shandong Huabao Chubanshe.
