= 2nd Conference of the Workers' Party of Korea =

The 2nd Conference of the Workers' Party of Korea was held in Pyongyang in October 1966. At the time the domestic and international situation of the Korean Workers' Party was complicated by the Sino-Soviet split, which had caused a rift among communist countries and parties. Kim Il Sung delivered the report The Present Situation and the Tasks of Our Party which emphasized unity between socialist countries and within the international communist movement, as well as directing the main blow to United States imperialism, particularly with regard to the Vietnam War. He also emphasized the need for "politico-ideological unity of the revolutionary ranks".

Following the conference, a group called the "Kapsan faction" started voicing opinions critical of Kim Il Sung. The internal differences within the party culminated to a purge called the Kapsan faction incident that left Kim Il Sung's rule unchallenged.

== See also ==
- Ten Principles for the Establishment of a Monolithic Ideological System
