= Kapsan faction incident =

1967 military solstice attempt in North Korea

- Kapsan faction
- Hangul: 갑산파
- Hanja: 甲山派
- RR: Gapsanpa
- MR: Kapsanp'a
- IPA: [kaps͈anpʰa]

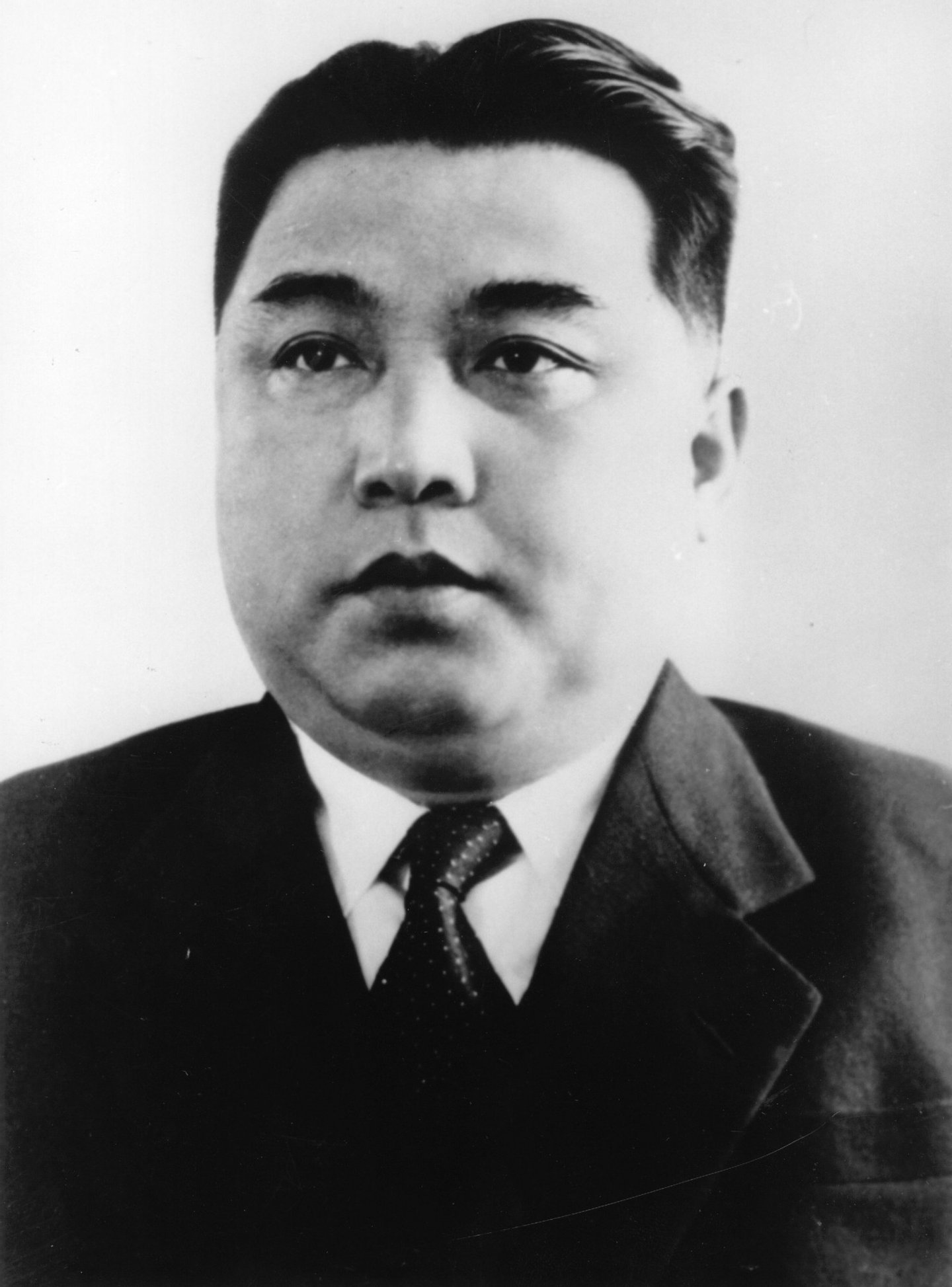
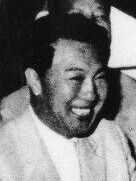
Kim Il Sung and his would-be successor Pak Kum-chol

The Kapsan faction incident (Korean: 갑산파 사건) was an unsuccessful attempt to undermine the power of Kim Il Sung, the leader of North Korea, around 1967. The "Kapsan faction" was a group of veterans of the anti-Japanese struggle of the 1930s and 1940s that was initially close to Kim Il Sung. In the wake of the 2nd Conference of the Workers' Party of Korea (WPK) in 1966, the faction sought to introduce economic reforms, challenge Kim Il Sung's cult of personality, and appoint its leader Pak Kum-chol as his successor.

Kim Il Sung cracked down on the faction in a series of speeches made at party meetings. He called for a "monolithic ideological system" that centered on his personality and rallied party members against the Kapsan faction. By April 1967, the factionalists had disappeared from the public. They were expelled from the party and sent to the countryside or prison. Pak Kum-chol either committed suicide or was executed, and other key members of the faction died as well. Kim Il Sung had his brother and heir apparent at that time, Kim Yong-ju, pen the Ten Principles for the Establishment of a Monolithic Ideological System. This new set of policies made Kim Il Sung's rule unchallengeable and expanded his cult of personality to cover other members of the Kim family.

His son Kim Jong Il took part in the purges and took over the party's Propaganda and Agitation Department (PAD) in what was the first political task delegated to him by his father, paving the way to his increasingly influential role in the politics of the country, eventually culminating in his succeeding his father upon the latter's death in 1994.

== Background ==
The Kapsan faction incident takes its name from the region of Kapsan in the old South Hamgyong Province (present day Ryanggang Province), home to an underground liberation organization during the anti-Japanese struggle called the Kapsan Operation Committee (갑산공작위원회; 甲山工作委員會). Members of this group provided logistical support for Kim Il Sung's fight against the Japanese. Following the liberation of Korea, they were counted among the ranks of Kim's Guerrilla faction of the Workers' Party of North Korea. The origins of the group are so tied up with Kim Il Sung's activities that sometimes the entire guerrilla faction is called the Kapsan faction. Gradually, the faction became seen as distinct from the rest of the guerrilla faction due to political differences. Kim had ousted other factions of the party in a series of purges in the 1950s, most notably the August faction incident in 1956, but the Kapsan faction remained. In the aftermath of the 2nd Conference of the Workers' Party of Korea (WPK) in 1966, the Kapsan faction started setting forth its grievances.

The faction put forward economic policies that disagreed with Kim Il Sung's economic model. They were particularly opposed to Kim's Byungjin (dual-track) line of simultaneously developing the economy and the army, favoring the national economy over the needs of the military. In particular, they favored light over heavy industry in order to funnel funds away from the military and improve people's standard of living. They wanted the ruling WPK to relegate its role in economic planning to experts in economics, science, and engineering. They also favored an economic theory of value and advocated the adoption of a semi-currency to give material incentives to workers.

The main issue, however, was the question of who could succeed Kim Il Sung as the leader of North Korea. Kim had promoted his younger brother Kim Yong-ju as a likely successor, but the man lacked credentials. In particular, he had not taken part in the fight against the Japanese like the guerrilla and Kapsan faction members had. He was criticized for this by the leader of the Kapsan faction, Pak Kum-chol, who had risen in rank to become the vice premier of the state and the fourth-highest-ranking member of the party. Pak was annoyed by the ballooning cult of personality of Kim Il Sung and how it neglected the experiences of people like him who had sacrificed a lot to the country during the liberation. Pak gathered many influential supporters, including Yi Hyo-sun, Kim To-man, Pak Yong-guk, Ho Sok-son, Ko Hyok, Ha Ang-chon, and Rim Chun-chu.

The Kapsan faction sought to name Pak the successor of Kim Il Sung. As an initial move, they helped Kim Il Sung purge Kim Chang-nam, a prominent political theorist, but only to make room for Pak. The faction members started exalting Pak's words as "teachings" equal to those of Kim Il Sung. Memoirs of members of the original Kapsan faction had been published since the early 1960s, starting with Pak Tal in 1963 and followed by Yi Je-sun, brother of Yi Hyo-sun, in 1964. An album from 1964 had Pak Tal and Pak Kum-chol's photos printed next to that of Kim Il Sung. When Pak Kum-chol's wife Choe Chae-ryon died, Kim To-man, who was the Director of the Propaganda and Agitation Department (PAD) of the party, produced a work called An Act of Sincerity – described variously as either a film or a stage play – that portrayed her devotion to her husband. Kim Il Sung disapproved of it and implied that it exhibited misplaced loyalty. Kim To-man also had Pak's birthplace rebuilt. An unauthorized biography on Pak was apparently made while dissemination of propaganda materials on Kim Il Sung was neglected. These actions were perceived as ultimate acts of disloyalty toward Kim Il Sung.

Pak was soon condemned by Choe Yong-gon, chairman of the Standing Committee of the Supreme People's Assembly (SPA), of proliferating "feudal, Confucian ideas". Pak was accused of not supporting the party's military line; he openly ridiculed Kim Il Sung's slogan "one against a hundred" by concluding that a literal interpretation of it could not be true. Production plans that were his responsibility, it was said, were not met. Pak was accused of promoting the old Kapsan Operation Committee members into important posts. The faction, it was claimed, was familialist and regionalist. Pak's ally Yi Hyo-sun, director of the General Bureau of South Korean Affairs, was blamed for failures of covert operations in South Korea. Furthermore, his subordinate Rim Chun-chu was said to have neglected South Korean operations in order to concentrate on publishing a novel. The factionalists were also said to be "revisionists" and having forced people to read "feudalist" literature from the time of the Joseon period. These actions, without the approval of Kim Il Sung, were seen as serious acts of undermining his cult of personality and authority. The faction was also seen as pro-Chinese, contrary to the pro-Moscow line of Kim.

== Incident ==
Kim Il Sung perceived the Kapsan faction's ideas and actions as existential threats to his rule and the state. In March 1967, Kim warned the Kapsan faction members in a speech entitled "On Improving Party Work and Implementing the Decisions of the Party Conference" (당 사업을 개선하고 당대회 결정을 관철할데 대하여) and accused them of practicing "individual heroism". Kim's solution to the problem was a "monolithic ideological system" that rallied the party around him. Kim warned other party officials not to side with the factionalists. The faction members ignored his warnings and held their course. Kim acquired permission from his loyal party members in a secret meeting to remove the Kapsan faction. A wide purge of both real and presumed members ensued. At the fifteenth plenum of the fourth Central Committee of the WPK, on 4–8 April, Kim had more than 100 faction members formally expelled from the party. Pak Kum-chol was sent to work in a factory in the countryside. He was either executed or committed suicide in May 1967. Others were charged with crimes and disappeared from public or were sent to prison camps. Yi Hyo-sun, Kim To-man, Pak Yong-guk, and Ho Sok-son were sentenced to death.

On 25 May, Kim held a speech to party ideological apparatchiks entitled "On the Immediate Tasks in the Direction of the Party's Propaganda Work" (당면한 당선전사업방향에 대하여). The speech, possibly the most important one he ever gave, became known as the "May 25 Teaching" and would become a political tool for Kim's supporters to expose factional elements in the party. So profound was its impact that Song Hye-rang, Kim Jong Il's sister-in-law, characterized 25 May as "the day everything changed" in North Korea. Researcher Fyodor Tertitskiy compares it to the importance of 18 December 1865 to American history, 24 March 1933 to German history, or 20 February 1956 to Soviet history. Despite the importance of the speech, it has never been made public, access being limited to WPK members. A laconic mention of the speech is given in the 1968 Korean Central Yearbook: "1967, May 25–Respected Comrade Kim Il-sung gave a speech to a group of the Party ideological workers named 'On the Immediate Tasks in the Directions of the Party's Propaganda Work.'" Thereafter, for decades – until the Kim Jong-il era – the speech was neither mentioned by name or quoted. It is sometimes confused with another speech that has the same date and is widely available called "On the Problem of Transition from Capitalism to Socialism and of the Dictatorship of the Proletariat". As for the unavailable May 25 Teaching speech, its contents can be accurately inferred from the following extract of a 2008 official biography of Kim, according to Tertitskiy:

In the speech given on May 25th of the 56th year of Juche era (1967), the Great Leader said that the ideological poison of the bourgeois and revisionist elements are bourgeois ideology, revisionist ideology, ideology of flunkeyism, and the feudal Confucian ideas of Confucius and Mencius and showed that these ideas are the root of their core ideology. This ideological venom was left unattended for several years and thus the struggle to cleanse it off will also take a long time and must be conducted steadily and vigorously. The Leader taught that in this struggle we should be cautious about administrative methods and thoroughly accomplish the merging of the ideological education and of the ideological struggle.

The Great Leader divided the followers of the bourgeois and revisionist elements into several categories and set up the guideline that since we had failed to properly establish monolithic ideological system of the Party and the revolutionary worldview, those who had thought that everything had commanded by the leadership was right and had been blindly following [the factionalists] must be thoroughly educated and those who were wavering ideologically and had been dancing to their fiddle should be reformed through ideological struggle.

The Great Leader instructed all the cadres and the Party members to learn well about the nature and the harmful consequences of the bourgeois and revisionist elements' criminal activity and their cunning tricks, and to fully understand the necessity, nature, assignments and methods of implementation of the monolithic ideological system of the Party.

Tertitskiy dates the selection of Kim Jong Il as the successor on the date of the speech. Indeed, Kim Jong Il took part in investigating the faction. The task was delegated to him by Kim Il Sung. Kim Jong Il was only 26 at the time and it was the first official duty given to him by his father. When Kim Jong Il gave a speech at the plenum, it was his first as a figure of authority. He possibly gave another one on 25 May – entitled "Let Us Firmly Establish the Monolithic Ideological System of the Party among the Officials Dealing with Foreign Affairs" (외교일군들속에서 당의 유일사상체계를 굳건히 세우자) – that closely echoed his father's 25 May Teaching. Kim Jong Il's name was mentioned in public documents, possibly for the first time, indicating that he was already on his way to being the heir-apparent to Kim Il Sung. Six months after the purge, at an unscheduled meeting of the party, Kim Il Sung called for loyalty in the film industry that had betrayed him with An Act of Sincerity. Kim Jong Il himself announced that he was up to the task and thus begun his influential career in film-making. Kim left the party's Organization and Guidance Department to take over PAD which had been tarnished in the incident. He gave his support for establishing a monolithic ideology centered around his father alone. Kim called a month-long conference of filmmakers to re-orient the country's film industry by cleansing it from the "poison" of the Kapsan faction. By 1969, the purges were over.

== Aftermath and legacy ==
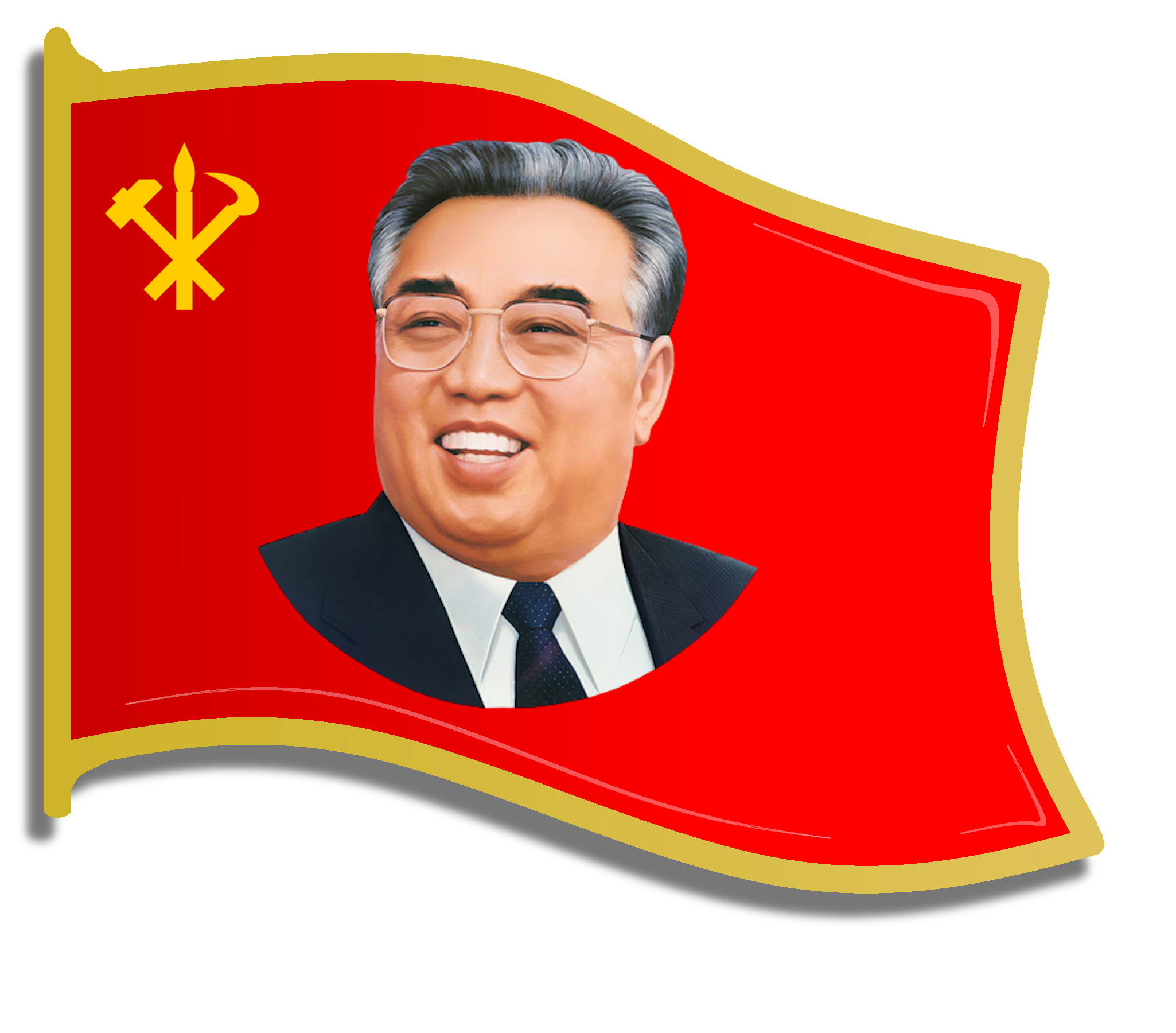
A modern Kim Il Sung badge

The Kapsan faction incident was, in the words of scholar Lim Jae-cheon, "a watershed moment in North Korean politics". It marked the last credible challenge to Kim Il Sung's position. Once the faction had been removed, Kim's grip on power hardened and his cult of personality intensified. What followed was an upsurge in propaganda similar to that in China during the Cultural Revolution. Kim Il Sung badges were introduced and it became mandatory to quote Kim in public meetings. All hitherto published books were inspected for correctness and many volumes were burnt. Soon after the incident, Kim Yong-ju, Kim Il Sung's brother, codified his rule in the influential Ten Principles for the Establishment of a Monolithic Ideological System. Kim Il Sung announced the principles to the public in a speech held at the SPA on 16 December 1967 entitled "Let Us Embody the Revolutionary Spirit of Independence, Self-Sustenance, and Self-Defense More Thoroughly in all Branches of State Activity" (국가활동의 모든 부문에서 자주, 자립, 자위의 혁명정신을 더욱 철저히 구현하자). After the incident, the Korean word for leader, suryong, which had been used for the leader of any group, or for Lenin or Stalin, came to exclusively mean Kim Il Sung.

Kim's 25 May speech had the effect of establishing his own theoretical position distinct from that of China or the Soviet Union, granting him political independence from the two socialist great powers. His political ideology of Juche began to gradually gain momentum. His Byungjin economic line took hold, although in reality it meant privileging the army over the economy. Following personnel replacements, North Korea's policy towards South Korea became more hard-line, too.

With the downfall of the Kapsan faction, Kim Il Sung became the singular focus of North Korean historiography. His role during the liberation was exaggerated to mythical proportions. Experiences of other guerrilla fighters, on the other hand, were no longer publicly remembered. For instance, Kim Jong Il had the conspirators' war memoirs removed from a popular collection called Reminiscences of the Anti-Japanese Guerillas. Kim Jong Il himself was thrust into the center of political life alongside his father. The cult of personality began to focus on other members of the Kim family as well. The first figure the cult was extended to was his mother, Kang Pan Sok. In July 1967, a song entitled "Mother of Korea" praising her was published. In July and September Rodong Sinmun published articles praising Kang. September also saw a campaign to emulate Kang in the Korean Democratic Women's Union. By 1968, the North Korean cult of personality was complete.

As another family matter, Kim Il Sung was reluctant to allow his daughter Kim Kyong-hui to marry Jang Song-thaek, the son of a family with revolutionary traditions, whose credentials were now no longer seen as an advantage. The two married in 1972, but Jang's past could not be discussed publicly. It was through Jang that the legacy of the Kapsan faction incident carried over to the Kim Jong Un era. In 2013, he had Jang purged and executed. Kim, like his grandfather Kim Il Sung, called his military-economic policy Byungjin, and the Ten Principles for the Establishment of a Monolithic Ideological System were updated to refer to Kim Jong Un. Stephan Haggard concludes that while "Kim Jong Un's byungjin line is not exactly Kim Il Sung's and Jang Song Thaek is not the Kapsan faction ... the underlying dynamics do look somewhat similar: challenges to the leaderist system are met not only with purges but with important ideological justifications for unity and obedience."

== See also ==
- 1967 in North Korea
- Cultural Revolution
- History of the Workers' Party of Korea
- Kim Il Sung bibliography
- On Eliminating Dogmatism and Formalism and Establishing Juche in Ideological Work
- Workers' Party of North Korea § Factionalism

== Sources ==
- Ahn Hae-kyun (1975–1976). "Thirty Years of Politics in North Korea: Some Characteristics of Changing Patterns of Control in the North Korean Political Process". The Korean Journal of International Studies. 7 (1): 7–21. ISSN 0377-0451.
- Armstrong, Charles K. (2013). The North Korean Revolution, 1945–1950. Ithaca: Cornell University Press. ISBN 978-0-8014-6880-3.
- Cha, John H.; Sohn, K. J. (2012). Exit Emperor Kim Jong-Il: Notes from His Former Mentor. Bloomington: Abbott Press. ISBN 978-1-4582-0217-8.
- "Daily Report: East Asia". Daily Report. East Asia. Index. 68 (77). Washington, D.C.: Foreign Broadcast Information Service. 15 April 1993. ISSN 1045-2192.
- "Korea". Encyclopaedia Britannica. Vol. 13. Chicago: Encyclopaedia Britannica. 1973. ISBN 978-0-85229-173-3.
- Haggard, Stephan (19 December 2013). "Monolithic Ideological System Update". North Korea: Witness to Transformation. Peterson Institute for International Economics.
- Hamm, Taik-Young (2012). Arming the Two Koreas: State, Capital and Military Power. London: Routledge. ISBN 978-1-134-62066-1.
- Hoare, James E. (2012). "Kapsan Faction". Historical Dictionary of Democratic People's Republic of Korea. Lanham: Scarecrow Press. pp. 200–201. ISBN 978-0-8108-7987-4.
- Lim Jae-Cheon (2008). Kim Jong-il's Leadership of North Korea. New York: Routledge. ISBN 978-1-134-01712-6.
- — (2015). Leader Symbols and Personality Cult in North Korea: The Leader State. New York: Taylor & Francis. ISBN 978-1-317-56740-0.
- Lynn, Hyung Gu (2007). Bipolar Orders: The Two Koreas since 1989. London: Zed Books. ISBN 978-1-84277-743-5.
- Myers, B. R. (2015). North Korea's Juche Myth. Busan: Sthele Press. ISBN 978-1-5087-9993-1.
- Person, James F. (14 December 2013). "The 1967 Purge of the Gapsan Faction and Establishment of the Monolithic Ideological System". North Korea International Documentation Project. Wilson Center.
- Ra Jong-yil (2019). Inside North Korea's Theocracy: The Rise and Sudden Fall of Jang Song-thaek. Translated by Jinna Park. Albany: State University of New York Press. ISBN 978-1-4384-7373-4.
- "Review: A Quarterly Journal for the Study of Communism and Communist Countries [Issues 16–27]". Review: A Quarterly Journal for the Study of Communism and Communist Countries (16–27). 1968. ISSN 0047-1747.
- Seth, Michael J. (2018). North Korea: A History. Dordrecht: Macmillan International Higher Education. ISBN 978-1-352-00219-5.
- Sohn Gwang Joo (22 June 2015). "Power slipping through Kim Jong Un's fingers?". Daily NK.
- Tertitskiy, Fyodor (19 February 2014). "Back to the Primary Source: Hunting for Kim Il-sung's 'May 25th Instructions'". Sino-NK.
- — (2017a). "1967: Transition to Absolute Autocracy in North Korea". In Cathcart, Adam; Winstanley-Chesters, Robert; Green, Christopher K. (eds.). Change and Continuity in North Korean Politics. New York: Routledge. pp. 82–94. ISBN 978-1-138-68168-2.
- — (24 May 2017b). "The 1967 speech that set North Korean totalitarianism in stone". NK News.
