= List of things named after Kim Il Sung =

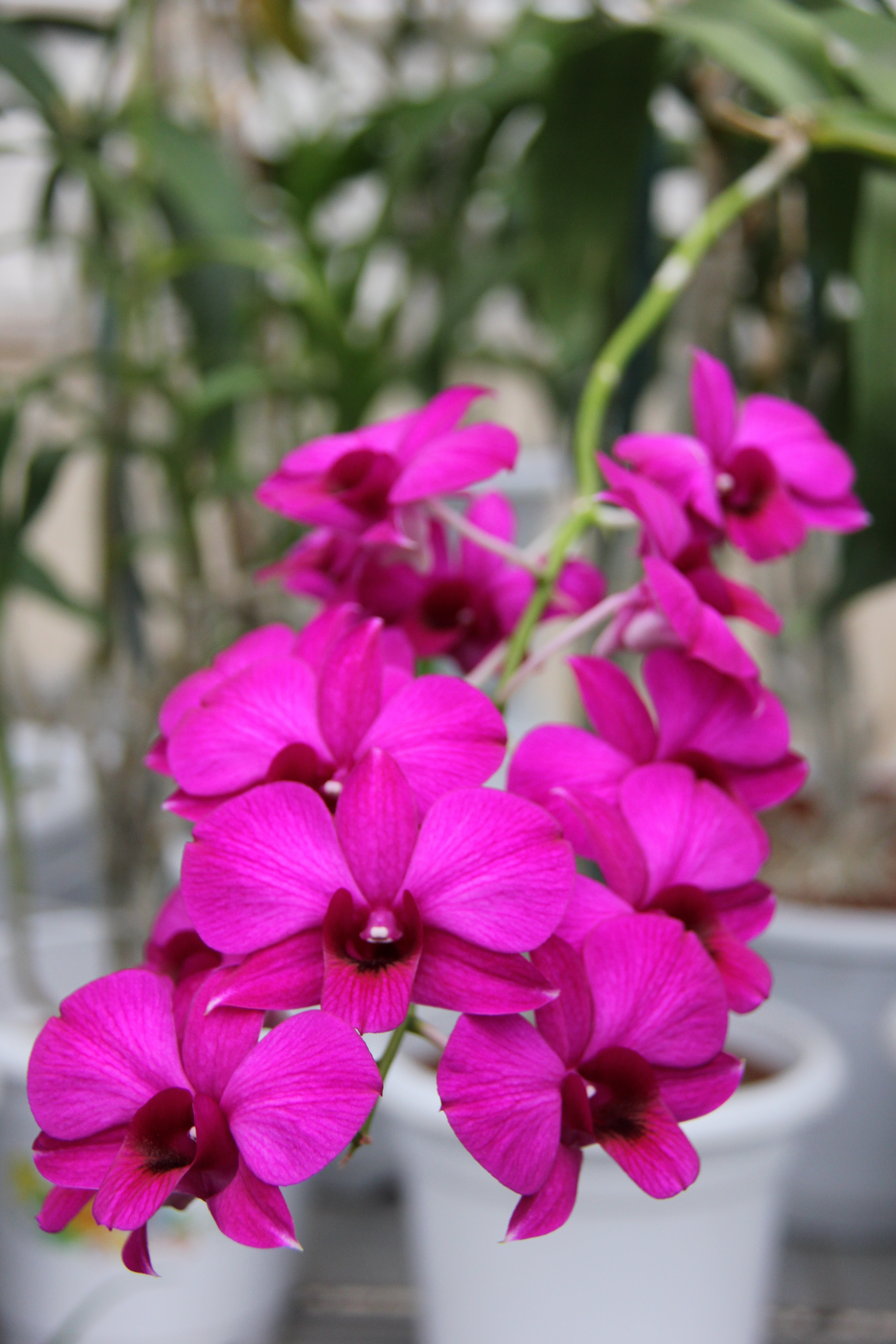
Kimilsungia is the namesake flower of Kim Il Sung.

Kim Il Sung was the founder and first leader of North Korea. Jane Portal, the author of Art Under Control in North Korea, assesses that: "[i]t is probably the case that Kim Il-sung [had] more buildings named after him during his lifetime than any other leader in history". North Korea claims that "[m]ore than 480 streets, institutions and organizations in 100 countries were named after Kim Il Sung". Since Kim Il Sung's name Il-sung (Korean: 일성; Hancha: 日成) can mean "the Sun", many things named after him are actually called this way.

== List ==
=== Education and research ===
- Kim Il Sung College for Physics (김일성고등물리학교) – located in Pochon County, Ryanggang Province and named to commemorate the 1937 Battle of Pochonbo
- Kim Il Sung Military University – school for selected commissioned officers.
- Kim Il Sung University – called that since it opened in 1946
- Kim Il Sung University of Politics
- Kim Il Sung Open University
- Kim Il Sung Higher Party School – the country's top school for the selected few
- Kim Il Sung Research Institute of Agricultural Science – in Guinea
- "Kim Il Sung Research Institute" – generic name for classrooms in large elementary schools dedicated to studying Kim Il Sung
- Research Center for Comrade Kim Il Sung's Revolutionary Thoughts (김일성동지혁명사상연구실) – formerly the Research Center for Workers' Party of Korea History
- Kim Il Sung Library – in Mogadishu, Somalia
- Kim Il Sung Library – in Sofia, Bulgaria
- I.P.U. Kim Il Sung in Havana, Cuba

=== Museums ===
- South Hamgyong Museum of the Revolutionary Activities of Comrade Kim Il Sung (함경남도김일성동지혁명사적관) – in Hamhung, South Hamgyong Province
- Sinuiju Museum of the Revolutionary Activities of Comrade Kim Il Sung – in Sinuiju, North Pyongan Province
- South Pyongan Museum of the Revolutionary Activities of Comrade Kim Il Sung – in Pyongsong, South Pyongan Province
- Kim Il Sung Revolutionary Museum – in Chongjin
- Chagang Provincial Comrade Kim Il Sung Revolutionary Museum – in Chagang Province
- Museum of President Kim Il Sung's Revolutionary Activities – in Wonsan, Kangwon Province
- Museum of President Kim Il Sung's Revolutionary Activities – in Ryanggang Province

=== Streets, squares and parks ===
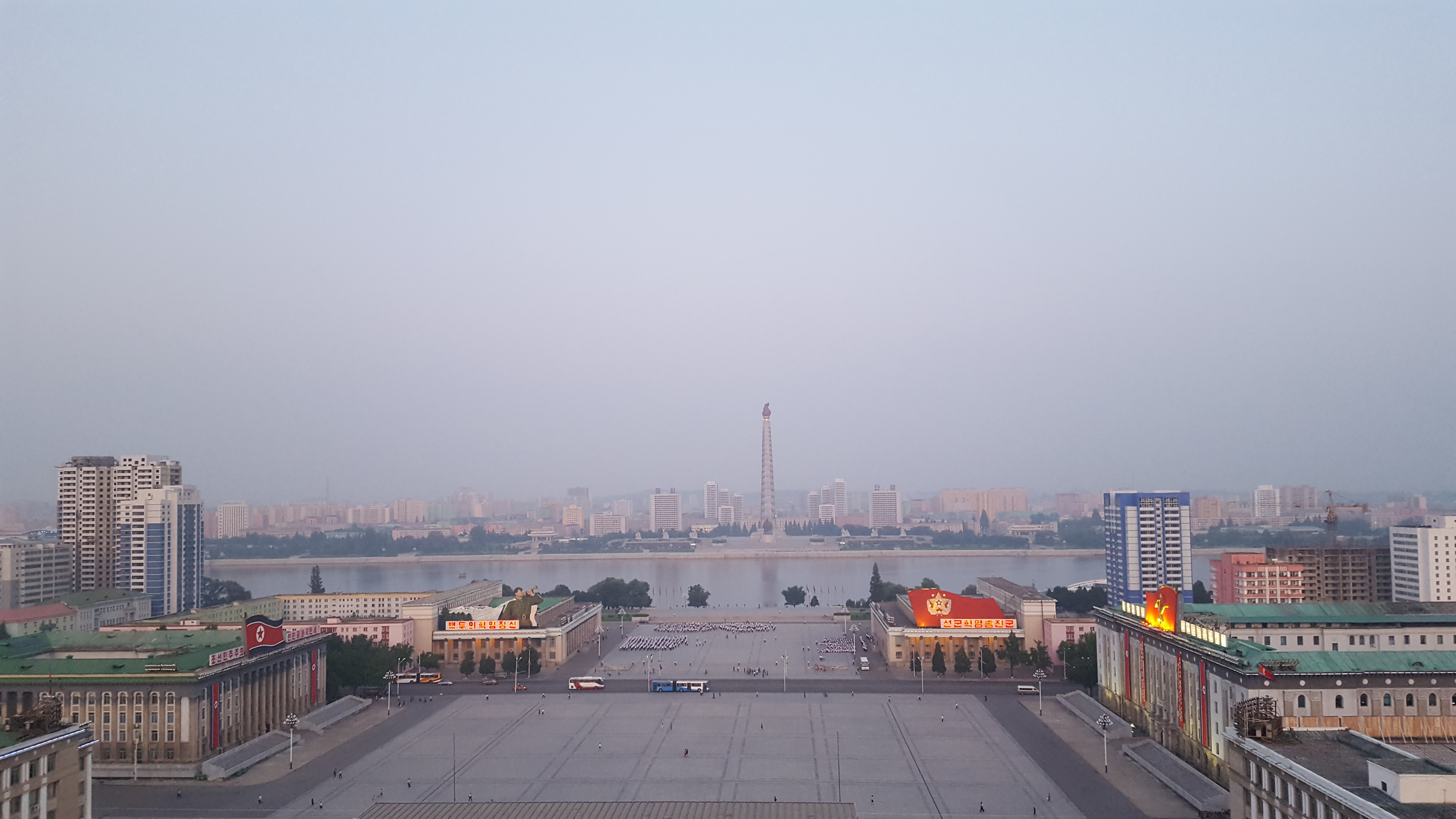
Kim Il Sung Square in the centre of Pyongyang

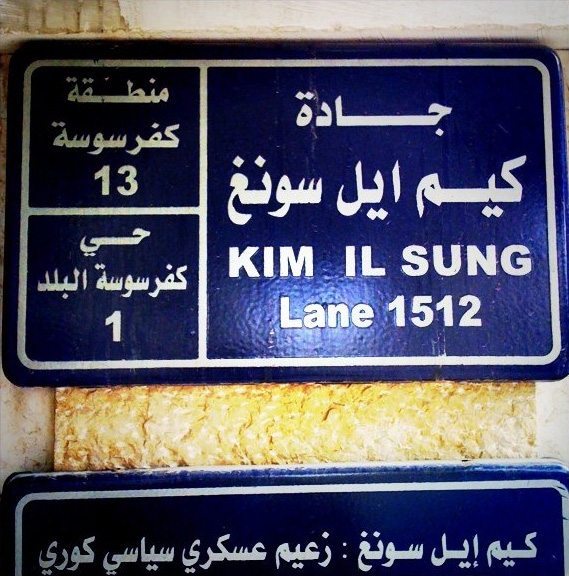
"Kim Il Sung Lane" in Damascus is one of as many as 450 streets around the world named after the North Korean president (according to claims by North Korea).

- Kim Il Sung Square, Pyongyang, North Korea
- Several streets in foreign countries. North Korea claims 450 in 100 countries. There is a "Kim Il Sung Street" or equivalent in:
  - Hamhung, North Korea
  - Maputo, Mozambique
  - Phnom Penh, Cambodia
  - Damascus, Syria
- Kim Il Sung Park in Damascus, Syria. Inaugurated in 2015.

=== Awards ===
- Kim Il Sung Award
- Kim Il Sung Medal
- Kim Il Sung Prize
- International Kim Il Sung Prize
- Order of Kim Il Sung
- Kim Il Sung Youth Honor Prize
- Kim Il Sung Children Honor Prize

=== Other ===
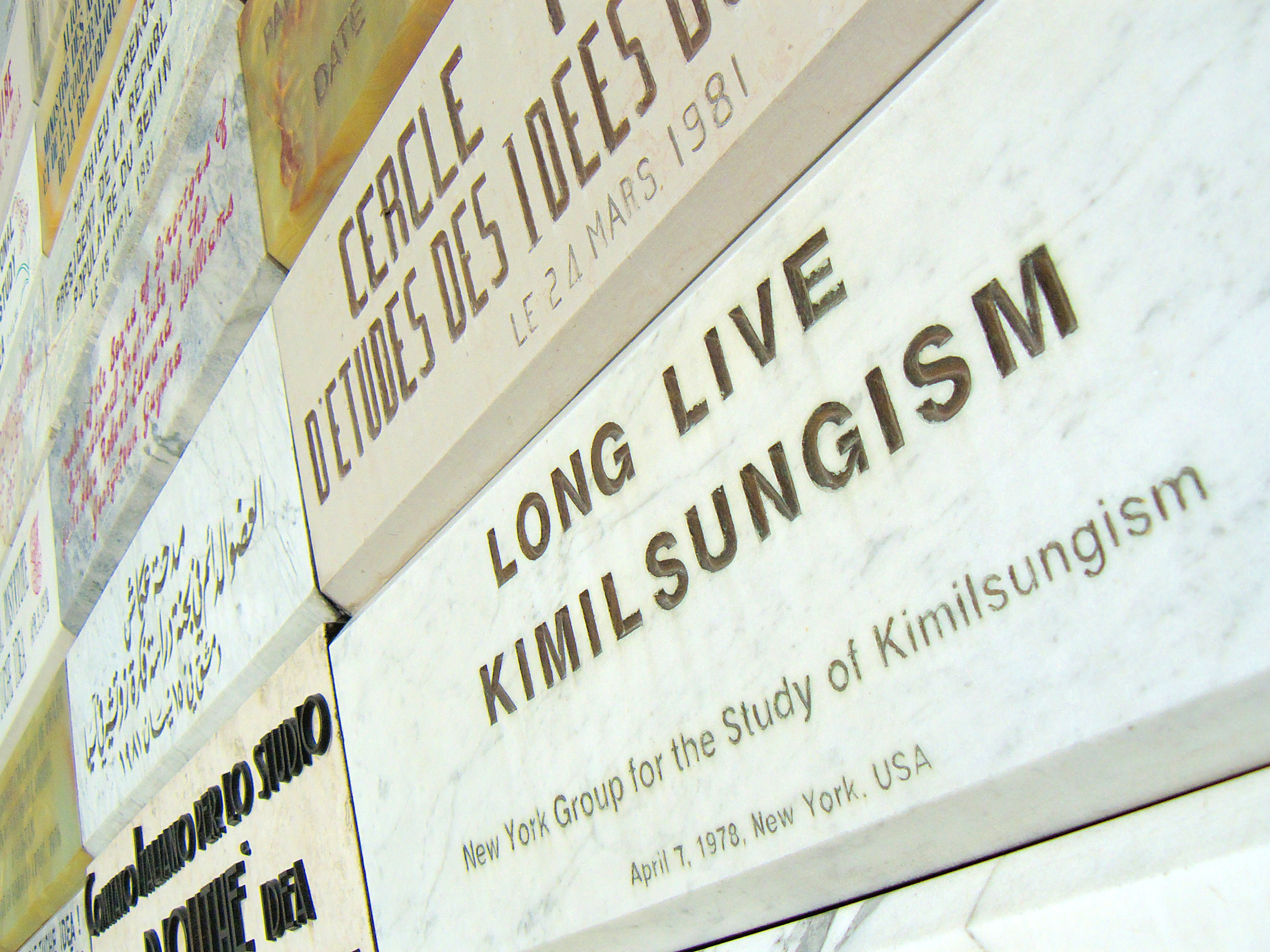
A plaque dedicated to "Kimilsungism" at the Juche Tower

- "Song of General Kim Il Sung" – composed by Kim Won-gyun in 1946, its lyrics are carved in stones across the country
- Kim Il Sung Stadium – formerly Pyongyang Municipal Stadium
- "Kimilsungism" – guiding ideology of the country, containing the Juche idea, officially reorganised as "Kimilsungism" in 1974
- Kimilsungia – an orchid presented to Kim Il Sung by Indonesia's leader Sukarno in 1965 and named after Kim when introduced to North Korea in 1977
- Kim Il Sung Socialist Youth League – named by Kim Jong Il in 1996 after Kim Il-sung's death two years earlier, subsequently renamed Kimilsungist-Kimjongilist Youth League in 2016, then the Socialist Patriotic Youth League in 2021
- "Kim Il Sung Constitution" – name of the 1998 constitution, that made Kim Il Sung the Eternal President of the country after his death
- "Kimilsungism-Kimjongilism" - guiding ideology of the party since 2012, named after Kim Il Sung and Kim Jong Il
- "Kim Il Sung and Kim Jong ll Constitution" - name of the current constitution introduced in 2012, made Kim Jong Il Eternal Chairman of the National Defence Commission after his death

=== Named after the Sun ===
- Day of the Sun – designated in 1997 after a three-year mourning period following the death of Kim Il Sung
- Kumsusan Palace of the Sun - mausoleum where Kim Il Sung and Kim Jong Il lie in state

=== Proposed namings ===
- "Kim Il Sung City" – proposed name for Pyongyang after Kim Il Sung's death. Another proposal was to name Pyongyang "Kim Jong Il City" and name Seoul "Kim Il Sung City" once reunification would be attained.

== See also ==
- Kim Il Sung bibliography
- Kim Il Sung and Kim Jong Il badges
- National symbols of North Korea
- List of things named after Fidel Castro
- Awards and decorations received by Kim Il Sung
