= Inminban =

Cooperative local organization in North Korea

Inminban (Korean: 인민반; Hancha: 人民班; RR: inmin-ban; MR: inmin-ban; meaning "neighborhood units" or "people's units") is a neighborhood watch-like form of cooperative local organization in North Korea. Almost no North Korean person exists outside the inminban system; with the exception of active-duty military personnel and some other exempt groups of people, everyone is a member. An inminban is a group of households in a particular place of residence headed by a designated person called an inminbanjang. The tasks of the inminban system are surveillance of the population, organizing labor mobilizations, and neighborhood maintenance.

== History ==
The inminban network grew out of the aegukban, or "patriotic groups" system, which was introduced by the Japanese in colonial Korea in 1940. The duties of the aegukban included pro-Japanese education, neighborhood maintenance, managing food rationing, and coordinating labor mobilizations. After the end of Japanese rule, the aegukban were reconstituted as the inminban in North Korea. Surviving documents from the 1940s indicate that inminban groups were often created by merely changing the names of existing aegukban groups. The aegukban also survived in South Korea as "citizen's groups", but they gradually lost significance and disappeared by the early 1960s.

The inminban initially played a modest role in administration and surveillance, but the scope of its role began to expand in the mid-1960s. The power of the inminban was at its height from then until the mid-1990s.

Every North Korean woman who does not have a full-time job is required to participate in inminban activities, which include cleaning public toilets, tidying up the neighbourhood, manufacturing small items at home, and occasionally going to the countryside to do agricultural work. This made women without jobs nearly as busy as those with jobs, and was said to contribute to high female participation in the North Korea workforce. In the late 1960s employed North Korean women received a 700-gram (25 oz) ration of rice daily, where women who participated in inminban instead of having a job received just 300 grams (11 oz). Since the 1990s, the effectiveness of the inminban network has weakened. Some scholars say that the North Korean economic crisis and subsequent famine of the 1990s had left North Korea unable to compensate functionaries such as inminbanjang, reducing their incentive to help the state maintain social control. Inminbanjang are still said to be an important support to the North Korean security apparatus, but perhaps less motivated and diligent than they used to be.

== Structure ==
A typical inminban consists of 25 to 50 families and is defined by residential proximity. In a neighborhood consisting of one-story buildings, an inminban will usually include all families living in one or two blocks. The residents of a single apartment block will typically belong to the same inminban but larger buildings can be broken up into numerous groups. For example, an inminban might consist of all families sharing a common staircase in a large apartment building. Each inminban is headed by an official, almost always a woman and typically middle-aged, known as an inminbanjang (people's unit head), who is supposedly elected by the members of her inminban but in reality is appointed by the state. She will ordinarily receive a small stipend from the state for her work, as well as additional food rations.

The inminban system is not formally part of the North Korean security apparatus, but supports it. All inminban members are responsible for monitoring each other for criminal activity or political disobedience. The inminbanjang is expected to conduct surprise visits to all households under her jurisdiction at night. She also meets regularly with party authorities and reports misbehavior to them. The local district office people's committee (인민위원회) oversees her work and passes down to her directives from the Workers' Party of Korea.

In addition to surveillance, the inminban engages in organizing its members to do unpaid labor in maintaining the neighborhood. Every morning members of the inminban are sent to sweep the streets, remove garbage, deal with sewage, and generally keep things in order. In North Korea the occupations of janitor or street cleaner are virtually unheard of as the neighborhoods are overwhelmingly maintained by locals organized and managed by their inminban. Another role of the inminban is to manage the collection of human feces to be used as night soil for agriculture.

Inminbanjangs are also responsible for mobilizing housewives to work in the fields of nearby cooperative farms or do auxiliary work on construction sites. Labor mobilizations are typical in North Korea, and obligatory unpaid labor is typically arranged through the person's official employer. As a result the inminban is responsible for mobilizing housewives who do not have an employer.

In practice, the inminban system has withered since the 1990s. Due to the fact that inminbanjang are no longer rewarded for hard work and excessive efforts have the potential to cause them trouble with their neighbors, many do not carry out their duties with the same zeal as before. Many inminbanjang look the other way at transgressions and warn residents of upcoming night checks. Much of the inminban system has been monetized, with richer households paying poorer substitutes to undertake duties such as street cleaning, garbage collection, and labor mobilization in their place.

== See also ==
- Mass surveillance in North Korea
- Committees for the Defense of the Revolution (Cuba)
- Committees for the Defense of the Revolution (Burkina Faso)
- Blockleiter (Nazi Germany)
- Unofficial collaborator (East Germany)
- Voluntary People's Druzhina (Soviet Union)
- Tonarigumi (WWII-era Japan)
- Work unit
