= Danwei =

State institution of employment and political organization in China

A danwei (simplified Chinese: 单位; traditional Chinese: 單位; pinyin: dānwèi; lit. 'unit') or gongzuo danwei (simplified Chinese: 工作单位; traditional Chinese: 工作單位; pinyin: gōngzuò dānwèi; lit. 'work unit') is the name given to a place of employment in the People's Republic of China. The term danwei remains in use today, as people still use it to refer to their workplace. Prior to Deng Xiaoping's reform and opening up, a work unit acted as the first step of a multi-tiered hierarchy linking each individual with the Chinese Communist Party infrastructure. Work units were the principal method of implementing party policy. The work unit provided lifetime employment and extensive socioeconomic welfare—"a significant feature of socialism and a historic right won through the Chinese Revolution."

== Background ==
The role of the danwei was modelled in part on the Soviet kombinat. Some scholars believe that the social, economic, and political functions of the danwei could be traced back to the pre-communist financial institutions in the 1930s, the labor movement between the 1920s and 1940s, and the rural revolutionary models of organization in the Yan'an period. In addition, some scholars propose that Chinese state planners borrowed heavily from the Soviet model of development, or state socialism, in the design of party and state organs as well as the management of state enterprises. To accelerate the pace of industrialization and to create a new urban working class, the Chinese Communist Party (CCP) looked up to the Soviet experience and translated thousands of works of Soviet enterprise management literature. The CCP used basic principles of industrial organization and management from Soviet literature to draft its own industrial management system and create a new factory hierarchy of authority and administration. To follow the Soviet socialist economic model, which aimed to achieve full employment, the Chinese work unit system guaranteed permanent employment. This means that a factory could not easily fire its workers and the workers could not switch to another work unit unless they obtained special permissions.

== Description ==
Institutions such as industrial factories, schools and hospitals, and government departments are all part of the danwei system. Among them, the heavy industrial work units, commonly viewed as the prototype of the socialist workplace, were granted priority for resources. During the Maoist era, the work unit served as multifunctional urban institutions that encompassed various aspects of urban livelihoods. Danwei contained facilities for work and daily living, including production facilities, offices, residential areas, social services, child-care facilities, dry goods stores, public toilets, bath houses, meeting rooms, clubs for retirees, and sports courts and fields. Larger danwei might have schools or in-patient healthcare clinics. Workers' benefits were only partly in the form of wages, with significant benefits coming in the form of state-provided services and the like. Therefore, work units provided essential social resources to its members when the market economy had not yet fully developed. The industrial danwei was a state institution.

Among the goals that state planners sought to advance through constructing danwei as part of China's urbanization was the development of a socialist citizenry with a proletarian consciousness. In the danwei, urban Chinese lived and worked together in a collective and egalitarian environment.

== Under Mao ==
=== Political beginnings ===
The late nineteenth century saw a surge of "public social consciousness" which brought the public's attention to many social, political, moral, and sanitary dangers of urbanized areas. So when the CCP defeated the Kuomintang in 1949, they sought to consolidate urban rule quickly for their own interests and that of the general populations'. By 1957, over 90 percent of the urban population belonged to a danwei.

The danwei became as much of a social and political tool as it was an economic one. The CCP's creation of a danwei system that was based strictly on functionalism represented a break from the previous imperial China's focus on Confucian principles of hierarchy and order. Thus, Danweis were themselves a product of socialist ideology but furthermore, they were "key sites" for the CCP-led government to promote their egalitarian ideology. As a result of danweis being such a socially enclosed and monitored environment, people became hyperaware of their behaviour and strived for absolute conformity which gave way for the "penetration of the Leninist state in urban society."

Danweis became successful vessels for political mobilization as the encouraged relations between employees were founded upon and channelled into political participation, often against an enemy. An example of this would be the massive workers' strikes during Mao Zedong's Hundred Flowers Campaign where in the span of 6 months between 1956 and 1957, over 10,000 strikes had occurred nationwide in favour of Chairman Mao's attack on bureaucratism.

=== As a failed means of economic recovery ===
Between 1962 and 1965, during the Mao era, Beijing's leaders adopted emergency measures after the Great Leap Forward resulted in mass starvation and agricultural downturn. More than 20 million people who had settled in urban areas were forced back to the countryside to work when urban food and consumer goods were strictly rationed in the socially-controlled danweis.

=== Control of internal migration ===
The CCP then put into place policies that "had the effect of freezing people into their current work units." This often meant that many workers had little or no knowledge of what was going on outside of their unit and there was close to no mobility between units or residences. The danwei unit system in tandem with strict residence registration requirements, namely the Hukou system, prevented migration from rural areas to urban ones, essentially dividing China into two tiers: a privileged urban society and an exploited rural society.

=== Cultural Revolution ===
During the Cultural Revolution from 1966 to 1976, both administrative agencies and production regulation in relation to danweis were extremely disrupted.

== Post-Mao ==
=== Decline ===
In the years during the reform and opening up beginning in 1976 and ending in 1989, led by Deng Xiaoping, the policies surrounding the permanency of the employee to the work unit became more lax, particularly in enterprise units (qiye danwei) where there was an increasing lack of a personnel dossier (dang an) system that prevented people from transferring or quitting.

The danwei system only further weakened after 1978 when a market economy was put in place in lieu of a planned economy, and as the space became more heterogenous, it lost its once collective spirit and became more unstable. It was in 1978 that Chinese leadership suggested private housing and in 1980, the National Urban Housing and Residence Meeting granted workers permission to build and own property, as well as buy public housing units. In 1988, the State Council stopped issuing the construction of new housing units and instead redirected those funds to support workers buying their own housing units.

Ultimately, the danwei lost its economic and social dominance in the lives of Chinese urban workers due to economic reform and changing social attitudes towards individuality and identity amidst sweeping political change. By the 1990s, urban social identity shifted as people began to identify themselves by their individual identity cards rather than their danwei.

=== Disintegration ===
One of the most significant consequences of the danwei system's decline was the large scale layoffs of state-owned enterprise workers in the late 1990s, known as xiagang (下岗), which marked the end of guaranteed lifetime employment and the welfare provisions traditionally provided by work units. Official media used the phrase xiagang (meaning "laid off") or daiye ("waiting to be employed"), deeming shiye ("unemployed") too politically sensitive. The personnel files of laid off workers continued to be under the auspices of their former employer, meaning that they continued to be members of the danwei. Some danwei continued to provide benefits like health care checks to laid off workers and some laid off workers negotiated housing or compensation from the danwei; whether these arrangements were available depended on numerous factors, especially the solvency of the danwei.

By 2000, much of the work unit's remaining power had been removed.

== See also ==
- Dangan
- Hukou system
- People's commune
- Production brigade
- Production team (China)
- Shequ, structural replacement for Danwei
- Inminban

== Bibliography ==
- Bjorklund, E. M. “The Danwei: Socio-Spatial Characteristics of Work Units in China's Urban Society.” Economic Geography, vol. 62, no. 1, 1986, pp. 19–29.
- Chai, Yanwei (2014-09-24). "From socialist danwei to new danwei: a daily-life-based framework for sustainable development in urban China". Asian Geographer.
- "Danwei -Work Unit Urbanism | Model House". transculturalmodernism.org. Retrieved 2019-11-30.
- Danwei : the changing Chinese workplace in historical and comparative perspective. Lü, Xiaobo, 1959-, Perry, Elizabeth J. Armonk, N.Y.: M.E. Sharpe. 1997
- Lin, Kevin. "Work Unit.” Afterlives of Chinese Communism: Political Concepts from Mao to Xi, edited by Christian Sorace et al., ANU Press, Australia, 2019, pp. 331–334.
- Kaple, Deborah A. (1994-01-06). Dream of a Red Factory: The Legacy of High Stalinism in China. Oxford University Press.
- Walder, Andrew G. Communist Neo-Traditionalism: Work and Authority in Chinese Industry. University of California Press, 1986.
- Whyte, Martin King and William L. Parish. Urban Life in Contemporary China. University of Chicago Press. 1984.
- 刘建军。《单位中国 : 社会调控体系重构中的个人, 组织与国家》。天津：天津人民出版社, 2000.
