= Ten Principles for the Establishment of a Monolithic Ideological System =

De facto supreme law of North Korea

- Hangul: 당의 유일사상체계확립의 10 대 원칙
- Hanja: 黨의 唯一思想體系確立의 10 大原則
- RR: dangui yuilsasangchegyehwangnibui 10 dae wonchik
- MR: tangŭi yuilsasangch'egyehwangnibŭi 10 tae wŏnch'ik

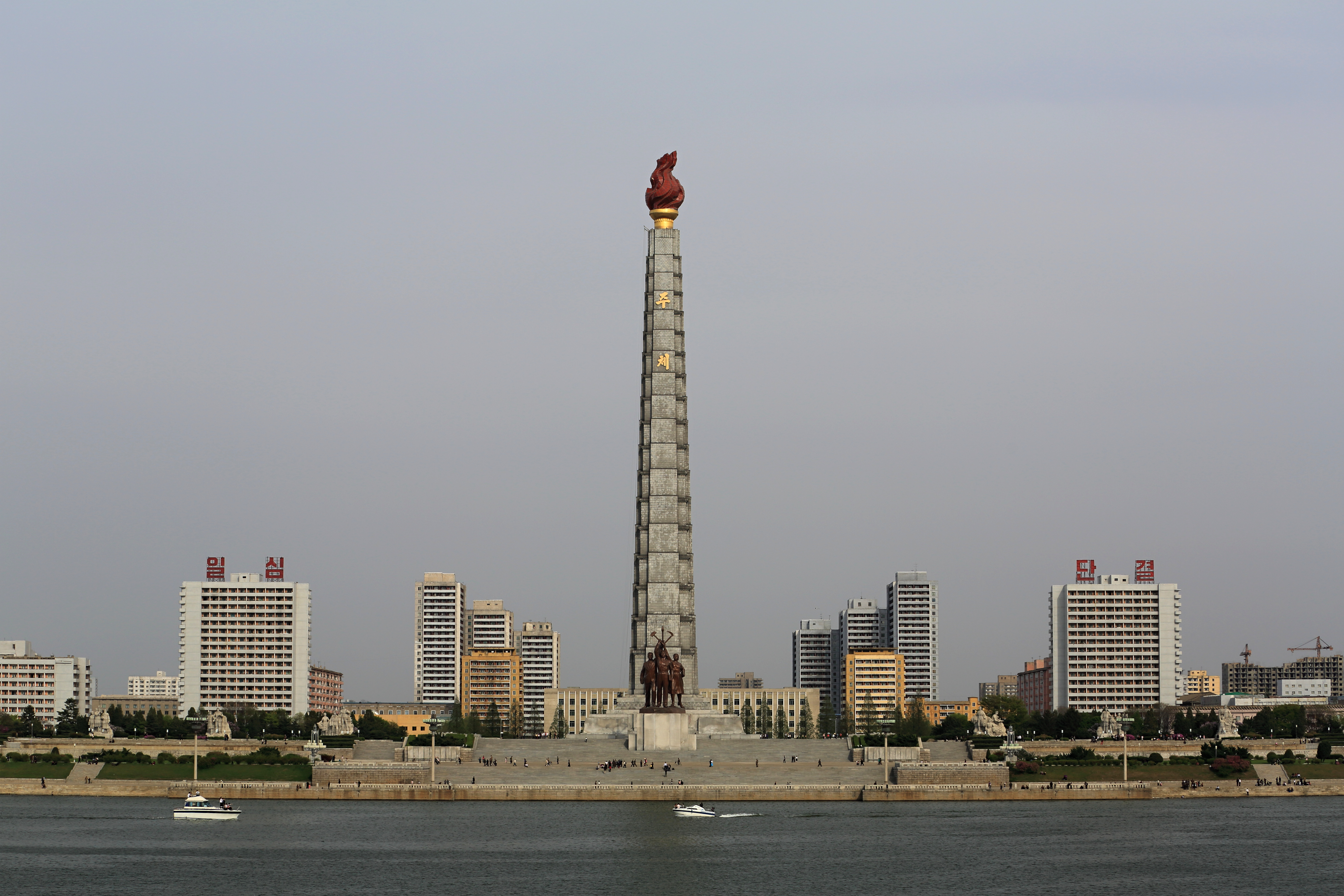
Signs atop two buildings adjacent to the Juche Tower read "single-hearted unity" (일심 단결)

Ten Principles for the Establishment of a Monolithic Ideological System (Korean: 당의 유일사상체계확립의 10 대 원칙; RR: Dangui yuilsasangchegyehwangnibui 10 dae wonchik; MR: Tangŭi yuilsasangch'egyehwangnibŭi 10 tae wŏnch'ik; also known as the Ten Principles of the One-Ideology System) are a set of ten principles and sixty-five clauses establishing standards for governance and guiding the behaviors of the people of North Korea. First published in 1974, the Ten Principles mandate absolute loyalty and obedience to the ideas of Kim Il Sung, and later his successor Kim Jong Il, establishing them as the country's supreme political authorities.

== Development ==
The Principles were originally proposed in 1967 by Kim Yong-ju, the younger brother of North Korean leader Kim Il Sung, following the Kapsan faction incident that had unsuccessfully sought to challenge Kim Il Sung's authority and Kim Yong-ju's position as the heir apparent of that time. As such, the Monolithic Ideological System emerged in the context of internal policy debates within the Workers' Party of Korea and the external challenges posed by the Sino-Soviet split and Chinese Cultural Revolution. Kim Il Sung announced the System to the public in a speech held at the Supreme People's Assembly on 16 December 1967, entitled "Let Us Embody the Revolutionary Spirit of Independence, Self-Sustenance, and Self-Defense More Thoroughly in All Branches of State Activity" (Korean: 국가활동의 모든 부문에서 자주, 자립, 자위의 혁명정신을 더욱 철저히 구현하자; RR: Gukgahwaldongui modeun bumuneseo jaju, jarip, jawiui hyeongmyeongjeongsineul deoung cheoljeohi guhyeonhaja; MR: Kukkahwaltongŭi modŭn pumunesŏ chaju, charip, chawiŭi hyŏngmyŏngjŏngshinŭl tŏung ch'ŏlchŏhi kuhyŏnhaja).

The Principles were rewritten for publication by Kim Jong Il, with the help of Hwang Jang-yop, after Kim became Kim Il Sung's apparent successor in February 1974. The updated Principles were longer and further extended the personality cult surrounding Kim. The Principles attained an official status in the party in 1974. The Principles were amended for the first time in August 2013, and several new concepts such as Kimilsungism–Kimjongilism, the Songun Revolution, and nuclear statehood have been enshrined therein.

== Implementation ==
The Ten Principles have come to supersede the Constitution of North Korea and edicts by the Workers' Party of Korea, and in practice, serve as the supreme law of the country.

In North Korea, the Ten Principles must be memorized by every citizen, and they ensure absolute loyalty and obedience to Kim Il Sung, Kim Jong Il, and Kim Jong Un. An anonymous source told Radio Free Asia that the Principles are integral to the political and daily lives of the people and are to be exercised through daily self-criticism sessions, in their work, school, etc., forming the foundation of the North Korean cult of personality.

According to North Korean dictionaries, the Ten Principles are defined as follows: "The ideological system by which the whole party and people is firmly armed with the revolutionary ideology of the Suryong (Great Leader) and united solidly around him, carrying out the revolutionary battle and construction battle under the sole leadership of the Suryong."

== Text ==
=== 1974 version ===
The following version of the Principles was adopted by the party central committee in 1967 and announced in 1974.

1. We must give our all in the struggle to unify the entire society with the revolutionary ideology of the Great Leader Kim Il Sung.
2. We must honor the Great Leader comrade Kim Il Sung with all our loyalty.
3. We must make absolute the authority of the Great Leader comrade Kim Il Sung.
4. We must make the Great Leader comrade Kim Il Sung's revolutionary ideology our faith and make his instructions our creed.
5. We must adhere strictly to the principle of unconditional obedience in carrying out the Great Leader comrade Kim Il Sung's instructions.
6. We must strengthen the entire party's ideology and willpower and revolutionary unity, centering on the Great Leader comrade Kim Il Sung.
7. We must learn from the Great Leader comrade Kim Il Sung and adopt the communist look, revolutionary work methods and people-oriented work style.
8. We must value the political life we were given by the Great Leader comrade Kim Il Sung, and loyally repay his great political trust and thoughtfulness with heightened political awareness and skill.
9. We must establish strong organizational regulations so that the entire party, nation and military move as one under the one and only leadership of the Great Leader comrade Kim Il Sung.
10. We must pass down the great achievement of the revolution by the Great Leader comrade Kim Il Sung from generation to generation, inheriting and completing it to the end.

=== Detailed version ===
The Citizen's Alliance for North Korean Human Rights (북한인권시민연합; Bughan-Ingwonsimin-Yeonhab) provides a more detailed version of the Principles.

1. Every citizen must struggle through life to paint the entire society the single color of the Great Leader Comrade KIM Il Sung's revolutionary thought. It is considered the highest doctrine of the Workers' Party to paint the entire society the single color of the Great Leader's revolutionary thought, and a higher level of task is to construct the party's unitary ideology system.
2. All are to respect and give high reverence with loyalty and fidelity to Great Leader Comrade KIM Il Sung. Highly revering him who is the Great Leader of Korea is the noblest duty of the revolutionary warriors who are endlessly loyal to him. Within this lies the glory of the nation and the eternal happiness of the people.
3. It is the wish of the Party that one must make absolute the authority of the Great Leader Comrade KIM Il Sung over the nation. Affirming the absolute nature of his authority is the supreme demand of the revolutionary tasks and the revolutionary volition of the Korean people and the WPK.
4. Everyone must accept the Great Leader Comrade KIM Il Sung's revolutionary thought as a personal belief and take the Great Leader's instructions as a creed. Accepting the Great Leader Comrade KIM Il Sung's thought as one's own belief and taking his instructions as one's creed is the most crucial element requested for one to become an endlessly loyal Juche communist warrior. It is also a precondition for the victory of the revolutionary struggle and its construction.
5. One must observe absolutely the principle of unconditional execution in carrying out the instructions of the Great Leader Comrade KIM Il Sung. Unconditionally executing his instructions in daily life is the basic requisite for proving loyalty towards the Great Leader, and the ultimate condition for the victory of the party's revolutionary struggle and its establishment.
6. The nation must rally behind the unity of ideological intellect and revolutionary solidarity around the Great Leader Comrade KIM Il Sung. The steel-like unity of the party is the source of the party's invincible power, and a firm assurance of the victory of the revolution.
7. Education from the Great Leader Comrade KIM Il Sung and mastering communist dignity, the methods of achieving revolutionary tasks, and the people's work styles, is needed. Learning the Great Leader's communist dignity, the methods of achieving revolutionary tasks, and the people's work styles are the divine duties of all members of the party and of all workers of all industries and sectors, and the prerequisite for fulfilling the honorary fate of every revolutionary warrior.
8. The political life the Great Leader Comrade KIM Il Sung has bestowed upon each citizen must be dearly defended and preserved till the end, and one must repay loyally with high political awareness and skill for the Great Leader's boundless political trust and considerations. It is for every Korean the highest honor to have bestowed upon the political life by the Great Leader Comrade KIM Il Sung and repaying his trust loyally can lead to a bright future for political life.
9. A strong organizational discipline so that the entire Party, the entire people, and the People's Army will operate uniformly under the sole leadership of the Great Leader Comrade KIM Il Sung must be established. This is the essential requirement to strengthen the party's collective ideology, leadership, and its combat power. It is also a firm assurance for the victory of the revolutionary struggle and its establishment.
10. The great revolutionary accomplishments pioneered by the Great Leader Comrade KIM Il Sung must be succeeded and perfected by hereditary succession until the end of time. The firm establishment of the sole leadership system is the crucial assurance for the preservation and development of the Great Leader's revolutionary accomplishments, while achieving the final victory of the revolution in Korea and helping in preparing for its final victory in the world.

=== 2013 version ===
After Kim Jong Il's death in 2011, the Principles were updated to include his name alongside Kim Il Sung's with a new name: "Ten Principles for the Establishment of the Party's Single Leadership System (당의 유일적령도체계확립의 10대 원칙; Dang-ui Yuiljeongryeongdochegyehwangribui 10-dae Wonchik)".

1. We must give our all in the struggle to unify the entire society with Kimilsungism and Kimjongilism.
2. We must honor the great Comrades Kim Il Sung and Kim Jong Il as the eternal leaders of our Party and the people and as the Sun of Juche.
3. We must make absolute and desperately defend the authority of the great Comrades Kim Il Sung and Kim Jong Il and the authority of the Workers' Party.
4. We must be thoroughly armed with the revolutionary ideas of the great Comrades Kim Il Sung and Kim Jong Il and the Party's lines and policies that are the realization of these ideas.
5. We must adhere strictly to the principle of unconditional obedience in accomplishing the instructions passed on by the great Comrades Kim Il Sung and Kim Jong Il and in the lines and policies of the Party.
6. We must strengthen by all possible means the entire Party's ideology, willpower, and revolutionary unity, centering on the Leader.
7. We must learn from the great Comrades Kim Il Sung and Kim Jong Il and adopt the noble mental and moral presence, revolutionary work methods, and people-oriented work style.
8. We must value the political life we were given by the Party and the Leader and loyally repay the Party's trust and thoughtfulness with heightened political awareness and work performance.
9. We must establish strong organizational regulations so that the entire Party, nation, and People's the Army move as one under the one and only leadership of the Workers' Party.
10. We must pass down the great achievement of the Juche and the Songun revolutions in Korea, pioneered by the great Comrade Kim Il Sung and led by Comrades Kim Il Sung and Kim Jong Il, from generation to generation, inheriting and completing this work until the very end and its ultimate triumph.

== See also ==
- Kimilsungism–Kimjongilism
- Juche
- Songun
