= Day of Songun =

Public holiday in North Korea (25 August)

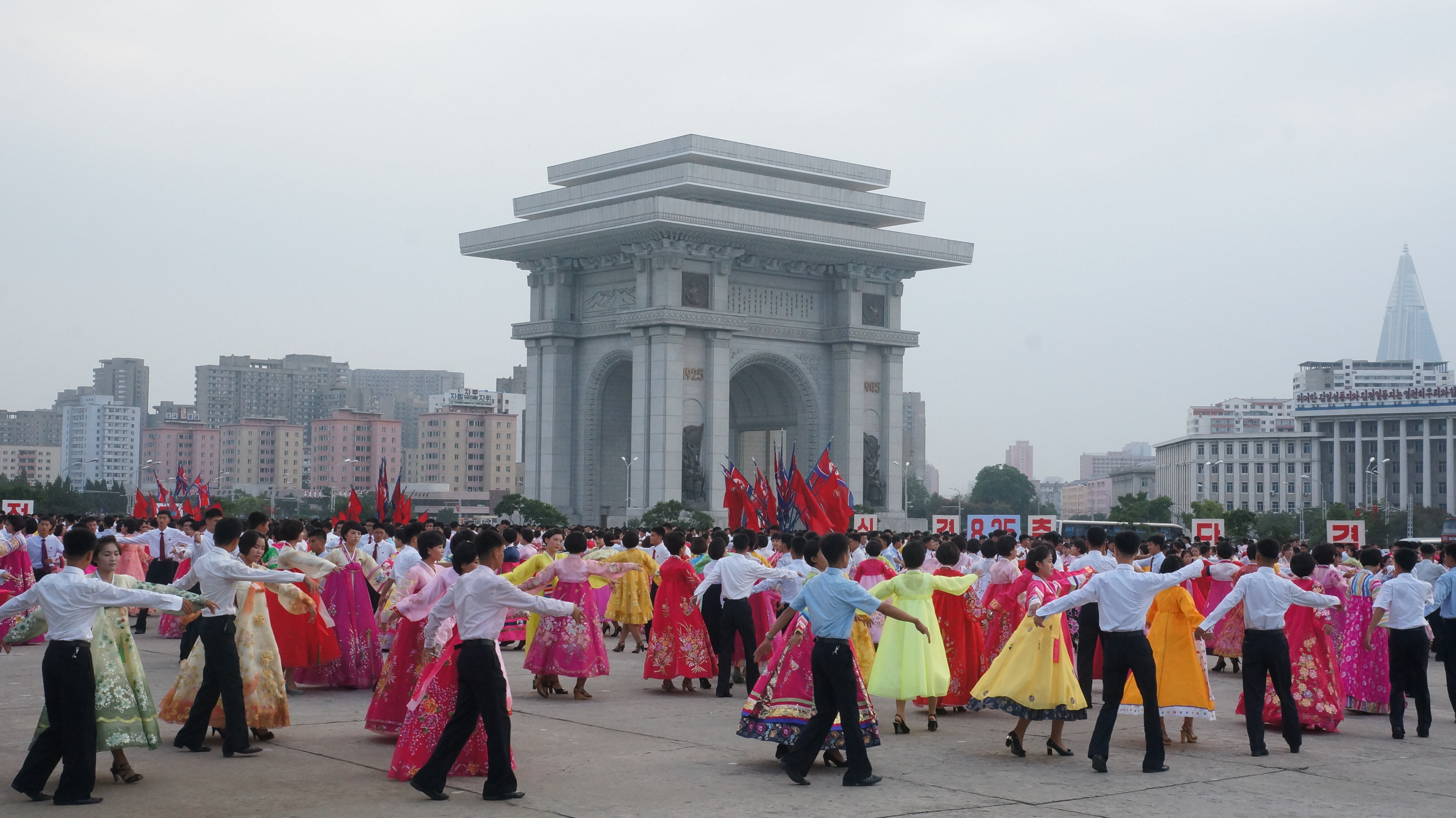
- Day of Songun celebrations by the Arch of Triumph in Pyongyang
- Observed by: North Korea
- Significance: Beginning of the Songun leadership of Kim Jong Il (1960)
- Observances: Flying the flags of North Korea and the Supreme Commander of the KPA, galas, dancing parties, concerts, laying bouquets, and visiting historic sites
- Date: 25 August
- Next time: 25 August 2026
- Frequency: Annual
- First time: 2013

Korean name
- Hangul: 선군절
- Hanja: 先軍節
- RR: Seongunjeol
- MR: Sŏn'gunjŏl

The Day of Songun (Korean: 선군절) is a public holiday in North Korea celebrated on 25 August annually to commemorate the beginning of Kim Jong Il's Songun (military-first) leadership in 1960.

In 2013, Kim Jong Un elevated the holiday to an official status on the North Korean calendar, on par with the Day of the Sun (birth anniversary of Kim Il Sung). Thus it became the holiday associated with Kim Jong Un, with his own birthday still missing from the official calendar. This has helped to further Kim Jong Un's charismatic rule. According to North Korea analyst Adam Cathcart, the purpose of the holiday is "to reinforce Kim Jong Un's legitimacy to rule, confirm the principle of very early succession and young leadership, and emphasize the preternatural military abilities of the sons in the Kim family."

On the calendar, the 25 August holiday takes place after the Liberation Day (15 August) and before the Day of the Foundation of the Republic (9 September). Day of Songun is one of three days celebrating Kim Jong Il on the calendar, the other two being the Day of the Shining Star (his birth anniversary) and Generalissimo Day (commemorating his accession to the rank of Taewonsu).

== Background ==
Songun (military-first) is the political ideology peculiar to North Korea that all problems in society can be corrected by giving priority to military affairs. Its roots are traced to Kim Il Sung's activities during the anti-Japanese struggle of the 1930s, but it is especially identified with Kim Jong Il. Lately, Songun has been associated with Kim Jong Un in his effort balance the interests of the ruling Workers' Party of Korea and the Korean People's Army (KPA). According to Fyodor Tertitskiy, the term has largely lost its original meaning and now simply means anything "good". Consequentially, Day of Songun is not so much about the army as it is about the person of Kim Jong Il.

Until 2005, the history of Kim Jong Il's Songun leadership was presented as having begun on 1 January 1995 with his visit to a guard-post. After 2005, the date was backtracked to 1960 to suggest a much longer held tradition. The Day of Songun commemorates his supposed 25 August 1960 inspection of the Seoul Ryu Kyong Su Guards 105th Tank Division with his father Kim Il Sung then located at the Ssangun Revolutionary Site. The visit is considered the beginning of his Songun leadership. Although Jong-il would have been 18 then and not yet started his studies at Kim Il Sung University, according to, Tertitskiy, "[t]he date looks right, as it seemingly the date when Kim Jong Il made his first steps up the political ladder".

== History ==
Military units fly the Standard of the Supreme Commander of the KPA on the day.

The commemoration was not a major celebration under Kim Jong Il's rule, but there had been annual celebrations even before the holiday was officially instituted. Plans for an official holiday surfaced in 2012, and the Korean Central News Agency (KCNA) reported some celebration of a "Day of Songun" already back then. Kim Jong Un delivered a speech during the 2012 festivities, entitled "Only Victory and Glory Will Be in Store for Us Who are Advancing under the Unfurled Flag Bearing the Immortal Beaming Images of the Great Kim Il Sung and Kim Jong Il".

The next year, on 25 August 2013, Kim Jong Un officially announced the holiday in a long speech, entitled "Let Us Forever Glorify Comrade Kim Jong Il's Great Idea and Achievements of the Military-First Revolution", published in Rodong Sinmun and Joson Inmingun. In it, Kim Jong Un declared:

The Day of Songun, when General Kim Jong Il started his leadership of the Songun revolution, is, together with the day of the founding of the KPA (Korean People's Army), a historic day when an important milestone was set up for the history of building up our revolutionary armed forces and the history of our country. As there was this significant day, a historic turn could be brought about in developing our revolutionary armed forces and implementing the cause of the Juche revolution, and the history and traditions of our sacred Songun revolution that had been pioneered and developed by force of arms, achieving victory, could be carried forward continuously.

The next day, 26 August, a decree on instituting the Day of Songun as an annual national holiday was adopted by the Supreme People's Assembly.

== Celebrations ==
The Day of Songun is marked with flying the flag of North Korea, by civilians, and the flag of the Supreme Commander of the KPA by military units. Observances include galas for service people, dancing parties around the country, outdoor concerts, laying bouquets, and visiting historic sites.

== See also ==
- Public holidays in North Korea
- Songun
