= Day of the Foundation of the Republic =

Annual observance in North Korea

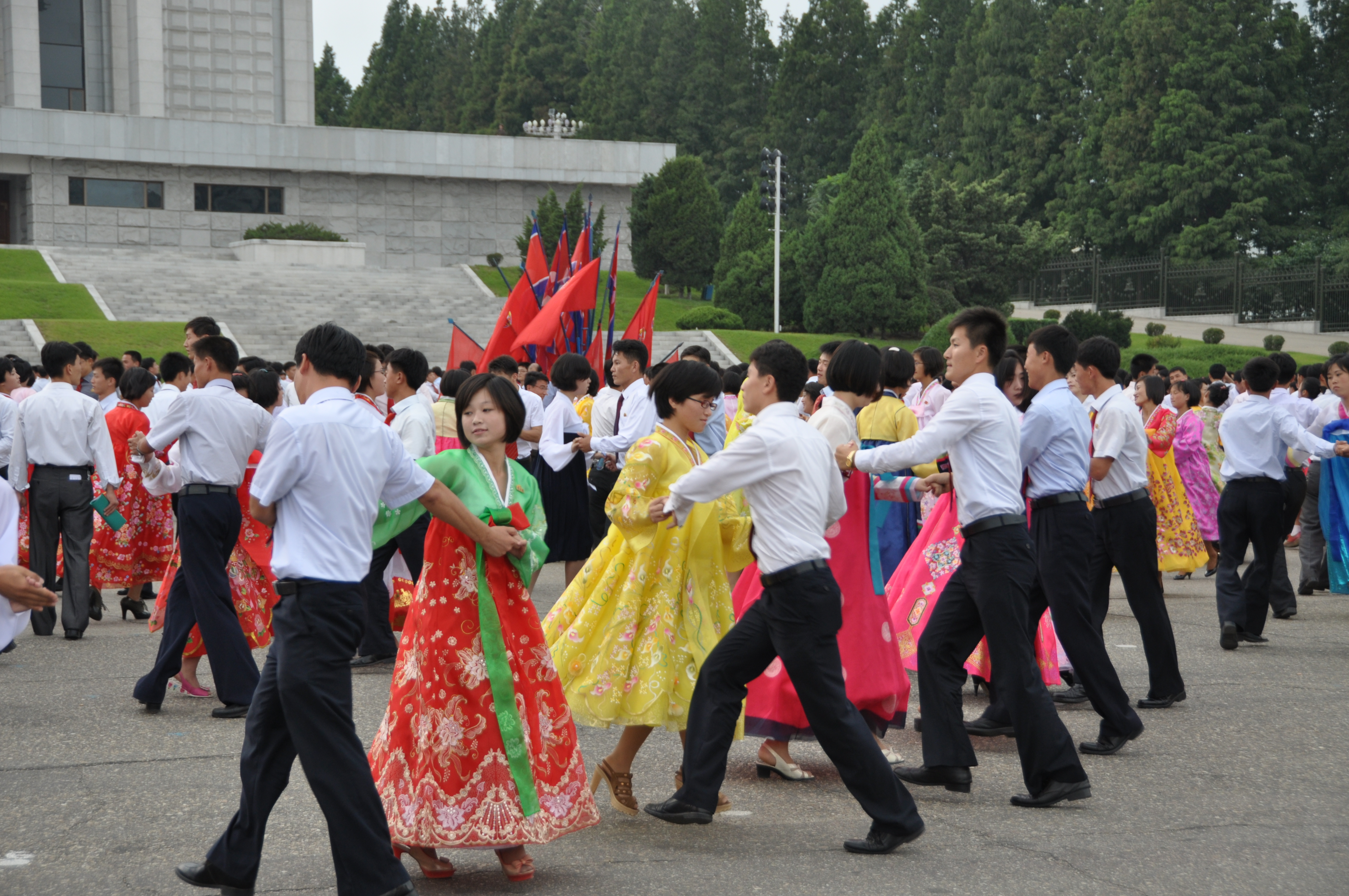
- Also called: Independence Day
- Observed by: North Korea
- Observances: Visits to statues of Kim Il Sung and his mausoleum, fireworks, performances, sports competitions, folk dances
- Date: 9 September
- Next time: 9 September 2027
- Frequency: annual
- Related to: Day of the Shining Star (16 February), Day of the Sun (15 April), Party Foundation Day (10 October), Constitution Day (27 December)

Day of the Foundation of the Republic (Korean: 인민정권 창건일; Hanja: 人民政權 創建日) is the Republic Day and National day of the Democratic People's Republic of Korea, held on 9 September.

The Day of the Foundation of the Republic is one of the most important holidays of the country, along with the Day of the Sun (birthday of Kim Il Sung), Day of the Shining Star (birthday of Kim Jong Il) and Party Foundation Day.

== History ==
Following the liberation of Korea in 1945 by the Soviet and American forces, a communist Soviet military regime was set up in the northern part of Korea. On 10 July 1948, the People's Assembly of North Korea formally enacted the constitution in the Korean territory north of the 38th parallel, effectively establishing the Democratic People's Republic of Korea. A new Supreme People's Assembly was elected in August 1948, and the SPA decided to extend the constitution to incorporate the entire peninsula on 8 September. On 9 September, the Soviet authorities appointed Kim Il Sung as its first Premier and formally recognized the DPRK; this date has been celebrated annually as its "foundation day". Because the date is 9 September, it is also called 9 · 9 Holiday (구구절).

== National celebrations ==
The holiday is celebrated throughout the country. It is one of the most important holidays of the country, along with the Day of the Sun (birthday of Kim Il Sung), Day of the Shining Star (birthday of Kim Jong Il) and Party Foundation Day. On this day, events such as art performances, exhibitions, athletic events, and reports are held. On jubilee years (ex: 25th anniversary, 40th anniversary, 50th anniversary, 60th anniversary, 70th anniversary), military parades on Kim Il Sung Square take place with the participation of the leader of North Korea. It is also common for new children to be admitted to the Korean Children's Union on the day.

In contrast to many other holidays that are very politicized, the Foundation Day concerns the whole country. It also has an international and diplomatic outlook with foreigners being likelier to attend it than some other holidays. The day was first celebrated in 1949. The intensity of celebrations has varied considerably. Celebrations in 1950 were low key due to the Korean War. In contrast, 1956 saw sizeable celebrations following Kim Il Sung's triumph in a domestic political crisis just days earlier called the August Faction Incident. In 1997 the Juche calendar was adopted on September 9, which became September 9, Juche 86.

In 1978, the country celebrated the 30th anniversary of the republic. In honor of the anniversary, Chinese paramount leader Deng Xiaoping attended in his official capacities as the First Vice Premier of the State Council and the Chairman of the Chinese People's Political Consultative Conference.

In 2018:

- North Korea marked the 70th anniversary of its foundation, during which Russian Federation Council Chairman Valentina Matviyenko and Mauritanian President Mohamed Ould Abdel Aziz, as well as delegations from Cuba, Syria, Lebanon, Palestine, the Dominican Republic, Uganda, and South Africa were in attendance during the celebrations.
- Chinese Communist Party general secretary Xi Jinping was expected to attend the parade during his state visit to North Korea on 9 September, however cancelled his attendance, instead sending Congress chairman Li Zhanshu to Pyongyang.
- For the first time in five years, the Arirang Mass Games also took place.

In 2021, a banquet was held at the yard in front of the Central Committee building at the Government Complex No. 1 in central Pyongyang. In the 2022 celebrations, a concert and an outdoor banquet was held in the yard of the Mansudae Assembly Hall. In 2026 Kim Jong-un delivered a congratulatory speech at a national flag-raising ceremony and central oath-taking meeting that took place at the Pyongyang Assembly Hall.

=== National civil-military parade ===
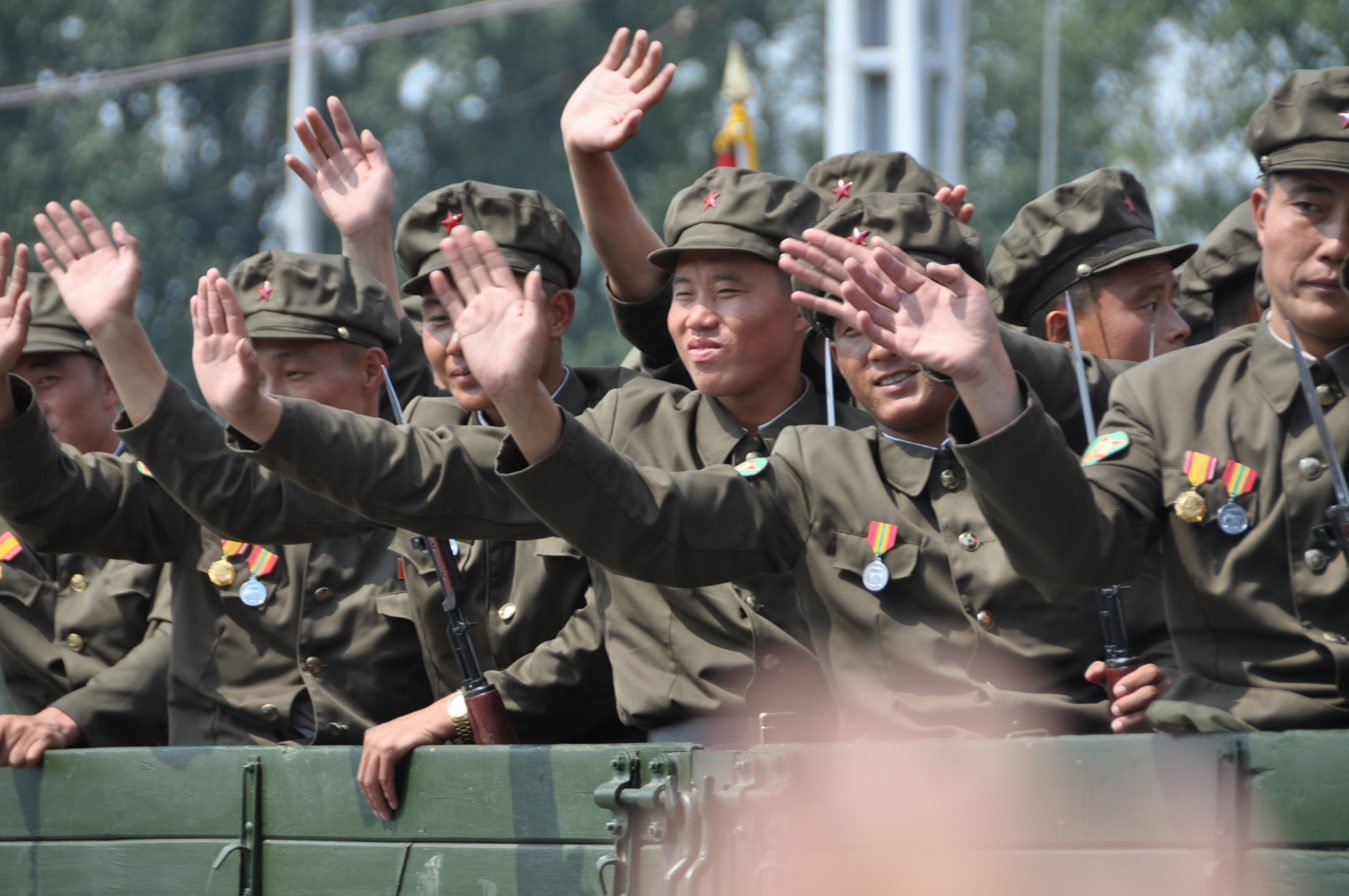
Worker-Peasant Red Guards in Pyongyang during the 2013 Day of the Foundation of the Republic.

The semiannual parade, which was a feature of the day since the first parade of 1948, and is also televised on Korean Central Television via tape delay (since 2018), is a key highlight of the national celebrations in Pyongyang. Since 1958, parades have been held on the city's Kim Il Sung Square in honor of the holiday every 5 years, following Chinese practice. The first parade was a purely civil one (and so did others like the parades of 1960, 1968 and 1988) and it was in 1993 that the parade became a civil-military event.

The parade is attended by the Supreme Leader of the DPRK in his capacity as the Supreme Commander of the Armed Forces of North Korea, and the current format dates from the parade of 2013. Its commander is a general-ranked officer of the KPA with the rank of either Colonel General or General of the Army (rarely a vice marshal) with the billet of Commanding Officer, Pyongyang Defense Command, with the parade inspector also is a general-ranked officer of the KPA with the rank of either Colonel General or General of the Army (rarely a vice marshal or even a Marshal of the Republic) with higher billets, usually the Chief of the General Staff or Minister of Defense.

==== Rehearsals ====
The Korean People's Army prepares for these parades at Mirim Parade Training Ground in the summer and is expected to be one of the largest according to a satellite analysis of the capital. The training ground includes a replica of Kim Il-Sung Square and the central grandstand that is used during rehearsals.

==== Arrival honors ====
Before 10 a.m., the parade is formed up as a trumpeter sounds the attention call. To the tune of the massed bands of the Korean People's Army and the Korean People's Social Security Forces, the parade's formations march into Kim Il Sung Square by battalions, each echelon halting and then taking their places in the square. Since 2013 the guard of honor battalion of the Supreme Guard Command, a joint service formation, takes its places in the formation as well together with the massed bands. (A third honor guard company is stationed in front of the Grand People's Study House to receive the arrival of the Supreme Leader and other party and state leaders.)

At the stands at the square are distinguished citizens, residents of Pyongyang, veterans of the People's Army and members of the diplomatic corps.

At 10 a.m. the Supreme Leader arrives at the grandstand and is received by a field officer of the Army who serves as the commander of the honor guard company, informing him of the readiness of the guard for inspection. He is accompanied by the following:

- High ranking members of the Central Committee of the WPK, including Politburo
- Chairman of the Standing Committee of the Supreme People's Assembly
- Chairman of the Supreme People's Assembly
- Director of the General Political Bureau of the Korean People's Army
- Minister of State Security
- Minister of Social Security
- Premier of the Cabinet
- President and Chief Justice of Supreme Court
- Director General of the Supreme Public Prosecutor's Office
- Other dignitaries
- During jubilee years, the occasional foreign leader or high ranking official on state visit to the DPRK

As a secondary band plays inspection music, he inspects the guard company, and following this, he then enters the parade grandstand. At the signal of the conductor of the Massed Bands who then play "Song of Happiness for the Great Leader", a signature tune adopted in the late 1960s, the Supreme Commander arrives at the central viewing platform of the grandstand with the other invited dignitaries. Upon his arrival, the parade renders a salute and the colours of all participating units are dipped, as all 20,000 service personnel on formation shout Manse! loud while a 21-gun salute is fired.

==== Ceremonial segment ====
Female soldiers rehearsing for the parade in 2011.

As the music ends, the massed bands on formation sound an opening fanfare and then begin a military tattoo-style segment with the guards of honor as they prepare to reform to ceremonial order, in a tradition that began in 2013. Following this the parade commander takes his place on his vehicle, now set to begin the ceremonial segments of the parade. Following the command to present arms, the parade renders honors to the national flag and the banner of the Workers' Party, which arrive at the square on vehicles. As the colour guards depart, they march on to the two flagpoles at the south end of the square facing the state grandstand, whereby as the massed bands play "Aegukka" and '"Long Live the Workers' Party of Korea", the flags are raised.

Following this, the parade presents arms again for the inspection phrase. To the tune of the massed bands, the parade commander's vehicle meets with the vehicle of the parade inspector, and as the music stops the parade commander informs the parade inspector for the readiness of the parade to be reviewed for inspection. The report done, the parade inspection begins as each of the battalions forming up the parade are inspected while the bands play, and as they halt the inspector greets the formations assembled. Following this, after all have been inspected, the two then depart to inspect the mobile column, and after the inspector greets the personnel of the column formed into battalions, they both return, as the bands play "Victorious Military Parade", to the square. As the music pauses, the parade inspector then informs the Supreme Leader that the parade, now formed up and having been inspected, is now ready for the marchpast, the report received the inspector leaves for the grandstand while the parade commander returns to his position.

As the inspector arrives and the parade asked to order arms and stand at ease, the fanfare trumpeters sound a fanfare, and as another 21-gun salute is fired the massed bands play both the "Song of General Kim il-Sung" and the "Song of General Kim Jong-il", followed by the keynote national address by a high-ranking member of the Party Political Bureau or in some cases, the Supreme Leader himself. Following this, the parade renders a general salute to the memory of both Kim il-Sung and Kim Jong Il as limousines carrying their portraits are driven past, with red flag bearers (formerly colour bearers of KPA formations) escorting them while the massed bands play, the echelons are led by veteran officers of the KPA. (This segment was first introduced in the golden jubilee parade of 1998.) After this segment, the parade commander gives the following commands:

Parade... attention! Ceremonial march past!
Form battalions! Distance by a single lineman! First battalion will remain in the right, remainder... left.. turn!
Slope.. arms!
(Eyes to the right..) Forward, quick march!

As the command is given to start the linemen take their places and the senior director of music of the massed bands gets his conducting baton ready to conduct the bands. After the final command, as the bands strike up the mostly locally composed marches the parade's ground column marches out by battalions past the grandstand and into the streets of the capital. As of 2021 the Cavalry Honors Group of the Supreme Guards Command leads the parading contingents first, followed by a historical column in jubilee years wearing uniforms of the Second World War Korean resistance and the Korean War period. As each battalion marches past the grandstand, in a recent tradition that began in the 65th anniversary parade in 2013, the color ensign dips the unit colour and upon finishing its march past away from the dais the bearer returns the colour to the slope position. Units that carry battle rifles or RPGs would present them at the trail at the eyes right position - a practice inherited from long time use of the Mosin Nagant and SKS by KPA formations. The parade's order of precedence for contingents on the march past is the KPA first followed by the Ministry of Social Security, the State Security Department, KPA Reserve Military Training Units, the Worker Peasant Red Guards, Red Youth Guards and the Korean Children's Union. On special years the KPA contingent is preceded by a historical formation wearing uniforms showing the evolution of the KPA and the country at large.

== See also ==
- Day of the Shining Star
- Day of the Sun
- Government of North Korea
- History of North Korea
- National symbols of North Korea
- Public holidays in North Korea
