= Under the Sun (2015 film) =

2015 film directed by Vitaly Mansky

- Russian: В лучах Солнца
- Directed by: Vitaly Mansky
- Written by: Vitaly Mansky
- Produced by: Natalia Manskaya
- Cinematography: Alexandra Ivanova
- Edited by: Andrej Paperny
- Music by: Kārlis Auzāns
- Production companies: Vertov.Real Cinema; Saxonia Entertainment; Hypermarket Films; Mitteldeutscher Rundfunk; North Korean Ministry of Culture
- Distributed by: Deckert Distribution; Icarus Films
- Release date: 29 October 2015 (DOK Leipzig)
- Running time: 90 minutes 105 minutes 110 minutes
- Countries: Russia; Germany; Czech Republic; Latvia; North Korea
- Language: Korean (Northern dialect)

Under the Sun (Russian: В лучах солнца, romanized: V luchakh solntsa; Korean: 태양 아래, romanized: Taeyang Alae) is a 2015 documentary film directed by Vitaly Mansky. It depicts a year in the life of a family in Pyongyang, North Korea, as their daughter, Zin-mi, prepares to join the Korean Children's Union on the Day of the Shining Star (Kim Jong Il's birthday).

North Korea permitted only Mansky, cinematographer Alexandra Ivanova, and a sound assistant to visit the country. After discovering that the crew had smuggled unapproved footage out of the country and included it in the finished film, North Korean authorities objected to the film's screening. Under the Sun received mostly positive reviews from critics.

== Synopsis ==
The film depicts a year in the life of a family in Pyongyang, North Korea, as their daughter, Zin-mi, prepares to join the Korean Children's Union on the Day of the Shining Star (Kim Jong-il's birthday). It opens with onscreen text that reads: "The script of this film was assigned to us by the North Korean side. They also kindly provided us with an around-the-clock escort service, chose our filming locations and looked over all the footage we shot to make sure we did not make any mistakes in showing the life of a perfectly ordinary family in the best country in the world". Scenes were staged for the camera, with multiple takes being filmed, and, allegedly, it was decided that Zin-mi's parents should be portrayed in the film as having different jobs than they have in real life.

== Production ==
Mansky conceived the project as a film set in a country similar to the Soviet Union. He envisioned it to be "a time machine" to the Soviet Union under Stalin, and a means to better understand his country's history. Prior to the project, Mansky stated that he had not previously visited North Korea and "only knew what most of us knew". After visiting the country, he felt that North Korea was "much more hard and cruel" than the Soviet Union, observing: "From the outside, it looks like the Soviet Union in the 1930s. But if you look deeper, there is a crucial difference. In the Soviet Union, we had culture – theatres, libraries, films. And the Soviet people were critical thinkers – they complained if there was something they didn't like. If you compare that to North Korea – they don't have any of those cultural memories. Everyone looks content, happy with the way things are. This is what I wanted to depict in the documentary."

Russian company Vertov.Real Cinema began negotiations to secure permission to shoot a film in North Korea in 2013. The negotiations with the North Korean Ministry of Culture lasted two years. The project was finalized as a portrait of an 8-year-old school girl named Zin-mi and her family in Pyongyang, focusing on her preparing to join the Korean Children's Union on the Day of the Shining Star (Kim Jong Il's birthday). The filmmakers received permission to make one research trip to North Korea, and were granted three different shooting periods of 15 days each. Per the contract, the Ministry of Culture would oversee and approve of every aspect of the filming process. They created the script, selected each of the characters, and approved of the cameras and scenes to be used in the film. Mansky and his crew would only be permitted to film approved scenes at specific locations designated by the government. The film crew would also be accompanied by North Korean handlers supervising the production. Co-producer Simone Baumann described the process as "unbearable" for Mansky, as he was used to having complete creative freedom on his projects. She stated that Mansky "couldn't leave his hotel room without a Korean official following after him".

After arriving in North Korea, Mansky was not permitted to go anywhere by himself, and could not directly speak with any of his subjects. Realizing that the North Korean government intended to make a propaganda film, Mansky decided to keep the cameras rolling between shots. The film crew captured footage of North Korean handlers staging scenes and instructing characters on how to behave and what dialogue to say. At this point, Mansky decided to change the concept of the film and use the unapproved footage to make a behind-the-scenes exposé.

The film was initially financed by Vertov.Real Cinema. Later, funding was provided by Saxonia Entertainment and MDR from Germany, and Hypermarket Films from the Czech Republic. Per the contract with the North Korean government, the North Korean Ministry of Culture received credit as a co-producer, although they did not provide any financial support for the film.

=== Filming ===
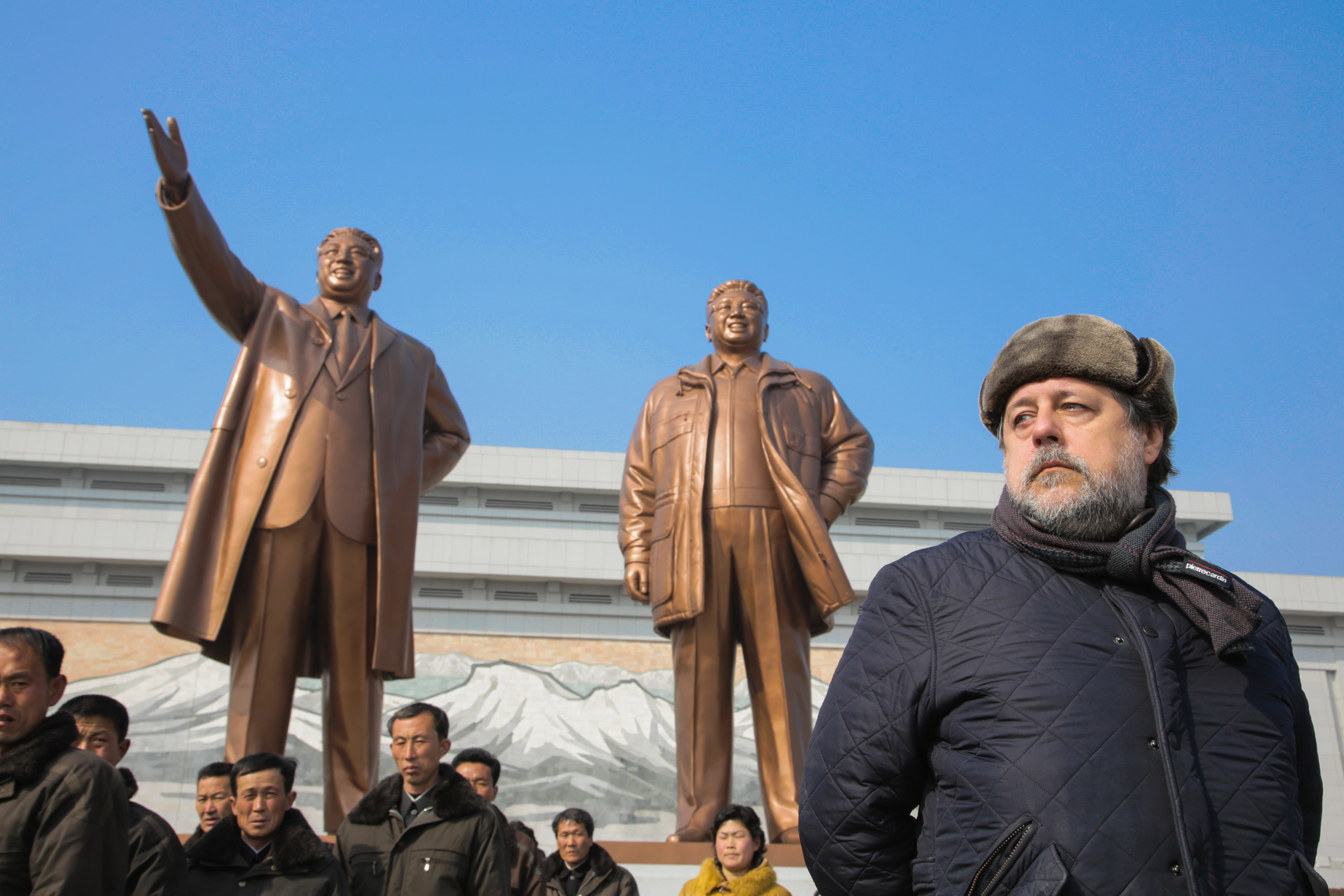
Mansky at the Mansu Hill Grand Monument in Pyongyang in 2014

North Korea permitted only Mansky, cinematographer Alexandra Ivanova, and a sound assistant to visit the country. Unknown to North Korean authorities, Mansky hired a Russian translator who was fluent in Korean, but had no experience in sound recording, to act as the sound assistant, explaining: "She [the translator] was our spy. It helped us know what they [the North Korean handlers] were planning for us." Mansky and his crew made three trips to North Korea, spending a total of two months in the country. Although the filmmakers had initially been granted three different shooting periods after their initial research trip, North Korean officials cancelled the scheduled third shoot, citing the Ebola outbreak. Baumann said about the cancelled visit: "Personally, I think they didn't like us shooting with any kind of slight aggravation", as "Manskiy would get frustrated with the North Koreans telling him how to film all the time, to the point where he would turn around and start filming them on set."

At the end of each day of filming, North Korean authorities would review the footage and delete scenes they deemed unacceptable. To get around this censorship and record unscripted moments, which Mansky captured by continuing to record with his digital cameras after the handlers yelled "cut", his crew employed a recording system that saved all footage to two separate memory cards, and Mansky submitted one of the cards to the North Koreans for inspection, while hiding the other copy. According to Baumann: "The camerawoman is very brave. She put [the memory card] in her trousers when she went to the toilet. They gave one of them to the North Koreans, and the second one they took with them." The film crew then smuggled the complete footage out of North Korea.

The version of the film containing scenes approved by North Korea is 60 minutes long, while the "director's cut" featuring unapproved footage is 106 minutes.

== Reception ==
=== Criticism ===
After discovering that Mansky and his crew had smuggled unapproved footage out of the country and included it in the finished film, North Korean authorities objected to the film's screening. The North Korean government lodged a complaint with the Russian Foreign Ministry, which was a production partner, seeking a ban on screenings of the film. Despite objection by some nationalist Russian politicians who support North Korea, the request was rejected by Russia, and the film was screened at film festivals in the country.

Following the film's release, Zin-mi's family condemned the project, claiming that it was made dishonestly and edited in a selective way to produce an "anti-North Korean movie". The family also claimed that it was Mansky who staged their daughter's scenes. Zin-mi's mother stated: "Vitaly Mansky directed her [Zin-mi], told her, do this, do that. We thought he was making the documentary for the purpose of a friendly cultural exchange. We did not know Mansky was such a black-minded person."

The film was screened at several film festivals around the world. It was released in theatres in Russia, South Korea, and other countries, and had a limited theatrical release in the United States between 6 July 2016 and 26 February 2017, grossing a total of $105,036 in the country. The film festival curator at the Museum of Modern Art in New York City chose not to screen Under the Sun, fearing the possibility of a cyber-attack by North Korean hackers similar to the one carried out in response to the satirical American film The Interview (2014). Museum spokeswoman Margaret Doyle later stated that MoMA had disavowed its previous decision, and the curator in question was no longer employed by the institution.

=== Critical response ===
Under the Sun received mostly positive reviews from critics. On the review aggregator website Rotten Tomatoes, 94% of 32 critics' reviews are positive, with an average score of 7.7/10. On Metacritic, the film has a weighted average score of 81 out of 100 based on reviews by 14 critics, indicating "universal acclaim".

Robert Boynton of New York University, author of a book on the North Korean abductions of Japanese citizens titled The Invitation-Only Zone, said: "This film confirms the reality that everything is stage-managed. That whatever we see is what they want us to see, that people's lines are fed to them, that everything is choreographed." Boynton also stated that he did not believe Zin-mi's family would suffer any consequences because of the film, adding: "I think the biggest fallout would be probably for, certainly the people who negotiated and allowed Mansky to enter the country, and secondly to the minders who guided his crew. They might be in trouble."

=== Awards and nominations ===
Year	Award	Category	Result
2015	Tallinn Black Nights Film Festival	Best Director	Won
2015	Jihlava International Documentary Film Festival	Best Documentary	Won
2016	Lielais Kristaps	Best Documentary	Won
2016	Millennium Docs Against Gravity	Grand Prix	Won
