= Day of the Shining Star =

Anniversary of Kim Jong Il's birth

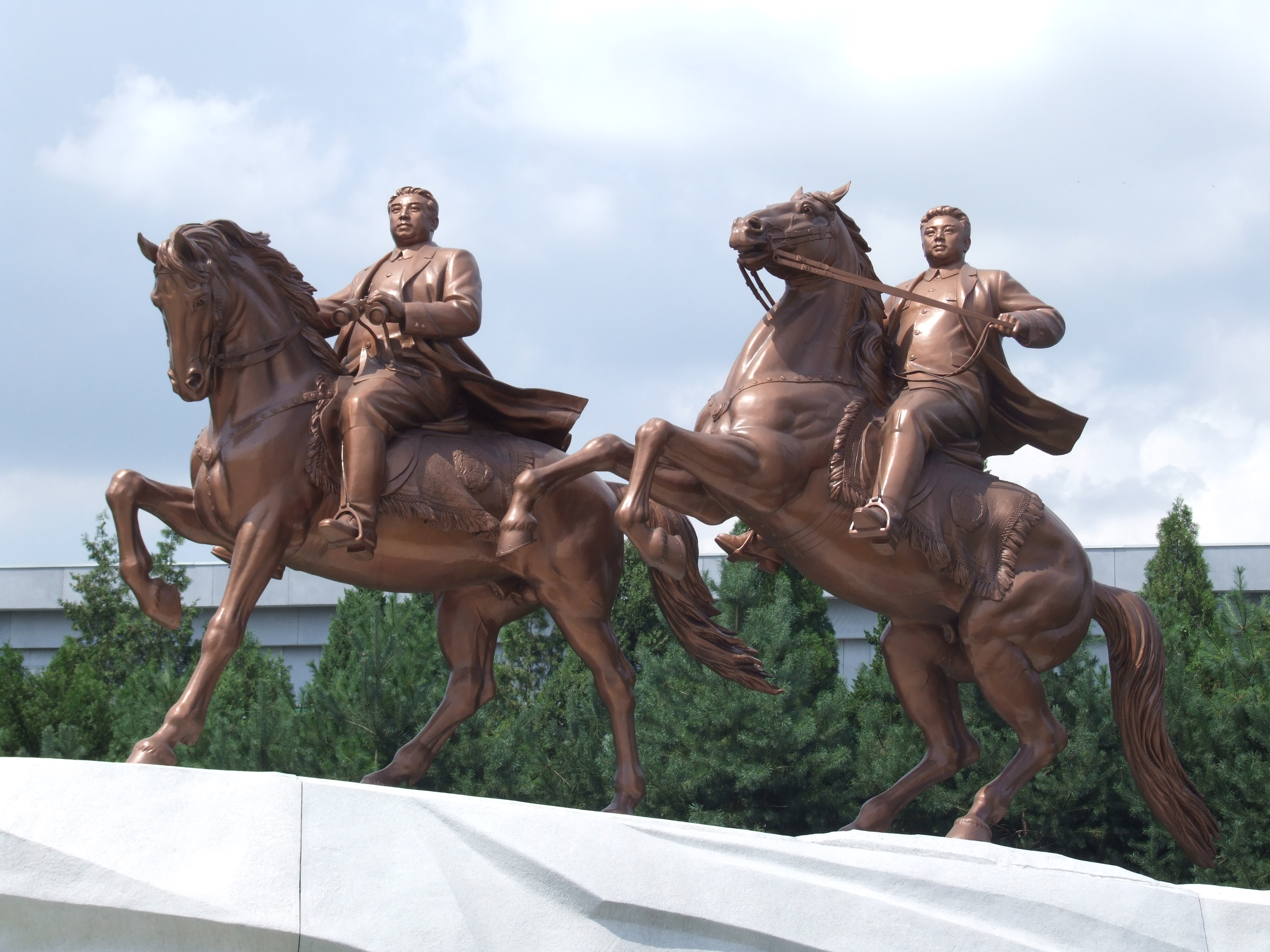
- Equestrian statue with Kim Jong Il (right) and Kim Il Sung, revealed on the Day of the Shining Star
- Observed by: North Korea
- Significance: Birth of Kim Jong Il (1941/1942) (Juche 30/31)
- Begins: 16 February
- Ends: 17 February
- Date: 16 February
- Duration: 2 days
- Frequency: Annual
- First time: After being designated in 1982
- Related to: Generalissimo Day (14 February), Loyalty Festival (between 16 February and 15 April), Day of the Sun (15 April), Day of Songun (25 August)

Korean name
- Hangul: 광명성절
- Hanja: 光明星節
- RR: Gwangmyeongseongjeol
- MR: Kwangmyŏngsŏngjŏl

The Day of the Shining Star (Korean: 광명성절) is a public holiday in North Korea falling on 16 February, the anniversary of the birth of the country's second leader, Kim Jong Il. Along with the Day of the Sun (April 15), the birthday of his father Kim Il Sung, the Shining Star day is one of the two most important public holidays in the country.

Kim Jong Il was born in 1941 (Juche 30) in the Soviet Union, although North Korean propaganda says the date is 16 February 1942 (Juche 31) and places the birth in the Mount Paektu area in Korea. His birthday became an official holiday in 1982 when he began his work in the Politburo of the Workers' Party of Korea. He celebrated his birthdays privately. In 2012, the year following his death, the holiday was renamed the Day of the Shining Star.

The most lavish observances occur in the capital, Pyongyang, and include mass gymnastics, music performances, fireworks displays, military demonstrations, and mass dancing parties. The North Korean people receive more food rations and electricity than usual on the Day of the Shining Star.

== Background ==
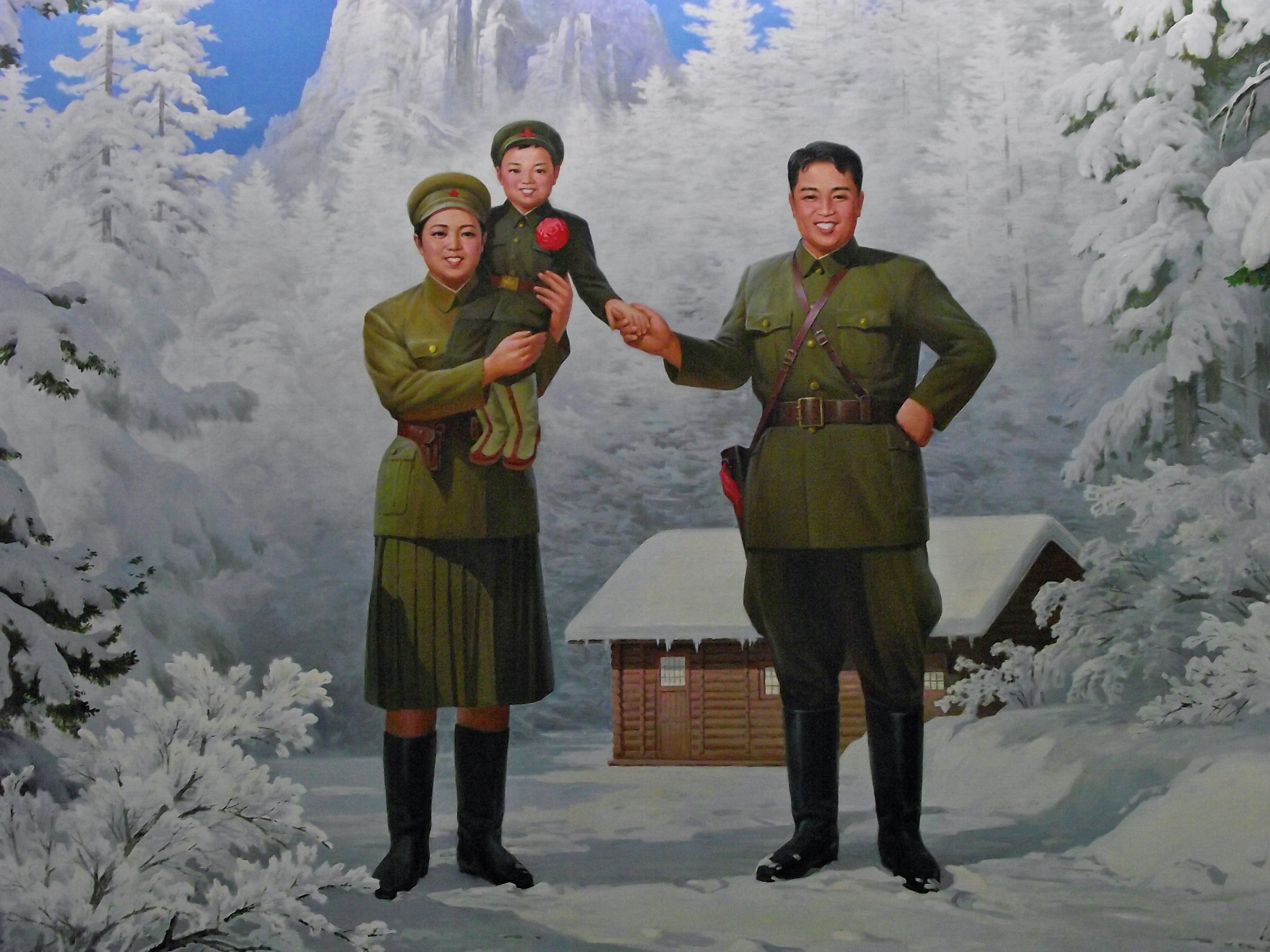
According to North Korean propaganda, Kim Jong Il was born in a secret camp at Mount Paektu on 16 February 1942.

Kim Jong Il was born in February 1941 to Kim Il Sung and Kim Jong-suk in Siberia in the Russian Federal Republic, Soviet Union. His father had been in exile because of his guerrilla activities. North Korean propaganda dates Kim Jong Il's birth to 16 February 1942. It locates it at the Mount Paektu area in Korea, the mythical place of origin of the Korean people, where Kim Il Sung supposedly ran a guerrilla camp. The guerrillas were based in Manchuria at the time, and Kim himself had been to the Soviet Far East before and after Kim Jong Il's birth.

In North Korean propaganda, Kim Jong Il is often associated with the star's image. He is most often referred to as the "bright star", although the "shining star" (광명성) is also used. According to legend, a bright star appeared in the sky the night he was born. Guerrilla fighters carved messages on trees (called guhonamu (구호나무)) proclaiming: "Three Heroes Shining in Korea with the Spirit of Mount Paekdu: Kim Il Sung, Kim Chŏng-suk, and Kwangmyŏngsŏng ('The Bright Star')" and "Oh! Korea! The Paekdu Star Was Born!"

== History ==
Kim's birthday was provisionally celebrated from 1976 onwards, but it became a national holiday only in 1982, two days after he became a member of the Politburo of the Workers' Party of Korea. When he ascended to the country's leadership, his birthday was marked as "The Spring of Humanity" on the North Korean calendar. Kim shunned public occasions on his birthdays. The anniversary received its present name in 2012, the year following his death, when the Politburo announced that: "February 16, the greatest auspicious holiday of the nation when the great leader Comrade Kim Jong Il was born, will be instituted as the Day of the Shining Star". An equestrian statue with Kim Jong Il and Kim Il Sung was revealed to commemorate the day.

On 12 February 2013, North Korea conducted its third nuclear test a few days before the Day of the Shining Star in celebration of it.

Since 2024, official usage of the term "Day of the Shining Star" had been reduced significantly, and the holiday was, in most cases, simply referred to as "2.16" or "the February holiday" (Korean: 2월의 명절; MR: 2wŏrŭi myŏngjŏl).

== Celebration ==
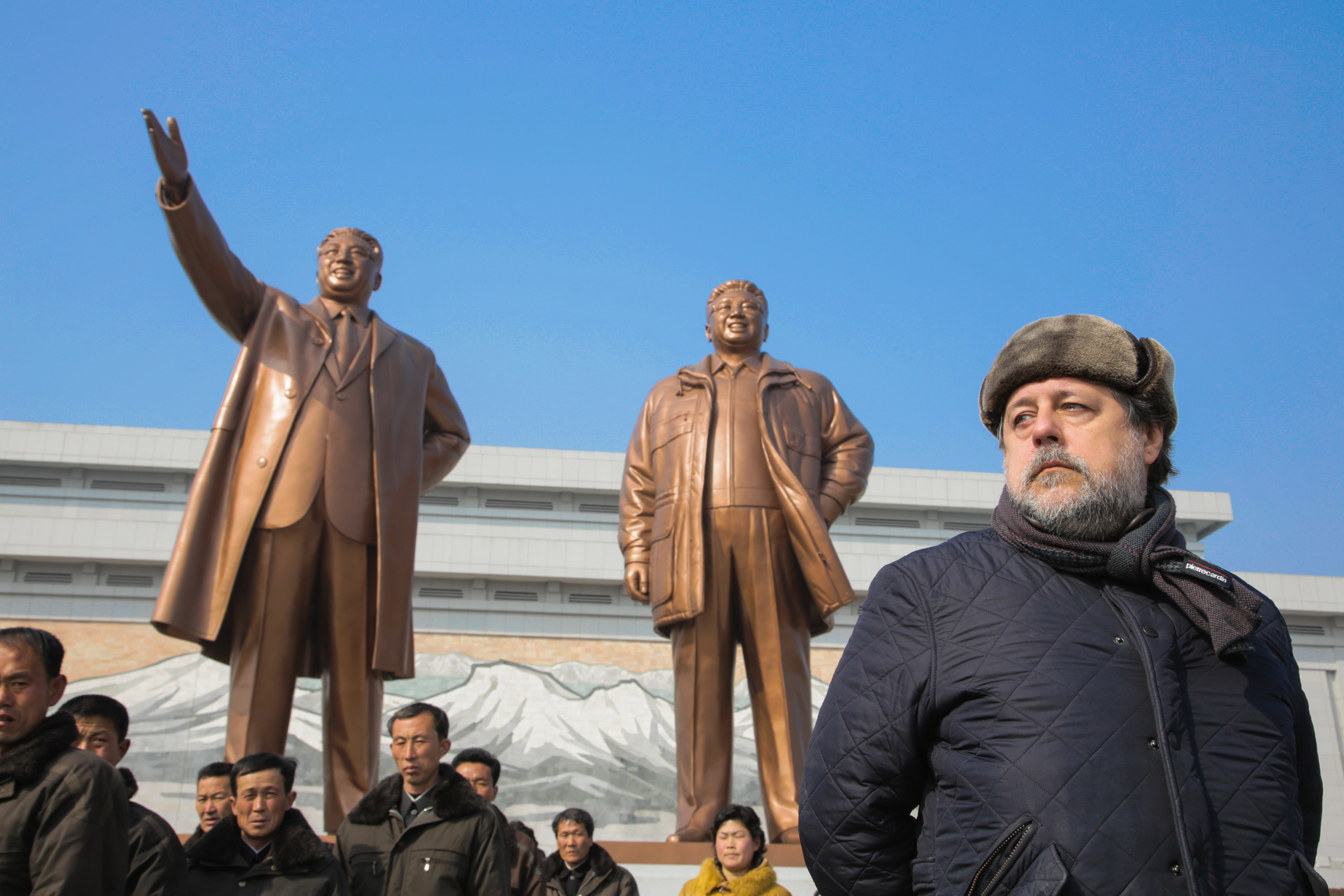
Film director Vitaly Mansky at the Mansu Hill Grand Monument around the Day of the Shining Star

The holiday begins on 16 February and lasts for two days. Celebrations are observed throughout the country. The capital, Pyongyang, has observances such as mass gymnastics, music performances, fireworks displays, military demonstrations, and mass dancing parties. Boulevards are lined up with flags and banners. Millions of people visit the Kumsusan Palace of the Sun where both Kim Il Sung and Kim Jong Il lay in state. Exhibitions of the bloom Kimjongilia take place. The hybrid begonia plant is named after Kim and has been cultivated to bloom around the Day of the Shining Star. The North Korean government often allocates more food and energy to the people on the Day of the Shining Star than they usually receive. Children are given candy, and it is one of the few occasions on which new members are admitted to the Korean Children's Union. Vitaly Mansky's 2015 documentary film Under the Sun chronicles the run-up to such a ceremony on the Day of the Shining Star.

Government and business offices, banks, and retail outlets close for its observance. Weddings are commonly held on this day.

The two month between the Day of the Shining Star and the Day of the Sun is known as the Loyalty Festival Period, and festivities occur throughout. On the calendar, the Day of the Shining Star takes place after the Generalissimo Day (대원수추대일, 14 February, commemorating Kim Jong Il's accession to the rank of Taewonsu) and before the International Women's Day (8 March). The Day of the Shining Star is one of three days celebrating Kim Jong Il on the calendar, the other two being the Generalissimo Day and the Day of Songun (25 August, commemorating the beginning of Kim's Songun, or army-first leadership).

== See also ==
- Kwangmyŏngsŏng program
- North Korean cult of personality
- Public holidays in North Korea
