= Artdocfest =

International documentary film festival held in Russia

Artdocfest International Documentary Film Festival
- Location: Moscow / Saint Petersburg (Russia), Riga (Latvia)
- Founded: 2007
- Founded by: Vitaly Mansky
- Hosted by: Directorate of the Russian national non-fiction films award "Lavrovaya vetv" ("Laurel branch”), Biedriba Artdoc Fest & Media
- Language: Russian, Latvian, English
- Website: https://artdocfest.com/

Artdocfest is an international festival of original documentary films. Artdocfest presents the brightest non-format documentaries of all genres. It was established in 2007 by the Directorate of the Russian national non-fiction films award "Lavrovaya vetv" ("Laurel branch"). Artdocfest is held annually in Moscow (Russia), in the first decade of December. Since 2014, it has also been held in Saint Petersburg (Russia) and Riga (Latvia).

In 2022, Mansky wrote that the festival “was destroyed by all that is happening in Russia today. This year almost all the films about current events were removed from the program. Even the festival video and print ads were censored. By the opening day the festival program had been completely censored. The festival was destroyed before it opened, and one way or another it would have been called off on March 31.”

== History ==
The Artdocfest documentary film festival was first held in Moscow in 2007. It was organized by the Directorate of the Russian national non-fiction films award and Vitaly Mansky, who headed the jury. The festival was created to support and promote films of the professional competition "Lavrovaya vetv", primarily from the categories "Best author's documentary" and "Best debut".

The first competition program included such films as "Herbarium" by Natalia Meshchaninova, "My class" by Ekaterina Eremenko, "Mother" by Pavel Kostomarov and Antoine Cattin,"Artel" by Sergei Loznitsa, "Far to London" by Yulia Kiseleva. The first jury consisting of Dmitry Bykov, Aidan Salakhova and Boris Yukhananov awarded the Grand Prix to Svetlana Fedorova's film "Not scary". The festival instantly gained popularity and attracted about 10 thousand viewers. For most of them, this was the only chance to get acquainted not only with Russian author's documentaries, but also with the best pictures of foreign festivals. In the first years the winners of IDFA and Leipzig international film festival were shown in non-competitive programs. Also Artdocfest became a platform for German, Czech Republic and other national film industries to be presented in Russia.

Since 2014, with the beginning of Russia's aggressive actions towards Ukraine, Russian state structures began to put pressure on the festival and its head. In the same year, the Minister of culture of Russia Vladimir Medinsky announced a ban on state support for all projects related to the festival.

In the following years, pressure continued on the festival's partners. The Ministry of culture of the Russian Federation, major Russian officials and parliamentarians sued the festival for some contrived formal occasions. Persecution was organized in the state media, including the country's main TV channels. Festival audience halls were attacked, some people were harmed.

In 2014, the festival's President Vitaly Mansky had to move in the Republic of Latvia. In the same year, Artdocfest was presented with its documentary program in cooperation with the Riga international film festival RigaIFF for the first time. As the pressure on the festival in Russia continued and censorship and administrative barriers are imposed to the free screening of the most vivid documentaries, the Latvian part of Artdocfest has expanded.

In 2018, the entire competition and the work of the Artdocfest jury was transferred to Riga. And in 2019, the winners of the festival were also announced in the city.

In 2020, the Riga international documentary film festival Artdocfest/Riga was created. The festival is organized jointly by the Latvian Directorate of Artdocfest, Biedriba Artdoc Fest & Media and leaders of the documentary film industry in the Baltic region.

In 2022, Mansky wrote that the festival “was destroyed by all that is happening in Russia today. This year almost all the films about current events were removed from the program. Even the festival video and print ads were censored. By the opening day the festival program had been completely censored. The festival was destroyed before it opened, and one way or another it would have been called off on March 31.”

== Online cinematheque Artdoc.Media ==
Online cinematheque Artdoc.Media was created to overcome governmental censorship in Russia. In a situationin which any film that the authorities do not like may be banned and never shown in cinemas, online cinematheque is the only way for Russian viewers to see free, independent documentaries. In addition, Artdoc.Media acts as IMDb for documentaries, storing data on all films created by authors from former Soviet countries.
