= Pyongyang Assembly Hall =

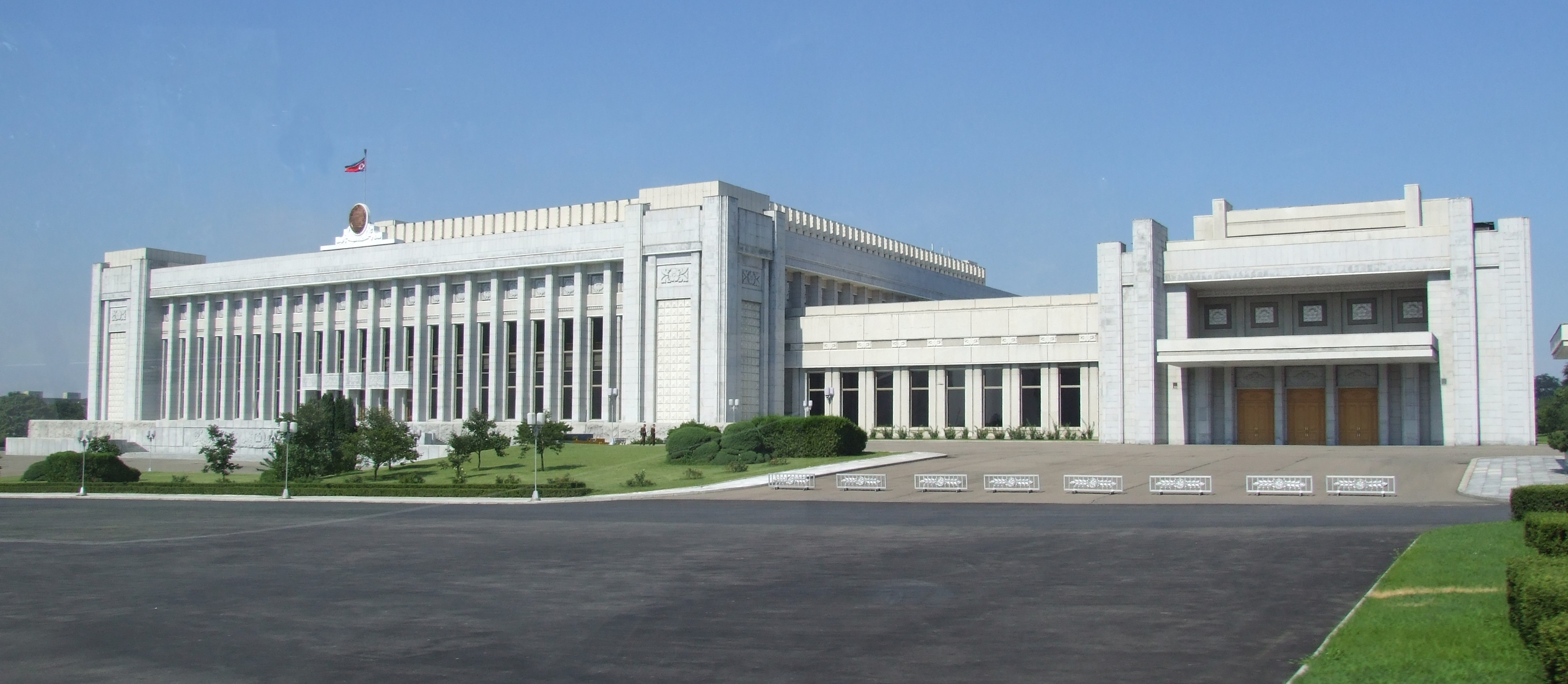
- The east side view of the Pyongyang Assembly Hall

General information
- Location: Mansu-dong, Chung-guyok, Pyongyang, North Korea
- Coordinates: 39°01′43″N 125°44′58″E
- Current tenants: Supreme People's Assembly
- Completed: October 1984; 42 years ago
- Owner: North Korean Government

Technical details
- Floor area: 45,000 square metres (480,000 sq ft)

Other information
- Seating capacity: 2,000
- Number of rooms: 200+

Korean name
- Hangul: 평양의사당
- Hanja: 平壤議事堂
- RR: Pyeongyang uisadang
- MR: P'yŏngyang ŭisadang

The Pyongyang Assembly Hall (Korean: 평양의사당), formerly known as the Mansudae Assembly Hall (만수대의사당), is the seat of the Supreme People's Assembly, the unicameral supreme state organ of power of North Korea. It is located in the North Korean capital of Pyongyang and sits adjacent to the Korean Revolution Museum. Before the Korean War the territory where the building is situated was the location of the former Pyongyang Women’s Prison.

Facilities include a main meeting hall covering an area of 4,300 square metres (46,000 sq ft) with 2,000 seats for parliament members as well as a simultaneous interpretation system in the hall which has the capacity of translating ten foreign languages at a time. The building is based on Soviet architectural influences with some Korean elements.

The area surrounding the front facade of the building has also been used as a site for public gatherings and musical performances. On 9 September 2022, a concert was held in the grounds of the then-Mansudae Assembly Hall commemorating the 74th Day of the Foundation of the Republic which was broadcast live on DPRK state television.
