= Public holidays in North Korea =

This is a list of public holidays in North Korea, known as myŏngjŏl (Korean: 명절; Hanja: 名節). See also the Korean calendar for a list of traditional holidays. As of 2017, the North Korean calendar has 71 official public holidays, including Sundays. In the past, North Koreans relied on rations provided by the state on public holidays for feasts. Recently, with marketization people are able to save up money and buy the goods they need.

The Day of the Sun, the birthday of its founder and first leader Kim Il Sung, on 15 April is the most important holiday in the country. The second most important is the Day of the Shining Star on 16 February, the birthday of Kim Jong Il. As of 2019, Kim Jong Un's birthday is still not a public holiday. Other holidays of great importance are the Party Foundation Day (10 October) and the Day of the Foundation of the Republic (9 September). North Koreans often schedule their wedding days on important national holidays.

North Korea regularly carries out missile and nuclear tests on such important anniversaries.

== List of annual holidays ==
Date	English name	Notes	Remarks	Local name
1 January	New Year's Day	Celebrates the opening of the Gregorian New Year.		양력설
15 January	Chosongul Day	The day commemorates the invention (1443) and the proclamation (1446) of Chosongul, the native alphabet of the Korean language. King Sejong the Great, inventor of Chosongul, is one of the most honored rulers in Korean history.		조선글날
8 February	Military Foundation Day	The Korean People's Army was established on 8 February 1948, and that day was celebrated as Army Day until 1978, when it was moved to 25 April, the date of the formation of Kim Il Sung's guerilla. It was moved back to 8 February in 2015.		인민군 창건일
16 February	Day of the Shining Star	Kim Jong Il's birthday.	2 days	광명성절
14 March	Tree Planting Day	People across the country plant trees.		식수절
8 March	International Women's Day	Commemorates the history of women across the country.		국제부녀절, 3.8절
last day of 12th lunar month	Seotdal Geumeum	Korean New Year, based on the Korean calendar.		설날
1st day of 1st lunar month	Seolmyeongjeol	Korean New Year, based on the Korean calendar.		설명절
15 April	Day of the Sun	Birthday of Kim Il Sung.	3 days	태양절
21 April	Kang Pan Sok's birthday	Commemorates the birth of Kim Il Sung's mother.		강반석녀사 탄생
15th day of 1st lunar month	Daeboreum	Based on the Korean calendar.		대보름
1st day of 2nd lunar month	Meoseumnal	Based on the Korean calendar.		머슴날
3rd day of 3rd lunar month	Samjinnal	Based on the Korean calendar.		삼짇날
105th day after Winter Solstice	Hansik	Based on the Korean calendar.		한식
8th day of 4th lunar month	Chopail	Based on the Korean calendar.		초파일
1 May	International Workers' Day (Labor Day)	Celebrates the economic and social achievements of workers.		국제로동절, 메데, 5.1절
1 June	International Children's Day	Global observance dedicated to advocating for peace, opposing aggression, and promoting the health and well-being of children.		국제아동절, 6.1절
6 June	Korean Children's Union Foundation Day	Public holiday marking the 1946 foundation of the Korean Children's Union.		조선소년단창립절
19 June	Anniversary of Kim Jong Il's commencement of work in the Workers' Party Central Committee	Officially a public holiday since 2015 but celebrated unofficially before, this holiday marks Kim Jong Il's 1964 graduation from Kim Il Sung University and start of work in the party organization.		
5th day of 5th lunar month	Dano	Based on the Korean calendar.		단오날
3 July	Day of the Strategic Forces	A new holiday established on 24 June 2016 by Ordinance No. 1177 of the Presidium of the Supreme People's Assembly which commemorates the foundation of the Korean People's Army Strategic Force on 3 July 1999.		전략군절
27 July	Day of Victory in the Great Fatherland Liberation War	The 1953 Korean Armistice Agreement		조국해방전쟁승리의 날, 전승절
15 August	Liberation Day	Established after the liberation of Korea in 1945.		조국해방의 날
25 August	Day of Songun	A new holiday established in 2013 commemorating Kim Jong Il's inspection visit to the Seoul Ryu Kyong Su Guards 105th Armored Division of the Korean People's Army on August 25, 1960, which is always regarded as the "start of the Songun revolutionary leadership" by the North Korean government.		선군절
28 August	Youth Day	Commemorates the founding of the Youth Communist League of Korea by Kim Il Sung in 1927		청년절
9 September	Day of the Foundation of the Republic	Founding of the Democratic People's Republic of Korea in 1948.		창건기념일, 9.9절
15th day of 6th lunar month	Yudu	Based on the Korean calendar.		류두
7th day of 7th lunar month	Chilseok	Based on the Korean calendar.		칠석
15th day of 7th lunar month	Baekjung	Based on the Korean calendar.		백중날
15th day of 8th lunar month	Chuseok	Based on the Korean calendar, North Korean Mid-Autumn Festival.		추석, 한가위
10 October	Party Foundation Day	Founding of the Workers' Party of Korea in 1945.		로동당 창건기념일
9th day of 9th lunar month	Jungyangjeol	Based on the Korean calendar.		중양절
16 November	Mother's Day	A new holiday from 2012 onward honoring all mothers.		어머니날
18 November	Missile Industry Day	Dedicated to celebrate a Hwasong-17 ICBM launch that took place on 18 November 2022.		로케트공업절
20 December	Dongji	Winter solstice, based on the Korean calendar.		동지
24 December	Kim Jong Suk's birthday	Commemorates the birth of Kim Jong Il's mother.		김정숙동지 탄생
27 December	Constitution Day	Enactment of the Socialist Constitution of North Korea in 1972.		사회주의헌법절,헌법절
31 December	New Year's Eve	Celebrates the closing of the Gregorian Year.		신년전야

== Momentous changes in political holidays in North Korean calendars ==
During some years, certain dates related with the Kim regime are additionally designated as public holidays for propaganda purposes.

In the 2014 version of the North Korean calendar, "Generalissimo Day" (대원수추대일) briefly became a holiday that honors when Kim Jong Il posthumously received the title "Generalissimo of the Democratic People's Republic of Korea" in 2012.

In the 2015 calendar, a new public holiday was to be celebrated on June 19, marking the date in 1964 when Kim Jong Il graduated from Kim Il Sung University and began working as part of the Party’s organizational leadership. Various events related to the commemorative day take place every year on this date in North Korea, but this was the first time it has been recognized as a national holiday.

In the 2017 calendar, July 3 became a public holiday called "Day of the Strategic Forces" (전략군절).

== See also ==
- Culture of North Korea
- List of Korean traditional festivals
- North Korean calendar
- Public holidays in South Korea
