= Vitaly Mansky =

Ukrainian documentary film director (born 1963)

- Виталий Манский
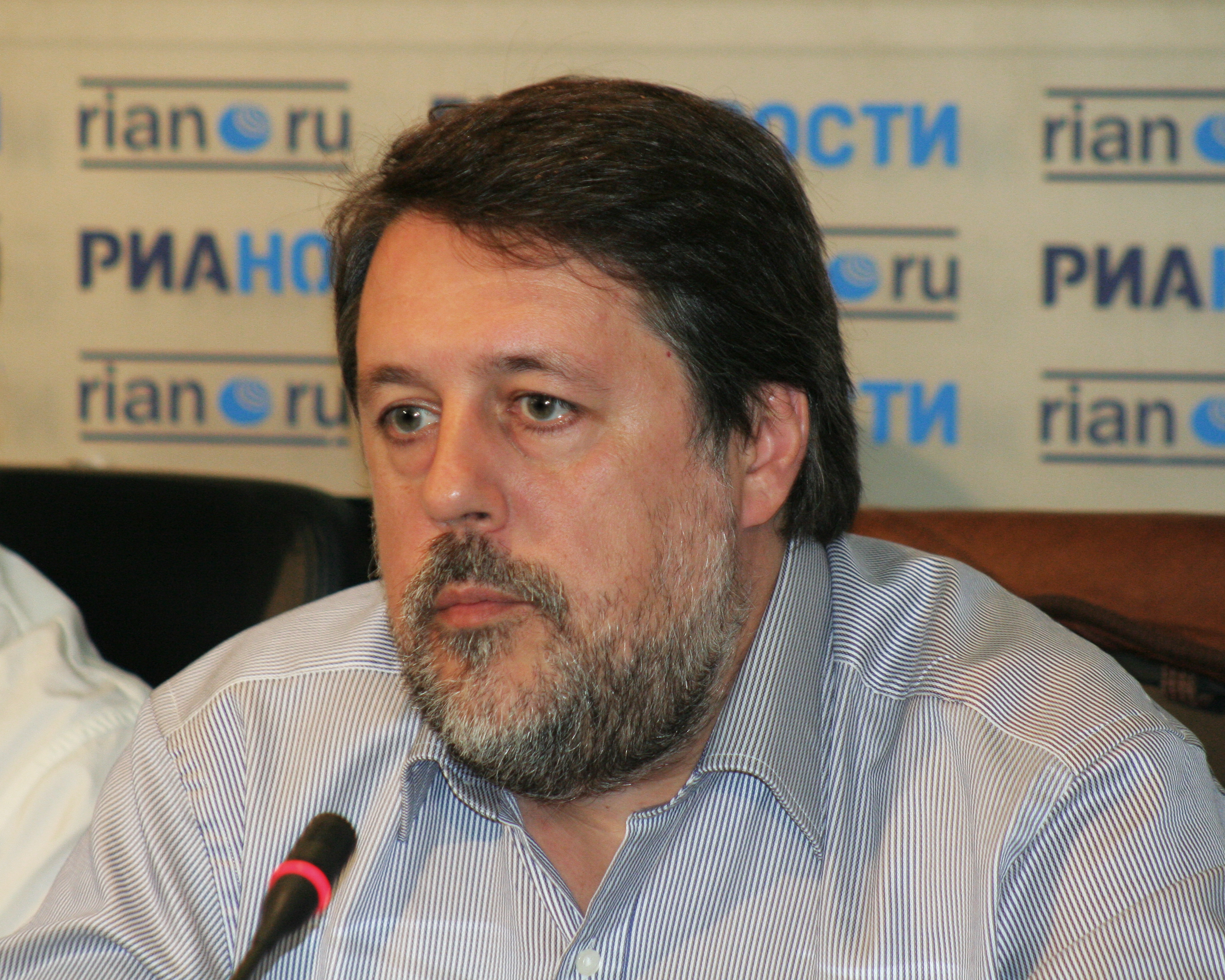
- 2010
- Born: Віталій Всеволодович Манський; 2 December 1963 (age 62); Lviv, Ukrainian SSR, USSR
- Citizenship: Russia; Latvia
- Education: Gerasimov Institute of Cinematography
- Occupations: Filmmaker, producer
- Years active: 1987–present
- Spouse: Natalya Manskaya
- Children: 2

Vitaly Vsevolodovich Mansky (Ukrainian: Віталій Всеволодович Манський, Latvian: Vitālijs Manskis; born 2 December 1963 in Lviv, Ukrainian SSR, Soviet Union) is a Ukraine-born Russian and Latvian documentary film director. He is the founder of a festival of documentary movies, ArtDocFest and has resided in Riga since 2014. Artdocfest has since collaborated with the Riga International Film Festival.

== Political Stances ==
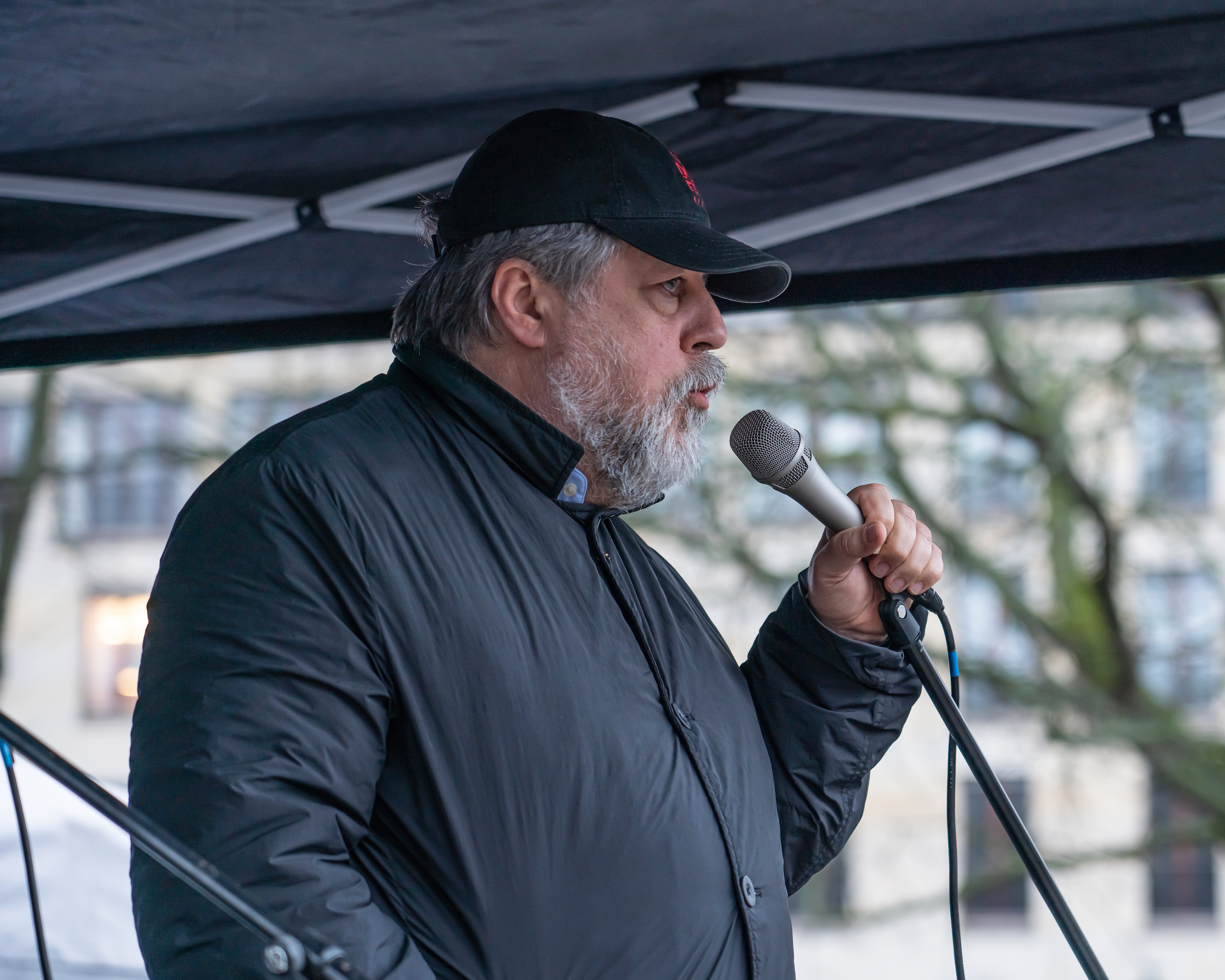
Vitaly Mansky in February 2023, speaking at a Ukraine solidarity rally in Berlin

In March 2014, Mansky signed an open letter in solidarity with Ukrainian filmmakers following the Russian annexation of Crimea.

In 2018, he supported the European Film Academy's appeal in defense of Ukrainian filmmaker Oleg Sentsov, who was imprisoned in Russia.

In December 2020, Mansky went for a solitary manifestation outside the Federal Security Service building at the Lubyanka Square, holding men's underpants. The manifestation took place after the publication of opposition leader Alexei Navalny's conversation with his alleged poisoner. He was arrested for employing "visual means of propaganda and agitation".

In February 2022, Mansky spoke out against the Russian invasion of Ukraine. In April the same year, he expressed his anti-war views at a rally in Riga. As a result of his views, the Russian Interior Ministry added him to their wanted list in September 2022 for slander, following a request by cinematographer Nikita Mikhalkov. On June 16, 2023, Russian Ministry of Justice included Mansky in its "foreign agents" list.

== Selected filmography ==
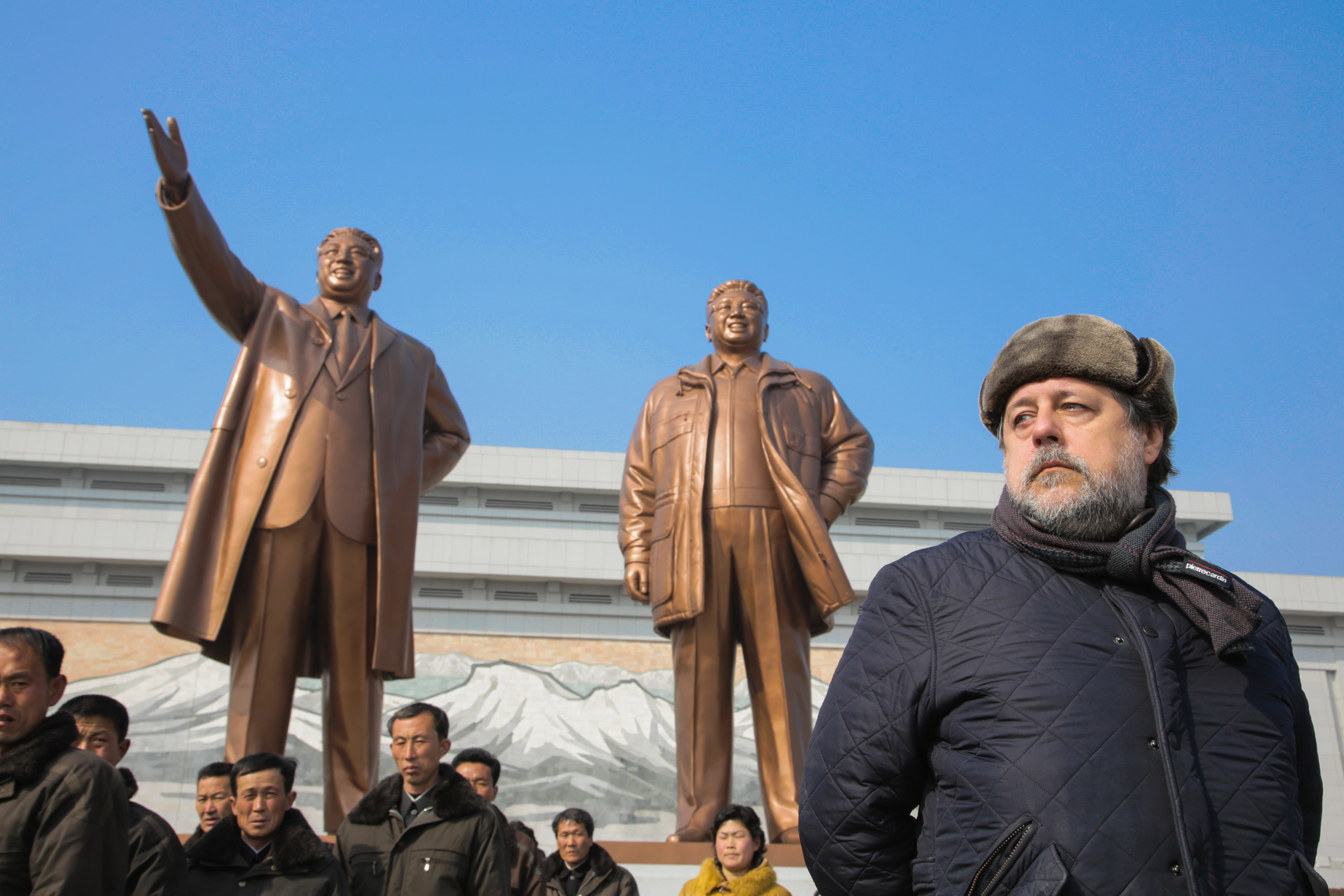
Mansky in North Korea filming Under the Sun

- Vladimir & Oksana in Love Country (2022, TV series)
- Gorbachev. Heaven (2020)
- Putin's Witnesses (Свидетели Путина, Putina liecinieki, Svědkové Putinovi) 2018
- Rodnye (Close Relations) 2016
- Under the Sun (В лучах солнца; V paprscích slunce) 2015
- Pipeline (Tруба; Die Trasse) 2013
- Patria o Muerte / Motherland or Death 2011
- Gagarin's Pioneers (Our Motherland) 2006
- Anatomiya TATU (Anatomy of t.A.T.u.) 2003
- Etyudy o Lyubvi (1994)
- Srezki Ocherednoy Voyny (1993)
- Yevreyskoe Schaste (1991)
