= Il-sung =

- Hangul: 일성
- RR: Ilseong
- MR: Ilsŏng

Il-sung, also spelled Il-seong, is a Korean given name. It was the fifth-most popular name for baby boys in 1940, according to South Korean government data.

People with this name include:

- Ilseong of Silla (fl. 134–154), Silla Dynasty ruler
- Kim Il Sung (1912–1994), North Korean leader
- Kazunari Okayama (born Kang Il-sung, 1978), Japanese football player
- Ri Il-song (born 2004), North Korean footballer

== See also ==
- List of Korean given names
