= Day of the Sun =

North Korean holiday on 15 April

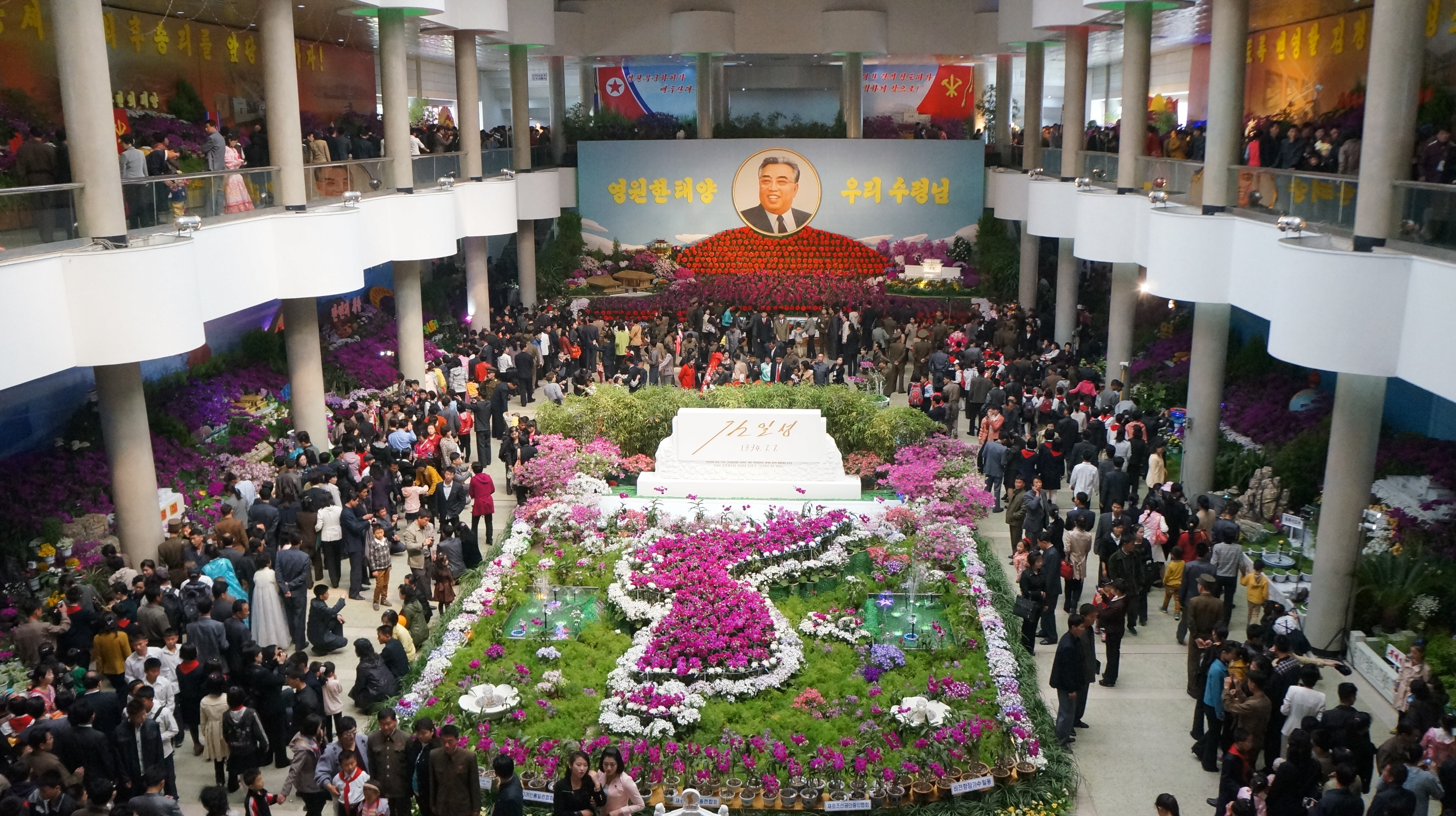
- A flower exhibition of Kimilsungias on the Day of the Sun at the Kimilsungia-Kimjongilia Exhibition House
- Observed by: North Korea
- Significance: Birth of Kim Il Sung (1912)
- Observances: Visits to statues of Kim Il Sung and his mausoleum, fireworks, performances, sports competitions, folk dances.
- Date: 15 April
- Duration: 3 days
- Frequency: Annual
- First time: After being designated on 1962
- Related to: Day of the Shining Star (16 February), Loyalty Festival (between 16 February and 15 April), Sun Festival (throughout April), April Spring Friendship Art Festival

Korean name
- Hangul: 태양절
- Hanja: 太陽節
- RR: Taeyangjeol
- MR: T'aeyangjŏl

The Day of the Sun (Korean: 태양절) is an annual public holiday in North Korea held on 15 April, the birth anniversary of founder and Eternal President of North Korea, Kim Il Sung It is the most important national holiday in the country, and is considered the North Korean equivalent of the Western holiday season. Kim's birthday, which had been an official holiday since 1968, was renamed Day of the Sun in 1997, three years after his death. The name takes its significance from his name: Il-sung (Korean for 'become the Sun').

North Koreans commemorate the holiday by visiting locations that have a connection with the leader's life, such as thousands of statues scattered across the country, or Mangyongdae, his birthplace in the capital Pyongyang. The most important observances take place in the capital, including visits to the Kumsusan Palace of the Sun, where Kim Il Sung's body lies in rest, and the Mansu Hill Grand Monument, which features a very tall statue of the leader.

The state seeks to provide its citizens with more food and electricity than is normally available, although this is not always achieved. Children, in particular, receive candy and other gifts attributed to the love shown by the leaders.

Festivities are not confined to the specific date. Commemorations occur from 16 February, which is the birthday of Kim Jong Il, during what is known as the Loyalty Festival. Celebrations in April around the Day of the Sun are called the Sun Festival. The day itself is followed by two days of rest, making it a three-day holiday.

== Background ==
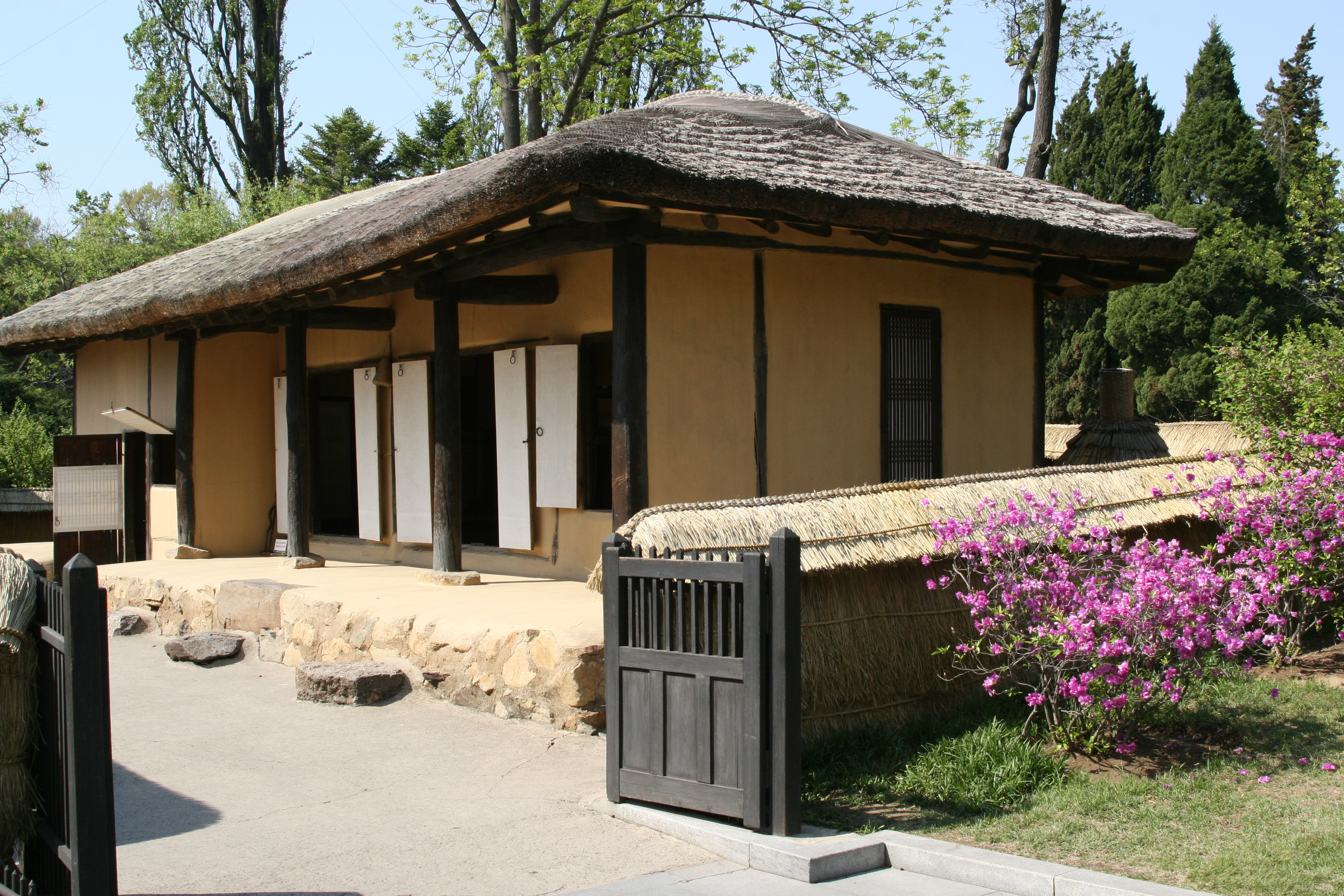
Birthplace of Kim Il Sung in Mangyongdae

Kim Il Sung was born on 15 April 1912 in the village of Mangyongdae, which is now a suburb of North Korea's capital Pyongyang. He has been long identified with the sun and is frequently called "Sun of the Nation". He adopted the name Il-sung, meaning 'become the Sun' in 1935 as one of his noms de guerre.

== History ==
Kim Il Sung's birthday had been designated as a provisional holiday in 1962. It became official in 1968, the year that saw great expansion of his cult of personality in the aftermath of a domestic political crisis known as the Kapsan faction incident. In 1974, the day was promoted the most important holiday of the country. It was designated as "The Day of the Sun" on 8 July 1997, the third anniversary of the death of Kim Il Sung, in a resolution by the Central Committee of the Workers' Party of Korea, the Central Military Commission, the National Defence Commission, the Central People's Committee and the Administration Council of the Democratic People's Republic of Korea. On the same occasion, North Korea adopted the Juche calendar which begins on the year of Kim Il Sung's birth. The purpose of the Day of the Sun was to celebrate "the greatest festival for the Korean nation," and to initiate a holiday which would be of equal importance to North Koreans as Christmas is in many other places.

Every fifth and tenth anniversary is marked with more pronounced celebrations than usual. 2012 marked the centenary of the birth of Kim Il Sung. On the Day of the Sun that year, current leader Kim Jong Un gave his first public speech. Massive military parades are held on the Day of the Sun and the country's most advanced weapons are displayed. In 2012 North Korea conducted a failed missile test and the new KN-08 missile was introduced in a parade. In 2020, Kim Jong Un was absent from Day of the Sun celebrations, sparking speculation about his health, but he returned in 2021, visiting his grandfather's mausoleum at the Kumsusan Palace of the Sun and attending a propaganda concert.

From 2024 onward, the term "Day of the Sun" has been used less frequently, and the holiday has been simply referred to as "4.15" or "the April holiday" (4월의 명절; 4wŏrŭi myŏngjŏl). It has been speculated that this was done to strengthen Kim Jong Un's cult of personality while weakening that of Kim Il Sung.

== Celebration ==
Preparations take more than a month. Through April there are exhibitions, fireworks, song and dance events, athletics competitions, Juche seminars and visits to places connected with Kim Il Sung's life, including his birthplace in Mangyongdae. Some of these events take several days. Foreign art groups and dignitaries are invited to visit North Korea during this time around the day itself known as Sun Festival. The annual Kimilsungia Festival (held since 1998) and the April Spring Friendship Art Festival (since 1982) are also held at around the time of the Day of the Sun. The latter typically features foreign performers from some 20 countries whose televised performances are an anticipated and well-liked rare glimpse of foreign culture for North Koreans. It also includes the Pyongyang Marathon.

As early as midnight on the morning of Day of the Sun, people lay commemorative wreaths and floral baskets at thousands of statues of Kim Il Sung around the country. The demand for flowers is huge. The market – mostly operating informally – is estimated to be worth 600,000–1,200,000 dollars just for the Day of the Sun. Artificial flowers are favored for their low cost. In the evening, youth dress in hanbok to participate in folk dances.

The main observances take place in the capital city of Pyongyang. Some of the rituals are quite elaborate. Flowers are laid in front of Kim Il Sung's statue on Mansu Hill. People pay respects at the Kumsusan Palace of the Sun where his body lies in state. In particular, leader Kim Jong Un has paid his respects at the palace every year. In the past, Pyongyang also often hosted the Arirang Mass Games to coincide with the celebration of the Day of the Sun. There has been an evening fireworks display in Pyongyang since 2009 and its design has been attributed to Kim Jong Un.

The state serves special foods such as meat and liquor as well as necessities to the people on the Day of the Sun to signal that all well-being is thanks to the care of the leader. The state tries to maintain a stable supply of electricity for the day to allow people to watch television, while theaters show special movies. The food situation varies. According to North Korean defector Kim Hyun-hwa: "The Sun Festival is one of the few occasions during which everyone can eat to their heart's content. Even those who go hungry on a regular basis usually manage to obtain three meals on this day. This is because North Korea marks it as the biggest holiday for the Korean people." However, in 2015 the state reportedly failed to distribute rations and did not deliver middle-school uniforms that schoolchildren were expecting to receive.

Children under the age of 12 receive bags of one kilogram (2.2 lb) of candy and cookies at ceremonies at school. Upon receiving this gift, they bow in front of portraits of Kim Il Sung and Kim Jong Il in the classroom and say: "Thank you, the Great Leader Grandfather! And, thank you Father!" Schoolchildren also prepare performances well in advance. On the 11th through 12th their teachers choose the best ones for the Day of the Sun. The Day of the Sun is one of the few occasions on which the Korean Children's Union admits new members.

Government and business offices, banks, and retail close for the Day of the Sun. It is also a common holiday for weddings. The Day of the Sun is followed by two days of rest, making it a three-day holiday. The day following the Day of the Sun typically features political meetings in which the attendees swear allegiance to the Ten Principles of the ideological system.

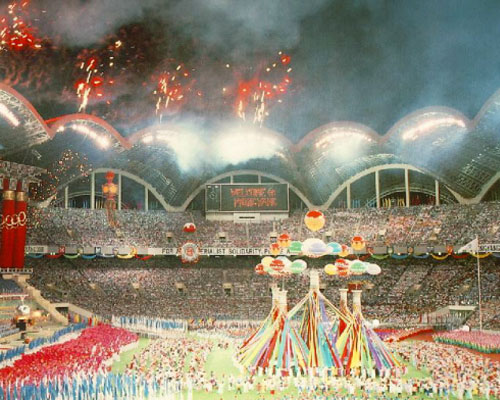
Arirang Mass Games were often held on the Day of the Sun until 2013.

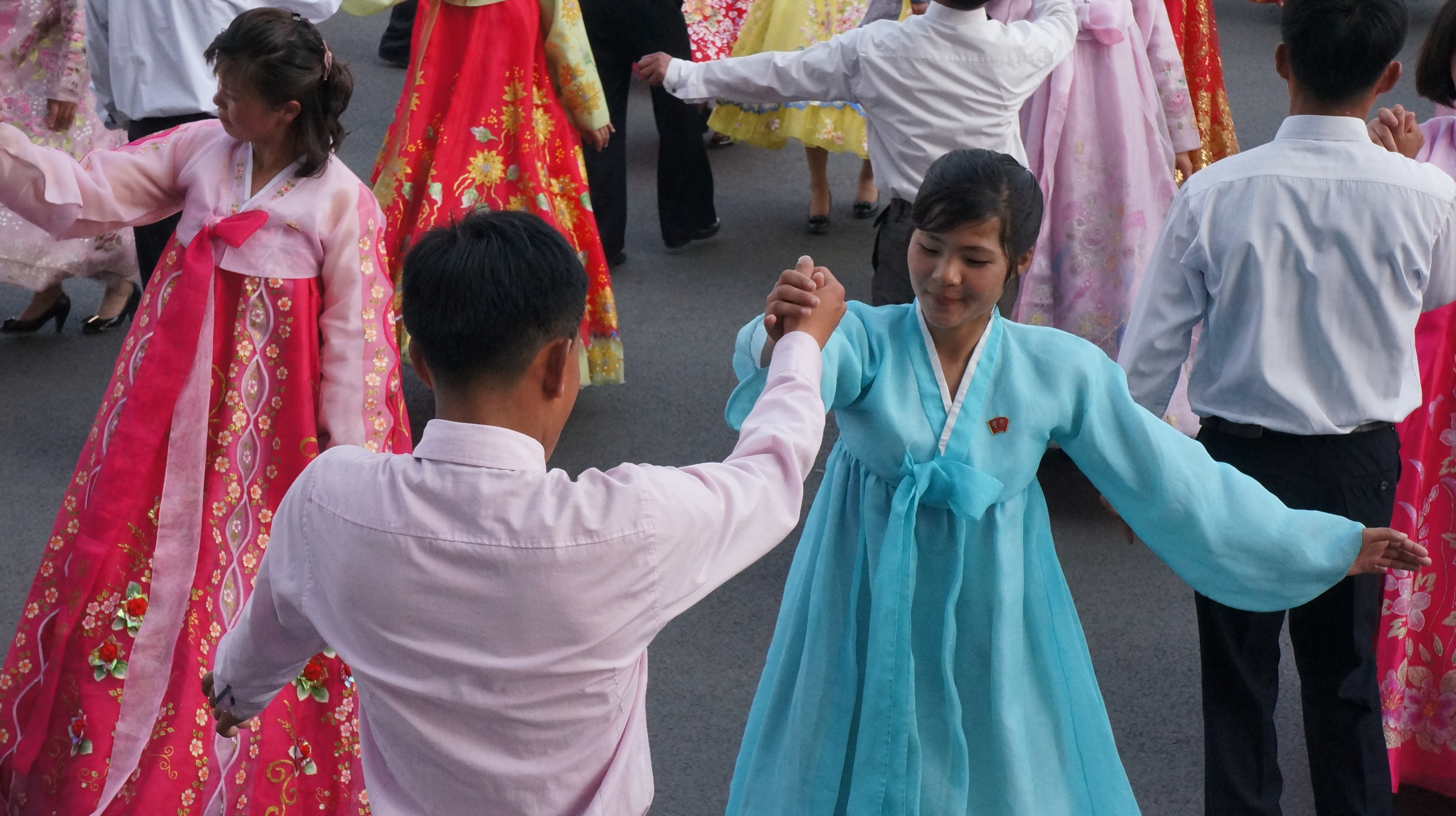
Women dress in Chosŏn-ot (hanbok) for dancing folk dances on the Day of the Sun.

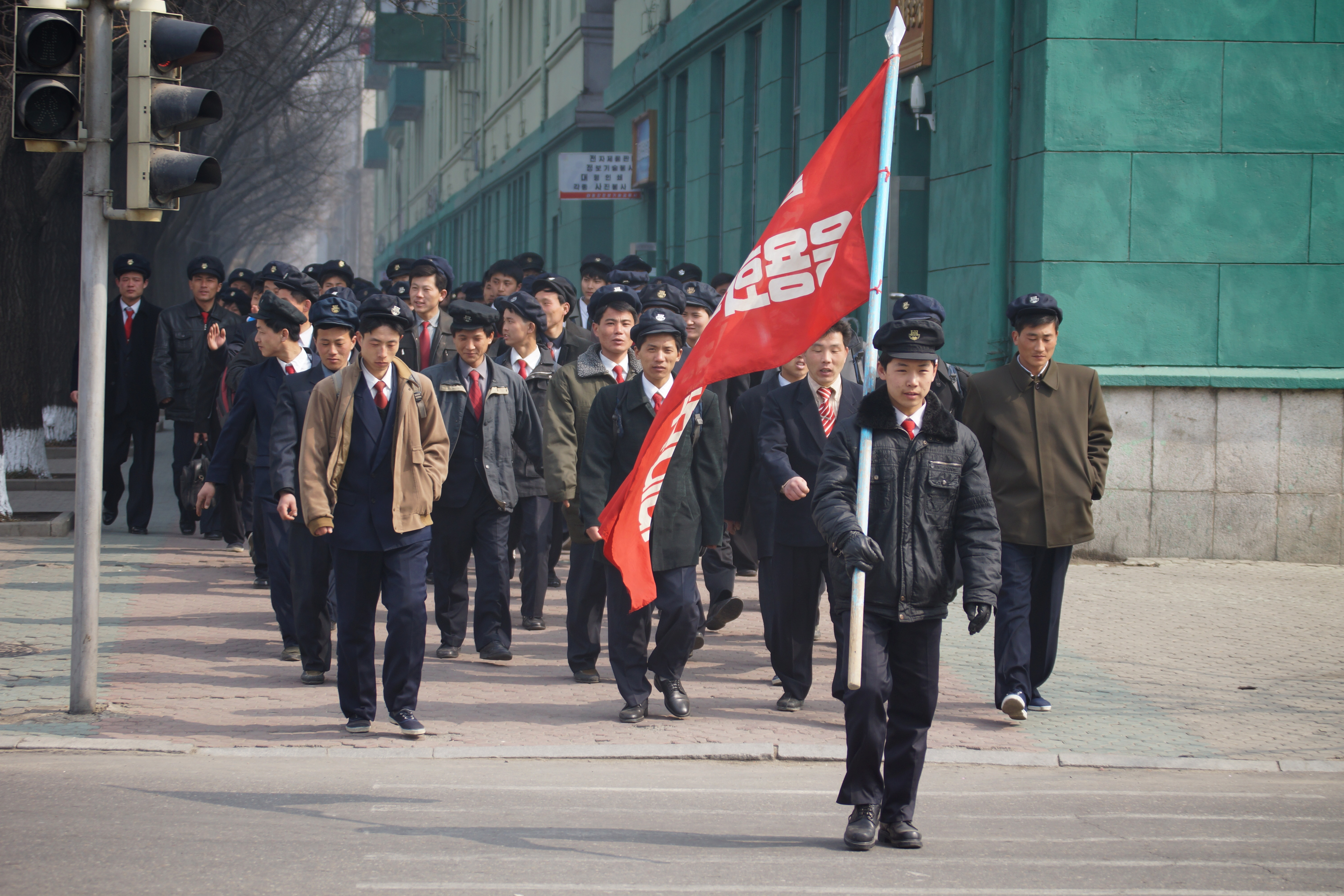
WPK cadres in Pyongyang on their way to celebrations of the 100th anniversary of Kim Il Sung's birth

== Loyalty Festival ==
A similar holiday exists for 16 February, the birthday of former leader Kim Jong Il, known as the Day of the Shining Star. The two-month period between the Day of the Shining Star and the Day of the Sun is known as the Loyalty Festival Period and festivities occur throughout.

== See also ==
- North Korean cult of personality
- Presidents' Day
- Public holidays in North Korea
