= Kumsusan Palace of the Sun =

Mausoleum in Pyongyang, North Korea

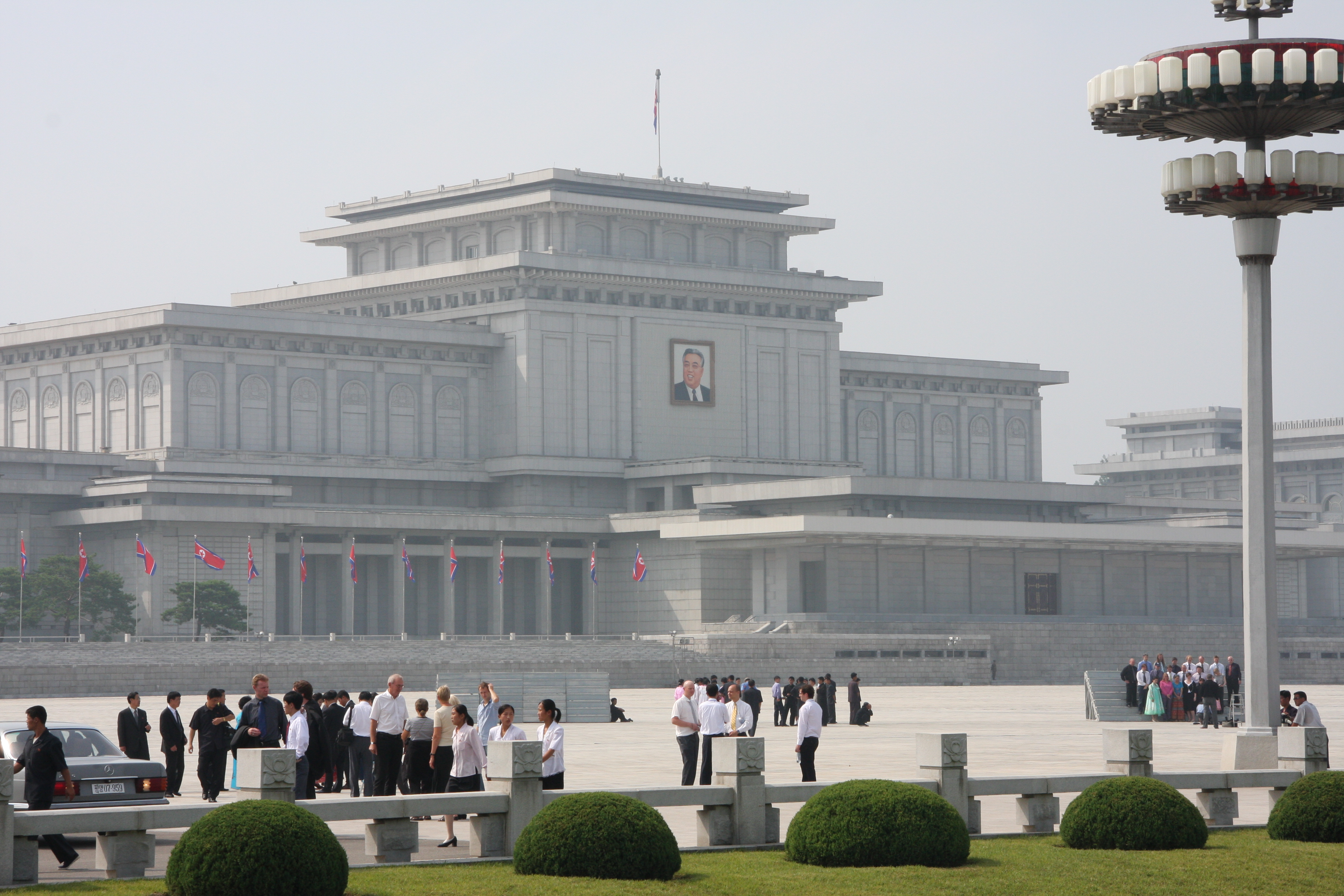
- Interactive map of the Kumsusan Palace of the Sun area

General information
- Architectural style: Modern, neoclassical
- Location: North Korea
- Coordinates: 39°3′51″N 125°47′15″E
- Completed: 1976; 50 years ago
- Opened: 8 July 1995; 31 years ago (for Kim Il Sung) 17 December 2012; 13 years ago (current form)
- Owner: North Korean Government

Website
- http://www.naenara.com.kp/main/index/en/exhibition

Korean name
- Hangul: 금수산태양궁전
- Hanja: 錦繡山太陽宮殿
- RR: Geumsusan taeyang gungjeon
- MR: Kŭmsusan t'aeyang kungjŏn

The Kumsusan Palace of the Sun (Korean: 금수산태양궁전), formerly the Kumsusan Memorial Palace (금수산기념궁전), is the mausoleum where the preserved bodies of Kim Il Sung and Kim Jong Il, the eternal leaders of North Korea, are displayed. Located near the northeast corner of the city of Pyongyang, the memorial has been renovated from the Kumsusan Assembly Hall (금수산의사당), Kim Il Sung's official residence and office.

The palace has been described as the "sacred temple of Juche" (주체의 최고성지) and is noted in the Socialist Constitution as the "eternal sanctuary of the entire Korean nation," being preserved as a national landmark.

== Overview ==
Inside the palace, the embalmed bodies of Kim Il Sung and Kim Jong Il are preserved and displayed within clear glass sarcophagi, housed within separate "Hall of Eternal Life" (영생홀). Their heads rest on traditional Korean buckwheat pillows and their bodies are covered by the flag of the Workers' Party of Korea.

At 115,000 square feet (10,700 m^{2}), Kumsusan is the largest mausoleum dedicated to a Communist leader and the only one to house the remains of multiple people. Some halls inside the building are up to 1 kilometre (3,300 ft) long. It is fronted by the Kumsusan Palace of the Sun Square Parklands (금수산태양궁전광장공원), which is approximately 500 metres (1,600 ft) in length, and is bordered on its northern and eastern sides by a moat.

The palace is accessed via an underpass across the road at security screening facilities, which is serviced by a tram stop.

== Gallery ==
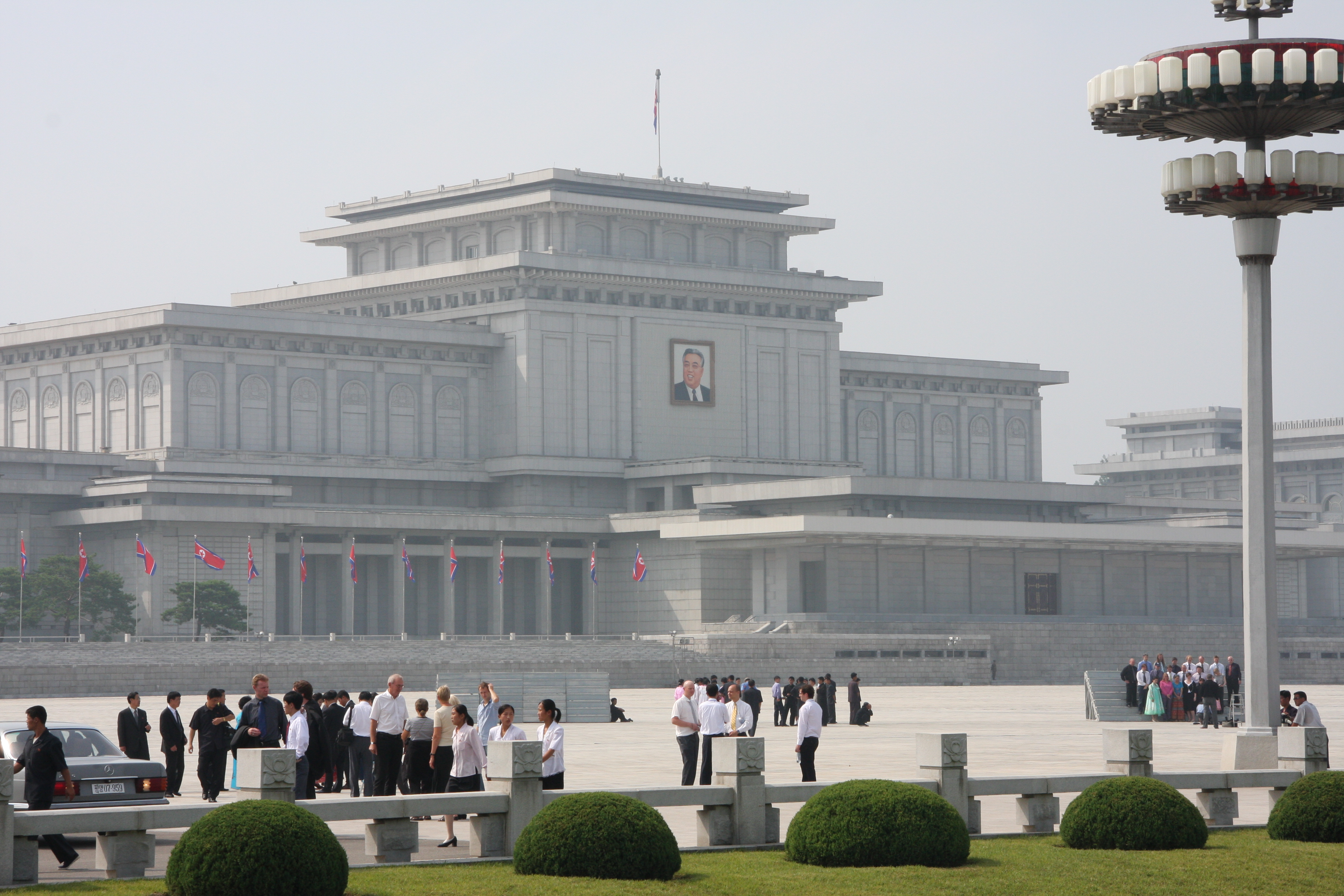
Kumsusan Memorial Palace, with Kim Il Sung (2008).

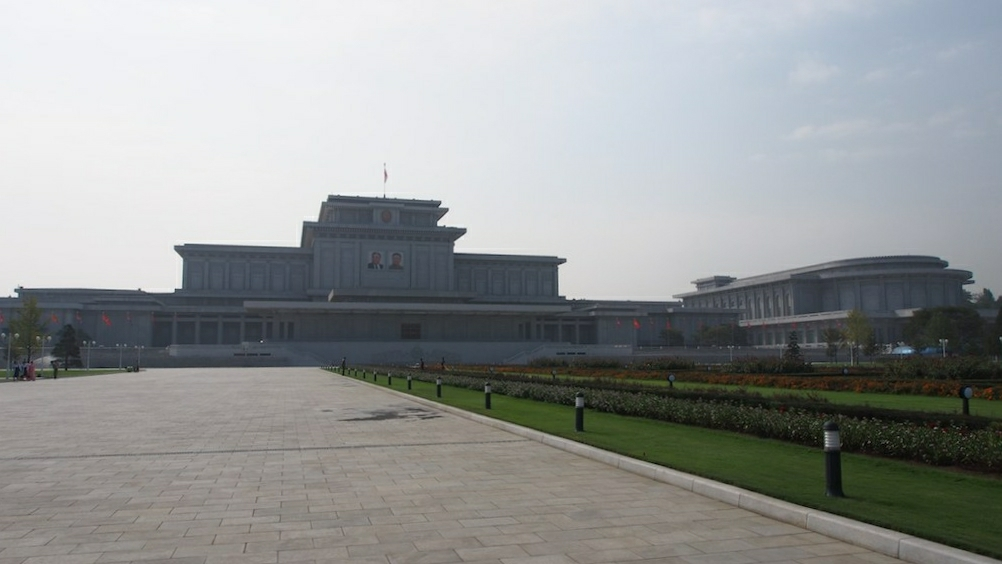
Kumsusan Palace of the Sun, with both Kim Il Sung and Kim Jong Il (2013).

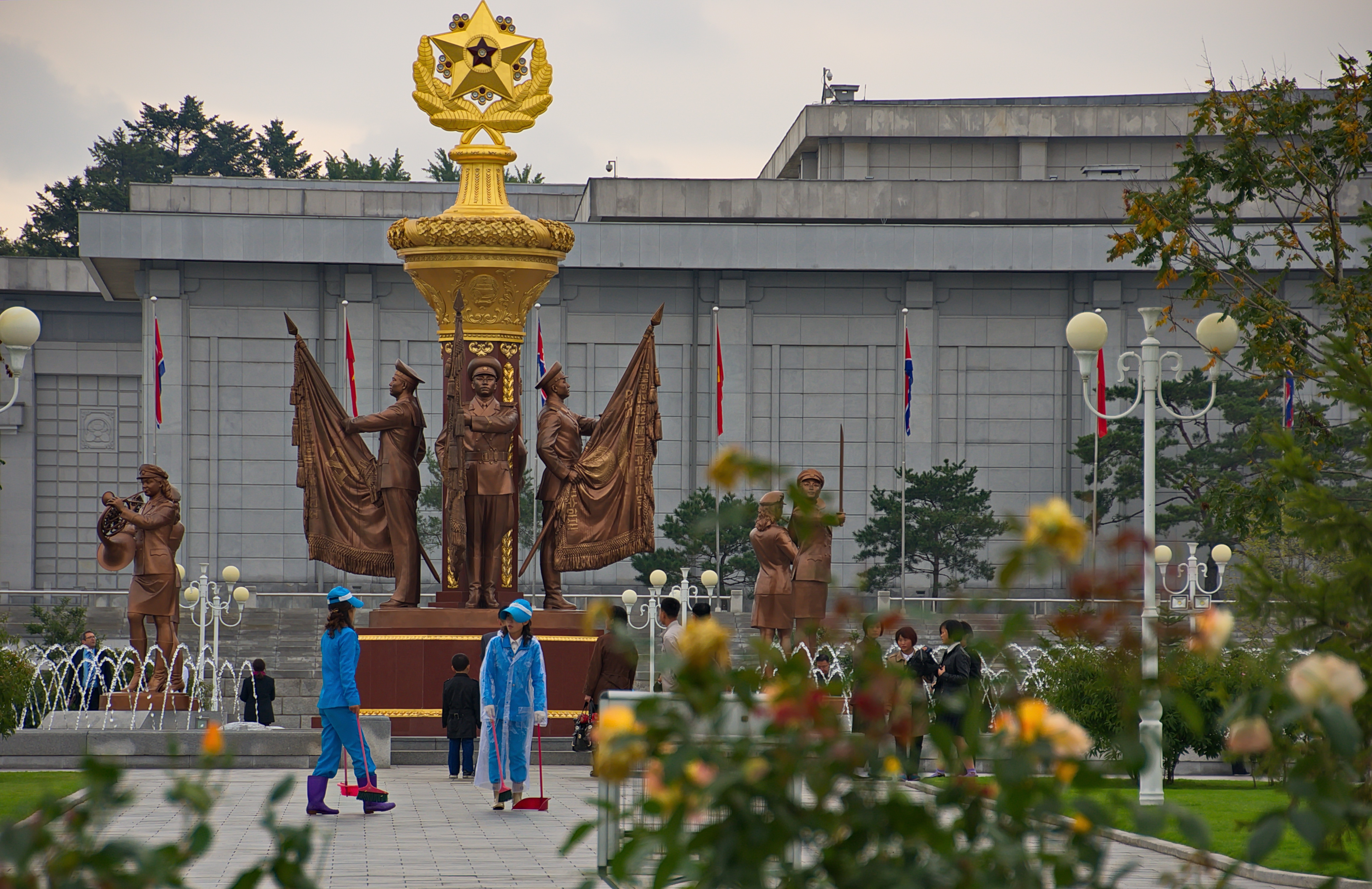
Portion of the Kumsusan Palace of the Sun Square Parklands (2015).

== History ==
The palace was built in 1976 as the Kumsusan Assembly Hall (금수산의사당) and served Kim Il Sung's official residence. It was used as Kim's primary workplace and was noted for being the venue for hosting various dignitaries and foreign delegations.

Following Kim Il Sung's death in 1994, the building was renovated and transformed into his mausoleum. Original ideas for a memorial included a hall on Kim Il Sung Square similar to the Lenin Mausoleum, a complex at the Mansudae Grand Monument or a shrine at his birthplace in Mangyongdae. However, Kim Jong Il decided that Kim should be preserved at a place where he was "known by and worked for the people." The interior of the building was significantly renovated from an office and residence to memorial hall, believed to have cost at least $100 million, with some sources put the figure as high as $900 million. The monument was renamed as the Kumsusan Memorial Palace (금수산기념궁전) and opened on 8 July 1995.

After Kim Jong Il's death in 2011, his body lay in state at the palace for 10 days. Following this period, on 28 December 2011, the palace served as the start and end point for a 40-kilometre (25 mi) funeral procession lasting three hours. On 12 January 2012, the North Korean government confirmed that Kim Jong Il's preserved remains would be put on permanent display in the palace, and on 16 February, in a military parade held in its grounds, the building was formally renamed the Kumsusan Palace of the Sun (금수산태양궁전) by a combined act of the North Korean cabinet and parliament, and the Workers' Party of Korea leadership. Kim Jong Un supposedly gave field guidance at the palace over 150 times in 2012 and gave personal notes over the interior and exterior renovation. These inspection efforts and renovation were categorized in a documentary "May the Sacred Temple of the Eternal Sun Shine for All Eternity"

The palace was opened in its current form with an official ceremony on 17 December 2012.

On 2 April 2013, the Supreme People's Assembly made a full amendment to the Constitution clarifying the status of the palace, and passed the Law on the Kumsusan Palace of the Sun and its corresponding SPA Ordinance. This formally declared the palace as a national landmark, defined its mission and vision, and prepared measures to maintain it for the benefit of Koreans and foreign tourists. It also outlines the duties of citizens towards this memorial edifice.

== Role in the Kim family cult of personality ==
The palace, which symbolizes the eternal presence of the two leaders, is described by North Korean sources and observers as a place of deep reverence, where they are honored in their “lifetime appearance.” Along with Mansudae Grand Monument, the Kumsusan Palace of the Sun is considered a sacred site and not as a tourist attraction to North Koreans, with people under 17 years of age not permitted to visit. The palace functions as a pilgrimage destination for North Koreans. Citizens, soldiers, and foreign visitors are brought through highly choreographed rituals of mourning and respect.

This ritualisation of political figures is a core mechanism of the cult of personality, where leaders are not just historical figures but treated as quasi‑divine presences. The palace, containing strict protocols such as bowing rituals at the bodies of the leaders, carries a religious presence to visitors, which is exemplified by its characterization as the "sacred temple of Juche" (주체의 최고성지). Violation of these norms can carry severe penalties, which strengthens the climate of reverence or fear around the Kim family.

Current leader Kim Jong Un often visits the palace to pay ritual respects on important national occasions such as the Day of the Sun and Day of the Shining Star as well as the anniversaries of the leaders deaths, sometimes with his wife Ri Sol Ju and his daughter Kim Ju Ae. He is often accompanied by members of the party, government and military.

== Interior and layout ==
The palace is opened to foreign visitors on Thursday and Sunday mornings and on national holidays, with visits taking between two and three hours. Photography, videotaping, and smoking are not permitted anywhere inside the palace. The palace gardens, though, are open all week, and are a venue for national rallies.

There are few windows on the building with the exception of one located on the top balcony on the north side. This was the window of Kim Il Sung’s office and was left as is during the 1995 renovation as to give a clear view of the Revolutionary Martyrs’ Cemetery where his first wife and mother of Kim Jong Il, Kim Jong Suk, was laid to rest. Later, Kim Jong Il's third wife and mother of Kim Jong Un, Ko Yong Hui, would also be buried in her own memorial at the cemetery. Limiting the windows on the palace was done to make the structure more secure in case of any attacks and limit light exposure of the displays within.

Visitors enter from the travelator underpass and enter the building to the Statue Hall, making their way through the Wailing Hall, before entering the Hall of Eternal Life containing the remains of Kim Il Sung and the adjoining rooms with medals and awards. Similarly, visitors then enter the lower level, where the Hall of Eternal Life containing the remains of Kim Jong Il are hosted along with the Medal Hall of accolades given to him during his life.

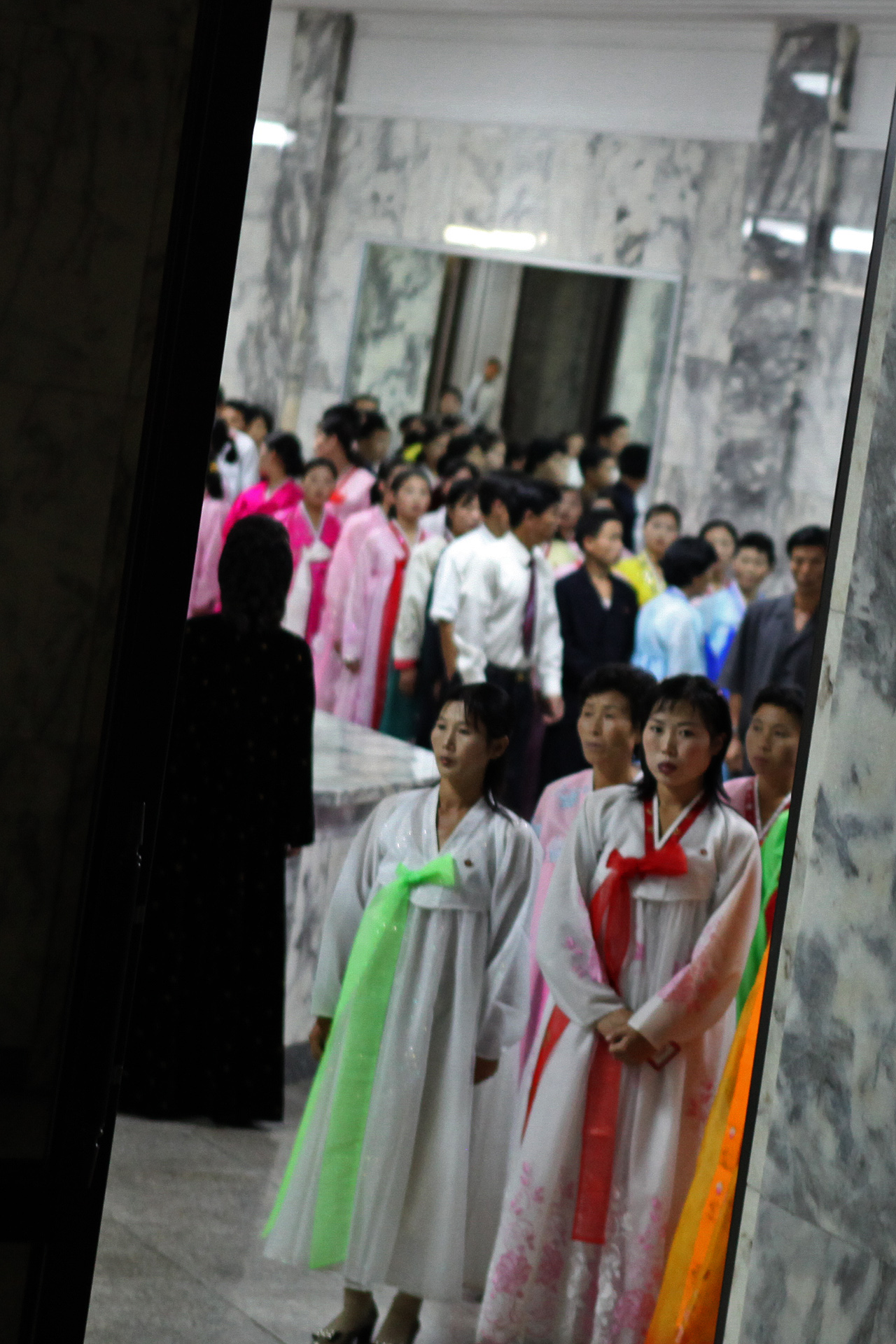
Visitors queuing in the security screening building (2010).

=== Security and access ===
The building is accessed via an underpass from security screening facilities across the road. Upon entering the checkpoint, visitors (both foreigners and North Korean tourists) have to walk over a shoe cleaning device, are asked to check all personal belongings except their wallets in a cloak room, and are given a numbered ticket to claim their belongings when leaving. Visitors proceed along a series of long travelators (moving walkways), which travel underneath the road, towards the palace.

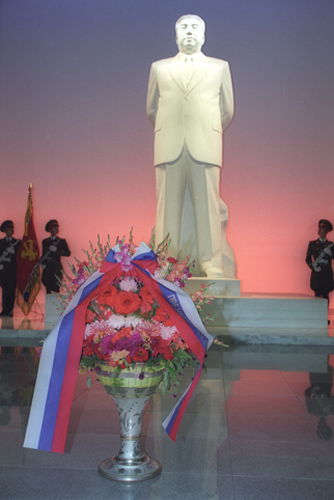
White marble statue of Kim Il Sung in the Statue Hall (2000).

=== Statue hall ===
Upon exiting the travelators, visitors appear on the eastern side of the building, and upon walking up a stairway, arrive at the doors to the Statue Hall (립상홀).

In the original 1995 refit, the hall was constructed with grey marble arched columns guiding the eye through the space towards a white marble statue of Kim Il Sung, supported by a background of soft red light. Upon its renovation in 2012, a statue of Kim Jong Il was added, along with military flags of the Korean Peoples' Army. In 2015, these were changed to a life-like wax-style statues of Kim Il Sung and Kim Jong Il, standing upon a sunrise background flanked by state and party flags. The interior of the hall has also since been changed to a warm marble color.

Visitors are instructed to stop at a yellow line on the floor and, after a few moments of contemplation, bow towards the statues of the leaders. When Kim Jong Un, party or government officials or foreign dignitaries visit the hall, its sides are flanked by the Korean Peoples' Army Honour Guard. A solemn version of the "Song of General Kim Il Sung" is played in the hall.

Another hall visit follows to the central atrium on the ground floor, where the lying in state of the two took place.

=== Wailing hall ===
In the Wailing Hall, visitors are provided with small speaker devices that play a narration detailing the Korean people’s griefs following the death of Kim Il Sung and Kim Jong Il. The room features bronze-style busts of grieving figures recalling the events of July 1994.

=== Halls of eternal life ===
Accessible by a lift, Kim Il Sung's Hall of Eternal Life (영생홀) was positioned on the topmost floor in the 1995 reconfiguration.

After passing through a dust-blowing machine, visitors enter the first hall dedicated to Kim Il Sung and then second to Kim Jong Il. There are separate halls for each leader which are similar in composition. In these rooms are where the preserved remains of the leaders are lying in state. A red rope barrier surrounds each transparent crystal sarcophagus, with visitors proceeding in groups of four. Visitors bow at the body's feet, then at the left and right sides.

Reportedly, Russian experts were brought to the mausoleum to embalm Kim Jong Il's body for permanent display in the same manner of his father and other former Communist leaders such as Vladimir Lenin, Mao Zedong and Ho Chi Minh.

=== Medal halls ===
After the Halls of Eternal Life, visitors enter the Medal Halls (메달홀) where various awards and honors bestowed upon Kim Il Sung and Kim Jong Il are housed. There are separate halls for each leader which are similar in composition to each other, with Kim Jong Il's hosted on the lower level. In Kim Il Sung's hall awards include degree certificates, only one of which is from a Western university: Kensington University in California, US, an unaccredited university.

The palace also contains exhibits of the leaders' personal vehicles, outfits, and medals and decorations, which have now been added to the expanded collection as part of a reorganization.

=== Kumsusan Palace of the Sun Square Parklands ===
After the 1995 renovation, the plaza was later reconfigued into a large stone-paved square and the central fountains that were present was removed, with Kim Jong Il remarking that "...while grand events had previously been held in Kim Il Sung Square...from now on, they could be held in this square just as they were held in honor of the Great Leader." On various occasions, military parades by the Korean People's Army were held in the plaza as well as rallies and commemorative photo sessions. As part of the wider rebuilding, a official parade grandstand and rostrum for party and state officials was added in to the facade and the driveway, also a part of the original presidential residence, later permanently removed and merged into the square.

The plaza was later made into a public parkland and was renamed the Kumsusan Palace of the Sun Square Parklands (금수산태양궁전광장공원) following the 2012 renovation, and the fountains returned, albelt in a new design instead of the old. The construction and design of the park was reportedly directed by Kim Jong Un. The park is open to visitors all week long, and features a greenhouse which covers an area of 100 hectares with over 400,000 trees of 260 different species, one feature absent from the original. Over 200 of these trees located there are rare trees sent from around the world. Parades and rallies are still held in the park on various occasions, such as the death anniversary of the leaders.

== As a meeting hall ==
The palace has served as the venue for the 3rd Conference of the Workers' Party of Korea in September 2010 and the 4th Conference of the WPK in April 2012. Both events were held in the Plenary Meeting Hall (전원회 실) wing on the west of the building.

== Around the palace ==
Not far from the palace are the Kumsusan Guest Palace (39.06123742°N 125.801766607°E) which was built in 2019 and used by Chinese leader Xi Jinping and the older Paekhwawon Guesthouse (39.046631806°N 125.81060982°E), which was used by South Korean president Moon Jae-in, U.S. secretary of state Mike Pompeo and Russian foreign minister Sergey Lavrov.

== See also ==
- Mangyongdae
- Mansu Hill Grand Monument
- Grand People's Study House
- International Friendship Exhibition
- Kimilsungia and Kimjongilia Exhibition Hall
- Revolutionary Martyrs' Cemetery
- Patriotic Martyrs' Cemetery
- Seoul National Cemetery
- Day of the Shining Star
- Day of the Sun
- Chairman Mao Memorial Hall
- Sun Yat-sen Mausoleum
- Cihu Mausoleum
- Touliao Mausoleum
- Sükhbaatar's Mausoleum
- Ho Chi Minh Mausoleum
- Ferdinand E. Marcos Presidential Center
- Lenin's Mausoleum
- Valley of the Fallen
- Georgi Dimitrov Mausoleum
- House of Flowers (mausoleum)
- Anıtkabir
- Mausoleum of Ruhollah Khomeini
- Türkmenbaşy Ruhy Mosque
- Mazar-e-Quaid
- Bourguiba mausoleum
- Kwame Nkrumah Mausoleum
- Agostinho Neto's Mausoleum
