= Juche calendar =

1997–2024 North Korean year-numbering system

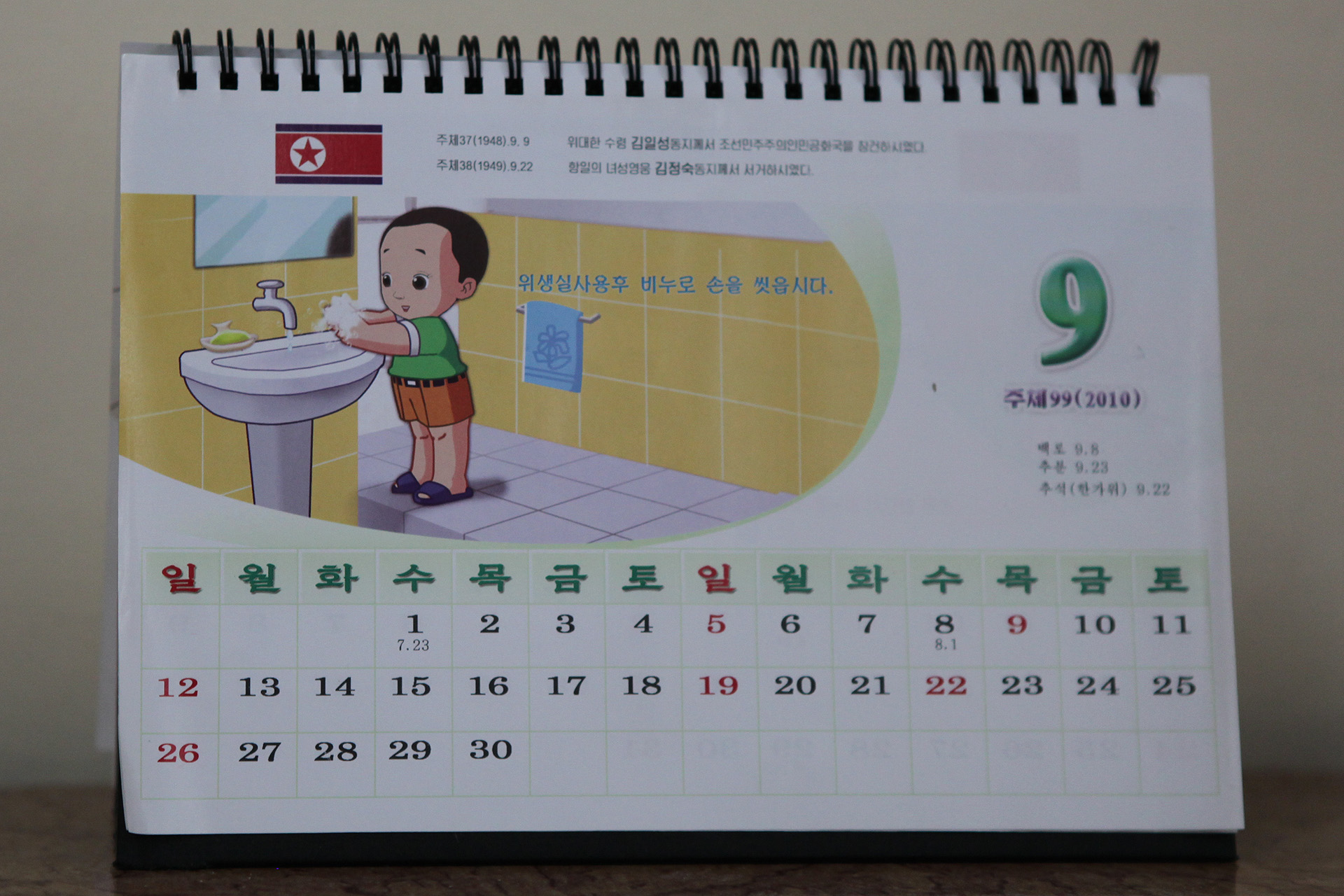
- A Juche wall calendar for Juche 99 (2010)

Korean name
- Hangul: 주체력
- Hanja: 主體曆
- RR: Jucheryeok
- MR: Chuch'eryŏk

Juche Era
- Hangul: 주체년호
- Hanja: 主體年號
- RR: Juche nyeonho
- MR: Chuch'e nyŏnho

The Juche calendar (Korean: 주체력) was the system of year-numbering used in North Korea between 1997 and 2024. Named after a key concept of North Korea's state ideology, it begins with the birth of founding father Kim Il Sung, whose birth year, 1912 in the Gregorian calendar, is Juche 1 in the Juche calendar. The calendar was adopted in 1997, three years after the death of Kim Il Sung. It has been reported that as of October 2024 the calendar is no longer in use, in favor of the Gregorian calendar.

== History ==
The calendar borrows elements from two historical calendars used in Korea, the traditional system of Korean era names and the Gregorian calendar in which years are tied to the traditional birth of Jesus. In contrast to these two, the Juche calendar begins with the birth of the founder of the Democratic People's Republic, Kim Il Sung.

The decree on the Juche calendar was adopted on 8 July 1997, on the third anniversary of the death of Kim Il Sung. The same decree also designated the birth anniversary of Kim Il Sung as the Day of the Sun. The birth year of Kim Il Sung, 1912 in the Gregorian calendar, became "Juche 1" in the Juche calendar.

The calendar began to be implemented on 9 September 1997, the Day of the Foundation of the Republic. On that date, newspapers, news agencies, radio stations, public transport, and birth certificates began to use Juche years. The Gregorian calendar was used alongside the Juche calendar until 2022.

=== Relinquishment ===
North Korea began phasing out the Juche calendar in October 2024, as Rodong Sinmun stopped using the Juche calendar in favor of the Gregorian calendar. Official calendars for the year 2025, released on 1 January, replaced what would have been Juche 114 with 2025 instead. It is believed that the Juche calendar's abandonment is intended to de-emphasize the cult of personality around the founder of North Korea, Kim Il Sung, in order to strengthen that of Kim Jong Un.

== Usage ==
The year 1912 was "Juche 1" in the Juche calendar. There were no "before Juche" years; years before 1912 were given numbers based on the Gregorian calendar only. Ranges of years that began before 1912 and end after it were also given in Christian calendar numbers only.

Any other years after 1912 would be given in either Juche years only, or in Juche years and the corresponding year in the Christian calendar in parentheses. In material pertaining to relations with foreign countries, "The Juche Era and the Christian Era [might] be used on the principles of independence, equality and reciprocity."

During the system's period of use between 1997 and 2024, the Juche calendar was a popular souvenir among tourists visiting North Korea.

== Examples ==
Juche year	Gregorian year	Dangun year	Event
1	1912	4245	Kim Il Sung's birth
8	1919	4252	March First Movement against Japanese rule
30	1941	4274	Kim Jong Il's birth (Soviet records)
31	1942	4275	Kim Jong Il's birth (North Korean records)
34	1945	4278	Liberation of Korea from Japanese rule
37	1948	4281	Establishment of North Korea
39–42	1950–1953	4283–4286	Korean War
71	1982	4315	Kim Jong Un's birth (North Korean records)
72	1983	4316	Kim Jong Un's birth (South Korean and U.S. records)
83	1994	4327	Kim Il Sung's death
83–87	1994–1998	4327–4331	North Korean famine (Arduous March)
86	1997	4330	Introduction of the Juche calendar
100	2011	4344	Kim Jong Il's death
113	2024	4357	Abolition of the Juche calendar
115	2026	4359	Current year

== See also ==
- Public holidays in North Korea
- Republic of China calendar
