= Korean Children's Union =

North Korean political youth organization

- Emblem of Korean Children's Union, with the motto "Always prepared!" (항상 준비!)

- Flag of the Korean Children's Union
- Founded: 6 June 1946; 80 years ago
- Headquarters: Pyongyang, North Korea
- Ideology: Communism; Socialism; Kimilsungism–Kimjongilism; Juche; North Korean nationalism
- Mother party: Workers' Party of Korea

- Korean Children's Union
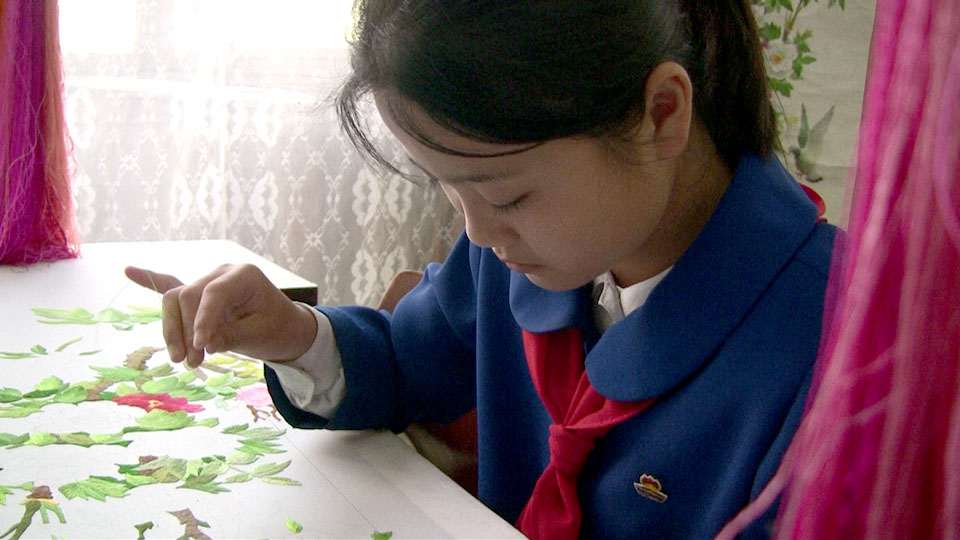
- A member of the Korean Children's Union at Mangyongdae Children's Palace

Korean name
- Hangul: 조선소년단
- Hanja: 朝鮮少年團
- RR: Joseon sonyeondan
- MR: Chosŏn sonyŏndan

The Korean Children's Union (KCU; Korean: 조선소년단) is a North Korean organization to which all North Korean children aged seven to fourteen belong. A pioneer movement, it is a political organization linked to the Workers' Party of Korea. Its uniformed branch, which admits children ages 9 through fifteen, is known as the Young Pioneer Corps.

== Organization ==
The organization operates chapters in elementary and secondary schools nationwide. It teaches children about Juche and other aspects of the state ideology. It is a precursor to the Socialist Patriotic Youth League. Its officers play a role similar to that of student body leaders in South Korean schools, but with a military-style rank structure. Among its activities are raising funds for weapons: in 2023 it donated rocket launcher vehicles to the armed forces.

Prospective members are usually welcomed formally on an important public holiday such as the Day of the Sun, the Military Foundation Day, or the Day of the Foundation of the Republic. It is considered an important occasion in a child's life. On such days, kindergarten-grade children are officially admitted and red neckerchiefs and pins handed out. Third graders from primary schools are usually welcomed into the Young Pioneers branch of the KCU in investiture ceremonies on the same days. They wear the neckerchief with their uniform in formal events of their organization.

== See also ==
- Socialist Patriotic Youth League
- Ernst Thälmann Pioneer Organisation
- Vladimir Lenin All-Union Pioneer Organization
