= Kang Nung-su =

North Korean politician (1930–2015)

Vice Premier of North Korea
- In office June 2010 – July 2015
- Premier: Pak Pong-ju; Choe Yong-rim

Minister of Culture of the Democratic People's Republic of Korea
- In office September 1999 – September 2003
- In office June 2006 – January 2010

Personal details
- Born: February 21, 1930 Pyongyang, Korea, Empire of Japan
- Died: July 21, 2015 (aged 85)
- Education: Kim Il Sung University, Korean Literature Dept.
- Occupation: literary critic, politician, vice-premier, member of WPK Central Committee, delegate to 12th Supreme People's Assembly

Korean name
- Hangul: 강능수
- Hanja: 姜能洙
- RR: Gang Neungsu
- MR: Kang Nŭngsu

Kang Nung-su (Korean: 강능수; February 21, 1930 – July 21, 2015) was a North Korean literary critic and politician. He was a vice premier and member of the politburo of the Central Committee of the Workers' Party of Korea. He was a delegate to the 12th and 13th sessions of the Supreme People's Assembly.

== Career ==
Kang was born in 1930 in Pyongyang, Korea, Empire of Japan. He graduated from the Korean literature department of Kim Il Sung University. In March 1973, he became head of the authors' delegation as deputy chair of the central committee of the Korean Writers' Union, and visited the USSR. In February 1986, he became a vice-president of the Korea Literary Production Company, and in 1989 he became president of the April 15th Literature League and vice-chairman of the Reunification Literature Department of the Korean Writers' Union.

From September 1999 to September 2003, he served as Minister of Culture in the Cabinet of North Korea, and in August 2000 he became chair of the Korea Public Information Committee. In February 2004, he served as chair of the Kimilsungia-Kimjongilia Committee, and in March 2006, he served as deputy chair of the North Korean committee for implementation of the June 15th North–South Joint Declaration.

In June 2006, he was again appointed Minister of Culture, and was retained in this position in April 2009 and through January 2010. In February 2010, he served as head of the Film Department of the WPK Central Committee, and as chair of the National Film Committee. In June 2010 he was appointed vice premier of the North Korean cabinet.

In September 2010, he was appointed a member of the Central Committee of the Workers' Party of Korea.

Kang served as a member of the national mourning committees for Ri In Mo in 2007, Kim Jung-rin in 2010, and Kim Jong Il in 2011.

== Delegate to Supreme People's Assembly ==
In September 2003, Kang became a delegate to the 11th session of the Supreme People's Assembly (SPA), and he served until April 2008 as vice-chair of the SPA. In April 2009, he became a delegate to the 12th SPA.

== Awards ==
In August 1997, he received the Order of Kim Il Sung.

== Works ==
- 문학의 기초 (1966)
- 시대와 문학 (1991)

Preceded by Choi Chae-hyon	Minister of Culture of the Cabinet of North Korea; September 1999 –September 2003	Succeeded by Choi Ik-kyu
Preceded by Kim Chin-song	Minister of Culture of the Cabinet of North Korea; June 2006 –January 2010	Succeeded by Ahn Tong-chun
Preceded by	Deputy Premier of the Cabinet of North Korea; June 2010 –	Succeeded by Current
