= North Korean cult of personality =

Veneration of the ruling Kim family in North Korea

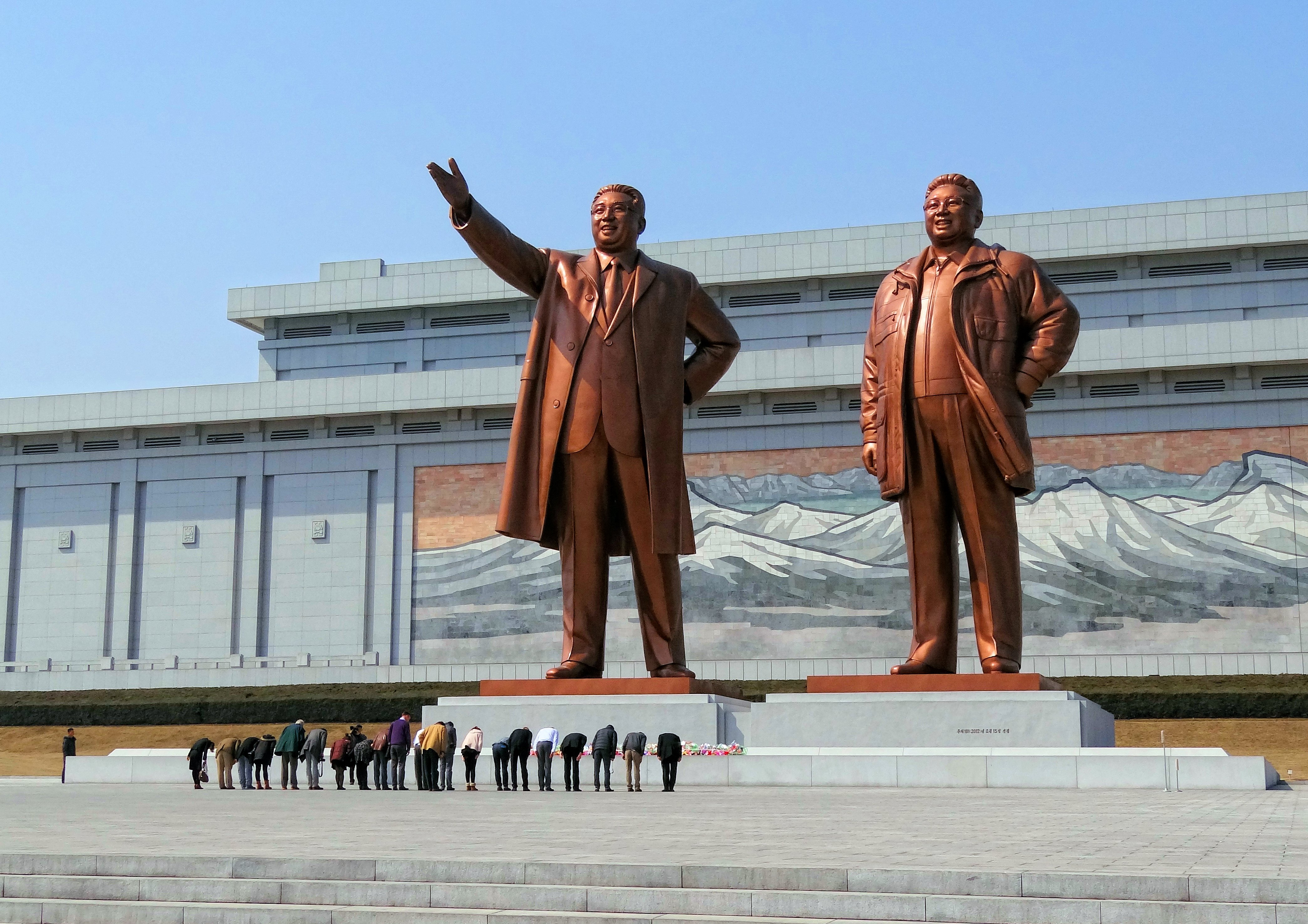
The Mansudae Grand Monument in Pyongyang in 2014 depicting Kim Il Sung (left) and Kim Jong Il (right), with visitors paying homage to the statues

The cult of personality surrounding the Kim family has existed in North Korea for decades and can be found in many examples of North Korean culture. Although not acknowledged by the North Korean government, many defectors and Western visitors state there are often stiff penalties for those who criticize or do not show "proper" respect for the former leaders of the country, Kim Il Sung and Kim Jong Il, officially referred to as "eternal leaders of Korea". The personality cult began soon after Kim Il Sung took power in 1948, and was greatly expanded after his death in 1994.

While other countries have had cults of personality to various degrees, the pervasiveness and extreme nature of North Korea's personality cult surpasses that of both its original influences, Joseph Stalin and Mao Zedong. The cult is also marked by the intensity of the people's feelings for and devotion to their leaders, and the key role played by a Confucianized ideology of familism both in maintaining the cult and thereby in sustaining the regime itself. The North Korean cult of personality is a large part of Juche, the official ideology of the country. It is considered to be the world's only active imperial cult.

== Background ==
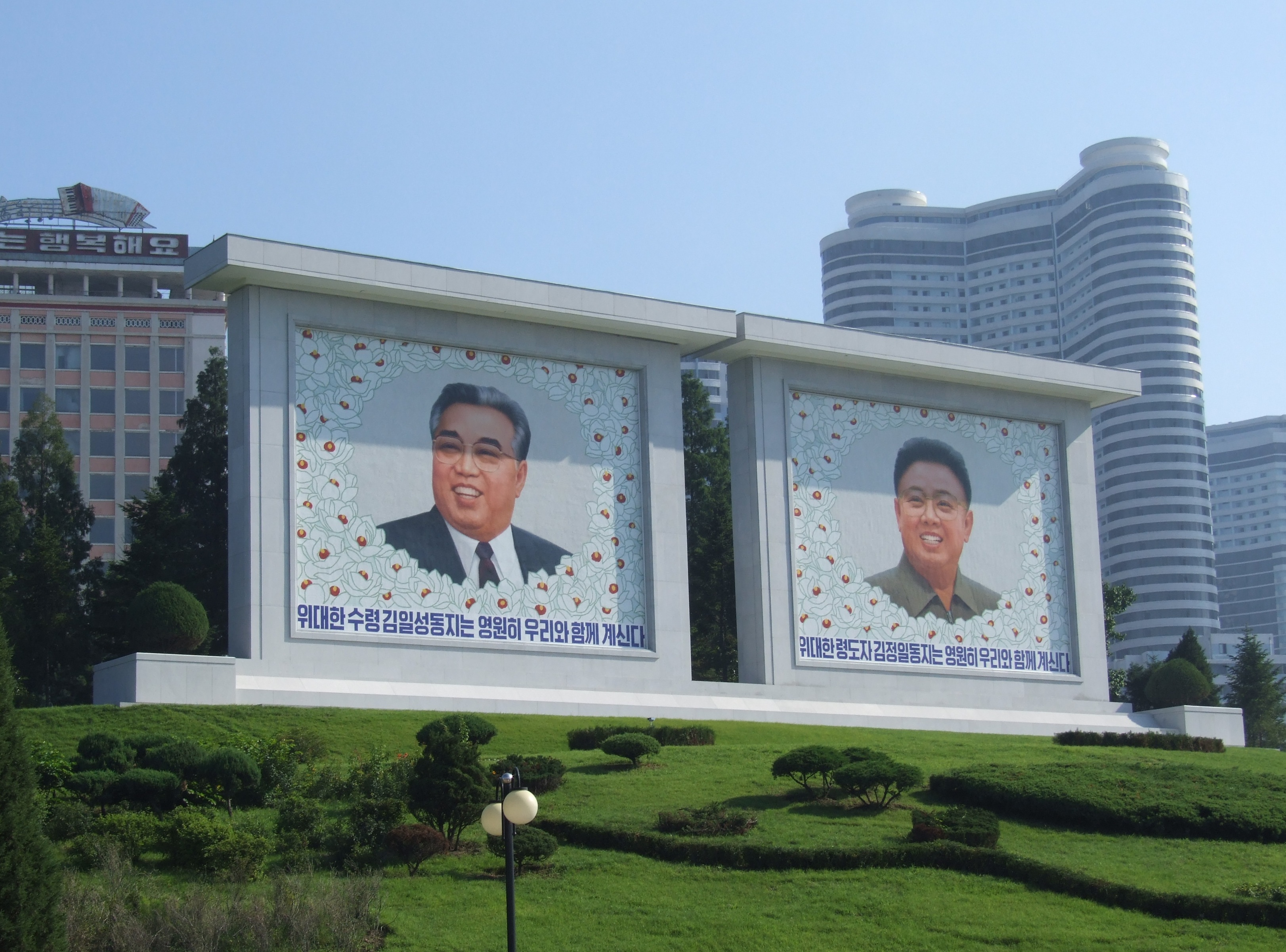
Murals of Kim Il Sung and Kim Jong Il at Jangdae hill in Pyongyang

The cult of personality around the Kim family has a deeply prominent place in North Korean culture. According to Suh Dae-sook, the cult of personality surrounding the Kim family requires total loyalty and subjugation to the Kim family and establishes the country as a one-man dictatorship through successive generations. The 1972 constitution of North Korea incorporates the ideas of Kim Il Sung as the only guiding principle of the state and his activities as the only cultural heritage of the people. According to New Focus International, the cult of personality, particularly surrounding Kim Il Sung, has been crucial for legitimizing the family's hereditary succession, and Park Yong-soo said in the Australian Journal of International Affairs that the "prestige of the Suryong [Great Leader] has been given the highest priority over everything else in North Korea". There are often stiff penalties for those who criticize or do not show "proper" respect for Kim Il Sung and Kim Jong Il, The pervasiveness and extreme nature of North Korea's personality cult surpasses that of both its original influences, Joseph Stalin and Mao Zedong.

Kim Il Sung developed the political ideology of the Juche idea, generally understood as self-reliance, and furthered it between the 1950s and the 1970s. Juche became the main guide of all forms of thought, education, culture and life throughout the nation until Kim Jong Il introduced the Songun (military-first) policy in 1995, which augments the Juche philosophy and has a great impact on national economic policies.

At the 4th Party Conference held in April 2012, Kim Jong Un further defined Juche as the comprehensive thought of Kim Il Sung, developed and deepened by Kim Jong Il, therefore terming it as "Kimilsungism-Kimjongilism" and that it was "the only guiding idea of the party" and nation.

According to a 2013 report by New Focus International, the two major North Korean news publications (Rodong Sinmun and the Korean Central News Agency) publish around 300 articles per month relating to the "cult of Kim". The report further suggests that with the death of Kim Jong Il, the average North Korean citizen is growing weary of the vast amount of propaganda surrounding the Kims. Daily NK likewise published in 2015 that the younger generation is more interested in the outside world and that the government is finding it difficult to secure the loyalty of the "jangmadang" (marketplace) generation and promoting the idolization of Kim Jong Un.

The North Korean government claims there is no cult of personality, but rather genuine support not only for their nation's leadership but also the philosophy of Juche socialism.

== Kim Il Sung (1948–1994) ==
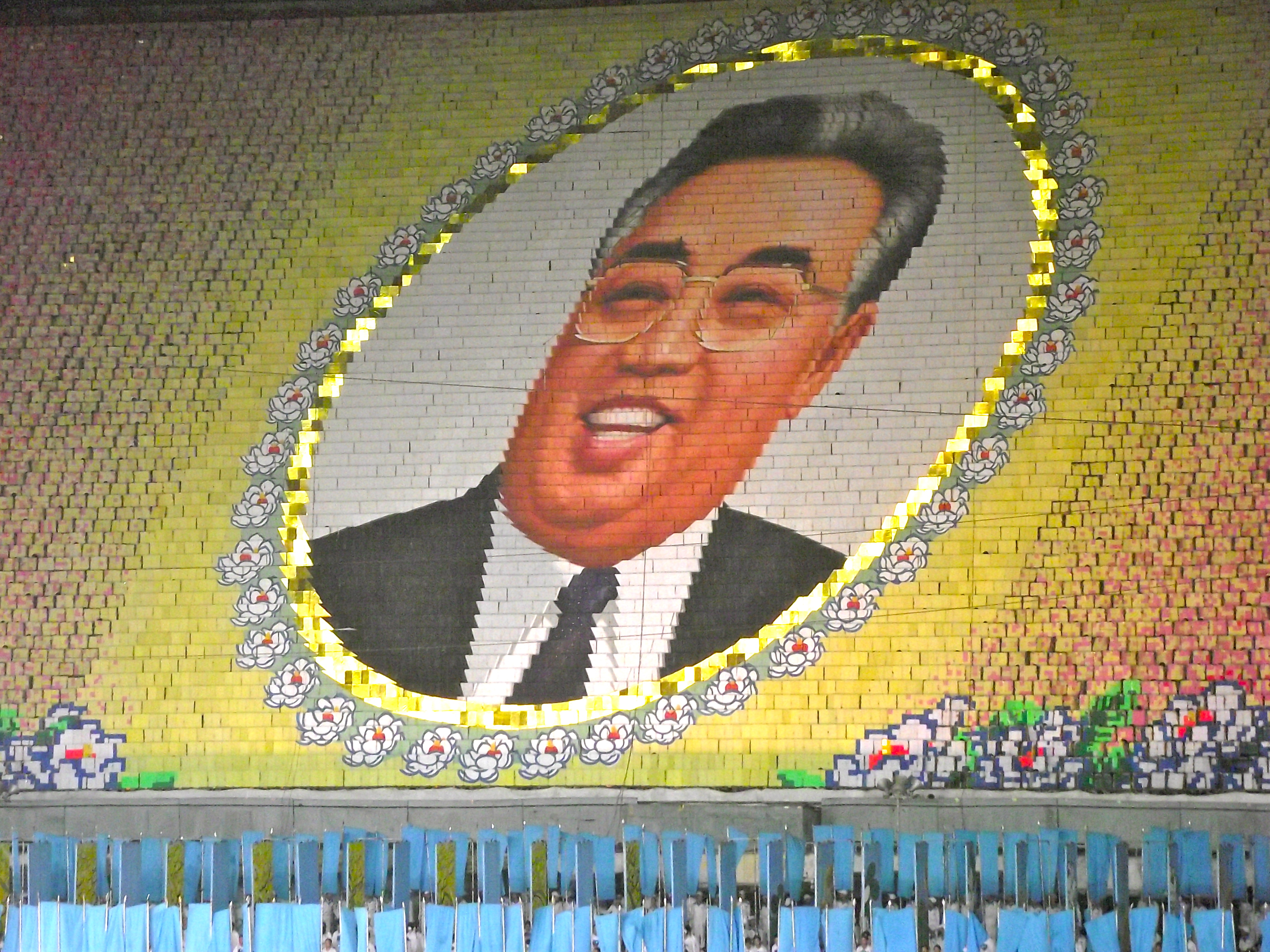
Image shown during an Arirang Festival

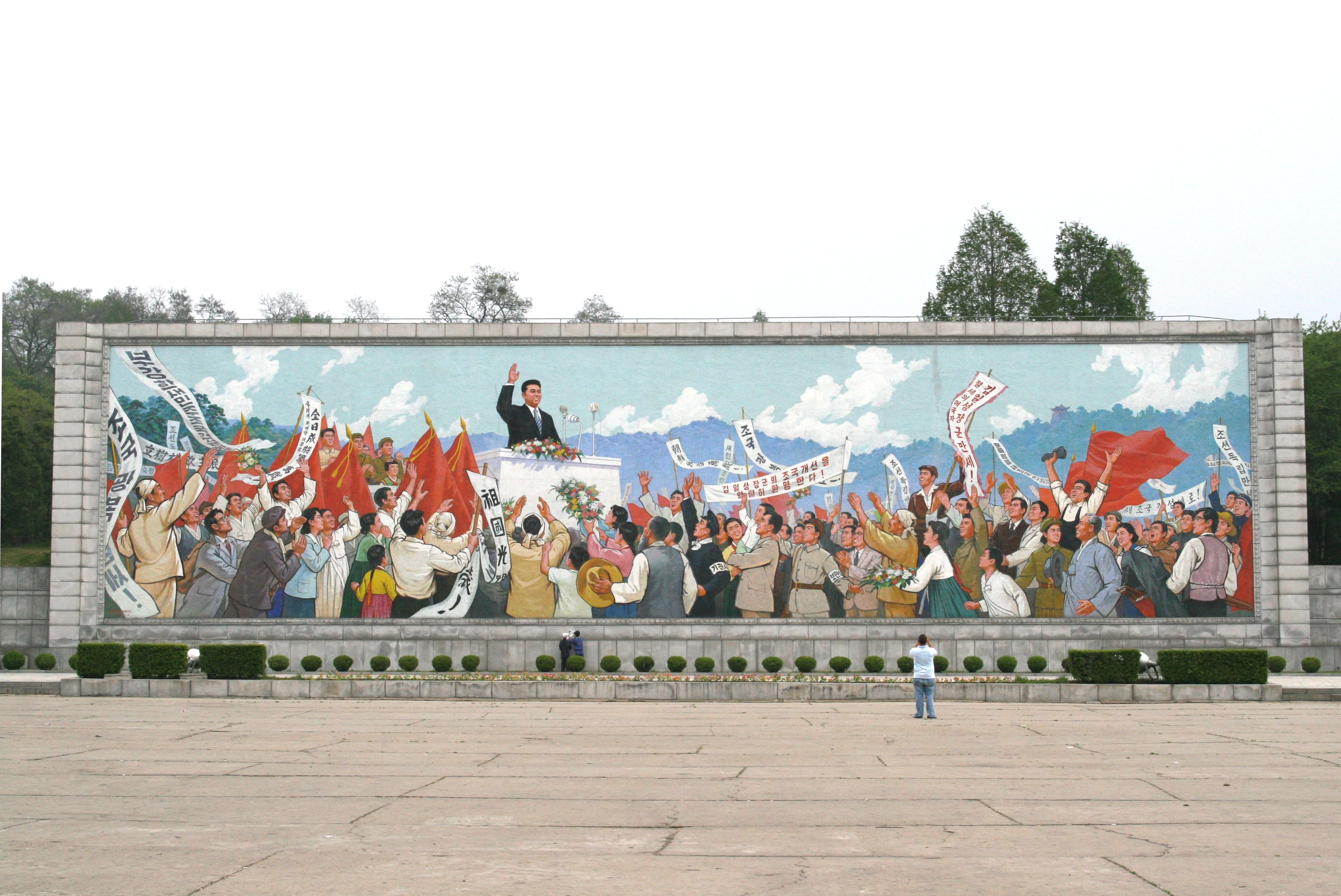
A mural of Kim Il Sung giving a speech in Pyongyang

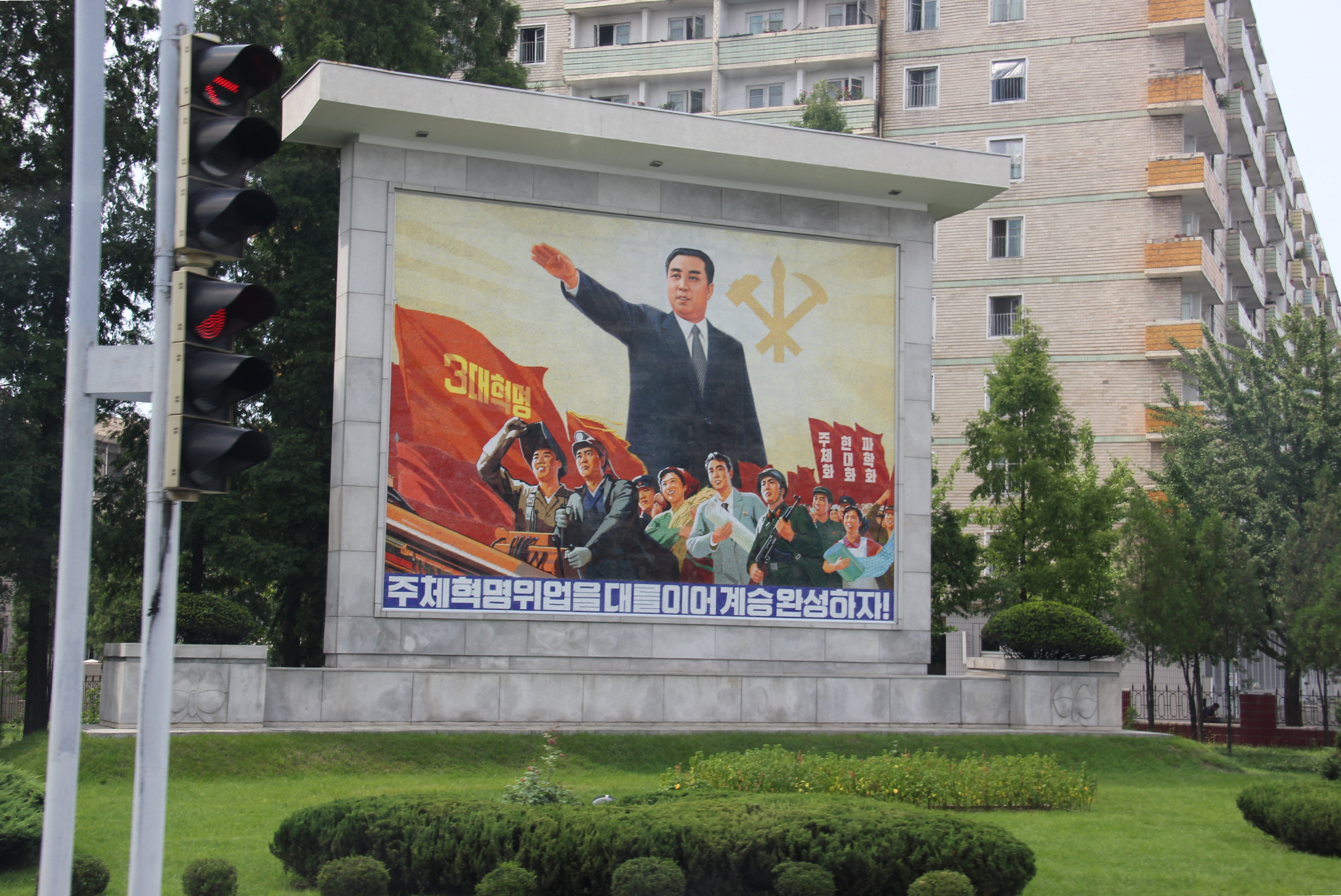
A mural with an idealised image of Kim Il Sung in Pyongyang and the hammer, brush and sickle (the symbol of the Workers' Party of Korea)

The personality cult surrounding Kim Il Sung is by far the most widespread among the people. While there is genuine affection for Kim Il Sung, it has been manipulated by the government for political purposes.

The history of the North Korean government's establishment of a personality cult of Kim Il Sung can be traced back to the time when the first statue of him was erected in North Korea in 1949. Initially, there were reformists within the Workers' Party of Korea who opposed the establishment of a personality cult of Kim Il Sung, but after Kim Il Sung was awarded the title of "Marshal of the Democratic People's Republic of Korea" in 1953 and the subsequent purges, including the August faction incident, removed political opponents, the veneration of Kim Il Sung came into full effect. In 1967, Kim Jong Il was appointed to the state propaganda and information department, where he began to focus his energy on developing the veneration of his father. It was around this time that the title Widaehan Suryong ('Great Leader') came into habitual usage. However, Kim Il Sung had begun calling himself "Great Leader" as early as 1949.

Hwang Jang-yop, the second highest level North Korean defector, has said that the country is completely ruled by the sole ideology of the "Great Leader". He further said that during the de-Stalinization period in the USSR, when Stalin's cult of personality was dismantled in 1956, some North Korean students studying in the Soviet Union also began to criticize Kim Il Sung's growing personality cult and when they returned home they "were subject to intensive interrogation that lasted for months" and "Those found the least bit suspicious were killed in secret".

According to official biographies, Kim Il Sung came from a long lineage of leaders and official North Korean modern history focuses on his life and activities. He is credited with almost single-handedly defeating the Japanese at the end of the occupation of Korea (ignoring Soviet and American efforts) and with rebuilding the nation after the Korean War. Over the course of his life he was granted titles of esteem such as "Sun", "Great Chairman", "Heavenly Leader" and many others, as well as awards like the "Double Hero Gold Medal". These titles and awards were often self-given and the practice would be repeated by his son. The Korean Central News Agency (the official government news agency) continually reported on the titles and perceived affection granted to Kim Il Sung by world leaders including Mao Zedong of China, Fidel Castro of Cuba and Jimmy Carter of the United States.

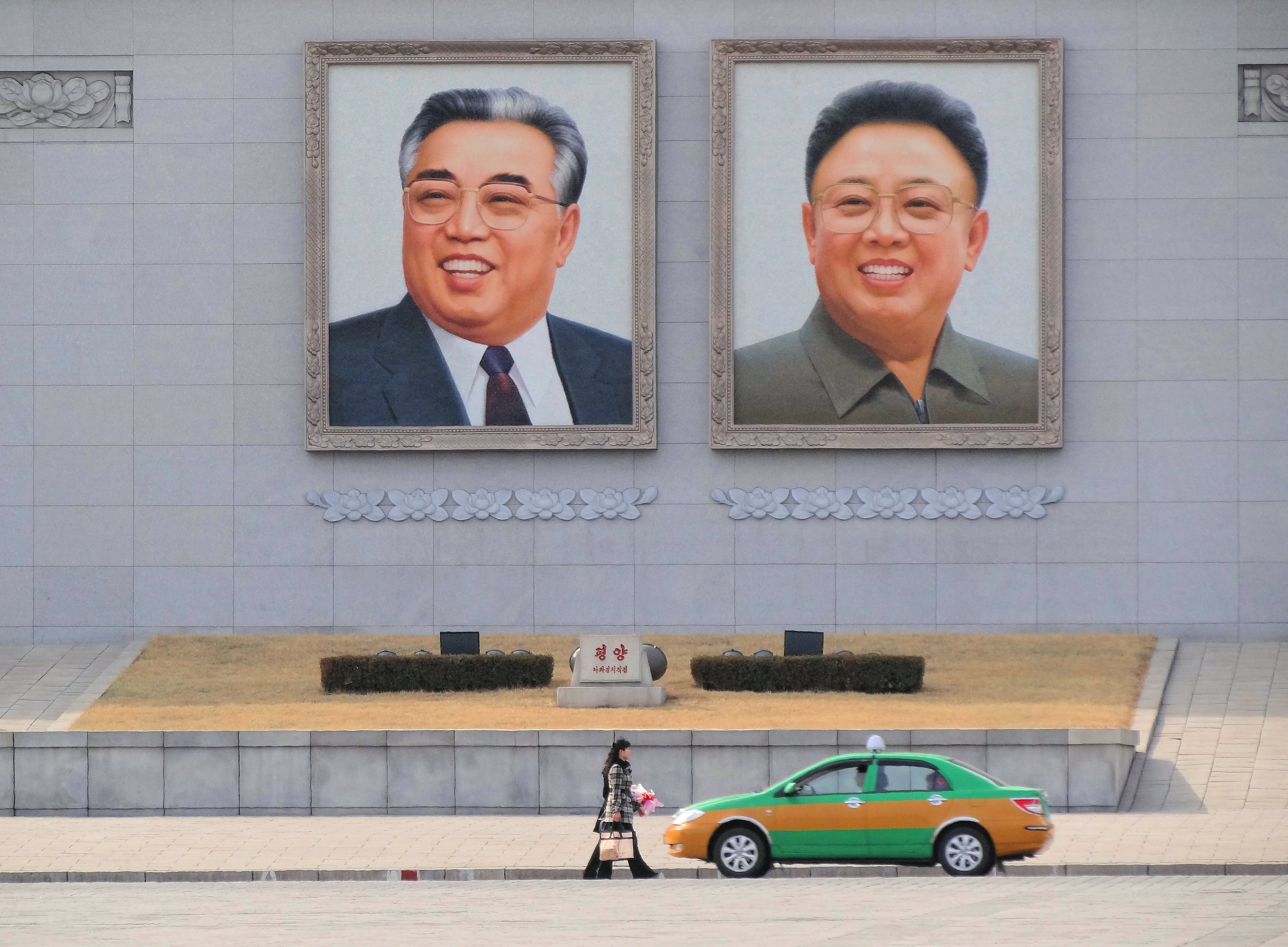
Large portraits on the wall of the Grand People's Study House, facing Kim Il Sung Square in Pyongyang, North Korea

All major publications (newspapers, textbooks etc.) were to include "words of instruction" from Kim Il Sung. Additionally, his name must be written as a single word in one line, it may not be split into two parts if there is a page break or the line of text runs out of room (for example: Kim Il Sung, not Kim Il...Sung).

North Korean children were taught in school that they were fed, clothed and nurtured in all aspects by the "grace of the Chairman". The larger elementary schools in the country have a room set aside for lectures that deal specifically with Kim Il Sung (known as the Kim Il Sung Research Institute). These rooms are well taken care of, are built of high quality materials, and have a model of his birthplace in Mangyongdae. The size of the images of him which adorned public buildings are regulated to be in proportion to the size of the building on which they hang. His place of birth has also become a place of pilgrimage.

Kang Chol-hwan wrote of his childhood in North Korea:

To my childish eyes and to those of all my friends, Kim Il-sung and Kim Jong-il were perfect beings, untarnished by any base human function. I was convinced, as we all were, that neither of them urinated or defecated. Who could imagine such things of gods?

In his memoir With the Century, Kim Il Sung tells an anecdote involving his father and grandfather that gives the rationale for this sanitized presentation of North Korean leaders to their followers. The memoir says that as a young pupil, Kim Il Sung's father was often sent to fetch wine for one of his teachers, who drank frequently, until one day his father saw the drunken teacher fall face-first into a ditch. This led to a confrontation in which the young pupil shamed the embarrassed teacher into giving up wine altogether. Kim Il Sung's grandfather draws the moral of this story:

My grandfather's opinion was this: If pupils peep into their teacher's private life frequently, they lose their awe of him; the teacher must give his pupils the firm belief that their teacher neither eats nor urinates; only then can he maintain his authority at school; so a teacher should set up a screen and live behind it.

Biographer Suh Dae-sook notes:

The magnitude of adulation often borders on fanaticism. His photograph is displayed ahead of the national flag and national emblem; the song of Marshal Kim Il Sung is played ahead of the national anthem; the best institution of higher learning is named after him; the highest party school is also named after him; and there are songs, poems, essays, stories, and even a flower named after him.

Former Albanian dictator Enver Hoxha remarked on North Korea:

"In Pyongyang, I believe that even Tito will be astonished at the proportions of the cult of his host, which has reached a level unheard of anywhere else, either in past or present times, let alone in a country which calls itself socialist."

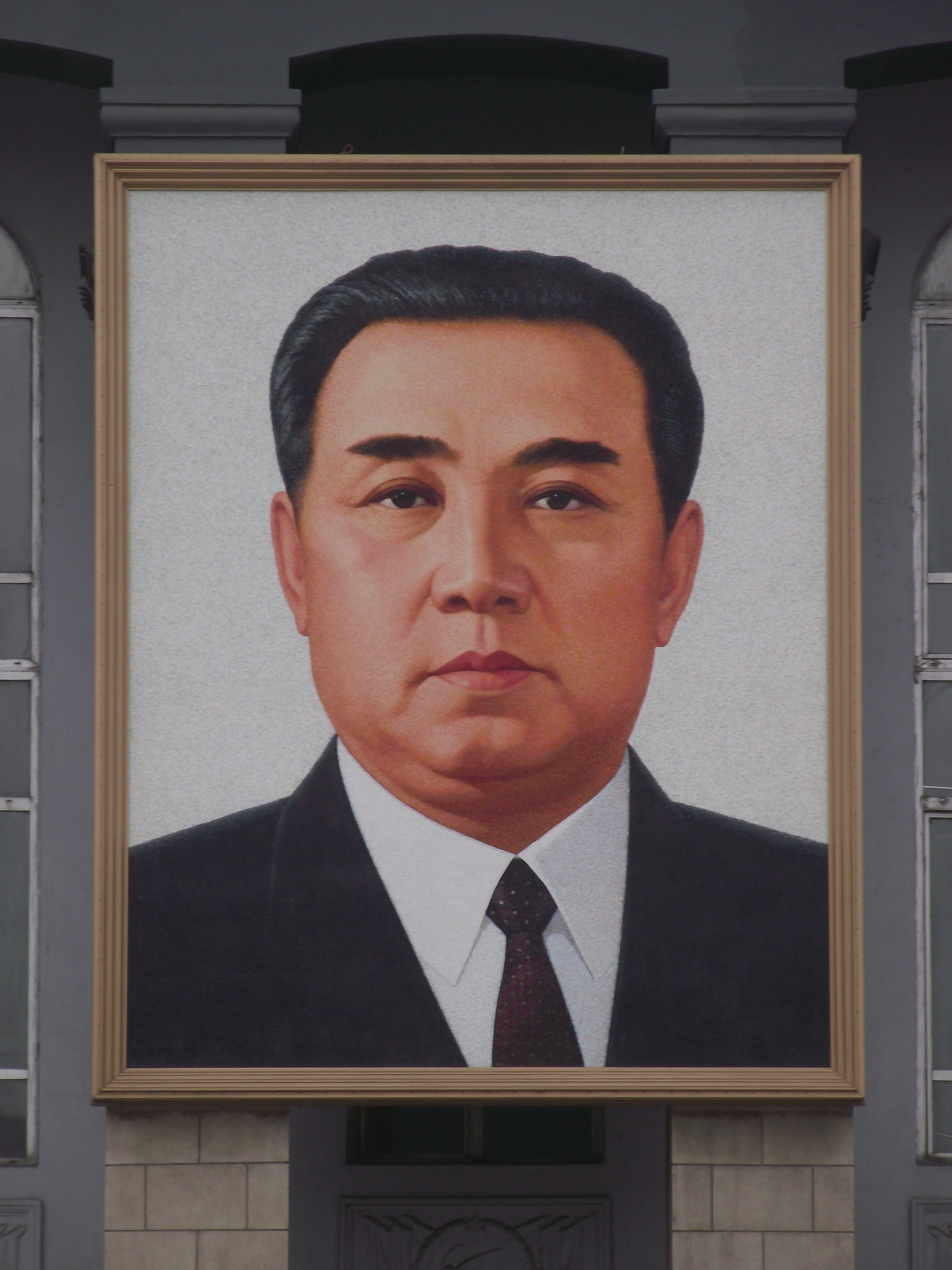
The official portrait of President Kim Il Sung as put on the Kim Il Sung Square main ministerial building

The Kimilsungia is an orchid named after Kim Il Sung by Indonesian former president Sukarno. It was named after him in 1965 during a visit to the Bogor Botanical Gardens. According to a 2005 speech by Kim Jong Il, Sukarno and the garden's director wanted to name the flower after Kim Il Sung. Kim Il Sung declined, yet Sukarno insisted, "No. You have rendered enormous services to mankind, so you deserve a high honour." Domestically, the flowers (and the Kimjongilia, described below) are used in idolizing the leadership.

When Kim Il Sung died in 1994, Kim Jong Il declared a national mourning period for three years. Those who were found violating the mourning rules (such as drinking) were met with punishment. During the 10-day national mourning period, women were not allowed to wear makeup or style their hair, drinking, dancing, and musical activities were prohibited, and all North Koreans were required to pay their respects at the statue of Kim Il Sung. After his death he was referred to as the "Eternal President". In 1998 the national constitution was changed to reflect this. When his father died, Kim Jong Il greatly expanded the nation's cult of personality. In 1997, the Juche Era dating system, which begins with the birth of Kim Il Sung (April 15, 1912) as year 1, was introduced and replaced the Gregorian calendar. However, it is no longer in use as of 2024.

July 8, 2014 marked the 20th anniversary of Kim Il Sung's death. North Korean authorities declared a ten-day mourning period which ran from July 1 to July 10. The anniversary involved lectures, study sessions, local choirs, etc., with children and workers being mobilized to take part in the various events. According to a resident of Hyesan, "Nowadays people are having a hard time... as events related to the passing of the Suryeong are going on every single day in the Democratic Women's Union and workplaces alike". Nevertheless, the resident said, "Nobody is complaining about it, maybe because ever since the purge of Jang Song-thaek last year, if you picked a fight they'd just drag you away".

== Kim Jong Il (1994–2011) ==
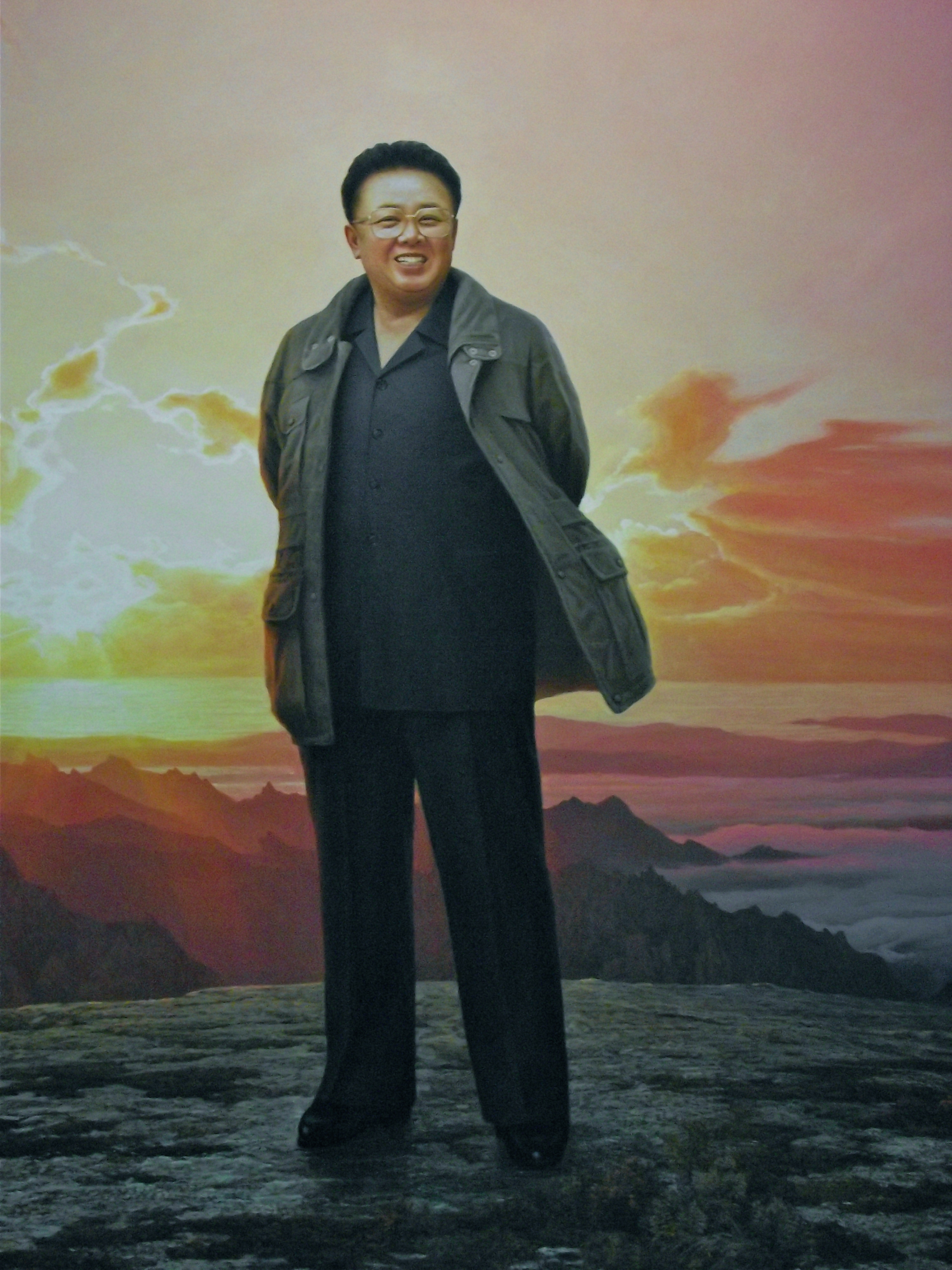
A painting of Kim Jong Il at Mount Paektu, his alleged birthplace

In keeping with the modern mythologies that pervade North Korea's version of history, which is seen as crucial to the cult of personality and political control, it is alleged that Kim Jong Il was born on Mount Paektu at his father's secret base in 1942 (his actual birth was in 1941 in the Soviet Union) and that his birth was heralded by a swallow, caused winter to change to spring, a star to illuminate the sky, and a double rainbow to appear. These claims, like those surrounding his father, continued throughout his life.

Starting in the early 1970s Kim Il Sung began to contemplate the succession question, albeit surreptitiously at first, but by 1975 Kim Jong Il was referred to as the "party center", or in connection with his father with references to "our great suryong and the party center". In 1977, the first confirmation of Kim Jong Il's succession by name was published in a booklet which designated the younger Kim as the only heir to Kim Il Sung, that he was a loyal servant of his father and had inherited his father's virtues, and that all party members were to pledge their loyalty to Kim Jong Il. They were also urged to support his absolute authority and to obey him unconditionally.

Prior to 1996, Kim Jong Il forbade the erection of statues of himself and discouraged portraits. However, in 1996, schools were required to build a separate room for lectures dealing specifically with Kim Jong Il known as the Kim Jong Il Research Institute. They include a model of his birthplace. There are approximately 40,000 "research institutes" (total includes both Kim Il Sung and Kim Jong Il's) throughout the country.

Between 1973 and 2012, Kim Jong Il accumulated no fewer than 54 titles, most of which had little or nothing at all to do with real political or military accomplishments since he never had any military training. His most common title was "Dear Leader."

Over the course of his life, the government issued numerous propaganda reports of the great accomplishments achieved by Kim Jong Il, such as that he could walk and talk before the age of six months. The North Korean newspaper, Rodong Sinmun, reported that an "unidentified French fashion expert" said of Kim's fashion, "Kim Jong Il mode, which is now spreading expeditiously worldwide, is something unprecedented in the world's history." The Korean Central News Agency has also reported, among other things, that according to eyewitness accounts "nature and the sky unfolded such mysterious ecstasy in celebration of the birthday of Kim Jong Il."

To commemorate Kim Jong Il's 46th birthday, Japanese botanist Kamo Mototeru cultivated a new perennial begonia named "Kimjongilia" (literally, "flower of Kim Jong Il").

=== After Kim Jong Il's death ===
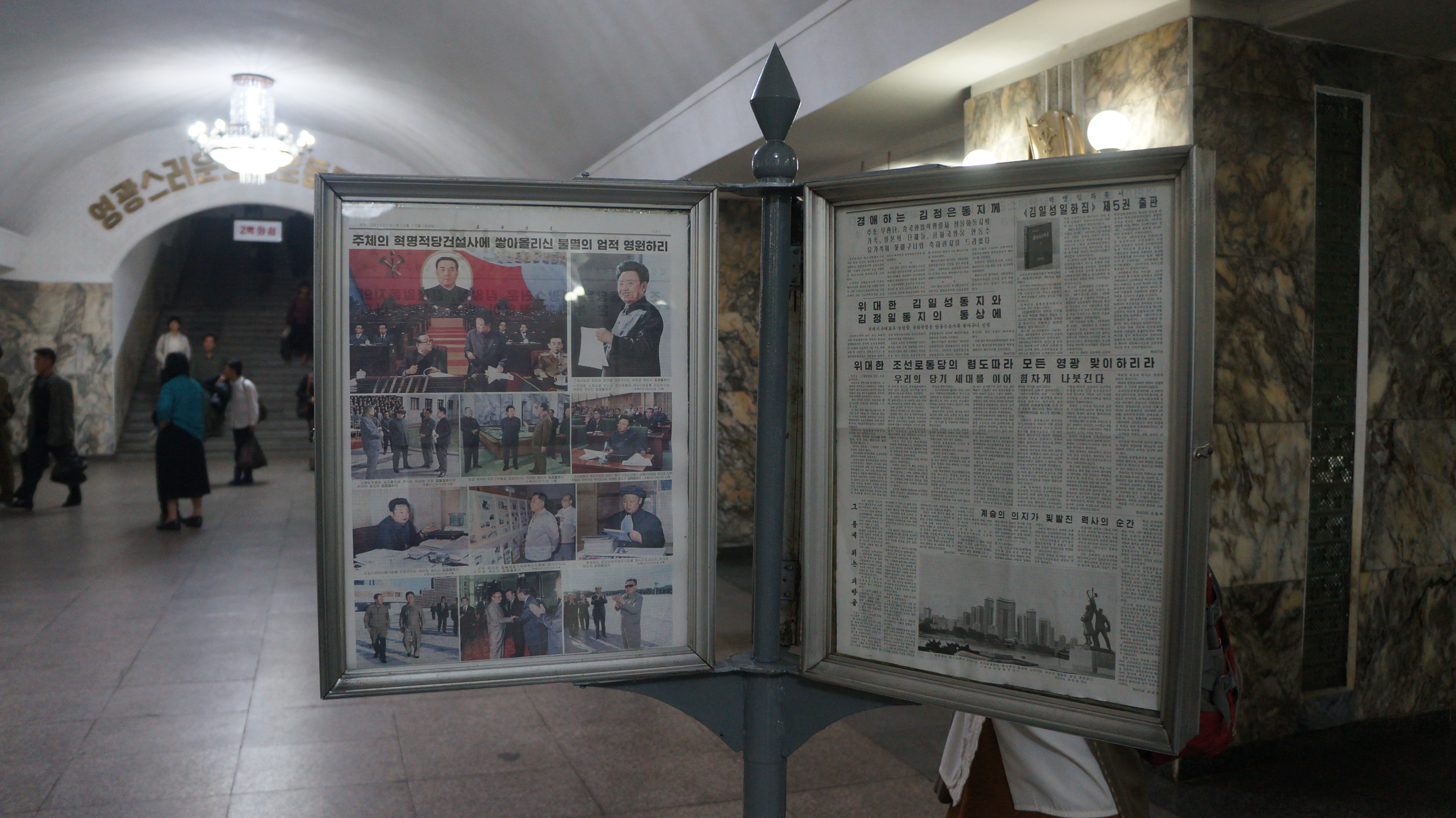
Rodong Sinmun carrying articles on Kim Jong Il's revolutionary exploits

After his death on December 17, 2011, the Korean Central News Agency (KCNA) said that layers of ice ruptured with an unprecedentedly loud crack at Chon Lake on Mount Paektu and a snowstorm with strong winds hit the area. A political paper by his son, Kim Jong Un, sought to solidify his father as the "Eternal General Secretary of our Party." Many had been seen weeping during the 100-day mourning period, which is typical of Korean Confucian society, and an analyst at South Korea's Korea Institute for National Unification determined that much of the public grief evidenced during the mourning period was a genuine expression of sorrow. Yet, a journalist from the West questioned the sincerity of the displays of grief.

Similar to the mourning period of Kim Il Sung, individuals who did not follow the 100-day mourning period regulations or were thought to be insincere in their grief were subject to punishment and in some cases may have been executed. A notable example of this was the alleged death of Kim Chol and other high-ranking officials. However, in the case of Chol, doubts have been raised as to the credibility of the original account with Foreign Policy stating that stories about violent deaths of North Korean elites tend to be "exaggerated" and observing the version of events disseminated by South Korean media was likely based on "gossip".

Several large-scale bronze statues have been erected alongside statues of Kim Il Sung. They include a 5.7-meter (19-foot) statue of Kim Jong Il and Kim Il Sung each riding a horse (the first large monument built after Kim Jong Il's death) and a 23-meter (75-foot) tall statue at Mansudae, Pyongyang. The government has also been replacing statues of Kim Il Sung with updated versions along with new statues of Kim Jong Il beside the ones of his father in each of the provincial capitals and other sites.

Following his death, numerous commemorative stamps and coins were made and slogans have been carved on the sides of mountains in honor of his 70th birthday anniversary.

== Kim Jong Un (2011–present) ==
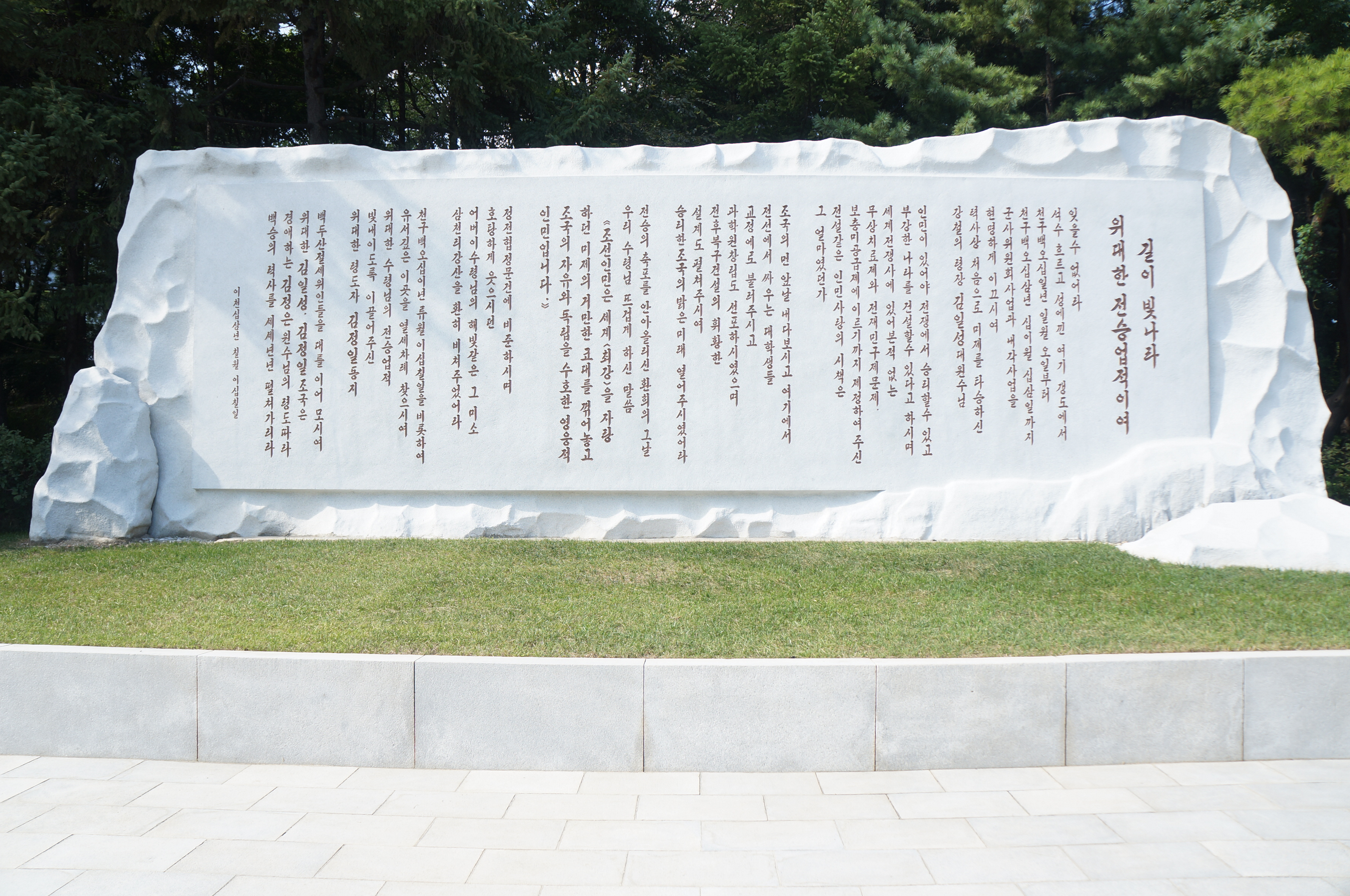
An inscription with names of all three leaders

Kim Jong Un, the grandson of North Korea's founder, was largely absent from the public and government service until the mid-2000s. In 2010 he began being referred to as the "Young General" and by late 2011 as "Respected General". Like his father, he lacks any formal military training or service. With the death of his father, state media began to refer to him as the "Great Successor." He is also called "Dear Respected" or "Supreme Leader." When he was still a new ruler, the development of his own personality cult was well underway, with large numbers of posters, signs, and other propaganda being placed all over the country. A journalist from Japan's The Asahi Shimbun said that his striking likeness in appearance to Kim Il Sung has helped solidify him as the undisputed ruler in the minds of the people. Kim Jong Un marks the third generation of Kim family dynastic leadership. According to Daily NK, people who criticized the succession were sent to re-education camps or otherwise punished and, after the mourning period of Kim Jong Il, government authorities began to increase their efforts on building the idolization of Kim Jong Un.

After Kim Jong Il's death the president of the Presidium announced that "Respected Comrade Kim Jong Un is our party, military and country's supreme leader who inherits great comrade Kim Jong Il's ideology, leadership, character, virtues, grit and courage." Shortly after the new leader came to power, a 560-meter (1,840 ft)-long propaganda sign was erected in his honor near a lake in Ryanggang Province. The sign, supposedly visible from space, reads "Long Live General Kim Jong Un, the Shining Sun!" In 2013, the Workers' Party of Korea amended the Ten Principles for the Establishment of a Monolithic Ideological System, which in practice serves as the primary legal authority and framework of the country, to demand "absolute obedience" to Kim Jong Un.

Kim Jong Un's uncle-in-law, Jang Sung-taek, was executed on December 12, 2013. His death was attributed, in part, to undermining the Kim family personality cult. His death has also been seen as a move by Kim Jong Un to consolidate his own cult. In 2015, at the end of the formal three-year mourning period for the death of Kim Jong Il, Kim Jong Un ordered the construction of new monuments to be built in every county of North Korea. Extensive renovations to the Kumsusan Memorial Palace have also been ordered. According to The Daily Telegraph, analysts "say the order to erect more statues to the Kim family will be a heavy financial burden on an economy that is already struggling due to years of chronic mismanagement and international sanctions". The first monument to be at least partially dedicated to Kim Jong Un was announced in January 2017. It is to be constructed on Mount Paektu and also includes monuments dedicated to Kim Il Sung and Kim Jong Il. Additionally, stand alone "mosaic murals" of Kim Jong Un are being planned for major cities in each province.

Kim Jong Un has put forward views different from those of Kim Il Sung and Kim Jong Il and has tried to distance himself from them. In March 2019, Kim Jong Un said that the North Korean supreme leader should not be mystified in order to avoid negative impacts, and further stated that showing the greatness and mystery of the North Korean supreme leader is a contradictory event and an act of covering up the facts. In June 2019, Daily NK reported that Kim Jong Un was critical after watching the mass gymnastics "The People's Country", saying that the North Korean supreme leader should not be idolized and that reality should be the main focus.

During the 2024 New Year's performance broadcast by Korean Central Television, when the song "Nothing in the World to Envy" was played, the lyrics "Our father is Marshal Kim Il Sung" (우리의아버진김일성원수님) were changed to "Our father is Marshal Kim Jong Un" ( 우리의아버진김정은원수님). It is believed that this is the first time the lyrics have been changed since the song was first sung in 1961, and it is intended to reinforce the principle of the sole ideology centered on Kim Jong Un.

=== Changes following the abandonment of Korean reunification ===
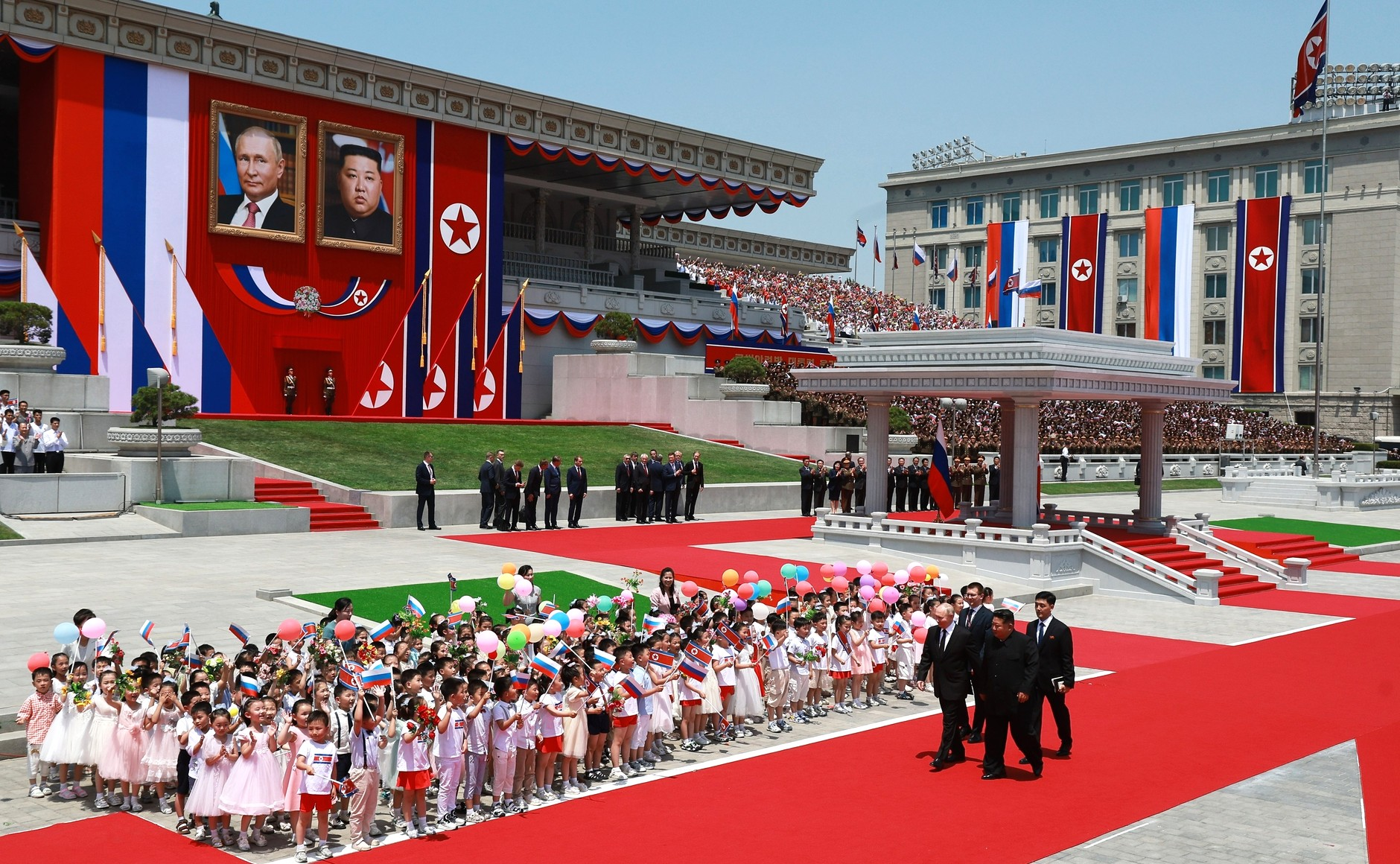
During Russian President Vladimir Putin's visit to North Korea in 2024, portraits of the Kim Jong Un and Putin were displayed on Kim Il Sung Square.

Since North Korea announced its abandonment of Korean reunification, the North Korean government has been pushing forward the process of establishing a personality cult of Kim Jong Un, including by downplaying the original names of Kim Il Sung's birthday and Kim Jong Il's birthday, namely the Day of the Sun and the Day of the Shining Star, so that the work of establishing a personality cult in North Korea that focused on Kim Jong Un.

Before 2024, Kim Il Sung's birthday was commonly known as Day of the Sun. Since 2024, North Korean media have changed the name of Day of the Sun in their political propaganda to "April Festival" (4월의명절), "Greatest National Celebration" (민족최대의경사스러), "Birthday of the Great Leader Comrade Kim Il Sung (위대한수령김일성동지의탄생). The term "Day of the Sun" only appeared in reports on the day of the festival on 15 April. By 2026, Kim Jong Un missed four consecutive commemorative events at the Kumsusan Palace of the Sun on Kim Il Sung's birthday. On Kim Il Sung's birthday in 2025, the North Korean government praised Kim Il Sung's great achievements while also emphasizing loyalty to Kim Jong Un. According to Daily NK, Kim Jong Un intends to become North Korea's "new sun" and replace Kim Il Sung's sun status, and the North Korean government intends to force North Koreans to call Kim Jong Un "the sun." On Kim Il Sung's birthday in 2026, the General Association of Koreans in China sent a congratulatory letter to Kim Jong Un, referring to him as "the great sun of Juche Korea" (주체조선의위대한태양).

Yonhap News Agency believes that the North Korean government reduced its use of the term "Day of the Sun" because it was wary of excessive worship of Kim Il Sung by the North Korean people. Yonhap believes that it also reflects Kim Jong Un's confidence in his governance after more than ten years in power and his belief that his personality cult image can stand alone. Agence France-Presse stated that Kim Jong Un's participation in activities has shown that he is focusing on himself rather than commemorating Kim Il Sung and Kim Jong Il. In this regard, AFP believes that firstly, Kim Jong Un is breaking away from the established pattern of the North Korean government's previous commemorative activities centered on remembering Kim Il Sung and Kim Jong Il and holding them in a routine manner every year, and is turning to shaping his own leadership image style; secondly, Kim aims to show the independent path that he has mentioned, and to create an atmosphere in the public opinion level that "Kim Jong Un's achievements have surpassed those of Kim Il Sung and Kim Jong Il". Although Kim Jong Un has not participated in the Kumsusan Palace of the Sun ceremony on Kim Il Sung's birthday for four consecutive years, officials of the Central Committee of the Workers' Party of Korea visited the palace on the anniversary. AFP pointed out that this shows that Kim Jong Un has not completely severed ties with Kim Il Sung and Kim Jong Il by 2026, and has formed a balance: on the one hand, Kim Jong Un demonstrates his own authority in the new era of North Korea; on the other hand, he downplays the deification of Kim Il Sung and Kim Jong Il.

On 16 April 2024, Korean Central Television released the song "Friendly Father" and a corresponding video while reporting on the completion ceremony of the second phase of 10,000 housing units in the Hwaseong area of Pyongyang. The video portrayed North Korea as a modern and normal country and showed North Korean people using modern technology, deviating from previous stereotypes about North Korea. The purpose of releasing the song and the corresponding video was to raise Kim Jong Un's status in North Korea and to no longer regard him as the successor of Kim Il Sung and Kim Jong Il, but as a manifestation of Kim Jong Un shaping a new era image. The New York Times also reported that North Korean officials have been praising Kim Jong Un in the same way they have praised Kim Il Sung and Kim Jong Il in the past, calling Kim Jong Un the "sun" and "father" of the North Korean people. TVBS reported that the Hwasong-17 fireworks model and toy model that appeared on North Korean Central Television on 19 May 2024 as a signal to demonstrate Kim Jong Un's establishment of a personality cult.

On 22 May 2024, in a photo compilation of the completion ceremony of the Central Cadres Training School of the Workers' Party of Korea reported by the Korean Central News Agency, Kim Jong Un's portrait was displayed alongside that of Kim Il Sung and Kim Jong Il for the first time. Yonhap News Agency quoted a South Korean Ministry of Unification official as saying that North Korea has placed Kim Jong Un's status at the same level as that of Kim Il Sung and Kim Jong Il during their lifetimes, and at the same time, it can accelerate the process of establishing Kim Jong Un's personality cult image and strengthen North Korea's cult of personality to show Kim Jong Un's leadership position as the spiritual leader of the new era of North Korea. Yonhap News Agency also predicted that the North Korean government would increase its propaganda on "Kim Jong Un's revolutionary thought" on the basis of the previous propaganda of Juche ideology and Kimilsungism–Kimjongilism. The New York Times reported that the North Korean government has distributed portraits of Kim Jong Un for people from all walks of life in North Korea to hang in buildings.

North Korea started phasing out the Juche calendar from 17 October 2024. Yonhap News Agency believes that North Korea's move is to make the Kim Il Sung era and the Kim Jong Il era a historical era, while Kim Jong Un will create the Kim Jong Un era. Yonhap News Agency also quoted the views of Hong Min, a researcher at the Korea Institute for National Unification, who pointed out that North Korea believes that emphasizing the era name in 2024 is a manifestation of feudalism, while eliminating the era name is a sign that North Korea is moving towards modernization by eliminating the dross.

Kim Jong Il's birthday was commonly referred to as the Day of the Shining Star until 2025. However, since 2025, North Korean media have changed the name of the day in their political propaganda to "a significant February festival" (뜻깊은2월의명절) and "the most joyous February festival for the nation" (민족최대의경사스러운2월의명절). The term "Day of the Shining Star" only appeared in reports on the day of the festival, 16 February. AFP analyzed that Kim Jong Un has been in power since 2012 and has formed "Kim Jong Unism" after more than ten years of governance over North Korea. Furthermore, Kim Jong Un is trying to break free from the influence of Kim Il Sung and Kim Jong Il at the level of governance. At the same time, with North Korea's economy in a slump and facing a food crisis, Kim Jong Un portrays himself as a leader who spares no effort to improve the quality of life for the North Korean people. At this time, AFP states that if he were to overemphasize the image of Kim Il Sung and Kim Jong Il, it would not be conducive to Kim Jong Un establishing his own personality cult image, and might even provoke resentment from the North Korean people. The JoongAng Ilbo stated that Kim Jong Un's refusal to use the term "Day of the Shining Star" was intended to negate the legacy of Kim Il Sung and Kim Jong Il's proposal for the unification of the Korean Peninsula, and to place his own governance achievements above those of Kim Il Sung and Kim Jong Il. This move was also part of the action to erase the existing achievements of Kim Il Sung and Kim Jong Il.

After Kim Jong Un was re-elected General Secretary of the Workers' Party of Korea at the 9th Congress of the Workers' Party of Korea, North Korean media dubbed him "the greatest man in the world." During the proposal speech for the election of General Secretary of the Workers' Party of Korea, Ri Il-hwan made the following evaluation of Kim Jong Un:

The Korean people, with their revolutionary spirit closely united around Comrade Kim Jong Un, have achieved tremendous accomplishments that could not be achieved in seven years and would be difficult to achieve even in 70 years.

Yonhap News Agency analyzed that this move shows that the North Korean government is increasing its efforts to establish a cult of personality of Kim Jong Un. Daily NK said that since the end of the 9th Congress, the North Korean government has started to create a separate image of Kim Jong Un's personality cult and taught the North Korean people to absolutely obey Kim Jong Un's orders rather than the legacy of Kim Il Sung and Kim Jong Il, leading to some North Koreans to be confused.

== Others ==
The personality cult extends to other members of the Kim family, although to a lesser degree.

=== Kim Ŭngu ===
According to the official North Korean history, Kim Ŭngu, Kim Il Sung's paternal great-grandfather, fought against the American schooner USS General Sherman in the 1866 incident and was also an anti-Japanese activist. However, these claims remain unsubstantiated and many historians outside of North Korea doubt their legitimacy.

=== Kang Pan Sok ===
Kang Pan Sok, the mother of Kim Il Sung, was the first member of the Kim family to have a cult of personality of her own to supplement that of her son's, from the late 1960s onwards. In addition to a museum and statue in Chilgol, her birthplace, and the Kang Pan Sok Revolutionary Academy in Pyongyang, she has been given the title "Mother of Korea" and has had songs and articles written in praise of her.

=== Kim Hyong-jik ===
Kim Hyong-jik, the father of Kim Il Sung, is venerated by official North Korean historiographies for having been a prominent leader of the anti-colonial Korean independence movement. In fact, official sources claim that Kim not only led the March 1st Uprising of 1919, but also that it took place in Pyongyang—both blatant fabrications. North Korean histography also states that even when Kim Hyong-jik was arrested and imprisoned, his will did not change under torture. While in reality Kim was at one point briefly detained for anti-Japanese activities, most outside scholars do not support claims of anything further. In fact, according to biographer Dae-Sook Suh, efforts to describe Kim Hyong-jik as playing a major role in the anti-Japanese struggle "seem to be directed more toward upgrading the attributes of Kim [Il-sung] as a pious son." This attribution became important as Kim Il Sung used these stories to aid his ascent to power.

In 1975, the North Korean government renamed Pyongyang First Normal University as Kim Hyong Jik Normal University in honor of Kim Hyong Jik. The North Korean government also established the Bonghwa Revolutionary Site Museum in Gangdong, Pyongyang, as a memorial. Kim Hyong-jik currently has a museum and statue dedicated to him in his hometown of Ponghwa.

=== Kim Hyong-gwon ===
Kim Hyong-gwon, paternal uncle of Kim Il Sung and brother of Kim Hyong-jik, is honored in North Korea as an anti-Japanese activist because he skirmished with local police in Pungsan County, for which he was arrested sentenced to 15 years in prison for assaulting a police officer and was sent to Seodaemun Prison, where he died on January 12, 1936. The North Korean government began to cultivate a personality cult around him in 1976. There is a statue in his honor in Hongwon, the site of the skirmish. Kim Il Sung later renamed the Pungsan County in southeastern Ryanggang Province after his uncle. It is called Kimhyonggwon County.

=== Kim Jong Suk ===
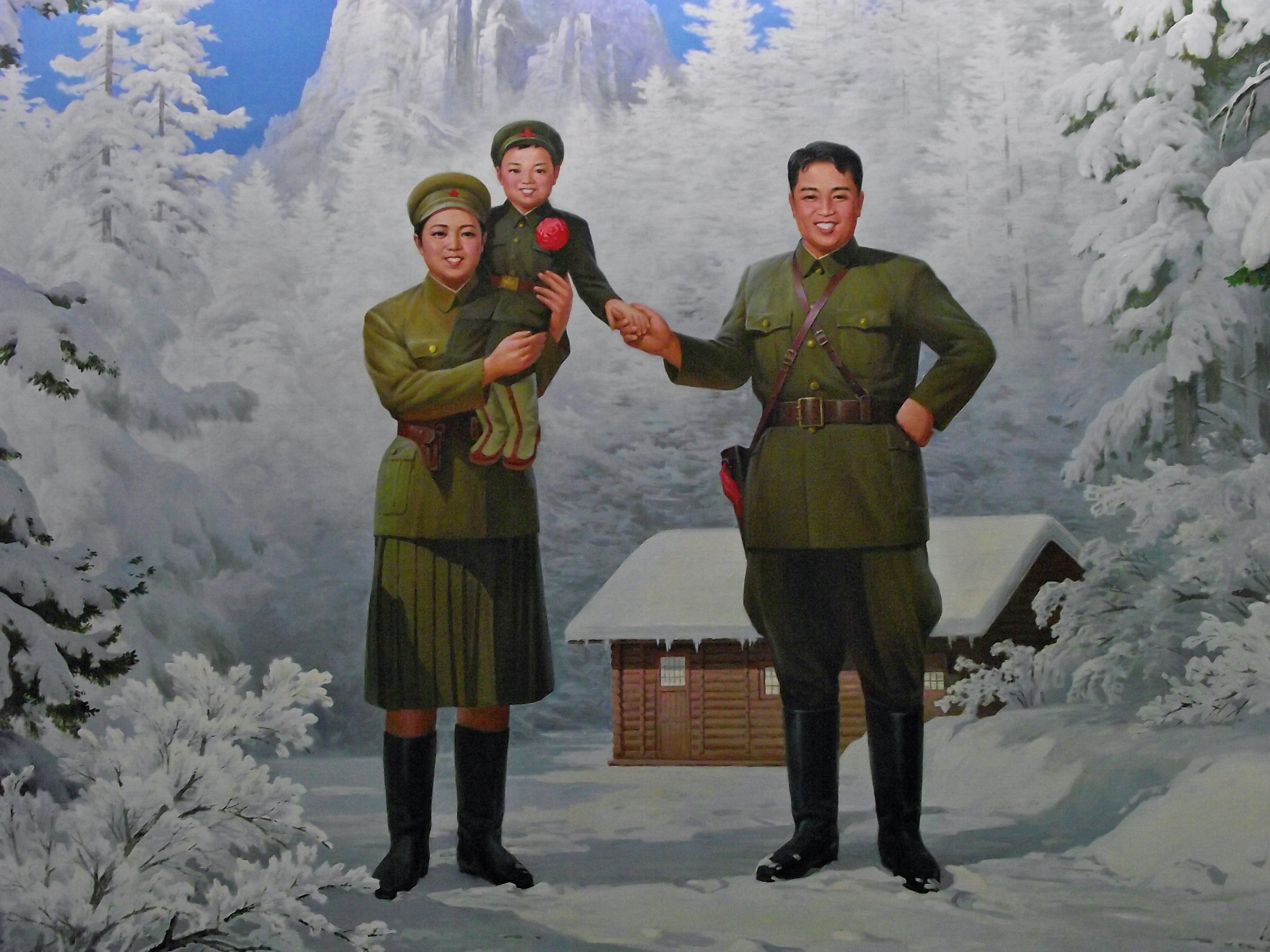
A painting of both Kim Jong Suk, the mother of Kim Jong Il, and Kim Il Sung

Kim Jong Suk, mother of Kim Jong Il, is described as "a revolutionary immortal" and "an anti-Japanese war hero [who] upheld the original idea and policy of Kim Il Sung and performed distinguished feats in the development of the movement for the women's emancipation in Korea." She is typified as a model revolutionary, wife, and maternal figure, and North Korean society looks to stories of her as examples of how to live life.

Although she was First Lady of North Korea in the first year of its founding in 1948, she died in 1949 at the age of 31, and starting in 1974, in conjunction with her son Kim Jong Il's rise to position as the heir apparent, she was increasingly praised and her accomplishments memorialized throughout the nation. A museum and statue was built in her home town of Hoeryong in her honor and she was called an "indomitable Communist revolutionary" by Kim Sung-ae who was Kim Il Sung's then present wife, despite being largely ignored until this point. Thus, originally she was honored as a guerrilla, but not necessarily as a mother or wife.

In 1981, the North Korean government renamed the former Sinpo County to Kimjongsuk County in her honor. In the 1990s, Kim Jong Suk's portrait was even added to those of Kim Il Sung and Kim Jong Il, which were displayed in every household and building and treated as sacred objects of veneration and worship. Furthermore, when referring to the "three Great Generals of Paekdu Mountain," a sacred dormant volcano on North Korea's northern border with China, North Koreans understand this to mean Kim Il Sung, Kim Jong Suk, and their son Kim Jong Il. There is a wax replica of her in the International Friendship Exhibition and her statue erected in her home town, where her birthplace is preserved.

=== Ko Yong Hui ===
Ko Yong Hui, the third wife of Kim Jong Il and mother of Kim Jong Un, has been described as the "heroine of the Songun revolution" (선군혁명의 녀성영웅) and the "most loyal among the most loyal in the frontline defending the General (Kim Jong Il)". There have been three attempts made to idolize her in a style similar to that associated with Kim Jong Suk and Kang Pan Sok, once in the late 90s, the early 2000s and again in the early 2010s. During her marriage to Kim Jong Il, her identity was never made nationally aware, despite routinely accompanying Kim on field inspections of military bases and various industrial installations. In 2011, an internal propaganda film was produced about her activities with Kim Jong Il during his leadership and touched on her important role in raising her son. The film however did not mention her background or biography. As North Korean media campaigned for Kim Jong Un's succession in 2009, Kim Jong Un also began renovations on the tomb of Ko Yong Hui at the Revolutionary Martyrs' Cemetery on Mount Taesong. With Kim Jong Un becoming the supreme leader of North Korea, the renovations on Ko Yong Hui's tomb were completed in June 2012.

However, building of a cult of personality around Ko encounters the problem of her bad songbun (social class status), as her Korean-Japanese heritage and her father's work experience in the Imperial Japanese Army Textile Factory would make her part of the lowest "hostile" class. Kim Il Sung refused to recognize Ko as a legitimate wife and Kim Jong Un as his legitimate grandson, placing a strain on the mystical purity of the bloodline. Because of this, efforts to idolize her have been shifted or redacted, with satellite imagery showing visitors to her gravesite were restricted after 2015. The reason why the North Korean government's three attempts to establish a personality cult of Ko Yong-hui ended in failure was largely because Ko Yong-hui's lineage itself was not suitable for large-scale propaganda, and on the contrary, it would be detrimental to the North Korean government's political propaganda efforts. Nowadays, she is still alluded to in some North Korean biographies about Kim Jong Un and in various monuments and texts. She is referred to as "Mother of Great Songun Korea" (선군조선의 어머님) or "respected Mother" (존경하는 어머님), with her name not being public knowledge. Yonhap News Agency believes that Ko Yong Hui's background may be one of the reasons why the North Korean government has kept a low profile in its response to Kim Jong Un's birthday.

== Familism in the personality cult ==
Familism is a type of collectivism in which the one is expected to prioritize the needs of the greater society or family over the needs of the individual.

Familism in North Korea stems from a combination of the traditional East Asian Confucian value of filial piety, the communist system of collectivism, and the Kim cult of personality. As a traditional East Asian and Confucian value, the importance of family has come to resonate through all aspects of North Korean life, from politics to the economy to education and even to interpersonal relationships between friends and enemies.

When the Soviet Union first entered North Korea in 1945 to start its occupation, it had to start almost from scratch in establishing a communist base in the capital region of Pyongyang. In fact, the Soviets' ideologies of communism and socialism were likely as foreign to the Koreans of Pyongyang as the Soviets themselves. However, by emphasizing family and a father-child relationship between the Soviet Union and Korea, and later between Kim Il Sung and the North Korean people, Kim not only managed to apply Western Marxism to an Asian state, but also to secure his own personality cult, thereby constructing a sense of unquestioning loyalty toward him amongst the North Korean people when North Korea was at its most vulnerable to unwelcome western influences.

The cults of personality also promote the idea of the ruling Kims as a model family. In grief over the death of his second son, Kim Man-il in 1947, Kim Il Sung returned to the very same spot a decade later with a Korean shaman to perform rituals to "assuage his loss and pain." There was particular stress on the Confucian filial love of the son for his parents. After their deaths Kim dedicated monuments to his father and mother, respectively.

However, biographer Dae-Sook Suh doubts the sincerity of Kim's displays of reverence of his parents. In considering Kim's relatively independent childhood, Suh does not believe that Kim held any special love for his parents that would necessitate separate museums and statues for each. Instead, Suh says that "his purpose, rather, seems to be more self-serving: an effort to build his own image as a pious Korean son from a revolutionary family." By publicly portraying himself as a loyal son who loved his mother and father, Kim positioned himself to demand the same filial loyalty from his subjects.

Likewise, in celebration of his father's 60th birthday, Kim Jong Il produced three operas for him, built three monuments, including North Korea's Arch of Triumph, for his 70th birthday in 1982, and upon Kim Il Sung's death in 1994, Kim Jong Il declared three years of mourning before fully claiming leadership of North Korea.

== Monuments, images and cost ==
=== Statues and monuments ===
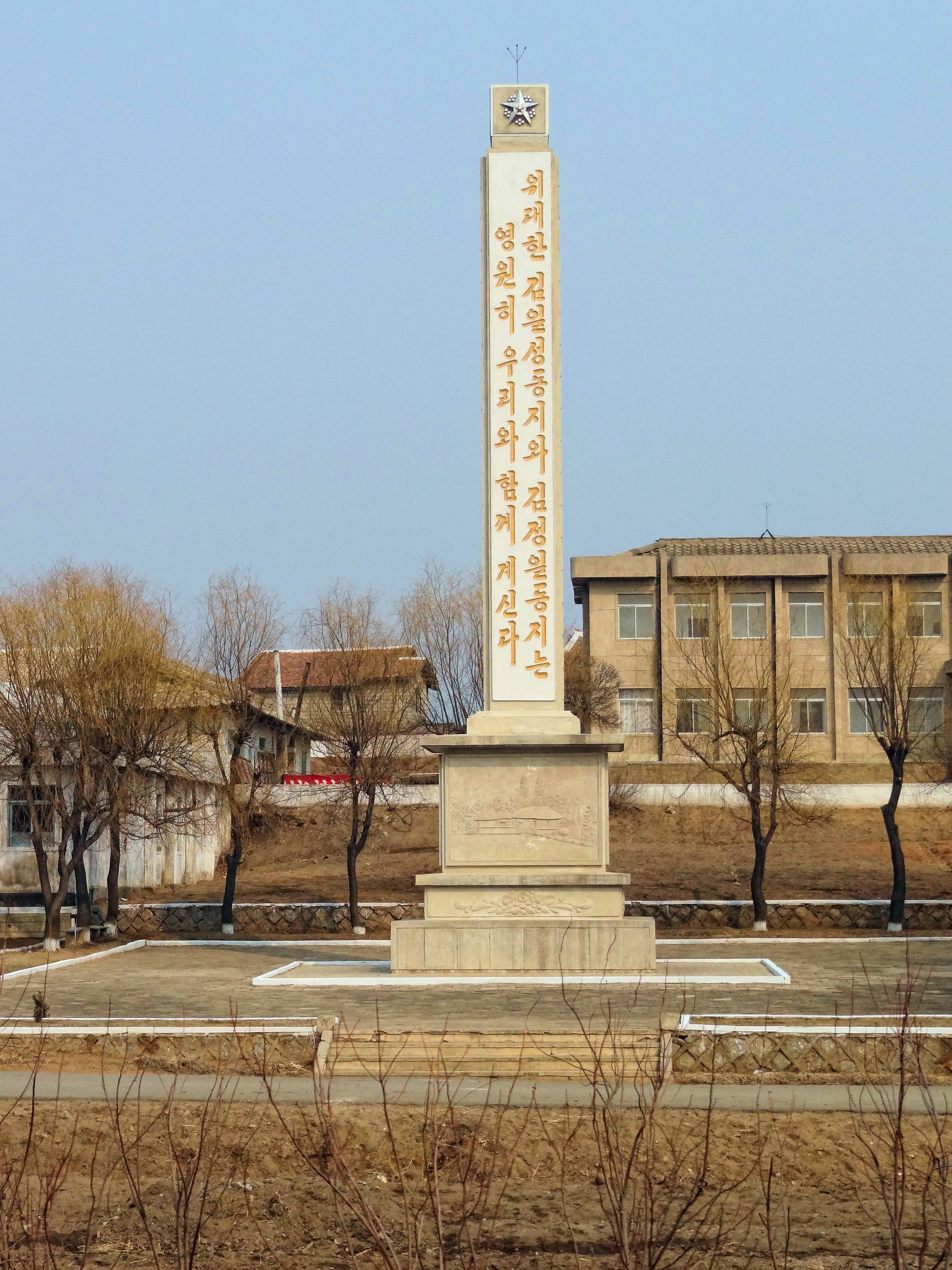
One of the many Towers of Eternal Life

By 1992, according to Victor Cha, there had been nearly 40,000 statues of Kim Il Sung erected throughout the country. As of 2012, North Korea had the most statues of its political leader in the world, totaling approximately 30,000.Open Doors stated that as of 2024, the North Korean government had erected more than 35,000 statues of the North Korean supreme leader throughout the country.

With Kim Il Sung's death in 1994, Kim Jong Il issued the directive "Remembering the leader will always be with us" and the government began erecting 3,200 obelisks, called "Towers of Eternal Life", in every town and city. These obelisks espouse the virtues of the "Great Marshal" and, like the other monuments, citizens (and tourists) are required to present flowers and other tokens of respect to the statues during certain holidays and when they visit them. After Kim Jong Il's death in 2011, the North Korean government began maintenance work on the Towers of Immortality in August 2012, inscribing his name on each of the obelisks and build new statues in his image. During public holidays , North Korean citizens, including tourists visiting North Korea, offer flowers and bow to the statues or monuments to show their respect for the deceased supreme leader of North Korea. A 2018 review of satellite imagery revealed the existence of no fewer than 11,200 outside monuments and murals.

The North Korean government considers statues and monuments reflecting the image of the North Korean supreme leader as the embodiment of the North Korean supreme leader, and therefore strictly controls them to ensure their safety. If any North Korean citizen damages a statue or monument reflecting the image of the North Korean supreme leader, they will be prosecuted for a serious crime. However, since the North Korean famine, the North Korean people have expressed dissatisfaction with the North Korean government's continued focus on building a personality cult during the famine, resulting in cases of damage to statues and monuments reflecting the image of the North Korean supreme leader.

The Kumsusan Palace of the Sun was built as the official residence of Kim Il Sung in 1976. After his death it was converted into his mausoleum (and then that of his son). It is reported to have cost between $100 million and $900 million. Kumsusan is the largest mausoleum dedicated to a communist leader.

=== Images ===
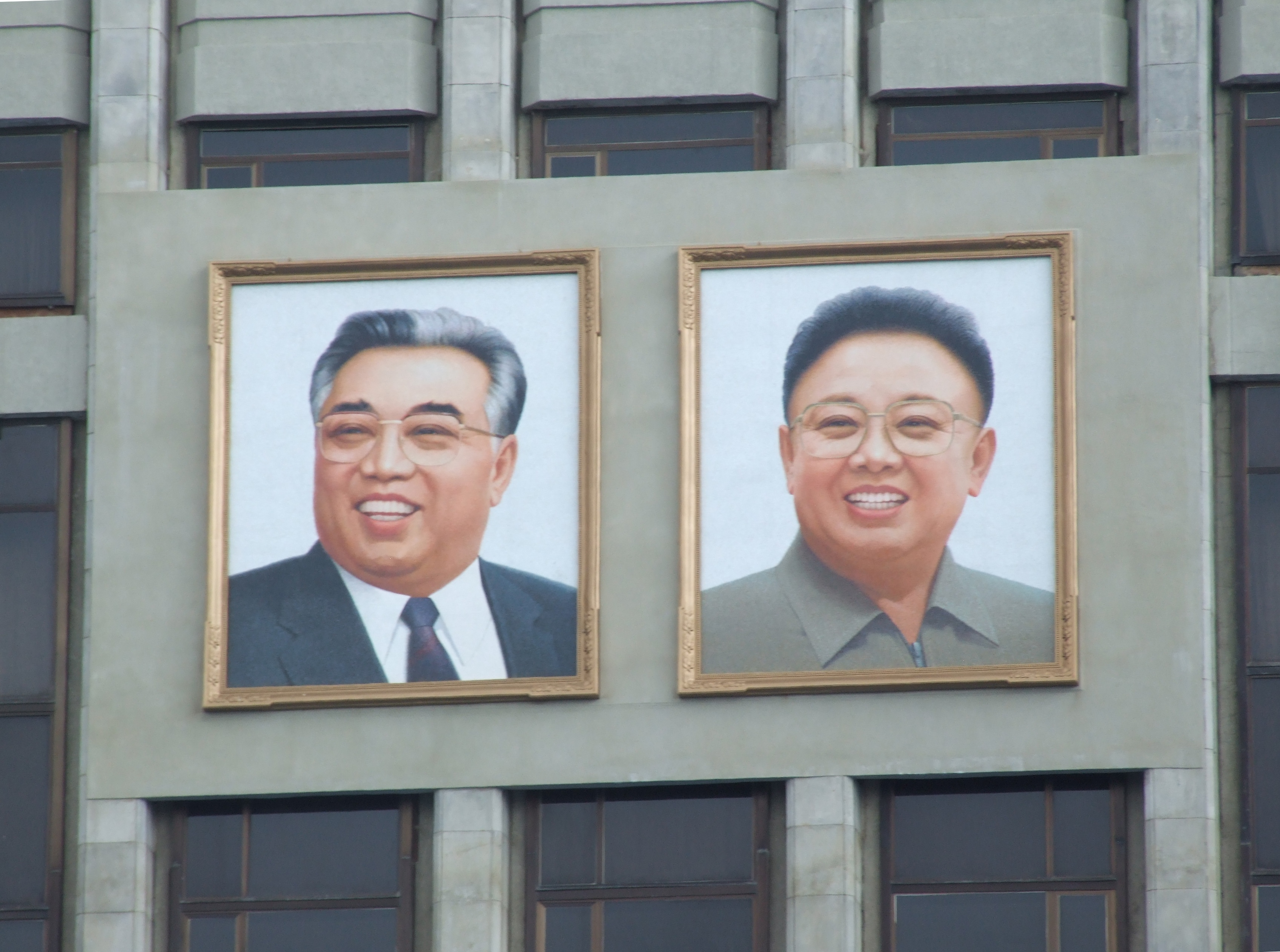
Portraits on the Mangyongdae Children's Palace

Images of Kim Il Sung and Kim Jong Il are prominent in places associated with public transportation, hanging at every North Korean train station and airport. Every North Korean household is required to have a picture of both Kims hanging on a wall. Nothing else may hang on that wall and they are given special cloths to clean the images daily. Party members in neighborhoods are assigned to inspect houses for dusty portraits. If dust is found, a fine has to be paid, its amount depending on the thickness of the layer. The portraits have to be hung high up, so that people in the room may not stand higher than them. Party cadres and military officials must keep three portraits, that of the two deceased leaders and one of Kim Il Sung's wife, Kim Jong Suk. The images are only allowed to be made by government approved artists at specific Mansudae workshops. Images found within newspapers or other publications are to be respected and one must not throw away, deface or otherwise misuse a page that contains an image. They are to be collected and returned.

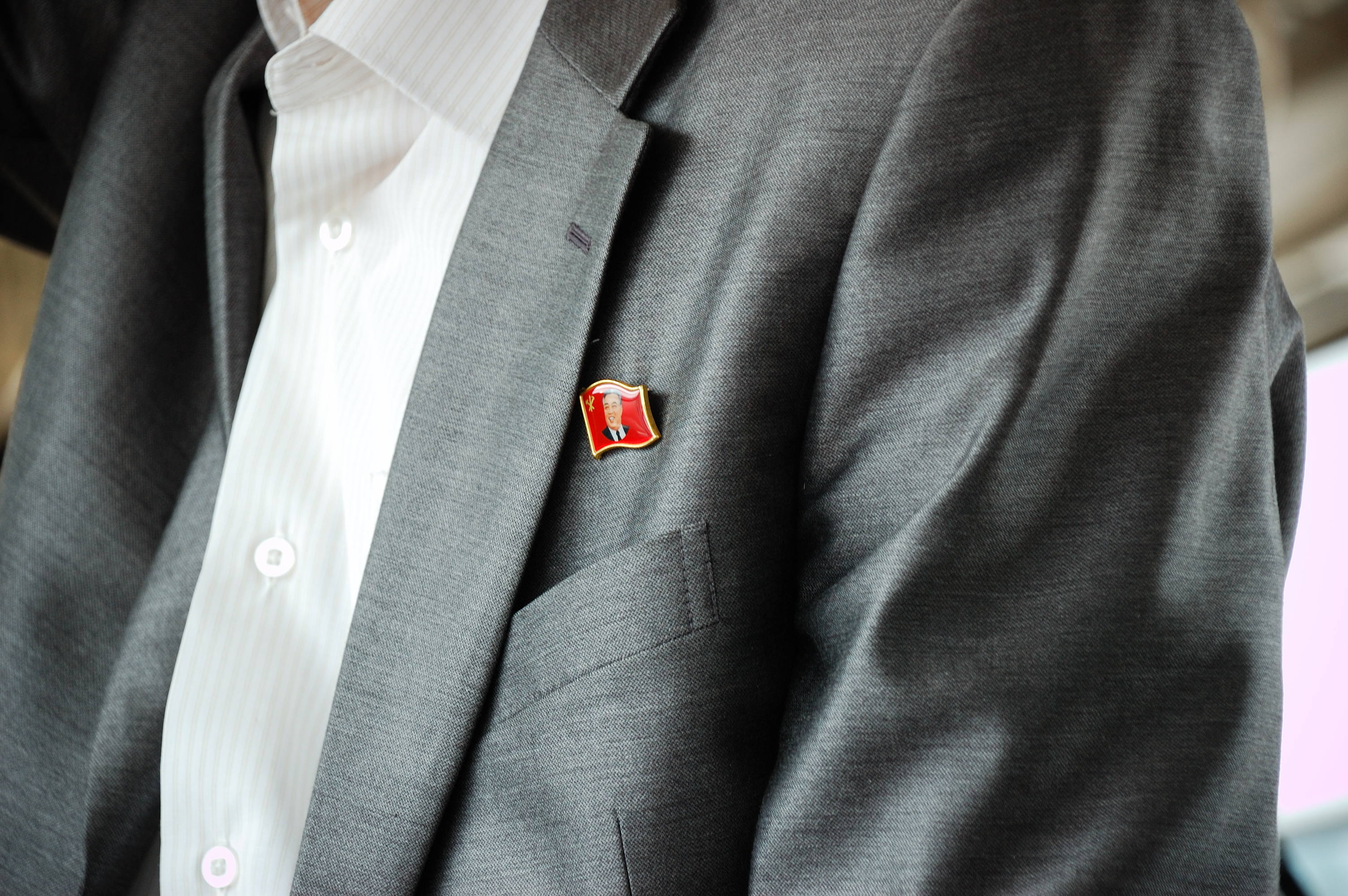
A Kim Il Sung lapel pin

There have been sporadic stories of people risking their lives to save the portraits from various disasters but few accounts have been verified. In 2012, a 14-year-old girl drowned while trying to save the images from her family's home during a flash flood. The North Korean government posthumously bestowed upon her the "Kim Jong Il Youth Honor Award" and her school was renamed after her.

According to Daily NK, since the Central Cadres Training School of the Workers' Party of Korea set a precedent by hanging a portrait of Kim Jong Un, other Workers' Party schools in North Korea would follow suit and hang portraits of Kim Jong Un next to the other portraits.

=== Badges ===
Adult North Koreans are also required to wear a lapel pin that features their image on the left side, above their heart. The design inspiration for the badges of the North Korean supreme leader comes from the Chairman Mao badges that appeared in China during the Cultural Revolution. Hwang Jang-yop, a former member of the Central Committee of the Workers' Party of Korea , said that the badges of Kim Il Sung were created because the personality cult of Kim Il Sung was objectively strengthened after the Kapsan faction incident in 1967, and the badges were created to show loyalty to Kim Il Sung. The Chinese government has never required Chinese people to wear badges of Mao Zedong, but for North Korean people, wearing badges of the North Korean supreme leader is mandatory. Half a century after their introduction, the badges of the North Korean supreme leader have become an indispensable part of the daily attire of North Korean people. Therefore, analysts believe that the influence of the badges of the North Korean supreme leader on North Korean culture is far greater than the influence of the badges of Mao Zedong on Chinese culture.

Although the North Korean government mandated that North Koreans wear badges bearing the image of the Supreme Leader of North Korea, the badges began to lose their place in the hearts of North Koreans after the North Korean famine. Some North Koreans even smuggled the badges, which were once considered sacred, to China and sold them as cheap souvenirs. North Korean citizens are required to wear badges bearing the image of the Supreme Leader of North Korea from the age of 12. North Korean citizens aged 16 and above are required to wear badges bearing the image of the Supreme Leader of North Korea in all non-family settings. The North Korean government stipulates that badges bearing the image of the Supreme Leader of North Korea must be worn over inner clothing, such as on a shirt or the lapel of a suit. In terms of placement, they are usually worn on the left side above the heart. Most North Koreans also carry badges bearing the image of the Supreme Leader with them when leaving the country. Although North Korean officials claim that wearing badges of the Supreme Leader of North Korea is out of "absolute loyalty," for North Koreans, wearing badges of the Supreme Leader is to avoid questioning by the North Korean government. In a few environments, such as religious sites, it is permissible not to wear badges of the Supreme Leader.

At the 10th Plenary Session of the 8th Central Committee of the Workers' Party of Korea on 30 June 2024, when the Korean Central News Agency (KCNA) filmed officials of the Central Committee of the Workers' Party of Korea, some officials had already begun wearing badges with Kim Jong Un's image. The KCNA commented that North Korea's move was "a deification without limits." The New York Times , however, believed that if North Korea followed its usual practice, Kim Jong-un's badges would eventually become the most common badge choice for North Koreans.

=== Cost ===
The overall estimated cost of maintaining the personality cult varies greatly between published sources. A white paper by the Korea Institute for International Economic Policy placed the cost at 38.5% of North Korea's budget in 2004, up from 19% in 1990. However, other sources such as South Korea's Chosun Ilbo and the United Kingdom's Daily Telegraph estimate the cost in 2012 at between $40 million and $100 million respectively. Large scale construction projects for the Kim family have been blamed for the country's economic downturn in the 1980s.

== Holidays ==
Within North Korea, the birthdays of Kim Il Sung and Kim Jong Il are considered more important than the Korean New Year. The North Korean government also typically strengthens its control over Pyongyang and the border areas during the holidays and issues a "Special Security Week" order to enter a state of "extreme martial law." According to Daily NK, the North Korean government also regulates street vendors, illegal sales, and homeless beggars during the birthday celebrations of the Supreme Leader. Children in North Korea receive gifts such as cookies and candy during the birthdays of Kim Il Sung, Kim Jong Il, and Kim Jong Un.

In 2013, a new holiday was announced to be celebrated on February 14, which commemorates the date that Kim Jong Il assumed the title "Generalissimo of the Democratic People's Republic of Korea". Unlike celebrations surrounding other important figures throughout the world, the celebrations of Kim are mandatory, with numerous events planned (such as dances, sporting events and parades), and citizens will place gifts of flowers at the foot of monuments. Birthday celebrations for the Kims also involve state media broadcasts of films about the lives and accomplishments of the leaders the night before the actual holiday.

As of 2026, Kim Jong Un's birthday has not yet been officially designated as a holiday, and the scale of North Korean celebrations is not as large as those for Kim Il Sung and Kim Jong Il. However, according to Daily NK, the North Korean government calls on various organizations and units to organize special security teams during Kim Jong-un's birthday, and the security of various offices and people's units is also strengthened at the same time, making the level of security comparable to that of Kim Il Sung and Kim Jong Il. Therefore, the North Korean people have gradually begun to regard Kim Jong-un's birthday as a North Korean holiday. Daily NK also pointed out that the North Korean people have long been accustomed to the special security during North Korean holidays, so the North Korean people generally have a positive attitude towards Kim Jong-un's birthday. Yonhap News Agency said that Kim Jong-un may have deliberately celebrated his birthday in a low-key manner because he considered that "institutionalizing the birthday of a young supreme leader" would trigger resentment among the North Korean people in the early stages of his rule.

== International inspirations ==
Between 60,000 and 220,000 gifts to Kim Il Sung and Kim Jong Il from foreign leaders, businesspersons and others are housed in the International Friendship Exhibition. The museum is a source of pride for the North Korean government and is used as evidence of the greatness and popularity of their leaders. The North Korean government places a large emphasis on international recognition in order to legitimize their rule in the minds of the population. Tours are arranged to the Exhibition Hall whereupon entering and leaving visitors must pay homage by bowing before images of Kim Il Sung and Kim Jong Il, as per Korean manners and tradition.

== See also ==
- Media coverage of North Korea
- Juche
- Imperial cult
- Charismatic authority
- Propaganda in North Korea
- Paektu Mountain
- The General Uses Warp
- Death and state funeral of Kim Jong Il
- Stalin's cult of personality
- Succession of Kim Jong Un
- Song of General Kim Il Sung
- Mao Zedong's cult of personality
- Xi Jinping's cult of personality
- Nicolae Ceaușescu's cult of personality
- Trumpism
- List of cults of personality

== Bibliography ==
- Alton, David; Chidley, Rob (2013). Building Bridges: Is There Hope for North Korea?. Lion Books. ISBN 978-0745955988.
- Burdick, Eddie (2010), Three Days in the Hermit Kingdom: An American Visits North Korea, McFarland, ISBN 978-0786448982
- Demick, Barbara (2009), Nothing to Envy: Ordinary Lives in North Korea, Random House LLC, ISBN 978-0385523912
- Hassig, Ralph (2009), The Hidden People of North Korea: Everyday Life in the Hermit Kingdom, Rowman & Littlefield, ISBN 978-0742567184
- Kim, Samuel S (2001), The North Korean System in the Post-Cold War Era, Palgrave Macmillan, ISBN 978-0312239749
- Martin, Bradley (2004), Under the Loving Care of the Fatherly Leader: North Korea and the Kim Dynasty, St. Martin's Griffin, ISBN 0312323220
- — (2006), Under the Loving Care of the Fatherly Leader: North Korea and the Kim Dynasty, St. Martin's Griffin, ISBN 0312323220
- Rüdiger, Frank (2013). North Korea in 2012: Domestic Politics, the Economy and Social Issues. Brill Publishers. pp. 41–72. ISBN 978-9004262973. Archived from the original on October 17, 2015.
- Dae-Sook, Suh (1988), Kim Il-Sung: The North Korean Leader, Columbia University Press, ISBN 978-0231065733
- Tertitskiy, Fyodor (2015), The ascension of the ordinary man: How the personality cult of Kim Il-Sung was constructed (1945–1974), Acta Koreana, archived from the original on 2018-05-22
