= Kimilsungia and Kimjongilia Exhibition Hall =

Museum in Pyongyang, North Korea

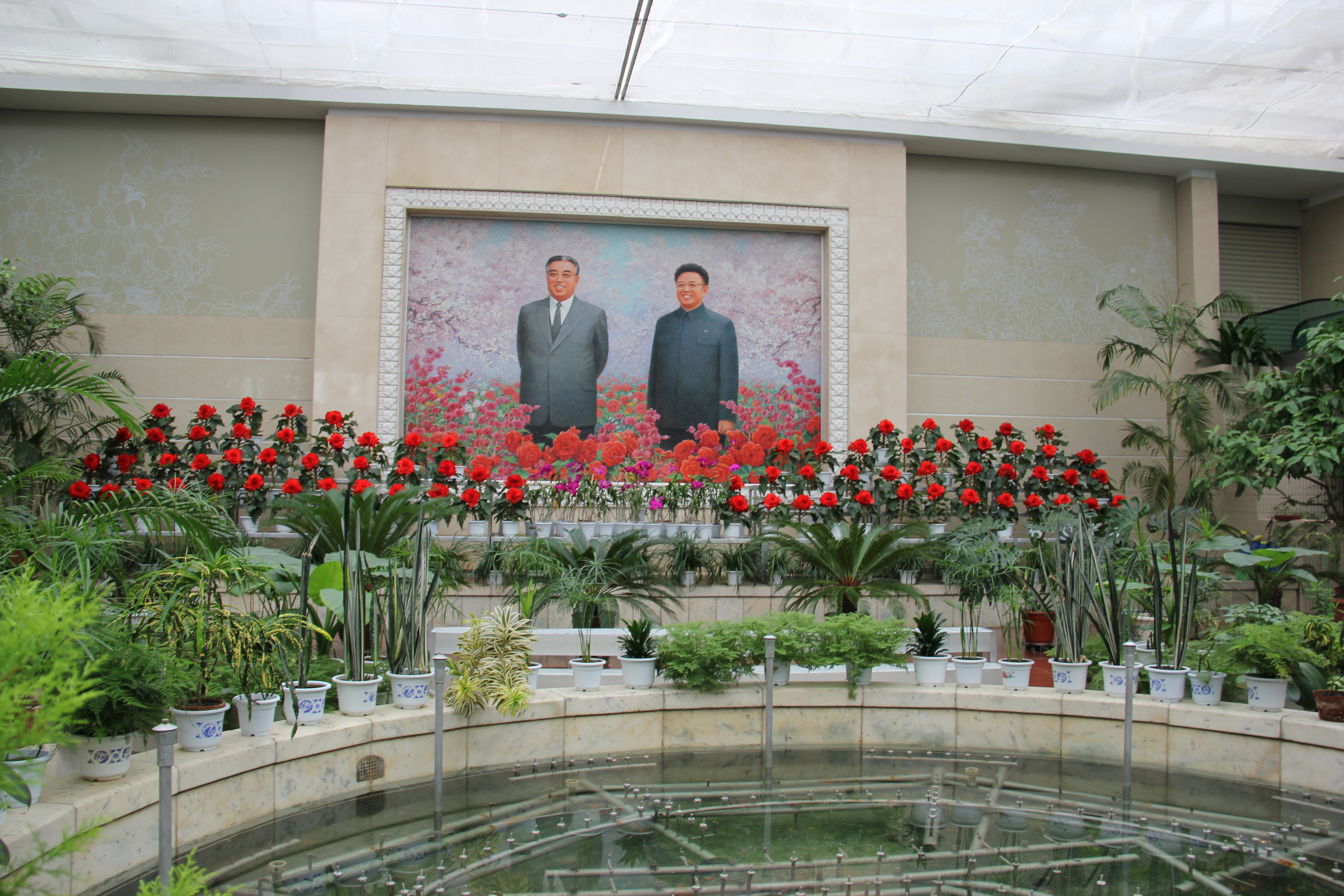
Kimilsungia and Kimjongilia Exhibition Hall. The namesake flowers are to the middle and side respectively, nearest the portrait of the Juche leaders.

The Okryu Exhibition Hall (Korean:옥류전시관/玉流展示馆), formerly known as the Kimilsungia and Kimjongilia Exhibition Hall (Korean: 김일성화김정일화전시관), is a museum located in Pyongyang, North Korea. It hosts the International Kimilsungia and Kimjongilia Festivals, which celebrate the Kimilsungia and the Kimjongilia, two flowers named after North Korean leaders Kim Il Sung and Kim Jong Il.

== History ==
The exhibition hall was initially opened in April 2002 (Juche 91), and was named the Kimilsungia and Kimjongilia Exhibition Hall. It is located close to the Monument to Party Founding. The exhibition hall is spread over two floors. It was changed to its current name in 2020. The centre displays large flower arrangements of both the Kimilsongia and Kimjongilia flowers, especially for public holidays, such as Day of the Sun and Day of the Shining Star, and the birthdays of Kim Jong Un and Kim Jong Il. During public holidays, large numbers of people visit the displays to honour their leaders. The museum hosts the International Kimilsungia and Kimjongilia Festivals, which have been hosted since the 1990s, before the opening of the hall.

== Flowers ==
Kimilsungia is a purple orchid which was named after President Kim Il Sung on 15 April 1965 during his visit to Indonesia. Kimjongilia is a red begonia bred by a Japanese botanist who particularly admired President Kim Jong Il, and presented to him on 16 February 1988 for his 46th birthday. The museum sells seeds and bulbs of the flowers to allow visitors to cultivate their own.

== See also ==
- List of museums in North Korea
