= Immortality Tower =

Type of monument in North Korea

An immortality tower (or tower of eternal life, 영생탑) are tower-shaped monuments in North Korea to commemorate the Eternal President Kim Il Sung and the Eternal General Secretary Kim Jong Il. Towers of immortality exist in various locations across the country and are a form of the Cult of Personality for the former holders of power in North Korea. These towers are heavily inspired by Korean pagoda.

Under North Korean law, every "li" (village) must have a tower of immortality.

The towers resemble obelisks and usually bear a commemorative slogan at the front and back of the monument. However, the appearance of each of the towers is distinct, all varying in shape, height, design, type of construction and content of the inscriptions. While a large number of immortality towers were already constructed in memory of Kim Il Sung, new towers were erected after Kim Jong Il's death in 2011 in his memory and Kim Jong Il's name appears on each of the towers alongside that of Kim Il Sung.

== Remarkable Immortality Towers ==
Remarkable immortality towers are located in the capital Pyongyang, the three most famous on Ryomyong Street, on Sungri Street, and on a traffic island on Sesallim Street. Another tower, identical to the one on Sungri Street, is located on Kwangbok Street, opposite the Pyongyang Circus. Famous towers have also been installed in other cities around the country, such as Hamhung, Kaesong, Rason, Sariwon, and others. Immortality towers are also known to have existed, at least in the past, in North Korean labour camps in the Russian Far East, around Tynda and the village of Unaha in the Amur region.

=== Immortality Tower of Ryomyong Street ===
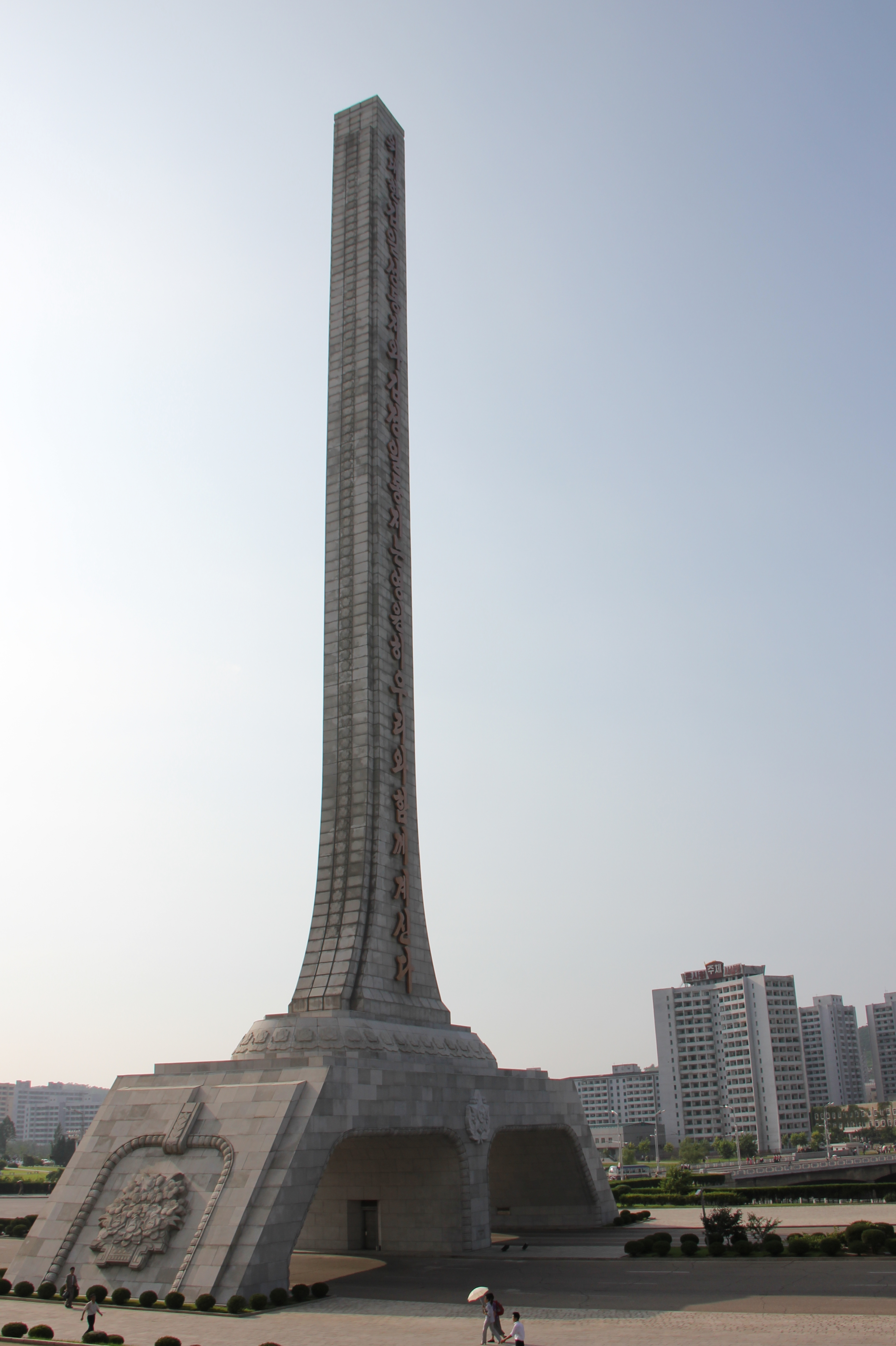
Immortality Tower, Ryomyong street in Pyongyang

One of the most famous immortality towers is the so-called "Monument of Eternal Life in Honour of President Kim Il Sung" at the beginning of Ryomyong Street (formerly Kumsong Street).

This monument was erected in 1997 in memory of Kim Il Sung, who died in 1994, covering a total area of 17000 m^{2} and extending with two arches over the artery leading to his mausoleum, the Kumsusan Palace, near the Ryonghung crossroads. It stands on a 10.50-metre-high, two-bay arch-shaped plinth through which road traffic passes on its way to the mausoleums of Kim Il Sung and Kim Jong Il. The tower is 82 metres high. On both sides of the tower are inscriptions in the form of a bronze relief. Originally, the inscriptions referred only to the "eternal president" Kim Il Sung, but they were changed after Kim Jong Il's death and the obelisks now contain the names of the two North Korean leaders.

The inscription reads as follows:

"위대한 김일성 동지와 김정일 동지는 영원히 우리와 함께 계신다"
"The great comrade leaders Kim Il Sung and Kim Jong Il will remain with us forever."

Bas-reliefs of azalea flowers are carved on the outside of the base, as well as a red star at the top measuring 3 metres in diameter.

=== Immortality Tower of Sungri Street ===
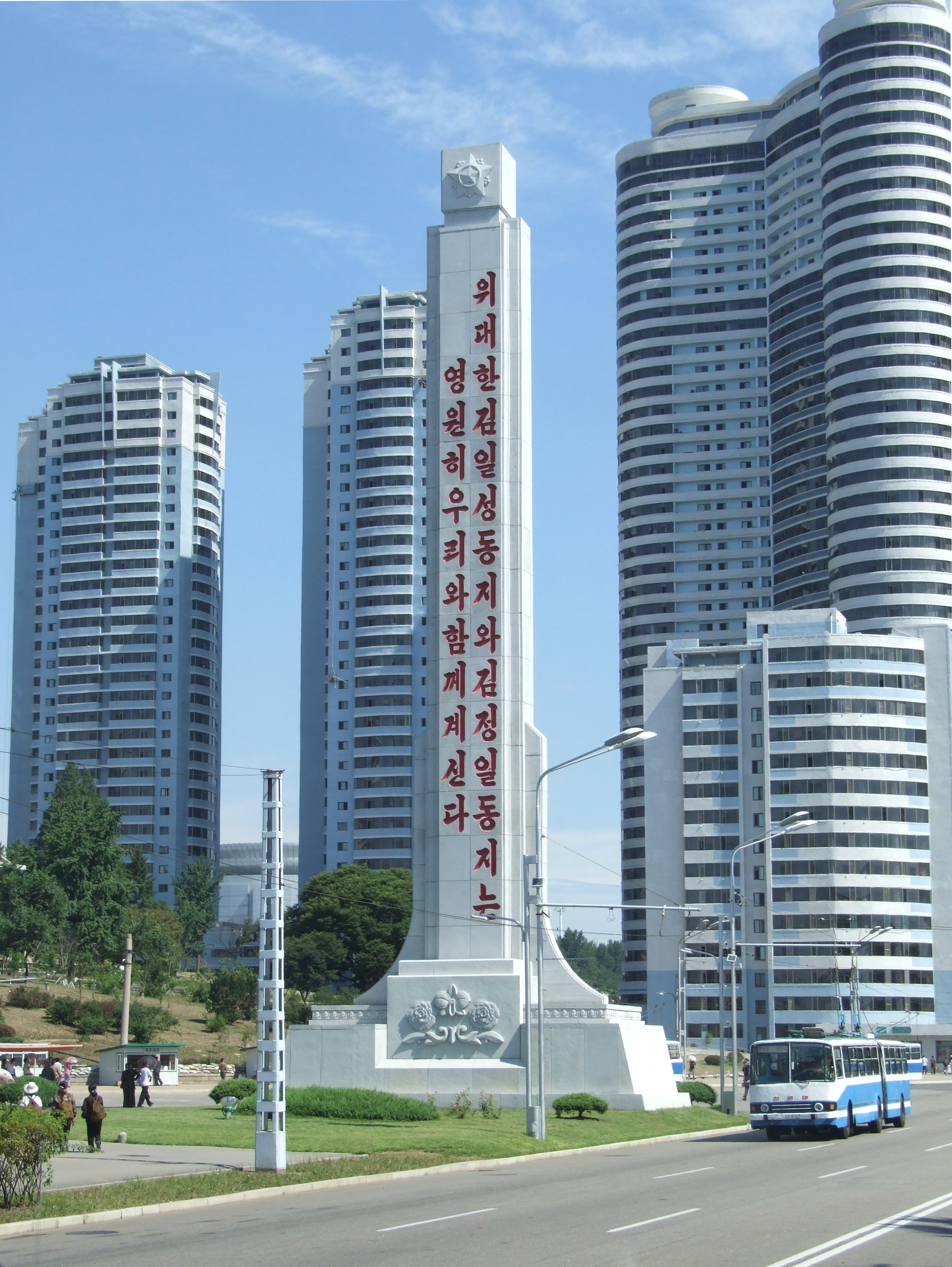
Immortality Tower, Sungri street in Pyongyang

Another well-known tower commemorating Kim Jong Il and Kim Il Sung stands in Pyongyang, on Sungri Street in Dong Jongro-dong. The tower is around 35 metres high. A commemorative inscription in red letters is engraved on the tower, which reads as follows:

"위대한 김일성동지와 김정일동지는 영원히 우리와 함께 계신다"
"The great presidents Kim Il Sung and Kim Jong Il will remain with us forever."
