= Kimjongilia (film) =

- Directed by: N.C. Heikin
- Written by: N.C. Heikin
- Release date: January 2009
- Running time: 75 minutes
- Country: United States

Kimjongilia (Korean: 김정일리아) is a documentary film directed by N.C. Heikin that tells the stories of North Korean prison camp survivors and escapees from the country. The film premiered at Sundance Film Festival in January 2009.

== Contents ==
Life in North Korea is examined through interviews with North Korean defectors. Included are stories from people who served time in North Korean prisons, former military officers, and artists, among others.

The title is a reference to a variety of flower named after North Korean leader Kim Jong-il.

== Reception ==
The film had only a limited theatrical run and received mixed reviews. Reviewers acknowledged the importance of Heikin's subject, but found her juxtaposition of shocking narratives with interpretive dances distracting.

Metacritic, gave the film a weighted average of 44/100, based on only four reviews. Rotten Tomatoes gave it a 60% rating out of 10 reviews.

== See also ==
- Kimjongilia
