= Kimilsungia =

Hybrid orchid named for Kim Il Sung

'Kimilsungia'
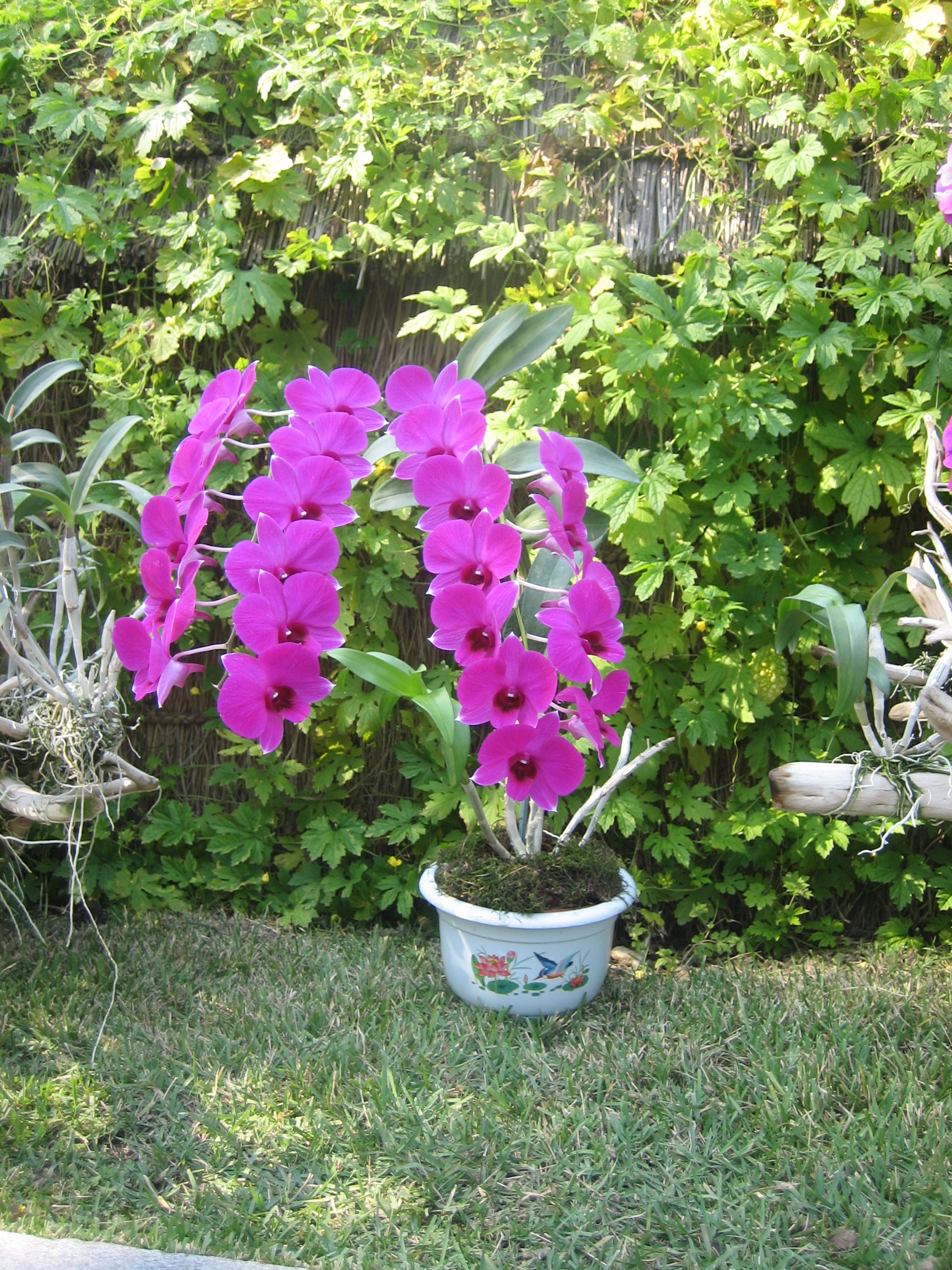
- Genus: Dendrobium
- Cultivar: Dendrobium Clara Bundt gx 'Kimilsungia'

- Kimilsungia
- Hangul: 김일성화
- Hanja: 金日成花
- RR: Gim Ilseonghwa
- MR: Kim Ilsŏnghwa

Kimilsungia is a hybrid orchid cultivar of the genus Dendrobium. It is a clone of a plant that was created in Indonesia by orchid breeder Carl Ludwig Bundt, who in 1964 registered the grex name Dendrobium Clara Bundt for all orchids of the same ancestry, naming it after his daughter. It has a complex ancestry from cultivated orchids. An attempt was made to register the grex name Dendrobium Kimilsungia, but this is not valid, it is a later synonym of Dendrobium Clara Bundt. As a cultivar name (applying to only part of the grex), the correct name is Dendrobium Clara Bundt 'Kimilsungia'. Another grex name Dendrobium Kimilsung Flower refers to plants of related but different ancestry.

Another flower, the Kimjongilia, is named after Kim Il Sung's son, Kim Jong Il. Neither the Kimilsungia nor the Kimjongilia are the national flower of North Korea. The national flower of the country is the Magnolia sieboldii with white flowers. The Kimilsungia violet orchid has become an integral part of the ever-present state-sponsored propaganda that surrounds the late leader.

According to the Korean Central News Agency, Kim Il Sung's "peerless character" is "fully reflected in the immortal flower" which is "blooming everywhere on the five continents".

== Description ==
The plant grows 30 to 70 centimetres (12–28 in) high. Its leaves adhere to the nodes alternatively and each stalk yields 3–15 flowers. The flowers have three petals and three calyxes and measure 6 to 8 centimetres (2.4–3.1 in). It blooms for 60–90 days. It grows best in daylight temperatures of 25 to 30 °C (77 to 86 °F) and 18 to 23 °C (64 to 73 °F) at night.

== History ==
During President Kim Il Sung's visit to Indonesia in 1965, Presidents Sukarno and Kim were touring the Bogor Botanical Gardens when the latter was smitten by an orchid specifically cultivated to bloom during his visit. This orchid was developed in the Bundt family's orchid nursery in Makassar by C.L. Bundt, an Indonesian orchid breeder of German-Moluccan descent, who suggested it to Sudjana Kasan, the director of Bogor Botanical Garden, after he had asked Bundt for assistance in getting ready for Kim's visit. President Sukarno, seeing Kim's enthusiasm, proposed that the flower be named Kimilsungia, as a symbol of eternal friendship between the two countries. Reportedly, Kim Il Sung initially declined the offer, but upon Sukarno's insistence he had to accept.

In North Korea, the flower was successfully cultivated in April 1975, in time for Kim Il Sung's birthday, and subsequently introduced to the North Korean populace for the first time in April 1977, for Kim Il Sung's 65th birthday. The violet Kimilsungia orchid has since become a symbol of the late Juche leader, being used in floral arrangements representing the North Korean state.

== Annual festivals ==
The annual Kimilsungia Festival has been held since 1998, and is held around the Day of the Sun. Kimilsungia flower shows are held every year in Pyongyang. Traditionally, embassies of foreign countries in North Korea each present their own bouquet of the flower to the annual exhibition.

== See also ==
- Kimjongilia
