= Kimjongilia =

Cultivar of begonia, named for Kim Jong Il

Begonia 'Kimjongilhwa'
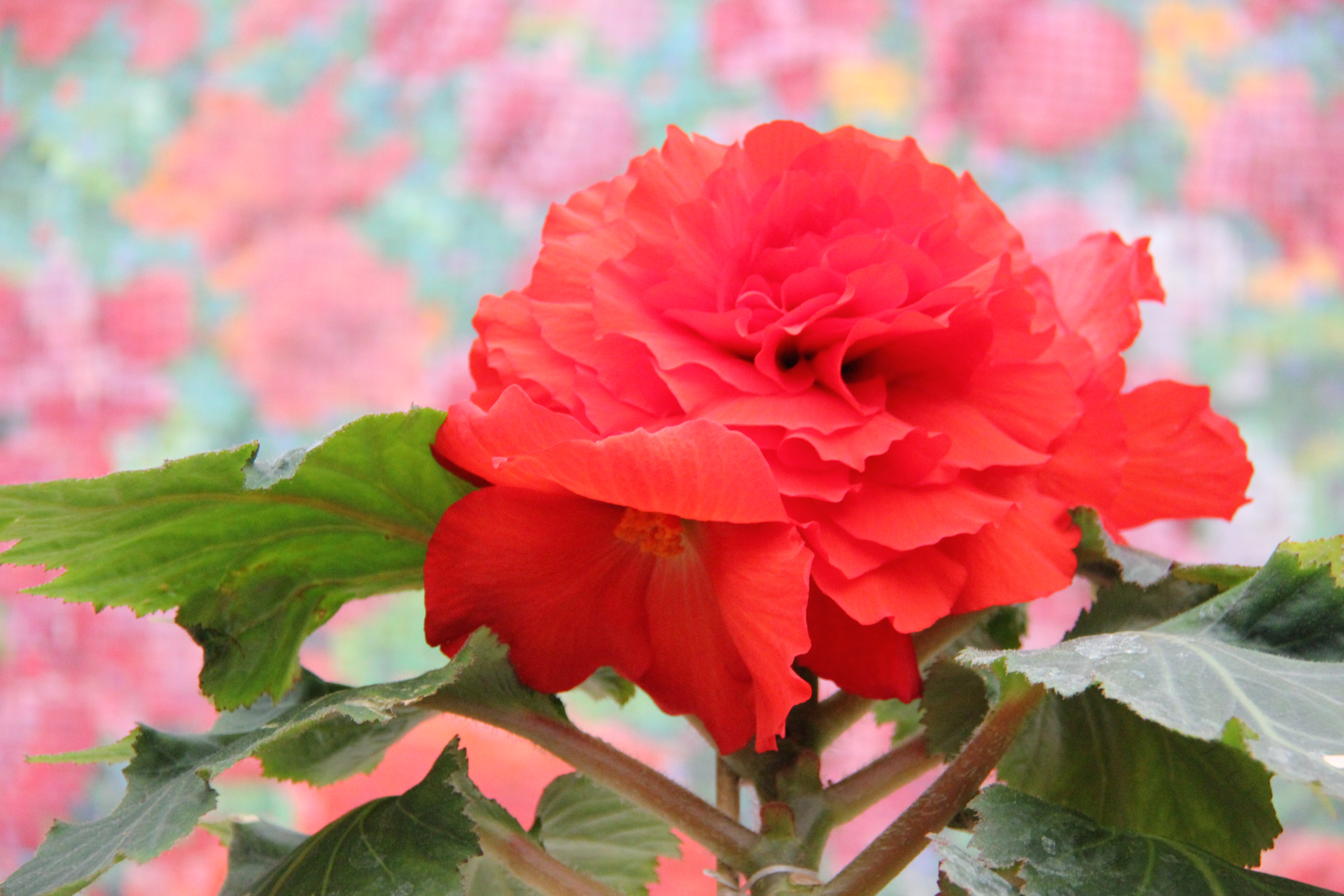
- Genus: Begonia
- Cultivar group: Tuberhybrida Group
- Cultivar: 'Kimjongilhwa'

- Kimjongilia
- Hangul: 김정일화
- Hanja: 金正日花
- RR: Gim Jeongilhwa
- MR: Kim Chŏngirhwa

Kimjongilia is a flower named after the former North Korean leader Kim Jong Il. It is a hybrid cultivar of tuberous begonia, registered as Begonia × tuberhybrida 'Kimjongilhwa'. When Kim Jong Il died in December 2011, the flower was used to adorn his body for public display. Despite its name, the Kimjongilia is not the official national flower of North Korea, which is the Magnolia sieboldii. Another flower, Kimilsungia, is an orchid cultivar named after Kim Jong Il's father and predecessor, Kim Il Sung.

== History ==
To commemorate Kim Jong Il's 46th birthday in 1988, Japanese botanist Kamo Mototeru cultivated a new perennial begonia named "kimjongilia" (literally, "flower of Kim Jong Il"), representing the Juche revolutionary cause of the Dear Leader. It was presented as a "token of friendship between Korea and Japan". The flower symbolizes wisdom, love, justice and peace. It is designed to bloom every year on Kim Jong Il's birthday, February 16.

== Bloom ==
The flower has been cultivated to bloom around the Day of the Shining Star, Kim Jong Il's birthday, 16 February. According to the Korean Central News Agency, a preservation agent had been developed that would allow the flower to keep in bloom for longer periods of time.

== Song ==
A song composed by several North Korean composers, also called "Kimjongilia", was written about the flower:

The red flowers that are blossoming over our land
Are like hearts: full of love for the leader
Our hearts follow the young buds of Kimjongilia
Oh! The flower of our loyalty!

== See also ==
- Kimilsungia
- Kimjongilia (film)
