= Pet culture =

Interaction of humans and pets

Pet culture refers to the culture revolving around the interaction of humans and pets.

== Pet culture in the United States ==
Modern-day Western society has integrated animals into everyday life. Today, American families increasingly include indoor, non-working companion animals under the "family" umbrella. Pets are often posted in photos and videos on owners' social media, with the relationship between sharing and watching generating increased interest in pet ownership. This increase has impacted cat and dog populations within broader society, especially from the mid-1960s onward in America. An average of 63% of American households have one pet, while 45% have multiple. The increased prevalence of pets has yielded greater demand on the American veterinarian supply.

Before the 1900s, pet ownership was restricted to upper social classes with the income to care for them. With modern-day technology and medicine, the average lifespan of pets has lengthened. Indoor cats, on average, live 13–14 years. Indoor dogs, on average, live 6–10 years. Pet-keeping can be cost-heavy. Throughout the life of an average pet in the United States, the owner may spend between $8,000 and $13,000. Pets may be kept for companionship or as working animals, among other reasons.

== Pets in the workplace ==
Pets have also gained more popularity in places of employment. Office pets are animals that live in or visit the workplace. Usually office pets belong to the company but may also be the personal pet of the CEO or owner, office manager, or another employee. In addition to office pets, there are also pet-friendly work environments, where employees can bring their pets from home to work with them.

The practice of having office pets and/or pet-friendly work environments has been known to occur in big businesses, medium-sized businesses, and small businesses. Reasons as to why a business would have an office pet include boosting employee morale, reducing stress and improving health, drawing in and recruiting new employees, improving communication and collaboration between coworkers, attracting customers and clients, and improving public relations between the business and the community. Additionally, business leaders have cited multiple advantages to having pet-friendly work environments such as improving company culture, boosting productivity, reducing employee turnover, boosting employer brand, improving employee satisfaction, boosting the mental and physical health of workers and giving employees more flexibility.

== Popular pets in the United States ==
=== Dogs ===
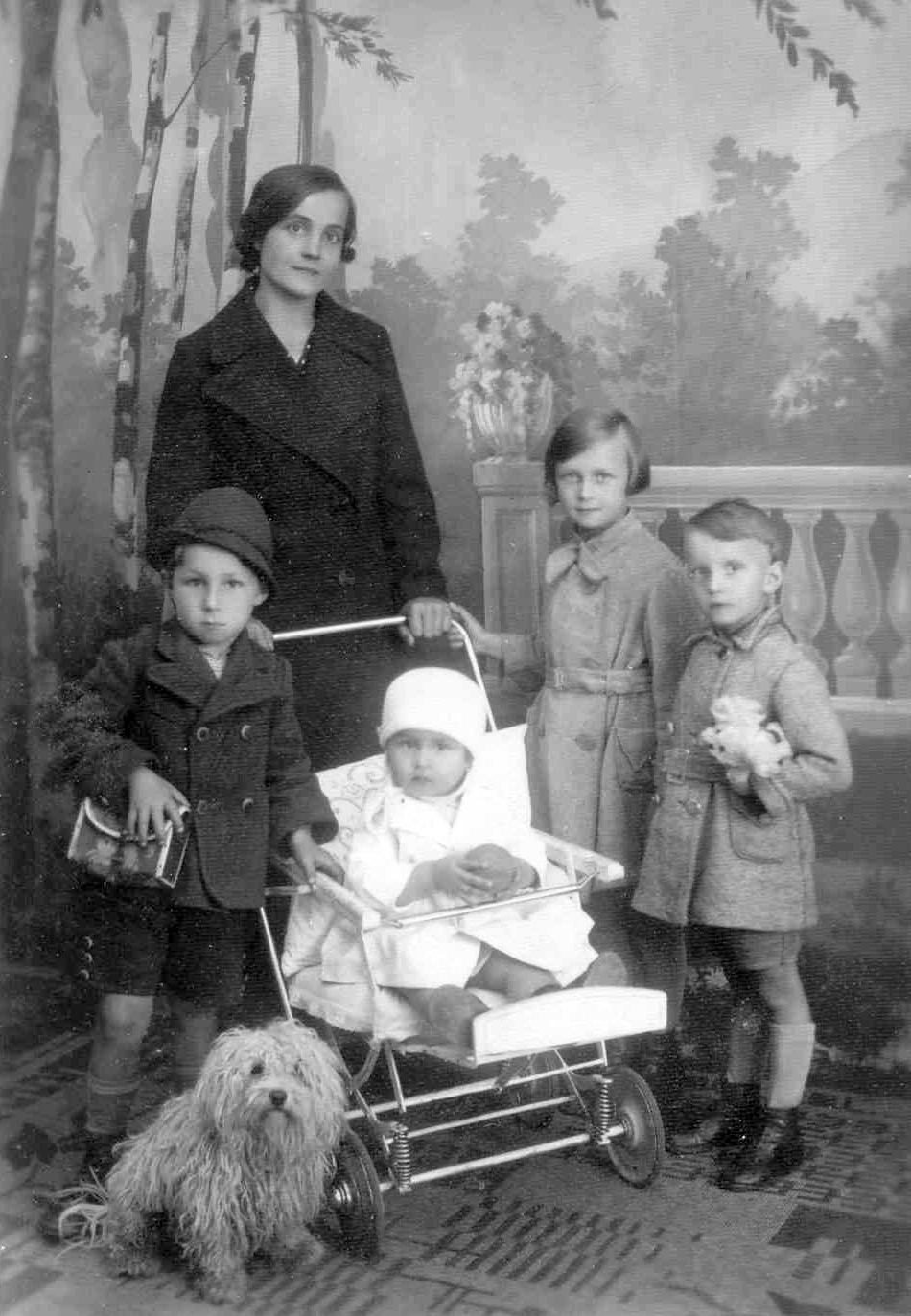
1936 family photograph. Some people consider their dog to be a part of their family.

In the United States, the estimate of households that have dogs as a pet is about 69 million. Dog ownership reportedly can improve mental illness, along with feelings of loneliness and distress. In the past, humans owned dogs for work purposes. Small dogs were used to scare off pests, while larger dogs were used for protection and identifying danger. Other important jobs that people have used dogs for include hunting for game, search and rescue for missing persons, herding of livestock, and serving as therapy dogs for people. Currently, however, most dogs serve as companions to their owners rather than being working animals.

=== Cats ===
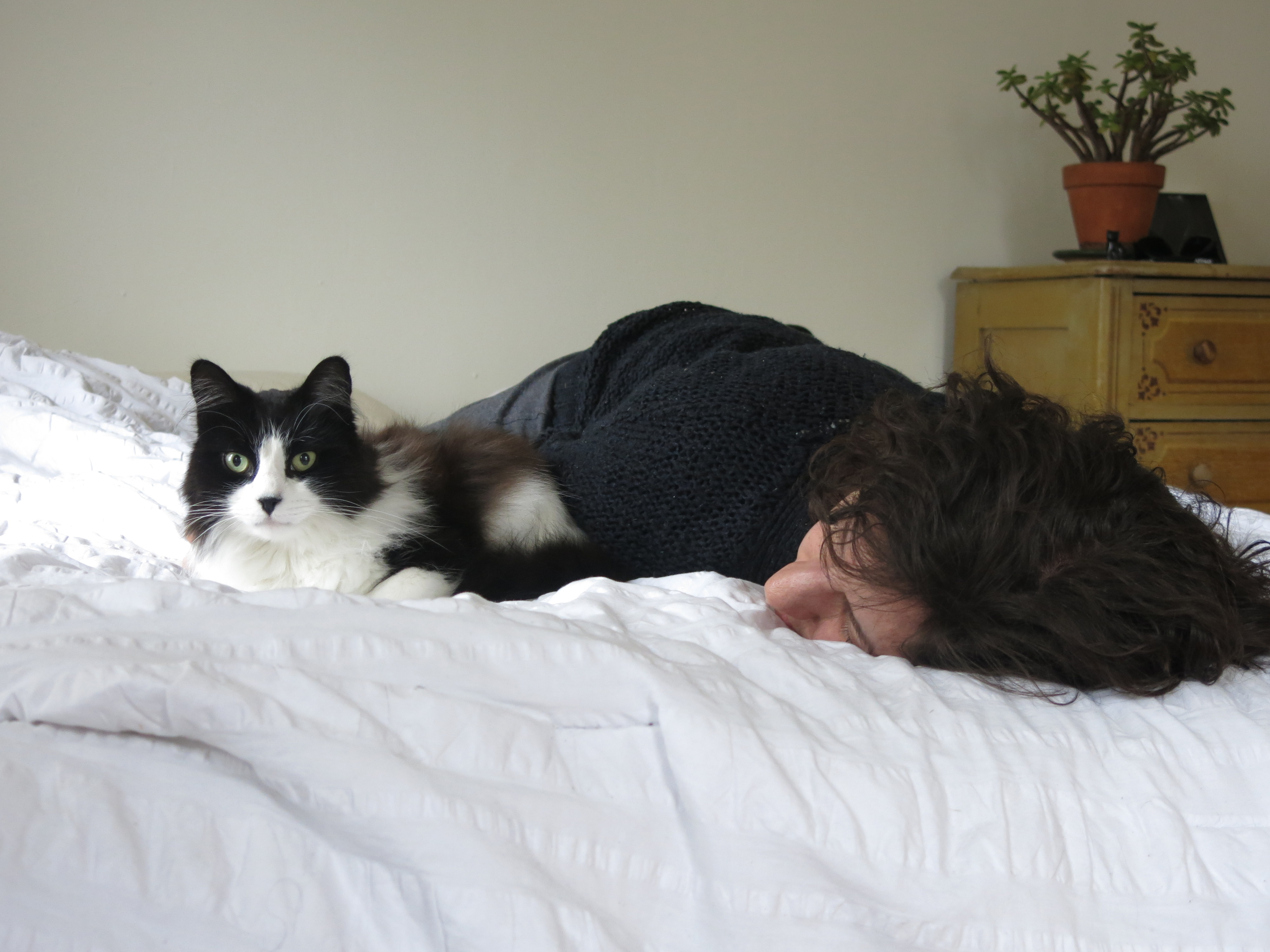
A cat lies in bed with its owner.

In the United States, there is an estimated 45.3 million households that own a cat. In the past, humans owned cats for work purposes. The most common job for cats was killing or scaring off vermin such as pigeons and rodents. Additionally, cats (particularly puppy cats) have also been used as protection animals for their owners. Another job cats have been known to perform for humans is serving as therapy cats for people. The breed of cat, its character, and its history impacts their behavior.

=== Rodents ===
In the United States, there is an estimated 5.3 million households that have rodents as pets. Rats have been used for work purposes such as bomb detection, laying computer link cables, or serving as therapy animals for people. In the past, rodents were considered vermin that spread disease and were a threat to crops. As a result, the practice of keeping small mammals as pets, is a relatively recent development, arising only after large-scale industrialization.

=== Birds ===
In the United States, an estimated 6 million households own birds. As with other domestic animals, birds have been used to perform roles and tasks such as delivering messages, pigeon racing, or falconry. Usually, ownership of birds requires an enclosure (such as a birdcages) or a tether (such as a jess) to keep the birds from getting loose.

=== Fishes ===
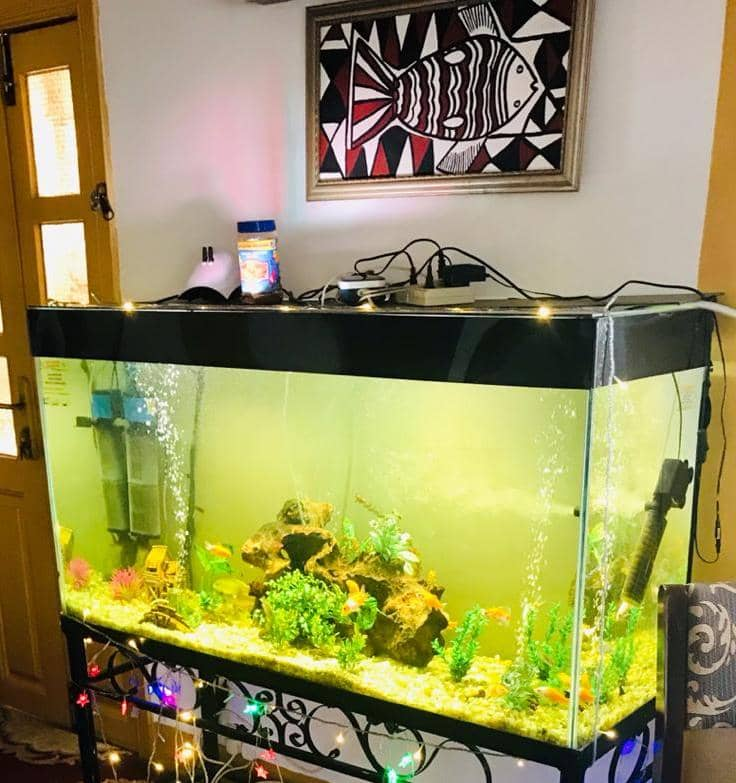
Aquarium that houses exotic pet fishes

In the United States, an estimated 11.8 million households own a fish. People that rent living spaces sometimes cannot own dogs or cats due to their lease containing rules against pets or their lease requiring a monthly fee be paid (known also as "pet rent") in order to have an animal. Thus, fish ownership is popular among those who live in rented spaces, since most leases allow fish as pets. Fish ownership is also popular among those with health conditions and/or allergies that prevent them from owning dogs or cats. Owning a fish can include risk of bacterial infection, but this can be prevented with proper cleaning of aquariums and care of the fish. Those that do own a fish with an aquarium believe it has beneficial properties, such as relaxation and a distraction from everyday life.

== Social cost of pet owning ==
Pet owning in America may cause trouble to the public. Owners may have to face the consequences of pets that misbehave. It may result in pressure and distress to their owners and nearby neighbors. Each year in the United States alone, the Centers for Disease Control (CDC) found that an average of 4.5 million people are attacked by a dog. Within those attacks, around 900,000 of them are serious and need immediate attention. Many pets are also known to carry diseases. Dogs, one of the most common pets in America, are known to transmit rabies to humans primarily through biting. Cats are carriers of Toxoplasma gondii, a parasite that enters the brain and may cause toxoplasmosis. Pets are also known to cause people allergies. They could also trigger an asthma attack, for those who are allergic.

== See also ==
- Pet humanization
- Pet culture in Japan
- Pet culture in South Korea
- Pet culture in North Korea
- Pet industry
- Pet ownership among the homeless
- Self-domestication
- List of domesticated animals
- Backyard breeder
- Leash
- Animal training
- Animal-assisted therapy
- Classroom pet
- Pet-friendly hotels
- Pet-friendly dormitories
