= Pet culture in North Korea =

Aspect of North Korean culture

Pet culture in North Korea is a limited aspect of North Korean culture, where focus has predominantly been given to animal's practical purpose. A "pet culture" in the western sense is more pronounced in wealthy cities such as Pyongyang, where a pet industry has surged in recent years. Regardless, DPRK authorities criticize "decadent capitalist" practices, such as investing large amounts of money on pet grooming and food.

Dogs are the most prevalent pet animal in the country. Working and guard dogs are normally found in the countryside. The Pungsan dog is the DPRK's national breed. The consumption of dog meat is allowed, and even promoted by the government.

Cats, monkeys, bunnies and pigs are also kept as pets in the country, the latter two also serving as livestock.

== History ==
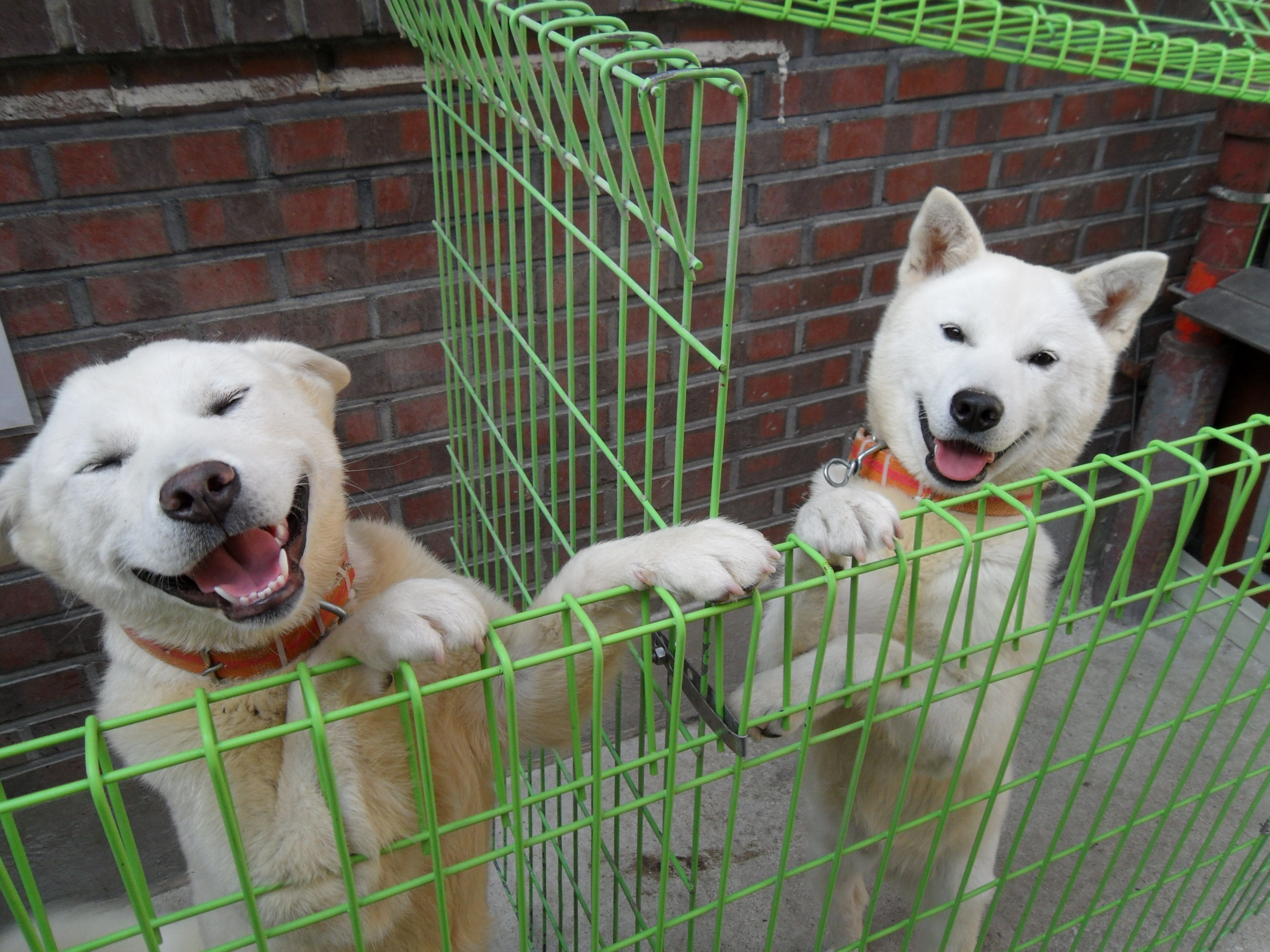
Pungsan dogs are the national breed of North Korea

North Korea has historically promoted dogs for practical purposes, such as the Pungsan dog, a traditional hunting breed. The DPRK government links the breed to the revolutionary struggle against Japan. In 1956, the breed was officially registered as "natural monument №.368" of North Korea, and strict guidelines were set regarding the breed. Pungsans are not normally kept as pets at home, but used for dog competitions, where "purity" of the breed is essential.

The nation's first leader, Kim Il Sung, is reported to having owned a pet dog.

His successor Kim Jong Il owned many pet dogs, donating 100 dogs of 33 breeds that he raised to Pyongyang Zoo. In 2011, South Korean MP Yoon Sang-hyun accused Kim of spending $200,000 feeding dozens of pet dogs, claiming he was "feeding dogs, not people".

=== 1970s - 1990s ===
From the 1970s, North Korea began featuring domestic cats in the country's official stamps, as well as various breeds of dogs.

A pet culture didn't begin to appear until the late 1980s, where the word "pet" entered the North Korean vocabulary. Exposure to outside culture, such as the 1989 World Festival of Youth and Students helped to popularize the idea. Widespread smuggling during the 1990s Ardous March also exposed North Koreans to foreign media featuring small dogs to be kept indoors, creating demand for such animals amongst the elite. Owning a pet dog became a symbol of wealth, and the pet culture spread amongst the general public.

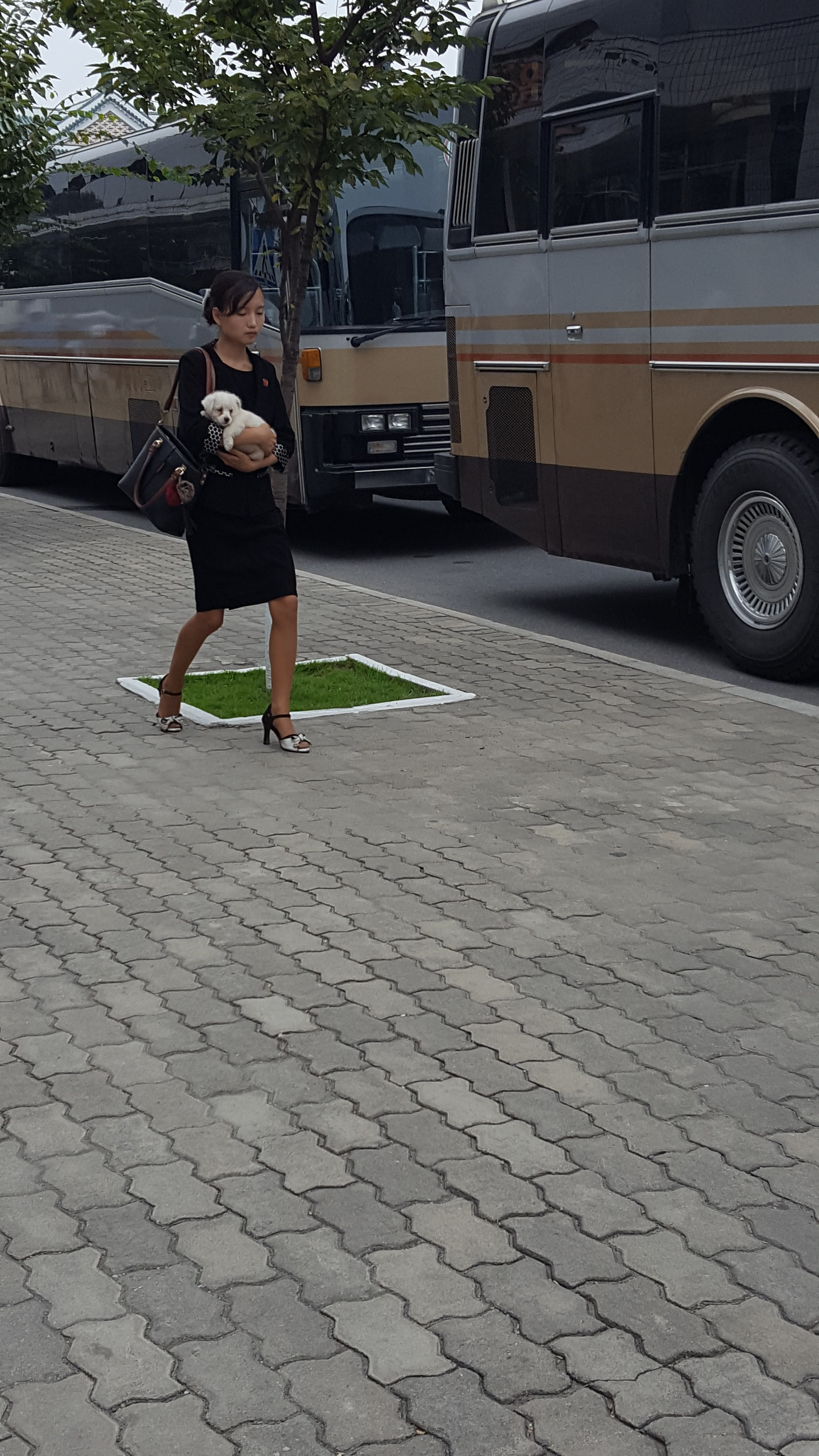
North Korean woman with pet dog in Pyongyang

Regardless, North Korean propaganda criticized pet culture, with the magazine Chollima mocking western pet practices in a 1992 issue, denouncing practices such as spending large amounts of money on dog food or grooming as symbols of the "ills of capitalism", and ridiculing reports of dogs in the western world inheriting fortunes.

=== 2000's - present day ===
In 2001, the same Chollima magazine published a dog-related article, claiming that the "dog is a friendly domestic animal that is helpful for people’s lives and emotions" and shared tips on raising dogs. A Choson Sinbo article of the same year credited changing attitudes towards pet dogs in Pyongyang to the 2000 inter-Korean summit, following which dogs became more common in the streets of the city and nine vet clinics were opened.

In 2014, leader Kim Jong Un officially declared the Pungsan dog as the DPRK's national dog.

The Socialist Women's Union of Korea's official publication Korean Women, featured the article “Choosing a pet dog” in its fifth edition in 2019.

A North Korean book exhibition in 2020 featured books with titles such as "How to Train Your Dog" and "101 Foods for Dog Training".

In 2025, South Korean outlet Daily NK reported that North Korea's pet industry has "taken off", following the opening of a pet shop in Pyongyang's Hwansong district, which was personally attended by Kim Jong Un, his wife Ri Sol-ju and daughter Kim Ju Ae. The report noted that the surge is fueled primarily by the capital's wealthy citizens who can afford to maintain such pets, with animals such as dogs, cats and parrots, as well as pet supplies, being imported in high numbers from neighbouring China.

== Pets in society ==
Keeping pets is not very popular in North Korea, primarily due to financial concerns. North Korea avoids the term "companion animal", which is used in South Korea. Most companion-type pets, such as small dogs and monkeys, dwell in Pyongyang, where citizens normally live in apartments.

Outside the capital, dogs are the most popular pet and mostly kept for practical purposes, with guard dogs and shepherd dogs being preferred. Cats are normally kept for catching mice. Rural North Koreans do not normally feed pet food to their animals, due to financial reasons.

=== Covid-19 pandemic ===
During the COVID-19 pandemic, South Korean outlet Daily NK reported that both pet and feral cats were being targets of "elimination campaigns" along the Chinese border, as authorities allegedly feared that the animals would carry the coronavirus.

Stories by it and fellow South Korean newspaper Chosun Ilbo also reported, citing anonymous sources, about the rounding up of pet dogs by the authorities for their meat and pelts amidst an economic crisis, with the ownership of dogs being called "decadent" and "non-socialist". These allegations about the rounding up of dogs were not confirmed by following stories.

== Dog meat ==
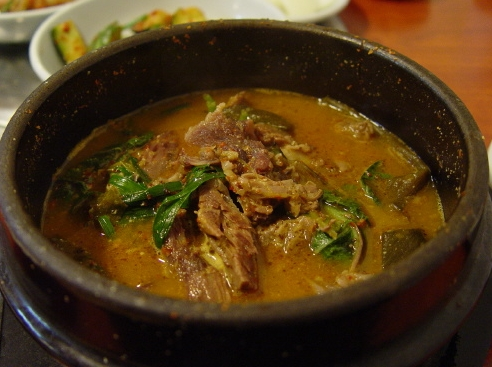
A bowl of dangogiguk ("sweet meat soup")

Dog meat is consumed as a delicacy in North Korea, where it is referred to as dangogi ("sweet meat"). Unlike South Korea, the practice is not only legal but officially endorsed by the government, with dangogiguk ("sweet meat soup" ) having been declared a "regional intangible cultural heritage" of the DPRK in 2022. A common tradition is to consume it at the height of the summer heat, as it is understood to cool the body's temperature.

Pyongyang hosts a specialized "sweet meat" restaurant, and organizes yearly cooking competitions. DPRK's Korean Central Television claimed that the 2025 edition of the competition drew around 200 local cooks.

== See also ==
- Pets in South Korea
