= Hypostomus luteus =

Conservation status
- Least Concern (IUCN 3.1)

Scientific classification
- Kingdom: Animalia
- Phylum: Chordata
- Class: Actinopterygii
- Order: Siluriformes
- Family: Loricariidae
- Subfamily: Hypostominae
- Tribe: Hypostomini
- Genus: Hypostomus
- Species: H. luteus

Binomial name
- Hypostomus luteus (Godoy, 1980)

Synonyms
- Plecostomus luteus Godoy, 1980

Species of fish

Hypostomus luteus, also known in the pet trade as the golden sailfin pleco, is an armored catfish in the genus Hypostomus of the family Loricariidae. The species experiences a notable three–phase shift in its coloration as it ages. It grows to a maximum size of 45 cm (18 in).

It is found in Northern Argentina in Rio Uruguay. It lives in fast-flowing waters where it mostly feeds on algae.

== Description ==
Hypostomus Luteus goes through a significant change in color as it ages. In its first phase it has a dark brown to black body with yellow speckles all over its body. The fins are yellow. In the second phase the body gets a mix of yellow and black. The speckles fade away and the yellow starts to cover the whole body. In the third phase the entire body is gold. Not all Hypostomus Luteus reach full gold coloration and some specimens even start losing gold coloration after reaching the third phase.

== Distribution and habitat ==
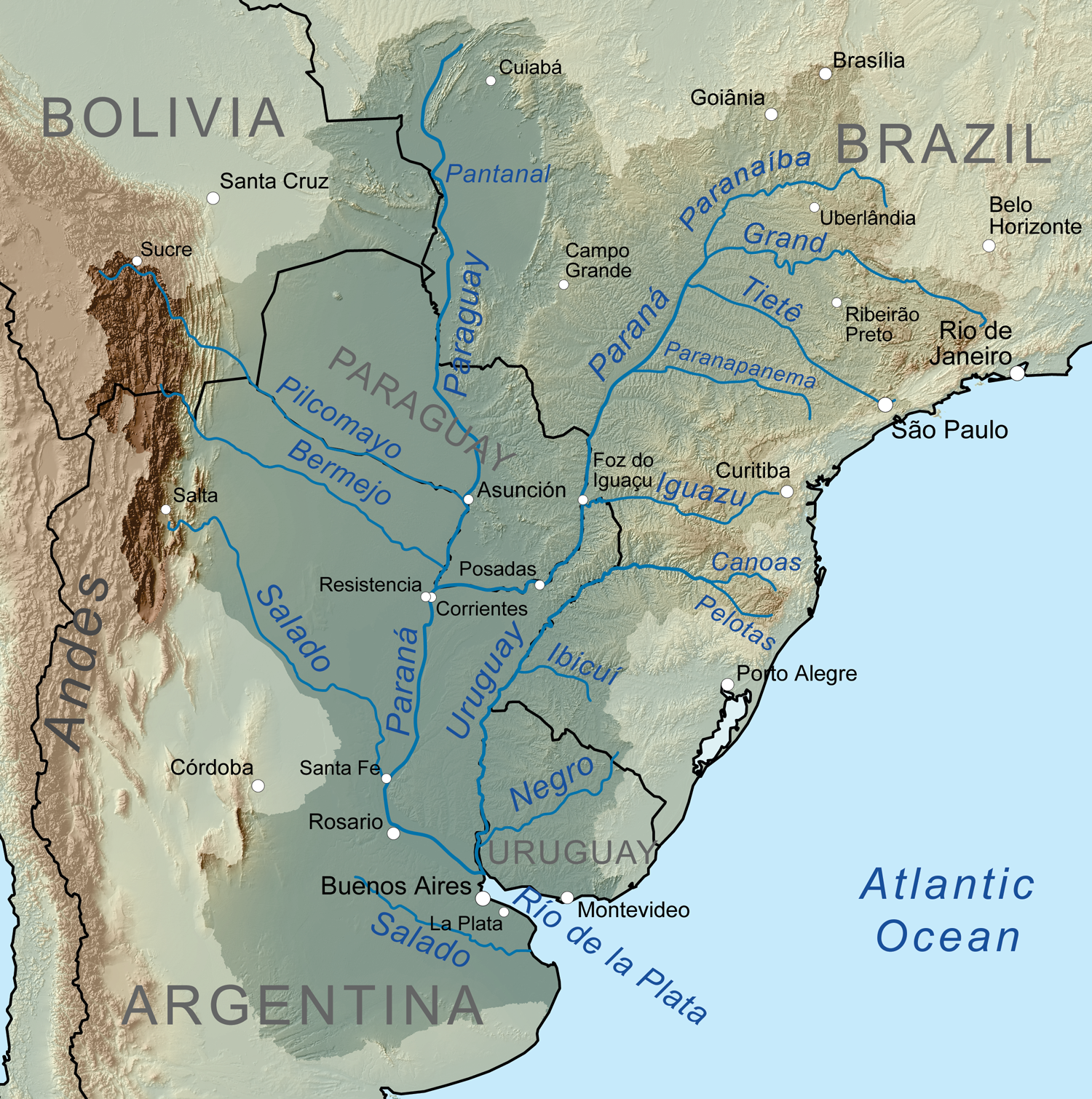
Map of the Rio de la Plata Basin showing the Rio Uruguay and its tributaries where the species is found

The species is primarily found in the upper basin of the Rio Uruguay, an area roughly covering Uruguay and the surrounding regions of Brazil and Argentina. Tributaries of the Rio Uruguay that the species inhabits include the Rio Canoas and the Rio Pelotas.

== In the pet trade ==
Although the species has been bred in captivity, most specimens sold in the pet trade are wild caught. Hobbyists keep them in ponds or aquariums, and the fish has become increasingly popular among experienced hobbyists in recent years. Because most specimens are wild-caught, the species is among the most expensive Loricariidae species, with third–phase specimens being sold for upwards of 1000 USD.

In the aquarium

Unlike most Loricariidae fish, Hypostomus Luteus should be kept in generally cooler waters of around 19–24 degrees Celsius or 67–75 degrees Fahrenheit. This is due to their native habitat, Rio Uruguay, having generally milder waters in comparison to the habitats of other Loricariidae species which are usually farther north.
