= North Korean =

North Korean may refer to:

- Something of, from, or related to the country of North Korea
- A Korean from North Korea, or of North Korean descent. For information about the North Korean people, see Demographics of North Korea and Culture of North Korea
- The Korean language as spoken in North Korea, including a number of Korean dialects
