= Culture of North Korea =

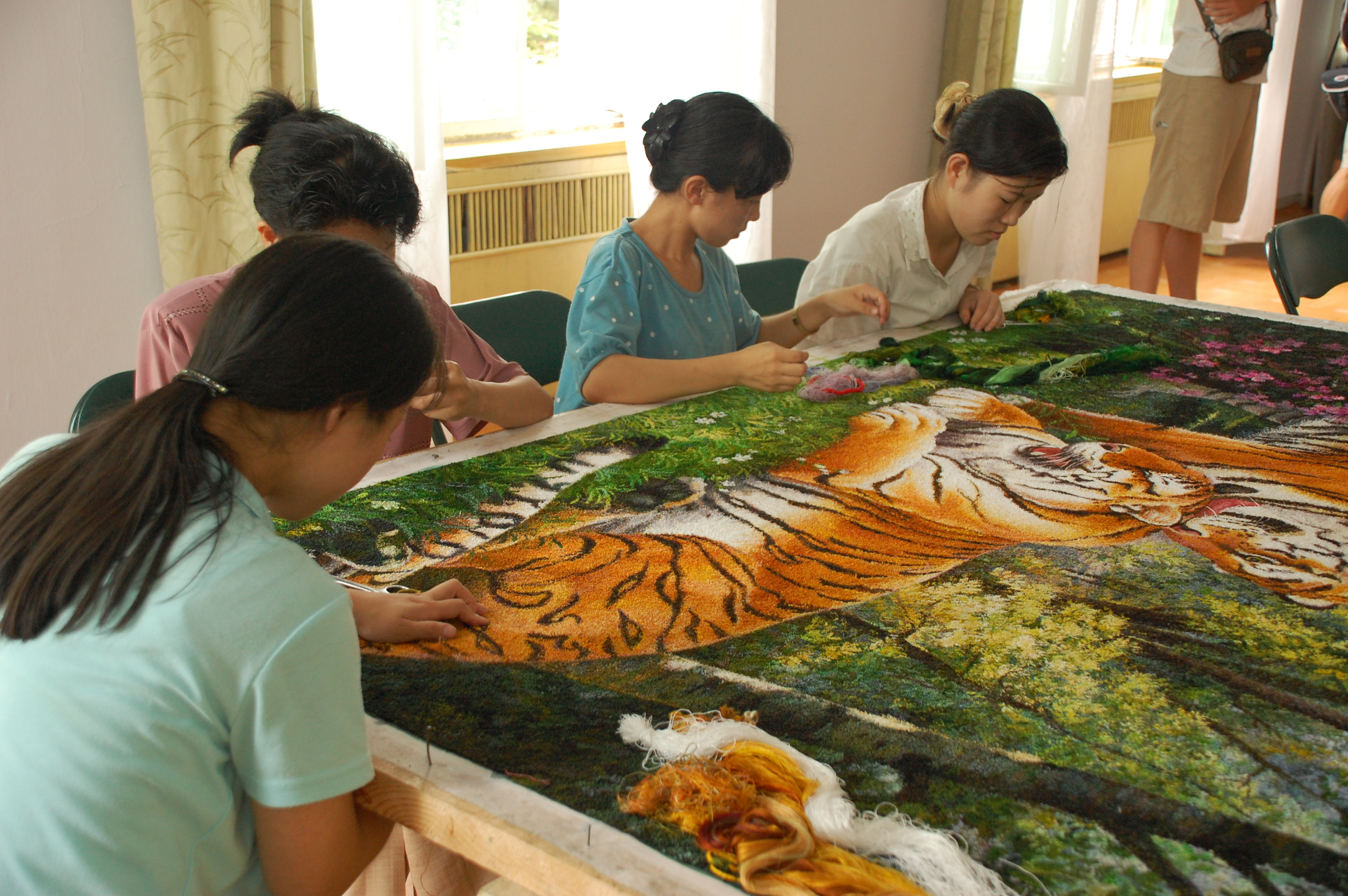
At the Pyongyang Embroidery Institute

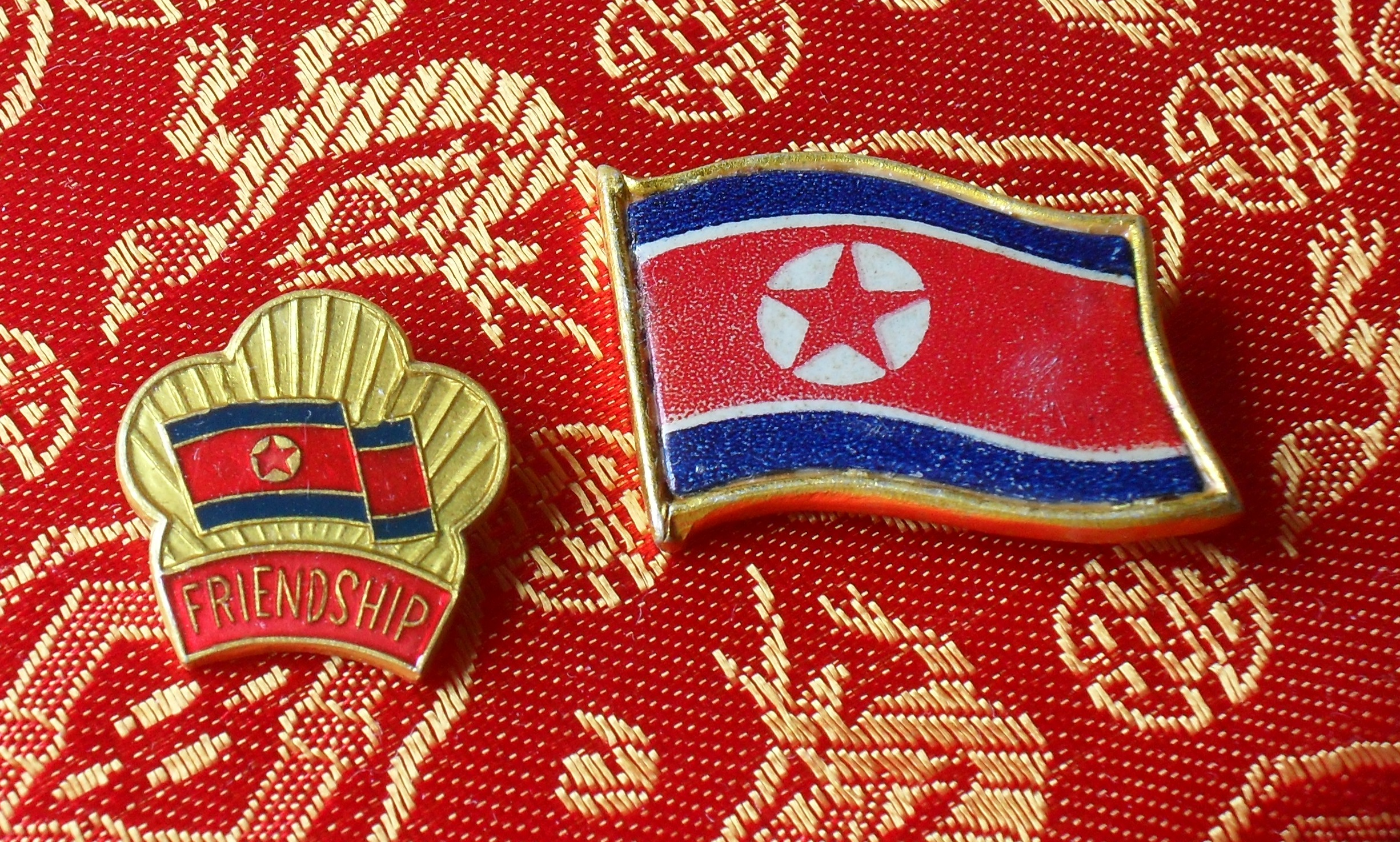
Lapel pins from North Korea

The contemporary culture of North Korea is based on traditional Korean culture, but has developed since the division of Korea in 1945. Juche, officially the Juche idea, is the state ideology of North Korea. Juche displays North Korea's cultural distinctiveness as it is the origin and sole adopter of the ideology.

Art in North Korea is primarily didactic, where cultural expression serves as an instrument for inculcating Juche ideology and the need to continue the struggle for revolution and reunification of the Korean Peninsula. Foreign governments and citizens (chiefly those aligned with the western world) are depicted negatively as imperialists; while revolutionary heroes and heroines are seen as saintly figures who act from pure motives. The three most consistent themes are martyrdom during the revolutionary struggle (depicted in literature such as The Sea of Blood), the happiness of the present society, and the genius of the leader.

Kim Il Sung has been described as a writer of "classical masterpieces" during the anti-Japanese struggle. Novels created under his direction include The Flower Girl, The Sea of Blood, The Fate of a Self-Defense Corps Man, and The Song of Korea; these are considered "prototypes and models of Juche literature and art." A 1992 newspaper report describes Kim in semi-retirement as writing his memoirs—"a heroic epic dedicated to the freedom and happiness of the people."

Due to North Korean isolationism, the general population has little to no exposure to foreign cultural influences apart from performances by song-and-dance groups and other entertainers brought in periodically for limited audiences. These performances, such as the Spring Friendship Art Festival held annually in April, are designed to show that the peoples of the world, like the North Koreans themselves, love and respect the country's leader. During the 1980s and the early 1990s, the North Korean media credits Kim Jong Il for making the country a "kingdom of art." The North Korean media claims Kim Jong Il is supposedly responsible for cultural policy.

Pyongyang and other large cities offer the broadest selection of cultural expression. "Art propaganda squads" travel to production sites in the provinces to perform poetry readings, one-act plays, and songs in order to "congratulate workers on their successes" and "inspire them to greater successes through their artistic agitation." Such squads are prominent in the countryside during the harvest season and whenever "speed battles" to increase productivity are held.

== Guidance and control ==
The state and the Workers' Party of Korea (WPK) control the production of literature and art. In the early 1990s, there was no evidence of any underground anti-regime literary or cultural movements such as the samizdat in the Soviet Union or those that exist in the People's Republic of China. The party exercises control over culture through its Propaganda and Agitation Department and the Culture and Arts Department of the WPK's Central Committee. The WPK's General Federation of Korean Literature and Arts Unions, the parent body for all literary and artistic organizations, also directs cultural activity. Due to widespread media control, some analysts have characterized North Koreans as censorees. These media of paintings, songs, movies, and mass games tell the story of Kim Il Sung as the father of the nation and provides guidance on how to behave as "model citizens" of North Korea.

== Cultural expression ==
The general theme of cultural expression is to take the best aspects from the past while discarding capitalistic elements. Popular vernacular styles and themes in literature, art, music, and dance are esteemed as they are seen as expressing the unique spirit of the Korean nation. Ethnographers restore and reintroduce cultural forms that have a proletarian or folk spirit and that encourages the development of a collective consciousness. Lively, optimistic musical and choreographic expressions are emphasized. Group folk dances and choral singing are traditionally practiced in some but not all parts of Korea and were being promoted throughout North Korea in the early 1990s among school and university students. Farmers' musical bands have also been revived.

== Literature, music, and film ==
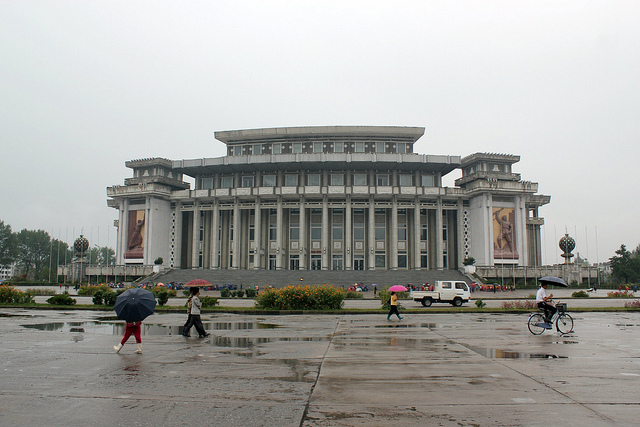
The Hamhŭng Grand Theatre, one of the biggest in North Korea, was completed in 1984 in the city of Hamhŭng.

Literature is dominated by political themes. A series of historical novels—Pulmyouui yoksa (Immortal History)— depict the heroism and tragedy of the pre-liberation era. The Korean War is the key theme of Korea Fights and The Burning Island. Since the late 1970s, five "great revolutionary plays" have been promoted as models of the party's literature: The Shrine for a Tutelary Deity; a theatrical rendition of The Flower Girl; Three Men, One Party; A Letter from a Daughter; and Hyolbun mangukhoe (Resentment at the World Conference).

Korean revolutionary opera, derived from traditional Korean operas, known as ch'angguk, are often variations on Korean folk songs. Old fairy tales have also been changed to include revolutionary themes. As part of the party's policy of preserving the best from Korea's past, premodern vernacular works such as the Sasong kibong (Encounter of Four Persons) and the Ssangch'on kibong (Encounter at the Two Rivers) have been reprinted with edits to suit that purpose as well.

Musical compositions include the "Song of General Kim Il Sung", "Long Life and Good Health to the Leader", and "We Sing of His Benevolent Love"—hymns that praise the nation's leader. According to a North Korean writer, "Our musicians have pursued the party's policy of composing orchestral music based on famous songs and folk songs popular among our people and produced numerous instrumental pieces of a new type." This music includes a symphony based on the theme of The Sea of Blood, which has also been made into a revolutionary opera.

In February 2008, the New York Philharmonic Orchestra became the first U.S. orchestra to perform in North Korea, albeit for a handpicked "invited audience". The concert was broadcast on national television. The Christian rock band Casting Crowns played at the annual Spring Friendship Arts Festival in April 2007, held in Pyongyang.

Motion pictures are recognized as "the most powerful medium for educating the masses" and play a central role in social education. According to a North Korean source, "films for children contribute to the formation of the rising generation, with a view to creating a new kind of man, harmoniously evolved and equipped with well-founded knowledge and a sound mind in a sound body." One of the most influential films, An Jung-geun Shoots Ito Hirobumi, tells of the assassin who killed the Japanese resident-general in Korea in 1909. The protagonist is portrayed as a courageous patriot, but one whose efforts to liberate Korea were frustrated because the masses had not been united under "an outstanding leader [Kim Il Sung] who enunciates a correct guiding thought and scientific strategy and tactics." Folk tales such as "The Tale of Chun Hyang", about a nobleman who marries a servant girl, and "The Tale of On Dal" have also been made into films.

Kim Jong Il showed interest in or perhaps even obsession with cinema. The North Korean leader reportedly had a huge library of Western and Asian movies. In the 1980s, he even ordered the kidnapping of two South Korean movie-makers and forced them to make films for the North Korean state.

Australian filmmaker Anna Broinowski gained access to North Korea's film industry through British filmmaker Nick Bonner, who facilitated meetings between Broinowski and prominent North Korean filmmakers to assist Broinowski with the production of Aim High in Creation!, a film project based on Kim Jong Il's manifesto. Broinowski explained in July 2013, prior to the screening of the film at the Melbourne International Film Festival:

A friend gave me Kim Jong Il's manifesto on how to make the 'perfect socialist film', The Cinema and Directing (1987). I was immediately fascinated by his often counter-intuitive (for a Westerner at least) filmmaking rules. And I began to ponder: what would a film by Westerners, strictly adhering to Kim Jong Il's rules, be like? Could it have the same power over western audiences that North Korean films have over Kim Jong Il's 23 million citizens? ... I wanted to humanise the North Koreans in the minds of viewers constantly bombarded by the mainstream Western media's depiction of North Koreans as victimised, brainwashed automatons.

A version of Broinowski's work was screened in Pyongyang, but the director believes that the documentary version of the film will not be allowed into the country.

A study commissioned by the U. S. State Department shows that, despite extremely strict regulations and draconian penalties, North Koreans, particularly elite elements, have increased access to news and other media outside the state-controlled media authorized by the government. While access to the Internet is tightly controlled, listening to the radio and viewing DVDs is increasing, and receiving television broadcasts from neighboring states is also possible in border areas. A South Korean professor claimed that the spread of cheap, Chinese-made "portable TVs" (EVD players) in North Korea is making it harder for authorities to crack down on citizens watching South Korean-made videos. Uriminzokkiri is a Korean news website that frequently posts propaganda including the United States attack video published in 2013.

== Visual arts ==
Historically, graphic design in North Korea was influenced by the Soviet bloc and by Korean tradition. It has tended to use a "Korean palette" of bright colours.

== Architecture and city planning ==
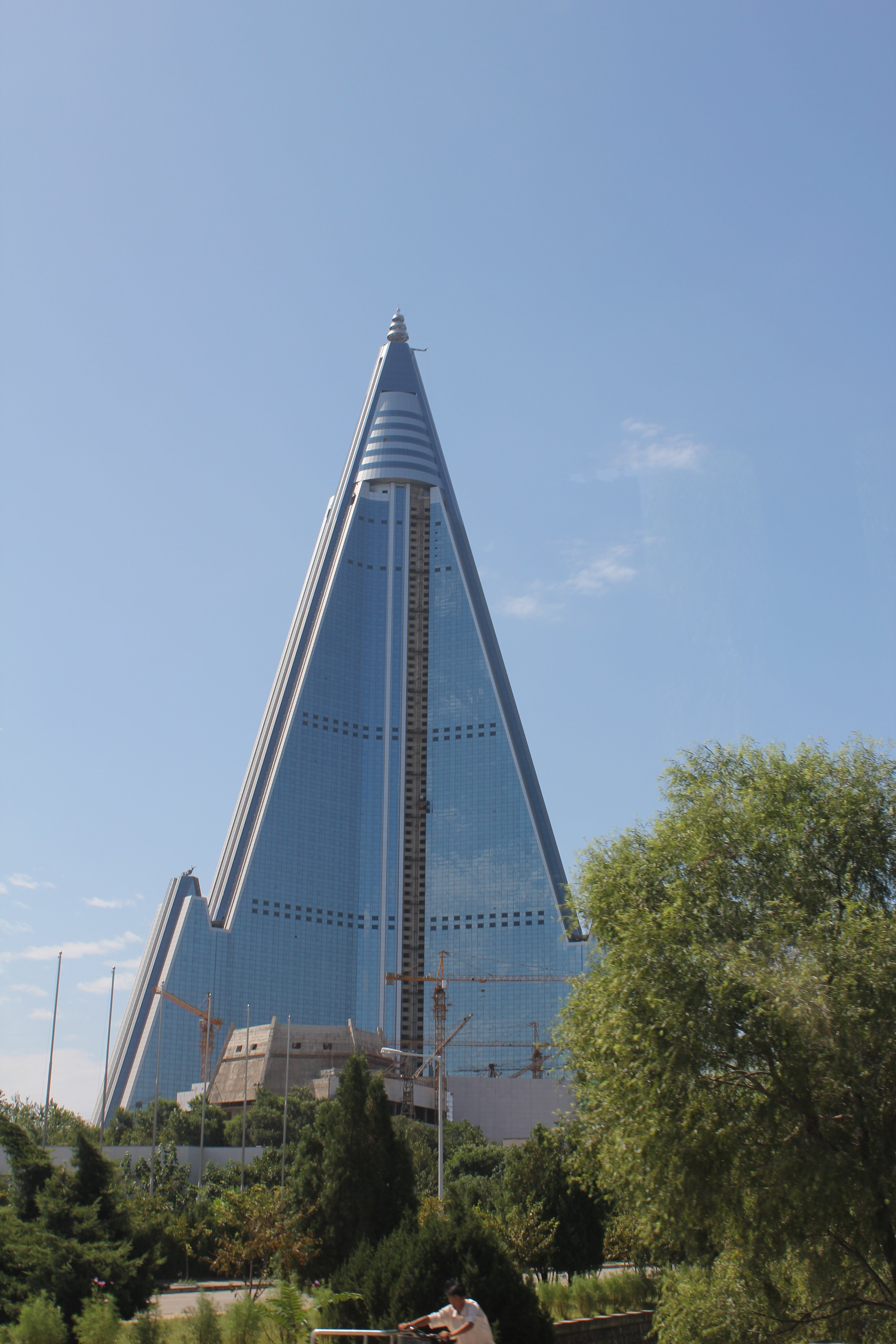
The incomplete Ryugyong Hotel in 2011.

The most distinct form of contemporary cultural expression in North Korea is architecture and city planning. Pyongyang, almost completely destroyed by the United States during the Korean War, has been rebuilt on a grand scale. A number of new buildings have been constructed during the 1980s and 1990s in order to enhance Pyongyang's status as a capital.

Major structures are divided architecturally into three categories: monuments, buildings that combine traditional Korean architectural motifs and modern construction, and high-rise buildings of a modern design. Examples of the first include the Ch'ollima Statue; a twenty-meter high bronze statue of Kim Il Sung in front of the Museum of the Korean Revolution (itself, at 240,000 square meters, one of the largest structures in the world); the Arch of Triumph (similar to its Parisian counterpart, although a full ten meters higher); and Juche Tower, 170 meters high, built on the occasion of Kim's seventieth birthday in 1982.

The second architectural category makes special use of traditional tiled roof designs and includes the People's Palace of Culture and the Grand People's Study House, both in Pyongyang, and the International Friendship Exhibition Hall at Myohyang-san. The latter building displays gifts given to Kim Il Sung by foreign dignitaries. In light of North Korea's current close relationship to China, and during the Joseon period, it is significant that the section of the hall devoted to gifts from China is the largest.

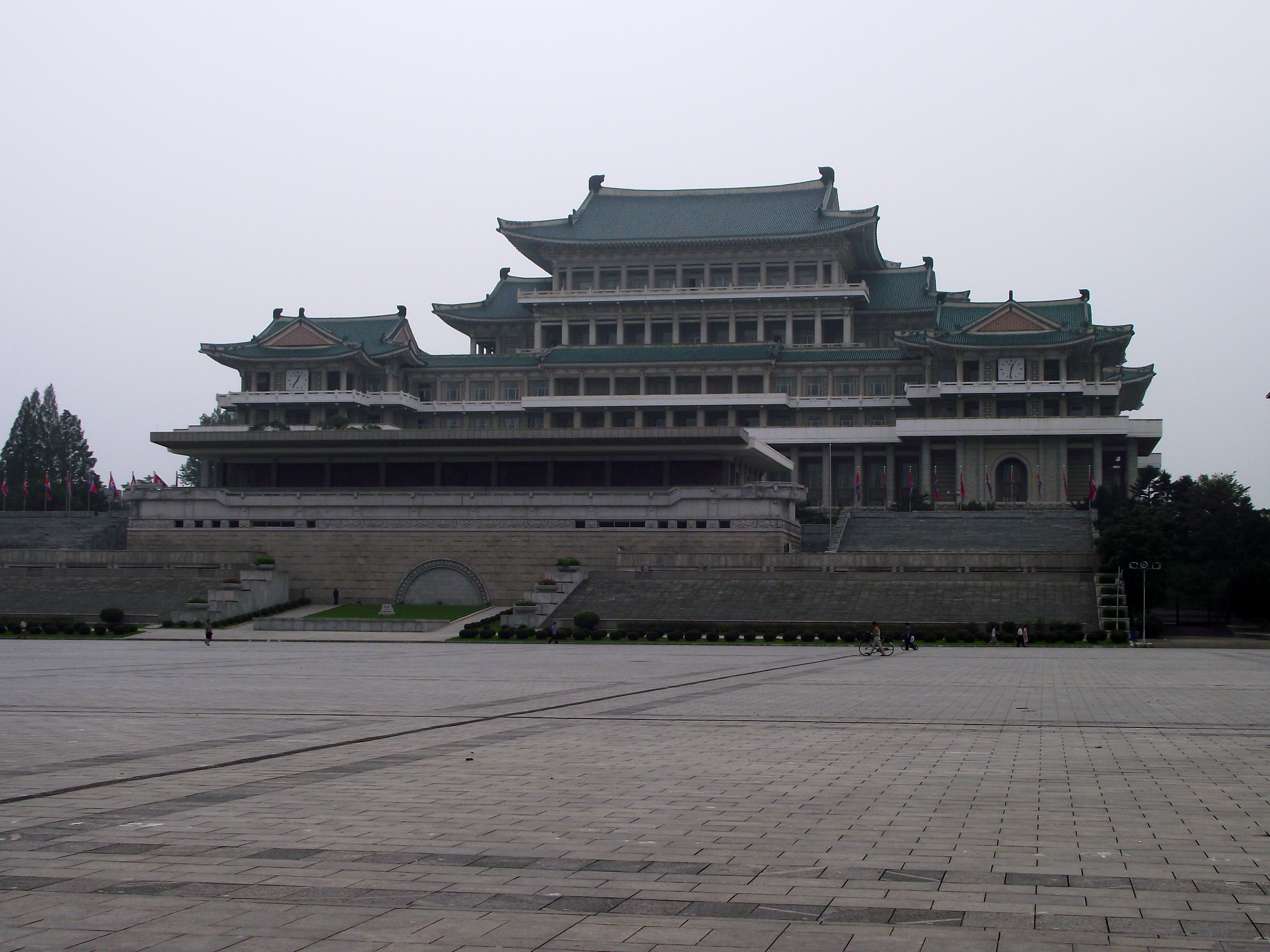
Grand People's Study House

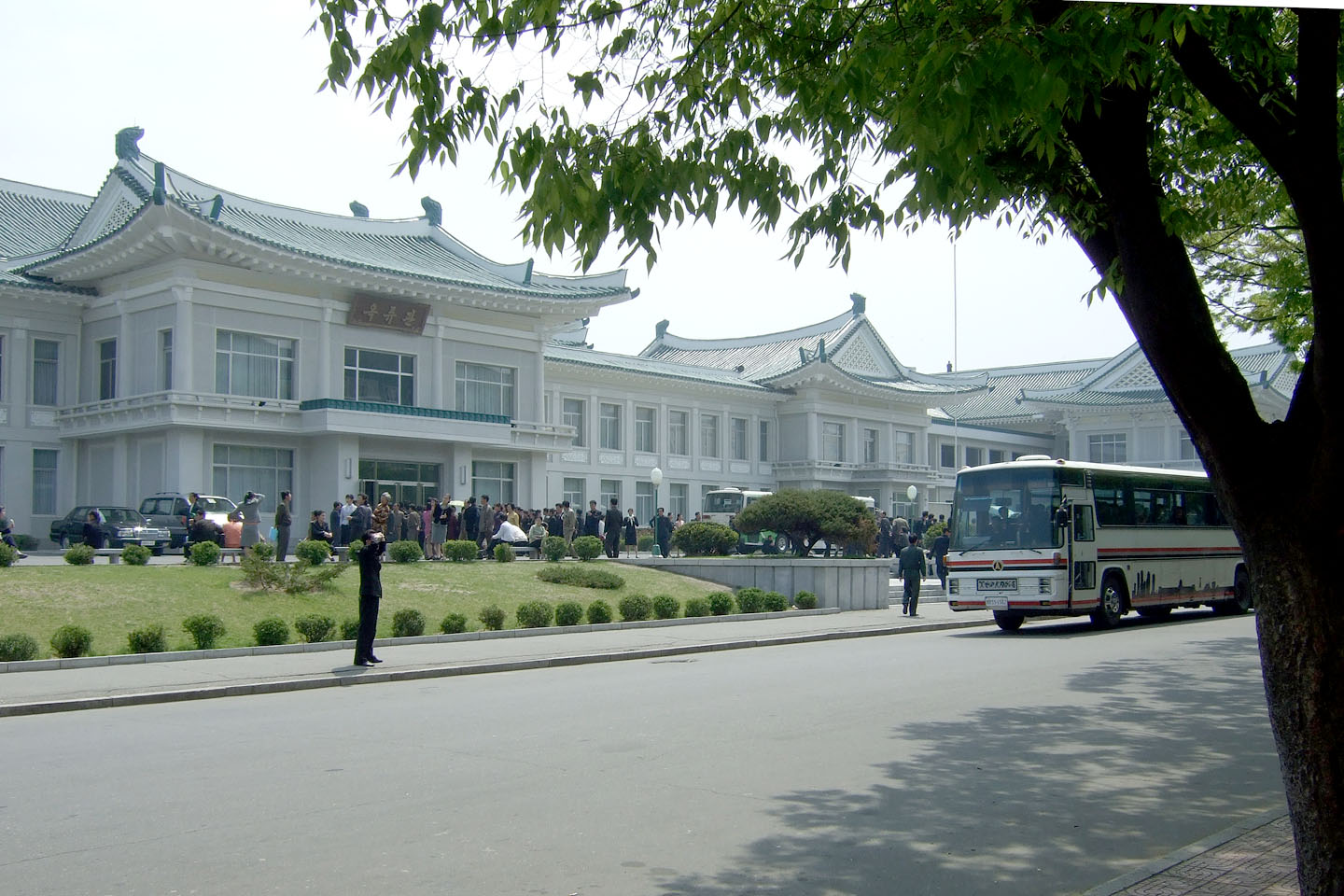
Okryu-gwan

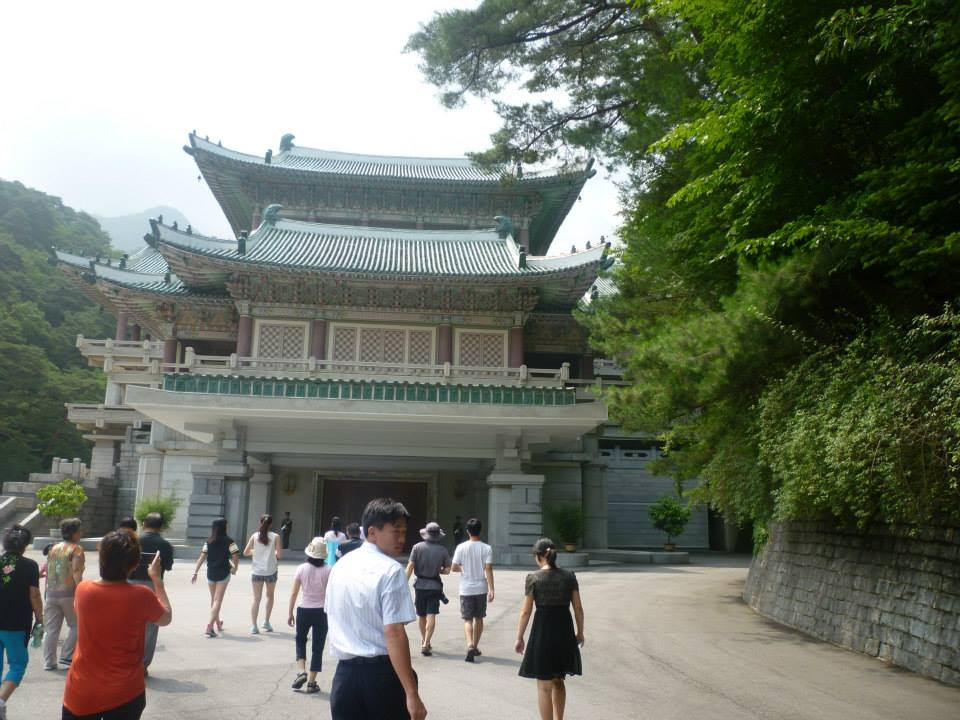
International Friendship Exhibition

The third architectural category includes high-rise apartment complexes, including Harmonica houses, and hotels in the capital. The most striking of these buildings is the Ryugyong Hotel, unfinished as of now (with construction halted from 1992 to April 2008). Described as one of the world's tallest hotels at 105 stories, its triangular shape looms over north-central Pyongyang. The Koryo Hotel is an ultramodern, twin-towered structure forty-five stories high.

Much construction occurred before celebrations of Kim Il Sung's eightieth birthday, including the building of grand apartment complexes and the Reunification Highway, a four-lane road connecting the capital and the Demilitarized Zone. According to a journalist writing in the Far Eastern Economic Review, the highway is "an impressive piece of engineering" that "cuts a straight path through mountainous terrain with 21 tunnels and 23 bridges on the 168 kilometers route to P'anmunjm." As in multiple other construction projects, the military provided the labor.

== Mass games ==
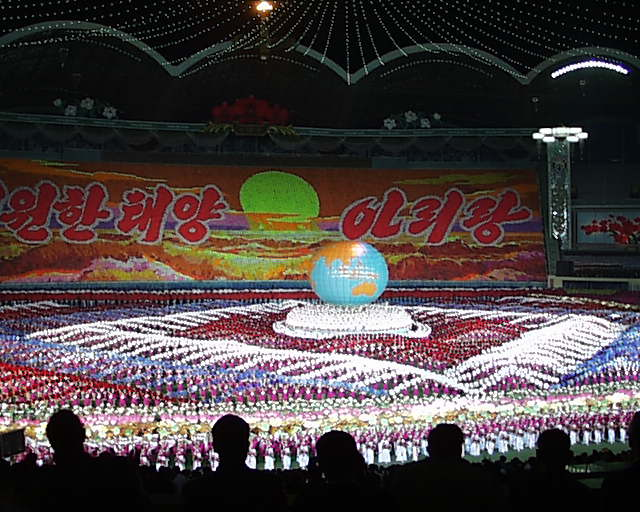
Arirang Festival mass games display in Pyongyang.

North Korea is famous for its "mass games". Mass games are the culminating annual celebrations of the state leader's birthdays and the rituals commemorating the foundation of the state: On the birthdays of Kim Il Sung (15 April 1912), the founding father of North Korea, and Kim Jong Il (born 16 February 1942), the former leader of the state. These are exhibitions where thousands of North Koreans perform highly choreographed dances, especially traditional dances, and gymnastics, often engaging in simultaneous rhythms of movement. The performers sing and chant their loyalties to Kim Il Sung, the KWP, and to the principle of Juche.

== See also ==
- List of museums in North Korea
- List of theatres in North Korea
- List of North Korean operas
- List of North Korean television series
- Culture of Korea – covers the traditional culture of both North Korea and South Korea.
- Pet culture in North Korea
- Korean tea ceremony
- Contemporary culture of South Korea
- Korean shamanism
- Korean Confucianism
- Korean Buddhism
- Korean cuisine
- Mansudae Art Troupe
- Propaganda in North Korea
- The Flower Girl – considered one of the "Five Great Revolutionary Operas," a collection of classical, revolution-themed opera repertoires popular in North Korea.
- Kim Il Sung and Kim Jong Il badges
