= Pet industry =

Market industry associated with companion animals

The pet industry is the market industry associated with companion animals. It includes things that are associated with the production, consumption and cultural activities linked to the market. Next to nutrition, toys and animal healthcare, new services and products like taxis, kindergartens, hotels, IT appliances, broadcasting, theme parks and funeral services are appearing on the market.

== Market statistics ==
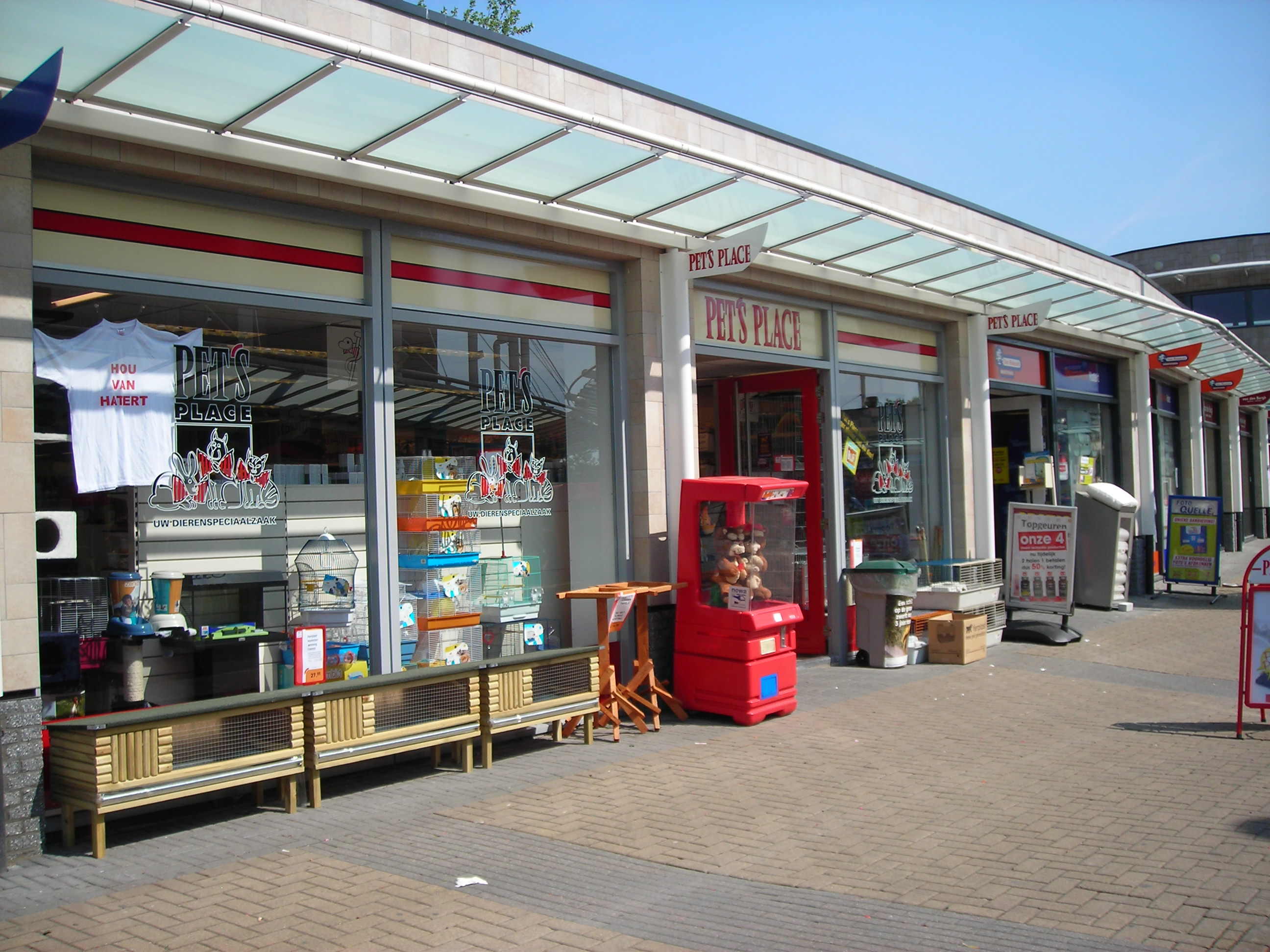
Pet Product Store

In the United States alone between 2023 and 2024 there were an estimate of 86.9 households owning pets, making for a total pet expenditure of $147 billion. In Europe, the total amount of companion animals in 2022 was estimated to be over 340 million pets. The total pet expenditures can be divided into nutrition, supplies/medicines, veterinarian care, live animal purchases, and other services.

The most commonly found pet in the United States, according to the 2023-2024 APPA National Pet Owners Survey, was the dog with 65.1 million U.S. households owning at least one as a pet. After that comes the cat with 46.5 million households keeping one. The third largest owned pet in the U.S. is the freshwater fish with 11.1 million households owning at least one fish. After that comes small animals (6.7 million households), birds (6.1 million households), reptiles (6 million households), saltwater fish, and horses at 2.2 million households.

The basic annual expenditure for keeping and maintaining a pet dog in the United States is $2,524. For keeping a cat in the United States the costs come to $1,499 per year. These costs include everything such as surgical vet visits, routine vet visits, food, vitamins, and toys. California is the most expensive state to own dogs as the average citizen spends an average of $35,452 in their dog's lifetime.

Total U.S. Pet Industry Expenditures, 2014-2024 ($ billions)
| | 2014 | 2015 | 2016 | 2017 | 2018 | 2019 | 2020 | 2021 | 2022 | 2023 | 2024 (estimated) |
|---|---|---|---|---|---|---|---|---|---|---|---|
| Expenditure | 58.04 | 60.28 | 66.75 | 69.51 | 90.5 | 97.1 | 108.9 | 123.6 | 136.8 | 147 | 150.6 |

=== Healthcare market ===
The global animal healthcare market size in 2023 was estimated at $60.72 billion with a Compound Annual Growth Rate (CAGR) of 10.5% between 2024 and 2032. The Global Animal Health Market is estimated to reach 149.02 billion by 2032. A significant part of that is the Companion Healthcare Market estimated to be as large as $22.25 billion in 2023 and is expected to rise to $22.7 billion by 2024 and $61.6 billion by 2033, with a CAGR of 10.6%. The boost of the market primarily has to do with an increase in the adoption of companion animals. The Companion Animal Healthcare Market encompasses vaccines, diagnostics, healthcare products and pharmaceuticals for pets. The market is driven by the increase of pet ownership as well as the increased awareness and need for preventative animal healthcare that comes along with increased human-animal bond awareness. The ongoing advancements in veterinary care and the increased integration of advanced technology have also drastically contributed to the rising market spend.

=== Food market ===
According to the actual sales within the U.S. market in 2018 of APPA, $30.32 billion was spent on food out of $72.56 billion. on estimated 2019 sales within the U.S. market, food is estimated to increase to $31.68 billion in the U.S. The world's largest pet food markets are in the United States, France, Japan, and Germany, accounting for over half of the sales in pet food. North America is the largest geographical segment of the market studied and accounted for a share of around 39.2% of the overall market. The pet food market is segmented by animal type, product type, ingredient type, sales channel, pricing type, and geography. The shift in pet ‘ownership’ to ‘parenting’ has been a very crucial and defining trend in the pet food market, more so in the developed countries.

== Pet economy ==
While the pet industry strictly comprises the economic framework of manufacturing, veterinary care, and retail distribution, the broader sociocultural shifts and evolving consumer behaviors driven by this market are increasingly conceptualized as the 'pet economy' (or petconomy). This distinction highlights the transition from traditional pet ownership toward more complex, culturally driven consumption patterns, as part of the contemporary pet culture.

== See also ==
- Pet humanization
- Animal–industrial complex
- Commodity status of animals
- North American Pet Health Insurance Association
- Pet store
- Cat food
- Dog food
