= Pets in South Korea =

Aspect of Korean culture

Pet ownership in South Korea has increased in recent years. Dogs are the most common household animal, owned by 75.3% of pet-owning South Korean households, followed by cats, then goldfish. South Korean pet culture is constantly developing, and the companion animal industry in South Korea is worth an estimated 3.4 trillion won as of 2020.

== Terminology ==
In South Korea, the expression "companion animal" is preferred to "pet". To South Koreans, the word "pet" typically refers to toys or entertainment, whereas "companion animal" denotes sharing emotional communication and living together. "Companion animals" are animals that live with humans and are not toys. All kinds of animals, including dogs, cats, rabbits, guinea pigs, pigs, chickens, ducks, parrots, lizards, iguanas, stag beetles, and goldfish, can be companion animals. South Korean legislation on pets was revised in 2013, and the scope of companion animal was defined by the Ministry of Agriculture, Food and Rural Affairs.

== Demographics ==
There are 8.6 million pets in 6.38 million households in South Korea. In 2019, the number of households increased by 470,000, while dogs and cats account for the largest percentage of pets. In 5.21 million households, 6.02 million dogs and 1.82 million to 2.58 million cats were found. The basic cost of raising pets in South Korea is 140,000 to 170,000 South Korean won per month, and ₩25,000 per month for smaller animals.

Adoption through acquaintances accounted for the largest percentage of domestic pet adoption methods. Among the reasons for the cancellation of animal adoption were "animal behavior problems such as damaging or barking", amounting to 29.4 percent of cancellations. Among pet households in South Korea, 80.7 percent of households preferred dogs as pets, while 25.7 percent preferred cats.

Pet breed preferred by Korean pet breeders
Ranking	kind	%
1	Maltese	23.7%
2	Poodle	19%
3	Pomeranian	11%

== Industry ==
In South Korea, the number of companion animals, especially dogs and cats, is rapidly increasing mainly due to the increase in the number of nuclear families and single-person households. It is estimated that 40% of South Korean households will consist of a single person by 2050, which is expected to be a significant contributor to the rapid growth of the companion animal population. The market size of pet related industries in Korea was estimated to be ₩1,544,000,000 billion KRW in 2018 and forecast to reach ₩3,498,000,000 in 2027. Pet foods from domestic companies accounted for the highest share of the pet food market, at 24.6 percent. In the pet toy market, share of 'nosework blankets' by domestic manufacturers is the highest (28.0 percent), while oral products (62.5 percent) and bathing products (59.5 percent) are also ranked high. As the pet industry market grows, practical and high-quality products influence purchasing and stimulate purchasing needs. All pet-related businesses in South Korea require a special license.

=== Pet funeral businesses ===
When a pet dies, their owners may choose to hold a funeral, held at animal burial facilities. Animal burial and cremation facilities also require a special license to operate. In South Korea, It is illegal to bury animal carcasses in other people's private property or parks. Deceased animals are classified as domestic waste and should be disposed of in garbage bags.

=== Pet technology ===
The increasing number of single-person households in Korea have led to more pets being left alone at home. This has led to a demand for pet monitoring devices and other pet-related electronics. Pet TV channels and pet-focused phone applications are also available.

=== Job stress ===
People employed in the pet industry can experience job-related stress, which sometimes leads to animal abuse. There are ongoing training initiatives in South Korea to help reduce the effects of job-related stress.

== Dog bite legislation ==
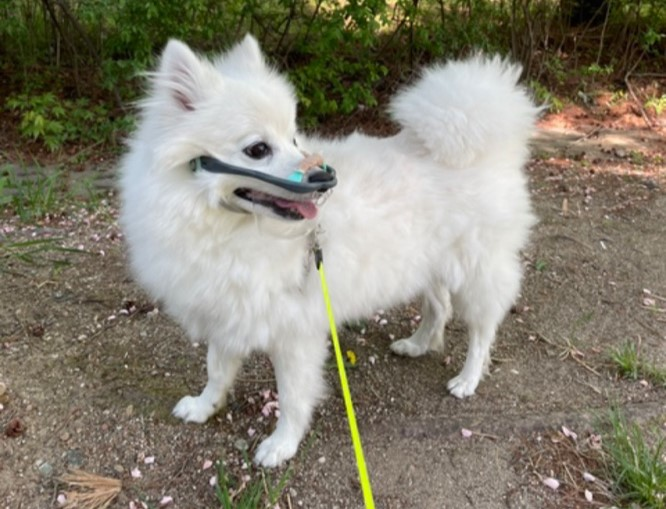
A transparent muzzle

Dog bite injuries are rising in South Korea. To mitigate this, the South Korean government mandated that dogs categorized as "ferocious" over the age of three months must wear muzzles in accordance with Article 1-2 of the Enforcement Rules of the Animal Protection Act. These breeds are also prohibited from visiting preschools, daycare centers, elementary schools, middle schools, and high schools under (Id. new art. 13–3). Aggressive dog owners are required to attend education courses to prevent their dog from accessing restricted areas. If owners are found in violation of this, they will be fined between ₩1 million and 3 million for the first, second, and third violations. To further mitigate such incidents, the government also recommended on February 12, 2021, that owners of aggressive dogs should take out insurance. Ferocious dog insurance covers ₩80 million per victim's death, ₩15 million per victim injury, and more than ₩2 million per case if another animal is injured or killed.

== Abandoned animals ==
The number of abandoned animals in Korea has steadily increased, reaching 136,000 in 2019. By contrast, the number of adoptions is only 36,000. To encourage the adoption of abandoned animals, the government has decided to provide at least ₩100,000 for each animal. Korea's budget for rescue and protection of abandoned animals was ₩23.2 billion won (19,900,000 US dollars) in 2019. Despite the expansion of investment budgets, the environment of animal shelters is still poor as more animals are abandoned. The euthanasia rate reached 23.7% in 2019. Under the revision of the Domestic Animal Protection Law, those who abandon animals can be fined up to ₩3 million. Cases of animal abandonment can also be investigated by the police.

=== Neutering of stray cats ===
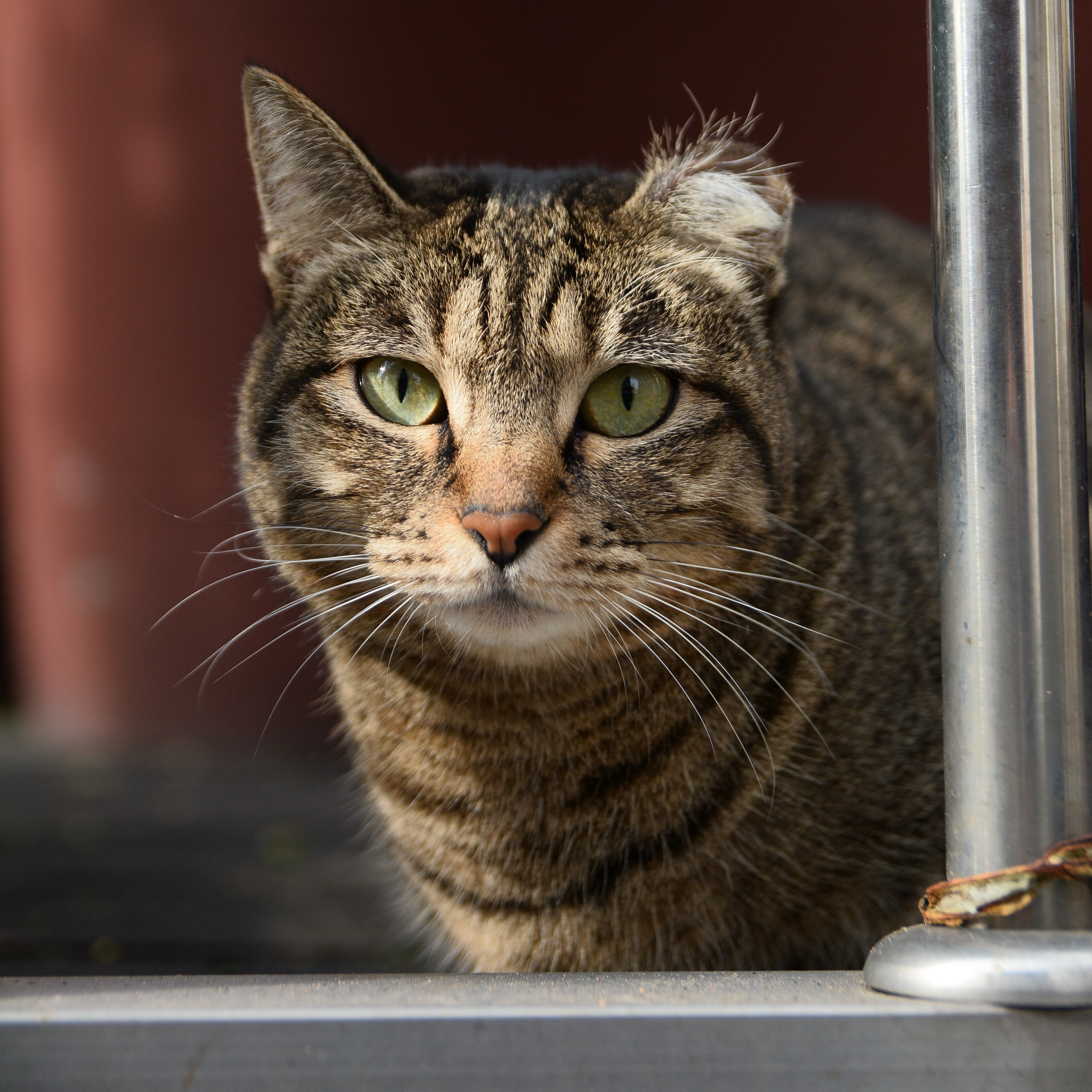
When stray cats are neutered, the tip of the ear is cut off to signify the cat's status.

Abandoned and lost animals see the highest increases in May and August, and one of the causes of this is the breeding of stray cats. The South Korean government has launched a stray cat neutering program called Trap Neuter Release (TNR). TNR is done by safely capturing stray cats, neutering them, and releasing them back to their captive locations. TNR is carried out by the Government to prevent the increase in the population of stray cats.

=== Pet registration system ===
Dog owners in South Korea must register animals in cities, counties, and district offices across the country. The Eup, Myeon, and Do areas, where a person who can act on behalf of an animal registration cannot be designated, are exempt. All dogs older than two months of age are subject to registration. If a pet is lost or abandoned, the animal registration number is used to identify their owner. Owners who do not register their pets can be fined up to ₩1 million. The pet registration system was implemented nationwide in 2014, and the number of registered animals continues to increase, from 2.092 million in 2019 to 2.321 million in 2020. The proportion of registered animals is 33% in Gyeonggi Province, 19% in Seoul, and 6% in Incheon.

== Dog meat consumption in South Korea ==
A controversial topic in South Korea is Bosintang, a soup made from dog meat. It is not illegal to slaughter and distribute dogs for consumption in South Korea. Opponents of the practice argue all dogs can be pets, but proponents argue that pets and edible dogs can be separated. There is a worldwide controversy over Korea's consumption of dog meat. Opponents of dog meat culture advocate for the protection of animal rights in the country.

On January 9, 2024, the South Korean parliament passed a law prohibiting the breeding and slaughter of dogs for consumption, which will take effect in 2027 following a three-year grace period.

== See also ==
- Pet culture in North Korea
