= Bosintang =

Korean dog meat dish

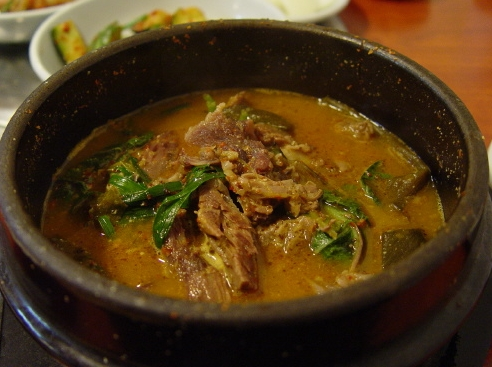
- Alternative names: tan'gogikuk (North Korea), gaejangguk, gaejang, gujang, jiyangtang, sacheoltang
- Type: Guk (tang)
- Place of origin: Korea
- Main ingredients: Dog meat, vegetables, spices

North Korean name
- Hangul: 단고기국
- RR: dangogiguk
- MR: tan'gogiguk
- IPA: tan.ɡo.ɡi.k͈uk̚

South Korean name
- Hangul: 보신탕
- Hanja: 補身湯
- RR: bosintang
- MR: posint'ang
- IPA: po.ɕin.tʰaŋ

Bosintang (Note: Also romanized boshintang.) (Korean: 보신탕, South Korean name) or tan'gogikuk (단고기국, North Korean name) is a Korean soup (guk) that uses dog meat as its primary ingredient. The meat is boiled with vegetables such as green onions, perilla leaves, and dandelions, and flavorants such as doenjang, gochujang, and perilla seed powder. It is seasoned with agastache rugosa before eating. The soup has been claimed to provide increased virility.

Dogs have been eaten on the Korean peninsula for thousands of years, but the history of bosintang is more recent. An 1849 book Dongguksesigi contains a recipe for bosintang that includes boiled dog and green onion. Bosintang is also consumed in North Korea, where it is known as dangogiguk ("sweet meat soup") and was served at dinner parties hosted by Kim Jong Il before he became leader of the country. Pyongyang hosts a specialized dangogi ("sweet meat") restaurant.

The dish, as with all dog meat consumption in South Korea, has become highly controversial in recent decades. Raising dogs for their meat is restricted, and from 2027 will be banned in the country. Few surveyed South Koreans have eaten dog meat before.

== See also ==
- Dog meat consumption in South Korea
- List of soups
- List of meat dishes
- Nureongi
- Food and drink prohibitions
