= Chollima (magazine) =

North Korean magazine

- Format: Print, c. 90 pages, on mid-quality paper
- Founded: January 1959
- Company: Art and Literature Publishing House
- Country: North Korea
- Based in: Pyongyang
- ISSN: 1727-9399
- OCLC: 502397805

The Chollima (Korean: 천리마; Hancha: 千里馬) is a monthly educational magazine of North Korea. It was first published in January 1959, initially to support the Chollima Movement. The publisher is the Chollima Editing Committee of the Art and Literature Publishing House (문학예술종합출판사). Unlike most other magazines in the country, it is targeted at the general public.
