= Pet ownership among homeless people =

Pet ownership in the USA

Between 5% and 10% of homeless people in the United States own pets (mainly dogs and/or cats). Studies of homeless pet owners in urban settings show a sense of identity and community connection between pets and their owners. This topic is part of the Animals and Society branch of study in the field of Sociology, and is also an issue with the values and responsibility of pet ownership.

== Impact on the homeless experience ==
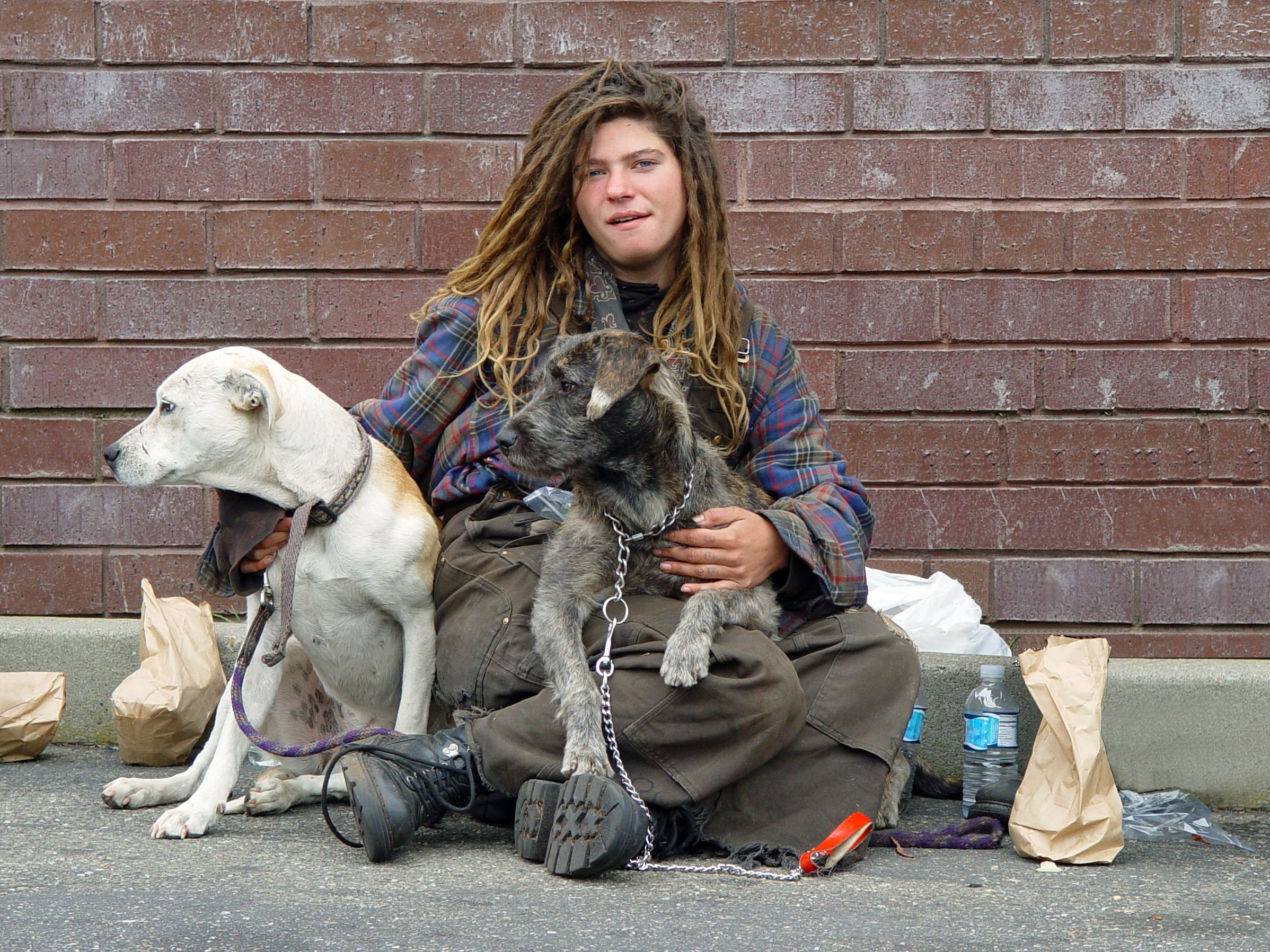
Homeless woman with dogs, Haight Street, San Francisco, California

One factor behind the actions of homeless pet owners is the fear and anxiety over the loss of their pet. This anxiety is explained in a theory by Clinton Sanders, who notes that a close relationship with a companion animal shapes the construction of the owners’ identity, and forms the basis for interaction. The owner and the pet are united in a 'couple' relationship which is socially defined. He notes that people link the animal and the owner and have a set of expectations regarding how they will act. In public animals serve as social facilitators and encourage openness to the point where strangers feel welcome in approaching the human-pet couple. This relationship is supported by Irvine in her description of the "Pack of Two" designation of the homeless owner and their pet. The combination of the anxiety for the pet, and the close emotional relationship between the owner and the pet, shapes the experience of homeless people.

=== Social interactions ===
Several studies have concluded that homeless people attribute their pet with saving their life, getting them off of drugs or alcohol; one researcher noted that many dog owners reported their dogs knew when they were sad or emotional, an example of the ‘empathetic experience” of a human-pet connection. Homeless pet owners use their pets to facilitate socialization, getting their owners out to local vet clinics and parks where they interact with other pet owners. Many homeless pet owners regard their pet with a high degree of attachment and report lower levels of loneliness with pet ownership.

=== Sobriety ===
Leslie Irvine argues pet ownership prompts many to act responsibly, with many making a deliberate choice not to drink or use drugs, and to avoid contact with substance abusers or those involved in any criminal activity for fear of being separated from their pet. Additionally, many refuse housing in shelters if their pet is not allowed to stay with them. Homeless pet owners will not sleep in shelters that do not allow pets, they will pass on the opportunity for housing if they cannot take their pet, and they will sacrifice their meal if food is limited. The role of caregiving to their pet is constructed as their primary reason for being in life. The pet is dependent on them for food and care and this gives the owner a sense of responsibility and a positive self-image and self-worth.

=== Shelter ===
As a group, homeless people who own a pet put its care first before accepting housing or shelter, employment, leisure activity, or health care, themes identified by Irvine and Sanders. These themes were earlier identified in research among the homeless in San Francisco in 1994 by UC Davis School of Veterinary Medicine researchers Aline and Robert Kidd. Similar themes were identified in research conducted in Canada by Michelle Lem, Director of Community Veterinary Outreach in Ontario, Canada. These pet owners described the ways their pets shaped their environment: they would sleep outside in the rain if the only option was shelter in a no pet shelter; their pet kept them off drugs and alcohol, and they avoided risky behavior that might result in arrest and incarceration because they feared their pet would be removed or euthanized. They also reported that they gave up going to social events at arenas or other public areas where pets were not allowed for fear their pet would be taken from them. The ways in which their pets shape their daily decisions also carries over to the level of involvement of homeless pet owners in the local community.

== Implications for social institutions ==
Social interaction among homeless people is impacted by pet ownership. Many homeless pet owners reported that having a dog facilitated conversation, but at the same time having a dog had a negative impact on their ability to find housing because homeless shelters, rental housing, and subsidized government housing continue to have strict regulations against allowing pets to reside with their homeless owners. Some action is being taken by social institutions to address the issue. San Francisco initiated a program which addressed both homelessness and animal shelter overcrowding: WOOF – Wonderful Opportunities for Occupants and Fidos. Started in August 2012, the homeless are given a dog that would otherwise be euthanized, to foster until a permanent home can be found. Homeless people are trained to care for the dogs and will receive a weekly stipend. In addition to dog training lesson, the foster owners received training in job readiness, communication skills, banking and health care. All pet food and care is provided by the shelter. Feeding Pets of the Homeless is a national nonprofit with a mission to feed and provide basic emergency veterinary care to pets of homeless people. In the UK, veterinary surgeons and registered veterinary nurses have responded to the issue by creating a charity called StreetVet, which provides free accessible veterinary care to homeless clients in need.

== See also ==
- Overpopulation in domestic pets
- Street dogs
- Abandoned pets
