= North American Pet Health Insurance Association =

- Formation: 2007
- Headquarters: Kansas City, MO
- Location: United States
- Official language: English
- Executive Director: Kristen Lynch
- Website: http://www.naphia.org

The North American Pet Health Insurance Association (NAPHIA) is an independent organization of pet health insurance companies and professionals operating in the United States and Canada. It serves as the principal governing body of the growing pet insurance industry. The North American revenues of pet insurance reached $354 million in 2009, up 14% from $310 million in 2008, as the market continues to chart what is forecast to be double-digit annual increases through the next five years. The NAPHIA is governed by a Board of Directors made up of appointed representatives from pet health insurance provider member companies.

== History ==
The North American Pet Health Insurance Association was founded in 2007. The Association is currently headquartered in Kansas City, MO in the KC Animal Health Corridor. The founding members of the Board of Directors of NAPHIA include the following; Darryl Rawlings, CEO of Trupanion, Dennis Rushovich, CEO of Hartville Group Inc., Randy Valpy, president and CEO of SecuriCan General Insurance Co. (PetSecure Canada) and Jack Stephens, DVM, Founder and President of Pets Best Insurance. The Board of Directors has changed over time with the addition of new member companies.

The NAPHIA gained momentum recently when Veterinary Pet Insurance, the industry’s largest policy writer, joined the organization in 2013. VPI also become a part of the Board of Directors.

The Association holds and annual summit with North American industry leaders, NAPHIA member companies, insurance companies, partners and other interested parties. During this event, attendees discuss best practices and new initiatives for the pet health insurance industry. The first event was held in Montreal, Canada. 2014 will mark the 3rd annual summit and it will be held in Leesburg, VA

National Pet Health Insurance Month is organized by the North American Pet Health Insurance Association each September to bring awareness to pet insurance products.

== Role In politics ==
NAPHIA takes an active role in the law making process when pet insurance is involved. NAPHIA was heavily involved in California State Assembly bill AB2411, which would have required additional regulation for pet insurance in California, but was vetoed in late September 2010 by Governor Schwarzenegger.
