= Harmonica house =

North Korean row housing type

Harmonica house (Korean: 하모니카사택) is the name used in North Korea for a type of row house found in North Korean cities.

A harmonica house is a two-storey building divided into small apartments, so called because when viewed from the front it looks like a harmonica. The typical apartment in a harmonica house is lived in by a couple or small family, and consists of a kitchen and one additional room. Toilets are shared among multiple units, and sometimes there are small attached gardens behind the house.
