= On the Art of Opera =

1974 work by Kim Jong-il

On the Art of Opera: Talk to Creative Workers in the Field of Art and Literature September 4–6, 1974
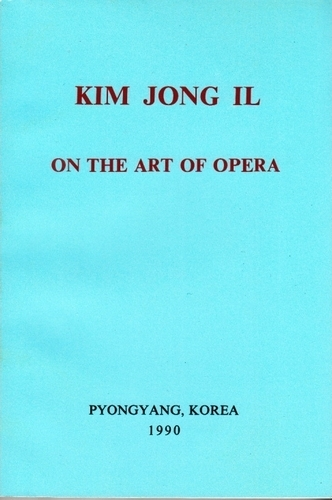
- 1990 English edition
- Author: Kim Jong Il
- Subject: Revolutionary operas -- Korea (North), Opera -- Political aspects -- Korea (North), Opera -- Political aspects, Revolutionary operas, Korea (North)
- Publisher: Foreign Languages Publishing House
- Publication date: 1974
- Publication place: North Korea
- English publication date: 1990
- Pages: 177
- OCLC: 35592320
- LC Class: ML1751.K81 K56 1990

Having reviewed the successes and experiences gained in the opera revolution, I will speak about some problems arising in further developing opera art.

— On the Art of Opera

On the Art of Opera (Korean: 가극예술에 대하여) is a 1974 treatise by Kim Jong Il on opera. According to Korea University associate professor of North Korean studies Jae-Cheon Lim, it is one of the most important North Korean works on the arts. At the time of writing, Kim had just started his career in the North Korean cultural industry. The piece takes as its framework the Juche ideology and "seed" theory that Kim had previously applied to cinema. Because opera is a mixed art form, Kim finds it particularly revealing of a nation's artistic state and important for the application of his seed theory. Kim finds hierarchies between and within elements of opera, like instruments subordinate to vocals and music over dance. The main thrust of the work is to replace classical – mainly Western but also certain forms of Korean – opera with an allegedly superior Korean revolutionary opera. Kim analyzes various Western operatic forms such as aria, recitative, and leitmotif to reject them. In Kim's view, the ideal revolutionary opera should be based on stanzaic and strophic songs, of which the highest form is a supposedly novel form of offstage chorus called pangchang. The opera that is, according to Kim, most characteristic of his ideas is Sea of Blood, which is to be emulated.

== Background ==
On the Art of Opera is a transcript of a speech that Kim Jong Il apparently made to creative workers in September 1974. Although it is not certain that Kim personally authored the piece, Lim takes its publication under his name as an indication that he was especially interested in the field. At the time of the speech Kim was only beginning his career in the cultural administration of North Korea. The speech was delivered against the backdrop of performances of the first Korean revolutionary operas such as Sea of Blood, the production of which Kim had been involved in, some three years before. The publication of On the Art of Opera came one year after Kim's first major written work, also on the arts, called On the Art of the Cinema. On the Art of Opera is one of Kim's two treatises explicitly on music, the other one being its companion piece On the Art of Music (1987).

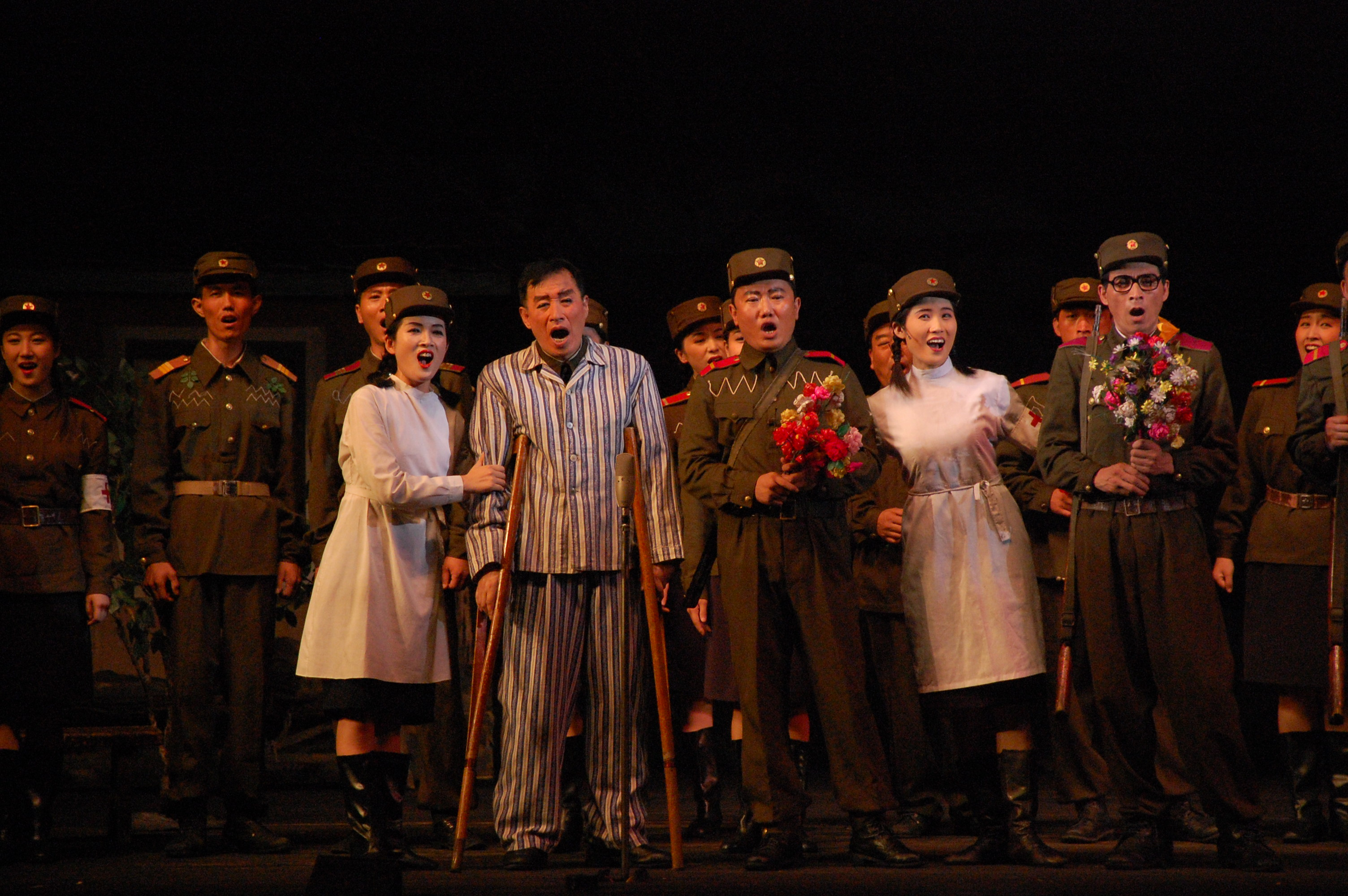
North Korean opera in Pyongyang

== Juche ideology and seed theory ==
For Kim, the process of making an opera is at least as important as the result. Operas are to be based on the Juche ideology. A good opera both entertains the public and motivates them with the nationalist, leader-centric virtues of Juche.

As with cinema in On the Art of the Cinema (1973), opera needs to be based on a "seed" (종자; chongja). A seed is what both the theme and artistic content of the opera derive from. A seed should be based on the Juche ideology, not in general but in some specific application of it. Because of the seed's crucial importance to the work, great care should be taken when choosing the seed, even before the libretto or score are written. Operas are supposed to take mythic, archetypical and heroic subjects as their subject matter.

=== Hierarchy of elements ===
Although all art forms in North Korea are subject to seed theory, Kim writes that opera is the most important in this respect. As a mixed art form, opera is useful for evaluating the overall state of arts of a particular nation. In this sense, according to Lisa Burnett of Stanford University, Kim's conception of opera comes close to the European notion of Gesamtkunstwerk (total work of art). But unlike Gesamtkunstwerk, Kim's conception of the composite art form of opera is hierarchical. Thus, vocals are over instrumental music, music over dance, and Korean instruments over Western instruments. The seed sits at the top of all these elements, which have internal hierarchies as well. For instance, in the libretto, the hero is over any supporting characters. In the score, a theme song is over supporting songs. The conductor is subordinate to the director but over the singers and orchestra, and so on.

In these hierarchies, the relationship between text and music is rather complex. On the one hand, text should define music, but on the other hand, everything must be based on the stanzaic songs. Kim resolves this tension by positing a union of text and music in which neither is superior to the other: songs are both stanzaic in text and strophic in melody. Furthermore, how to identify the theme song from the rest of the songs is not definitely put by Kim, although he says it does not have to be the most recurrent melody or a song played at any particular point of the opera.

== Breakup with Western opera ==
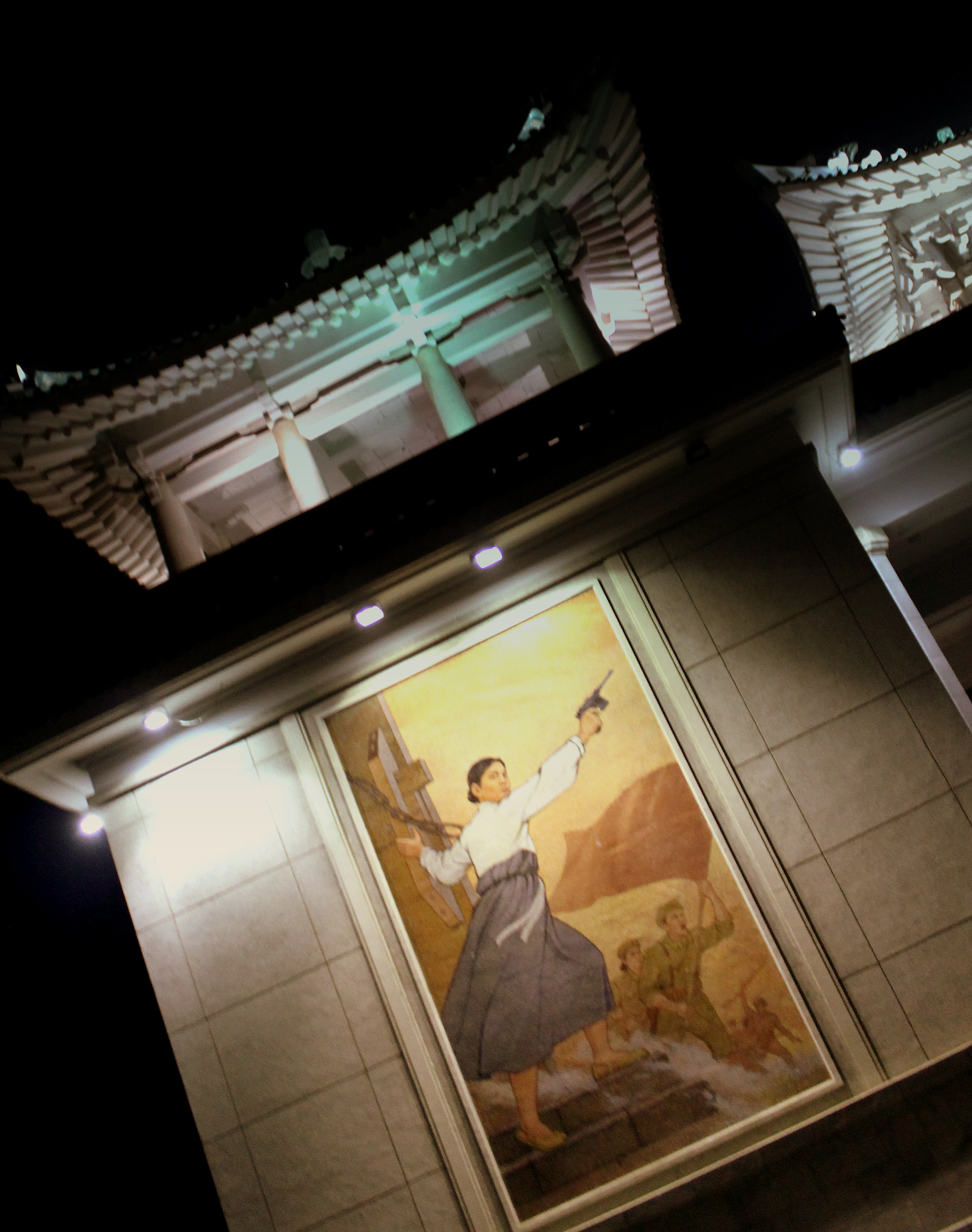
Scene from Sea of Blood painted as a mural at the Pyongyang Grand Theatre

According to Merrill Markoe, Kim's main objective is to replace earlier forms of classical opera with an allegedly improved Korean revolutionary opera. Some operas of Western style had been performed in North Korea before the early 1970s. Kim laments that they "failed to cater to the tastes and sentiments of our people [because they were] infected with flunkeyism and dogmatism" and subsequent North Korean accounts have been obliged to echo his sentiments.

In contrast to Western opera, music of Korean revolutionary opera is supposed to have Korean national characteristics. At the same time it is to be different from traditional Korean musical storytelling forms pansori and changguk. According to Burnett, On the Art of Opera contains some of the most explicit criticism of Western classical art in all of Kim's writing. In a passage criticizing Western (and possibly Peking) opera, Kim writes:

The forms and methods of portrayal of conventional [i.e. Western] operas, which were made to cater to the tastes of the exploiting classes, contain many aspects that do not appeal to the tastes and feelings of the people of our times. Our people today do not like amorphous lyrics, complicated rhythms, recitatives that are neither songs nor speeches, outmoded stage-settings and other stereotyped methods of portrayal. ... We must conduct a revolution in all domains of opera: the content and form, the system and method of creation.

One by one, Kim rejects Western operatic forms like aria, recitative, and leitmotif – all of which he seems to be reasonably familiar with according to Burnett – in favor of characteristic of Korean revolutionary opera. Instead of having arias and recitatives, a Korean revolutionary opera should only contain stanzaic, strophic songs. The ideal form of stanzaic song for Kim is pangchang (방창), a purportedly novel Korean offstage chorus that Kim hails as unique in the world. In addition to strophic, melodies should be easy to sing and emerge from characteristic motifs derived from traditional popular folk or revolutionary tunes. Their tone (loosely defined, encompassing pitch, timbre, genre and mode) should both appeal to Koreans and suit the dramatic needs of the opera. The songs should fit with one another, but without repetition or being formulaic. How exactly this fit is to be achieved is vaguely defined by Kim, other than that it is achieved by the orchestra and could encompass unity of motifs, modal or harmonic connections, rhythmic figures, and so on.

Some of Kim's ideas have precedents that he does not acknowledge. Opera with strophic songs and spoken dialogue, for instance, has a precedent in Soviet revolutionary opera. Similarly, there is offstage singing in European opera. Although the form is not typical of 18th and 19th century opera, one example is Giuseppe Verdi's Il trovatore. Further parallels can be found in ancient Greek dramas, but Kim does not acknowledge any of these connections. Sometimes Kim is speaking generally and merely stating the obvious, like "The orchestra must accompany songs skillfully" or "Excellent lyrics are a prerequisite for excellent music", and so on.

== Sea of Blood as the ideal opera ==
According to Kim, Sea of Blood, the production of which he oversaw in 1971, is the exemplar of a perfect opera. Because Sea of Blood preceded the publication of On the Art of Opera, it is likely that Kim was in the process of systematizing his thought at the time. (Note: Kim did publish short pieces on opera in the meantime: The Revolutionary Opera the Sea of Blood Is a New Opera of a Type of Our Own (1971), Let Us Produce Revolutionary Operas That Are High in Ideological and Artistic Quality by Strictly Applying the Principle of Creating Revolutionary Operas of the Type of the Sea of Blood (1971), and On Consolidating and Developing the Successes Achieved in the Creation of Revolutionary Operas (1973). Of these, many of the contents of The Revolutionary Opera the Sea of Blood Is a New Opera of a Type of Our Own are also incorporated in On the Art of Opera.) Sea of Blood was quickly followed by four similar operas: A True Daughter of the Party (1971), The Flower Girl (1972), Tell O' The Forest! (1972), and The Song of Mount Kumgang (1973), all of which according to Kim are either written by or otherwise closely associated with Kim Il Sung. These are collectively known in North Korea as the "Five Great Revolutionary Operas".

Many features found in Sea of Blood are those that are emphasized in On the Art of Opera. Some, however, are not found directly in the treatise. For instance, the role of the orchestra is heightened. Kim sets these works as models for future operas and urges for more to be created in the same style. Kim argues that such operas inspire both the masses and their creators.

== Influence ==
According to Lim, On the Art of Opera is one of the most important North Korean works on the arts. Kim continued to write on the arts until the 1990s and published treatises On the Art of the Drama (1988), On the Art of Dance (1990), On the Art of Music (1991), On Fine Art (1991), On Architecture (1991), On Juche Literature (1992), and Theory of Circus (1993).

On the Art of Opera has been published by the Foreign Languages Publishing House in English, Arabic, French, Japanese, Russian, and Spanish. An English reprint is also available by the University Press of the Pacific.

== See also ==
- Kim Jong Il bibliography
