= Cinema of North Korea =

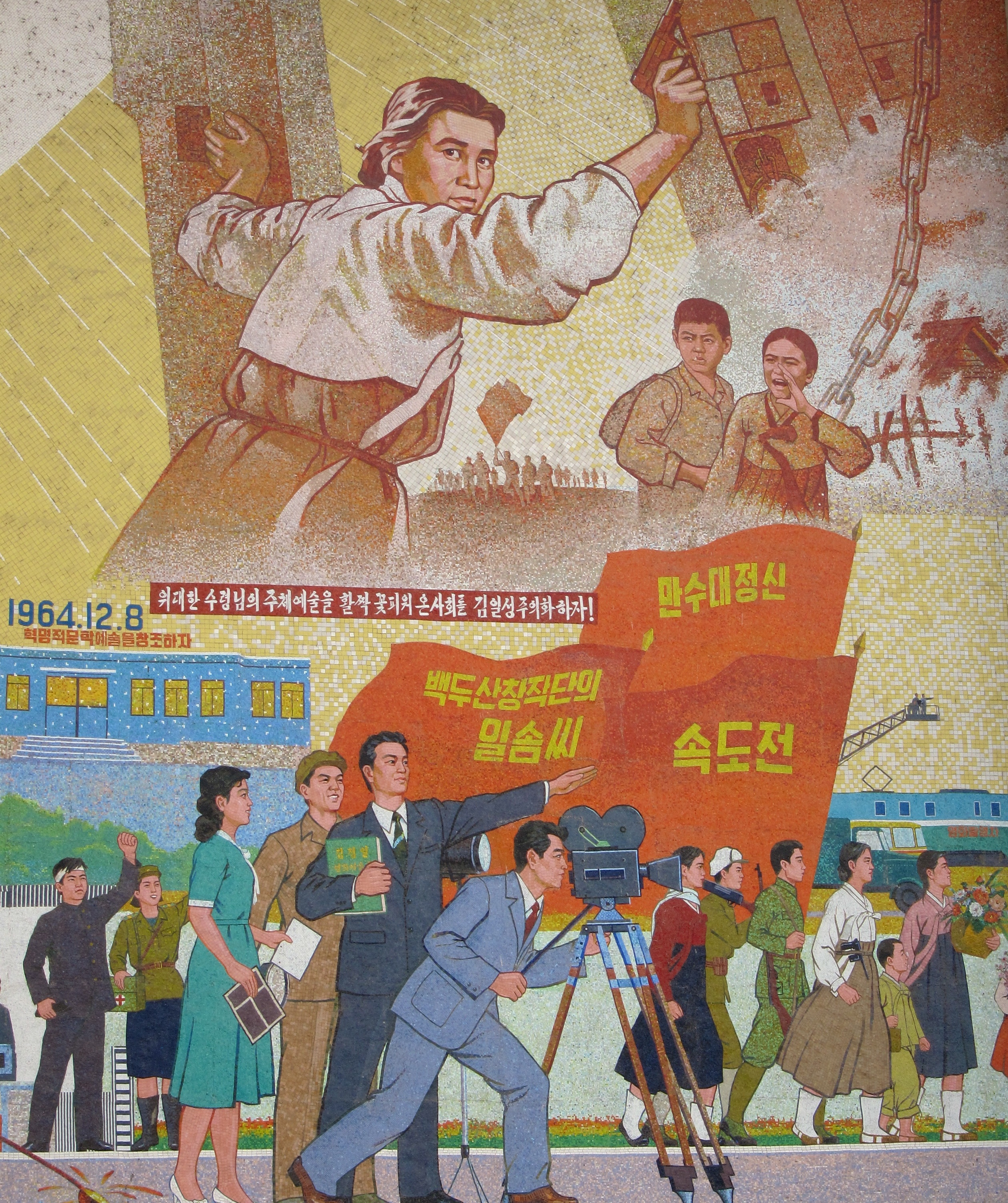
A mural dedicated to the art of filmmaking at the Korean Art Film Studio in Pyongyang

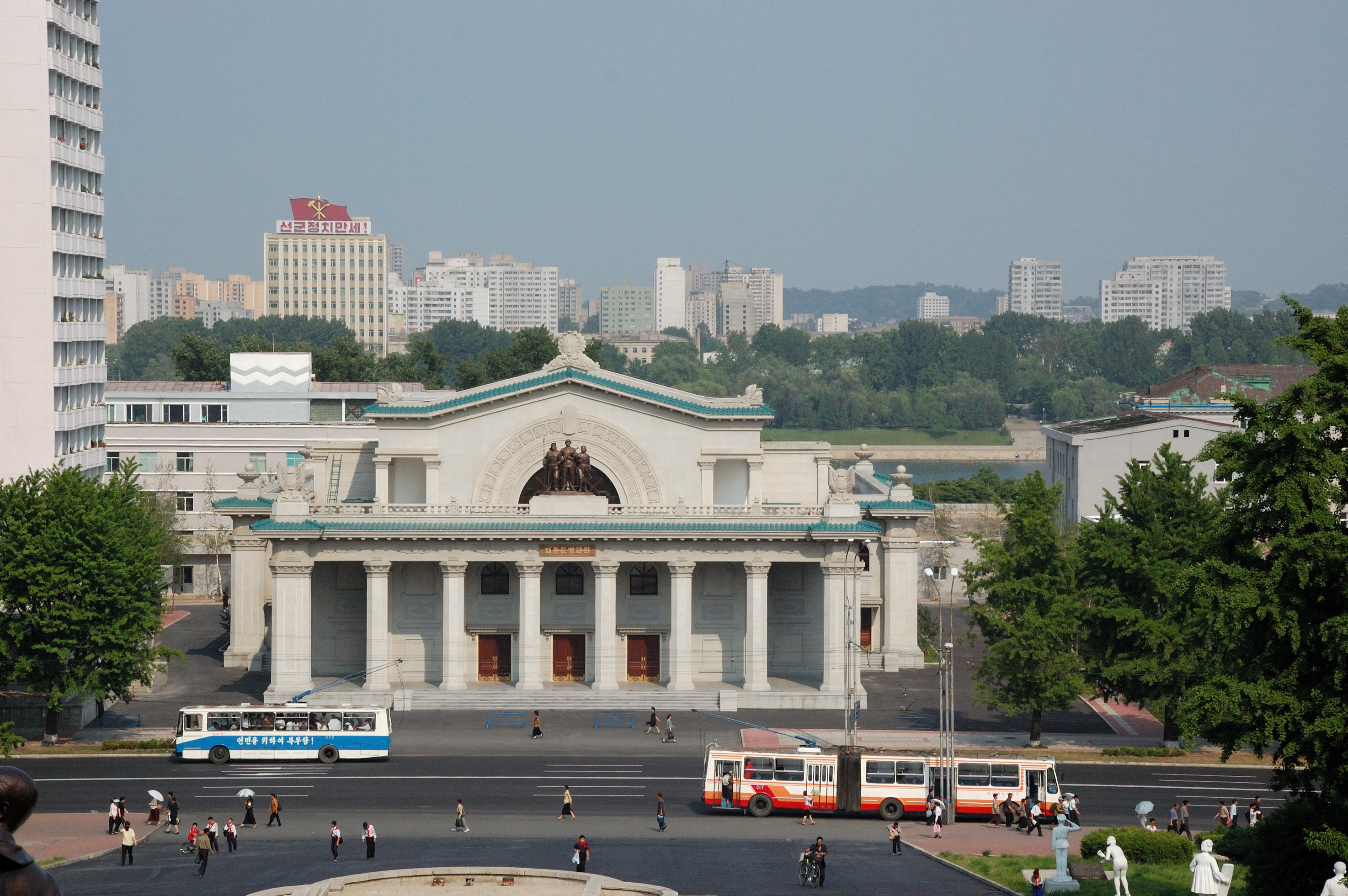
Taedongmoon Cinema, Pyongyang

The cinema of North Korea began with the division of Korea and has been sustained since then by the ruling Kim dynasty. Kim Il Sung and his successor Kim Jong Il were both cinephiles and sought to produce propaganda films based on the Juche ideology.

All film production is supervised by the Workers' Party of Korea and generally concerns propaganda. North Korea has nevertheless produced some non-propaganda films for export to the wider world. The North Korean film industry is sometimes referred to as "Chollywood", a portmanteau of "chollima" and "Hollywood".

== Film studios ==
North Korea's principal producer of feature films is the Korean Art Film Studio, a state-run studio founded in 1947 and located outside of Pyongyang. Other North Korean film studios include the Korean Documentary Film Studio (founded in 1946), the April 25 Film Studio of the Korean People's Army (founded in 1959 and previously known as the February 8 Cinema Studio) and the Korean Science and Educational Film Studio (founded in 1953 and also known as the April 26 Children's Film Production House, and Science Educational Korea, or SEK.) These studios produce feature films, documentaries, animated films, children's films and science films. According to a report from 1992, the Korean Feature Film Studio produced about forty films per year, while the other studios together accounted for another forty.

In addition to its domestic animated productions, SEK has produced animation for foreign companies. Production costs in North Korea are very low, and the quality of animators is well perceived. SEK has done work on such productions as Mondo TV's animated series Pocahontas and King Lion Simba and the films Light Years and Empress Chung.

North Korean leader Kim Il Sung believed in Lenin's maxim: "Cinema is the most important of all arts." Accordingly, since the country's division, North Korean films have often been used as vehicles for instilling government ideology into the people. A common theme is martyrdom/sacrifice for the nation. The film Fate of a Self-defence Corps Member, based on a novel written by Kim Il Sung during the fight against the Japanese occupation reflects this theme, as does the highly regarded film, Sea of Blood (1969). The latter film comes from a novel telling the story of a woman farmer who becomes a national heroine by fighting the Japanese.

Another favorite theme is the happiness of the current society. This theme can be seen reflected in titles of feature films like A Family of Workers, A Flowering Village, The Spinner, When Apples Are Picked. All of these films were awarded the People's Prize before 1974.

== Production estimates ==
The number of films produced in North Korea is difficult to determine. In 1992, Asiaweek reported that the country produced about 80 films annually, and a BBC report in 2001 indicated that North Korea was then producing about 60 films a year. In spite of these claims, Johannes Schönherr, an attendee of the 2000 Pyongyang International Film Festival, found little evidence for actual films or titles. He notes that the country offered only one domestic feature and one documentary at their most high-profile film festival, and suggests that the high number of reported films includes short films, cartoons, and short installments of long-running series. He also cites a 1998 North Korean pamphlet containing a list of films which had been made in the country up to 1998. This gives a total of 259 titles, and indicates that the 1980s were the most prolific decade with about 15 to 20 films made yearly.

The British Film Institute Sight & Sound magazine reported that an average of 20 films per year were made from the 1960s to the early 1990s. However, in the economic hard times following the collapse of the Soviet Union film production reduced, and from 2000 to 2009 only about 5 films per year were made.

== Film festivals ==
The Pyongyang International Film Festival, established in 1987 and broadened in scope in 2002, is now held every two years.

== History ==
=== 1940s and 1950s ===
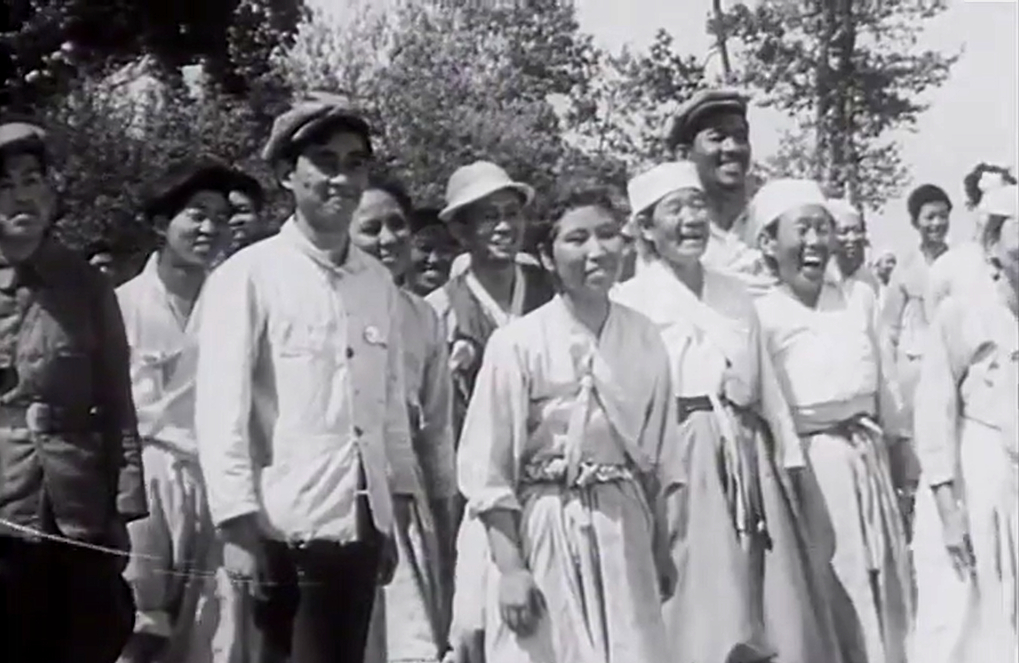
A scene from My Home Village (1949), the first North Korean feature film.

After the division of Korea following the defeat of the Japanese Empire in World War II, filmmakers in the North and the South sought to produce the first Korean film after the liberation in their respective half of the peninsula. The first North Korean film was a documentary released in July 1946 called Our Construction. For feature-length films, Viva Freedom! was released in 1946 and My Home Village in 1949.

Nearly all studios and film archives were destroyed during the Korean War, and after 1953 studios had to be rebuilt.

=== 1960s and 1970s ===
A Spinner (1964) and Boidchi annun dchonson (1965) were made in the 1960s. One of the most highly regarded films in North Korea, Sea of Blood, was produced in 1969. The entrance hall to the Korean Feature Film Studio contains a mural of "Dear Leader" Kim Jong Il supervising the production of this film. This is a two-part, black and white film. The first part is 125 minutes in duration, and the second is 126 minutes.

Kim Il Sung made a famous call for Juche art in 1966, saying, "Our art should develop in a revolutionary way, reflecting the Socialist content with the national form". In a 1973 treatise on film entitled On the Art of the Cinema, Kim Jong Il further developed this idea of Juche art into the cinema, claiming that it is cinema's duty to help develop the people into "true communists", and as a means "to completely eradicate capitalist elements". Kim Jong Il, an avid film buff, used this treatise to detail his views on filmmaking as both an art form and a tool of propaganda. The book deals comprehensively with aspects of cinema, including film and literary theory, acting, performance, score music, the screen, camerawork, costumes, make-up, and props. Of particular importance are themes of directing and producing as the driving forces of filmmaking. Ideas in the book are elucidated by drawing examples from North Korean films, of which Sea of Blood is the most referred one. On the Art of the Cinema presents two major theories: the theory of literature as "humanics" and the "seed theory". Both are considered justifications for the party's control over artistic creation. Other ideas developed by the treatise are the so-called "modeling theory" and "speed campaign". Compliance with these principles earns an artwork the title of "collective work".

Part of this ideological usage of the arts was a treating of the same subjects repeatedly through various art forms. Consequently, the most prominent films of the era took their stories and titles from pre-existing novels, ballets or operas. The film Sea of Blood was also an opera and a symphony, as well as the name of an opera company. Future Minister of Culture, Choe Ik-kyu's The Flower Girl (1972, 130 min.) later was remade as a dance. This film won a special prize and special medal at the 18th International Film Festival, and is one of the more well-known North Korean films of the 1970s.

Unsung Heroes, a 20-part epic miniseries about the Korean War, was released between 1978 and 1981; it achieved notice outside of North Korea two decades later mainly because United States Forces Korea defector Charles Robert Jenkins played a role as a villain and the husband of one of the main characters. Other American defectors had roles in the series, such as James Joseph Dresnok, Larry Allen Abshier, and Jerry Wayne Parrish.

North Korean film developed a mass audience in China during the Cultural Revolution. In 1978, the North Korean government abducted the South Korean filmmaker Shin Sang-ok and his ex-wife, the actress Choi Eun-hee. While in North Korea, Shin Sang-ok and Choi Eun-hee were forced to create seven films, including, most famously, Pulgasari, a kaiju film heavily influenced by Japanese tokusatsu films such as the Godzilla franchise. The two escaped in 1986. The films produced by the two while in North Korea are considered to have been significant milestones in the history of Korean cinema, and Pulgasari later became the first North Korean film to be shown in South Korean theaters. Pulgasari has also become a cult classic outside of North Korea.

=== 1980s and 1990s ===
With 14 listings, the 1980s is the best-represented decade for North Korea at IMDB. A possible turning to less didactic subjects is indicated with a 1986 production of the popular stories like Chunhyang-jon (1980 – 155 min.) and Hong Kil-dong (1986 – 115 min.). Probably the most well-known North Korean film internationally is the giant-monster epic, Pulgasari (1985), directed by a kidnapped South Korean director Shin Sang-ok. Multi-part films promoting the Juche ideology, including Star of Korea and The Sun of the Nation were also produced in the 1980s. North Korean animation produced for domestic consumption is reportedly less politically dogmatic during this period, resulting in a large adult audience. At least one international co-production has been filmed in North Korea, Ten Zan - Ultimate Mission, directed by Italian director Ferdinando Baldi and starring American Frank Zagarino. Norodom Sihanouk, a filmmaker and former King of Cambodia, was among Kim Il Sung's good friends, allowing him to make up to four films in North Korea beginning with The Mysterious City in 1988, using the country's actors and facilities while in exile away from Cambodia.

=== 2000s to present ===
The 2005 animated film Empress Chung, directed by Nelson Shin, is a co-production of South and North Korea. In order to save costs, Shin collaborated with the North Korean SEK Studio because North Korean animators are paid less than South Korean animators. The film made use of 500 animators, 400 of which were North Korean. On August 12, 2005, Empress Chung became the first film to have been released simultaneously in both North and South Korea. It played in 6 theaters in North Korea and 51 theaters in South Korea. The film won a prize at the 2003 Annecy International Animation Film Festival and won the top prize at the 2004 Seoul International Cartoon and Animation Festival.

Since 2013, North Korea has had 4D film theaters.

== See also ==
- Abduction of Shin Sang-ok and Choi Eun-hee
- List of North Korean films
- List of North Korean television series
- On the Art of the Cinema

== Bibliography ==
- Korean Review. Pyongyang, North Korea: Foreign Languages Publishing House. 1974.
- Malakunas, Karl (June 1993). "North Korea: Literature, Music, and Film". country-data.com.
- Schönherr, Johannes (2007). "A Permanent State of War: A Short History of North Korean Cinema". In Matthew Edwards (ed.). Film Out of Bounds; Essays and Interviews on Non-Mainstream Cinema Worldwide. Jefferson, North Carolina, and London: McFarland & Company, Inc. pp. 135–204. ISBN 978-0-7864-2970-7.
- Seo, Cheong-nam (2002). Seo Cheong-nam ui Pukhan yonghwa tamsa (in Korean). Seoul, Korea: Saenggak ui Namu. ISBN 89-8498-186-9.
