= On the Art of the Cinema =

1973 treatise by Kim Jong Il

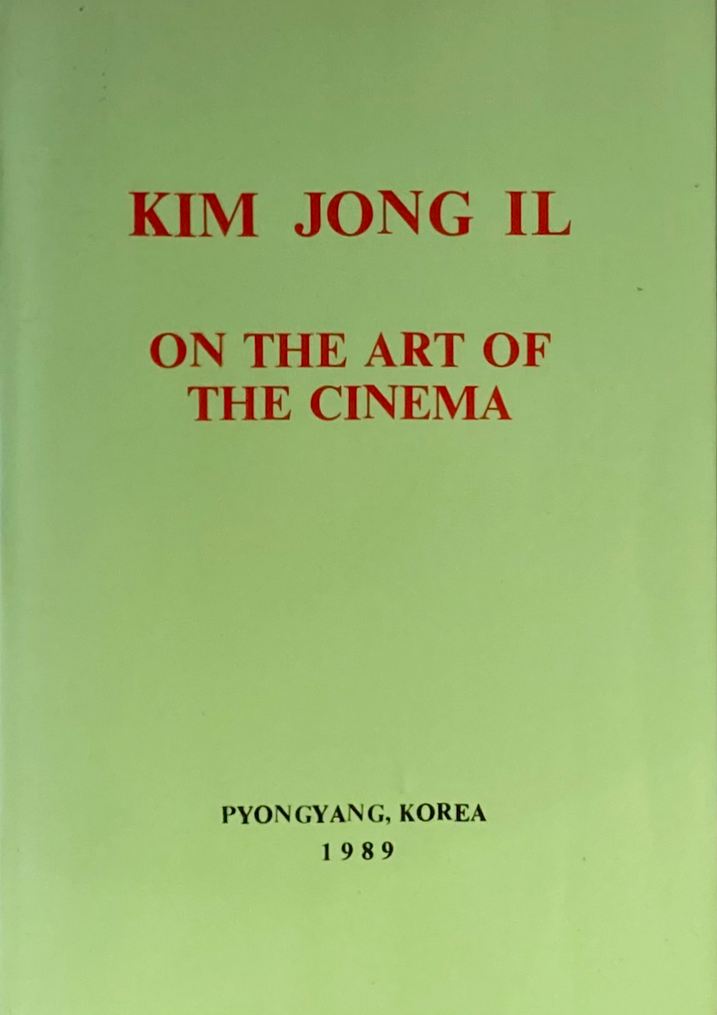
- Cover page of the English edition of On the Art of the Cinema
- Author: Kim Jong Il
- Language: Korean
- Subject: Motion pictures in propaganda, Government policy, Korea (North)
- Published: April 11, 1973 in Pyongyang: Workers' Party of Korea Publishing House (Korean ed.)
- Publication place: North Korea
- English publication date: 1989 in Pyongyang: Foreign Languages Publishing House
- Media type: Print
- Pages: 410 (Korean ed.); 329 (English ed.)
- OCLC: 22903260

Korean name
- Hangul: 영화예술론
- Hanja: 映畫藝術論
- RR: Yeonghwa yesullon
- MR: Yŏnghwa yesullon

On the Art of the Cinema (Note: The work is sometimes referred to as (The) Theory of Cinematic Art and Essays on the Cinema, but it has been only published in English under the title On the Art of the Cinema.) (Korean: 영화예술론; lit. 'Film Art Theory') is a 1973 treatise by the North Korean leader Kim Jong Il. It is considered the most authoritative work on North Korean filmmaking.

The book sets forth several original theories, which can be applied to the practices of filmmaking, the arts, and beyond. Of these the theory of literature as "humanics" and the "seed theory" are the most important ones. Humanics centers on the question of a good and worthy life. In art, it emphasizes truly independent individuals who are capable of transforming society. The seed theory has become essential to North Korean film theory. It seeks to direct all artistic creation through a single ideological foundation, or "seed". In an individual work, the seed is the synthesis of its subject matter and idea and the basis of its propaganda message. These ideas complement the themes of nationalistic form and socialist content of films. Many ideas presented in the book are justifications for the creation of propaganda supporting the Workers' Party of Korea's policies.

On the Art of the Cinema had major political implications on Kim Jong Il's succession of Kim Il Sung. Kim Jong Il gained political and cultural influence in North Korean society and government by authoring the book.

The impact of On the Art of the Cinema on North Korean filmmaking is disputed. Films from before and after the publication of the treatise are similar in style and many contemporary films breach various rules laid out in the treatise.

== Background ==
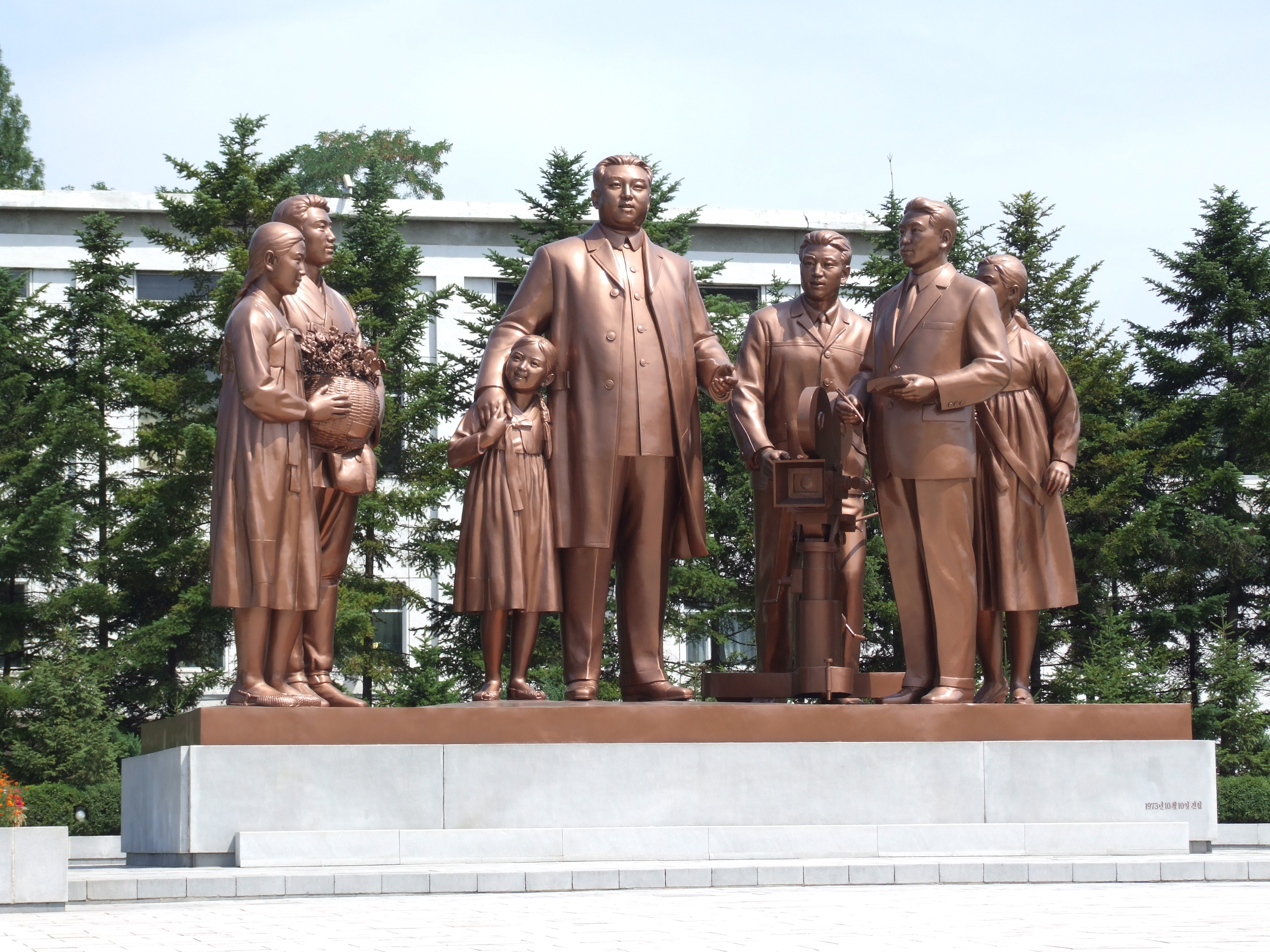
A statue of Kim Il Sung at the Pyongyang Film Studios. On the Art of the Cinema reformulated many ideas of Kim Il Sung on art to be specific to cinema.

After graduating from Kim Il Sung University in 1964, Kim Jong Il devoted himself to cultural, ideological and propaganda work at the Department of Organization and Guidance of the Central Committee of the party. Although Kim is known to have been privately interested in Hollywood films, he forbade discussion on foreign film concepts at the Aesthetic Review Meeting, an important annual film conference. After he had ordered the entire conference archive to be destroyed, Kim urged participants to be exclusively concerned with the teachings of Kim Il Sung and the party in creative work. Since then, Kim Jong Il's influence in film and literary administration grew, and he resisted liberal artistic influence from the de-Stalinizing Soviet Union. From 1968, Kim began to work on film adaptations of guerrilla plays originating from the 1930s. Kim had personally guided the production of films, such as Sea of Blood, (parts one and two, 1969), The Fate of a Self-Defence Corps Man (한 자위단원의 운명; Han chawidanwŏnŭi unmyŏng, 1970) and The Flower Girl (1972). Afterwards, Kim Jong Il began producing revolutionary operas. Kim had worked in the government arts administration for almost ten years by this time. He then wrote a series of essays based on speeches he had given to directors and screenwriters over the preceding five years, and published it as On the Art of the Cinema on April 11, 1973. It was his first major work. Through the rest of the 1970s, Kim continued to oversee cultural activities.

== Ideas ==
The cinema occupies an important place in the overall development of art and literature. As such it is a powerful ideological weapon for the revolution and construction. Therefore, concentrating efforts on the cinema, making breakthroughs and following up success in all areas of art and literature is the basic principle that we must adhere to in revolutionizing art and literature.

— From the preface of On the Art of the Cinema

In the treatise, Kim Jong Il seeks to apply the principles of the North Korean Juche ideology to questions of film, literature and art. According to Kim, "revolutionizing" cinema is a means of revolutionizing the whole of art and literature and exposing society to the Workers' Party's "monolithic ideology" and Juche. Building upon socialist realist literary theory and Kim Il Sung's thought, Kim Jong Il constructs what has been described as a "Juche realism". A key aim of Kim is to employ heroic film fiction to transform man into a socialist man: "Juche-type man".

The book deals comprehensively with aspects of cinema, including film and literary theory, acting, performance, score music, the screen, camerawork, costumes, make-up, and props. Of particular importance are themes of directing and producing as the driving forces of filmmaking. Ideas in the book are elucidated by drawing examples from North Korean films, of which Sea of Blood is the most referred one. On the Art of the Cinema presents two major theories: the theory of literature as "humanics" and the "seed theory". Both are considered justifications for the party's control over artistic creation. Other ideas developed by the treatise are the so-called "modeling theory" and "speed campaign". Compliance with these principles earns an artwork the title of "collective work".

Films should be realistic, which is possible only when the filmmakers have lived with the popular masses, much like the ideal of the revolutionaries of the Korean resistance. However, this "realism" entails unadulterated worship for the leader and Juche, making it incomparable to conventional types of realism in film, like Italian neorealism. Kim builds on the idea that contemporary North Korea has transcended class conflict and no real conflicts exist to be portrayed in cinema, bar historical and external ones. This can be seen as a reassertion of the Stalinist Zhdanov Doctrine. No "negative people" who would disagree with the party's policies can exist. Depicting conflicts within North Korean society in film could be considered being critical of the regime. When historical themes are depicted, traditions should be portrayed selectively to support present ideological needs, purged of "feudal ideologies" of traditional tales and legends.

=== Literature as humanics ===
The theory of literature as "humanics" (MR: inganhak) developed by Kim Jong Il establishes that literature exists within the human domain. A key theme of humanics is the question of good and worthy life, allowing for propagandist and moralistic art. The idea of Chajusŏng (Korean for 'independent spirit') is also prominent in the theory of humanics. Chajusŏng is the metaphysical essence of humans struggling against oppression. Philosophically, it depends on the indeterministic view on free will in Juche. The hero of the story, in particular, embodies Chajusŏng. According to Kim, "humanics literature" gives emphasis to the development of truly independent individuals as called for by the Juche era. This brings about a transformation of the society as a whole. In North Korean literature, Chajusŏng is used as a justification of state control on literary creation and a nationalistic policy of socialism in one country.

=== Seed theory ===
The "seed theory" (종자론; chongjaron) forms the essence of On the Art of the Cinema and, consequently, North Korean film theory in general. (Note: Although being often attributed to Kim Jong-il and On the Art of the Cinema, the seed theory appears to predate the treatise. An official biography of Kim Jong Il explains that Kim spoke of the seed theory throughout the late 1960s and early 1970s, but at that time "officials could not understand what this strange term 'seed' meant".)

It has been called a "strange concept", a method of coercing artists to follow the party line, and a means of canceling out individual creativity; Kim Jong Il equates a film with a living organism, noting that in this analogy the seed is its kernel. The idea is that, if all artistic interpretation is done through a single ideological foundation, or "seed", the resulting cinema is whole. This makes all members of a creative team work for a single goal, in spite of differences in the personalities or focus of the individual members. The director's task is to prevent anything "foreign" to the seed itself from entering cinema. Thus, the seed is the fundamental consciousness underlying artistic creativity.

In more concrete terms, the seed is the basis of the propaganda message of the film: "a strong, convincing idea of what to tell". The seed synthesizes the subject matter and the idea of a work, thus providing both the form and content. In this capacity, it fuses together the Marxist–Leninist literary theory concepts of "material", "theme" and "thought". The film should contribute to the ruling ideology and employ esthetics and storytelling that support the propaganda message. For example, the seed of film The Fate of a Self-Defence Corps Man revolves around the choice facing the main character, Gap Ryong: to perish under oppression or sacrificing one's self for the revolution. Its seed could be summarized as "whether or not Gap Ryong participates in the revolutionary movement, he dies". Surplus value, Kim argues, is the seed of Marx's Capital.

The seed theory became influential in the literary circles of North Korea and writers sought to backtrack the seeds in classics preceding Kim's treatise. In addition to questions of art, the seed theory was adopted to a wider range of industrial and economic activities.

=== Modeling theory and speed campaign ===
According to the "modeling theory", liberation struggles should be portrayed so as to combine national and class struggle. This is achieved through idolizing portrayal of the North Korean people and by producing role-models.

The "speed campaign" (MR: sokto-jon) calls for rapid production of films. According to Kim Jong Il, by producing films as fast as possible, the overall revolutionary process is expedited. The origins of the speed campaign are in the shooting of The Fate of a Self-Defence Corps Man in just 40 days when it was anticipated to take a full year. The practice was carried out after publication of On the Art of the Cinema, too. For instance, the eight-part film series Unsung Heroes (1979–1981) was produced by following the speed campaign principle. Each film took just 45 days to produce. Subsequently, speed campaigns have been carried out not only in art, but also economic matters. It was thought of as equally important with Kim Il Sung's Chollima Movement, and remains an influential concept associated with Kim Jong Il's leadership.

== Reception and influence ==
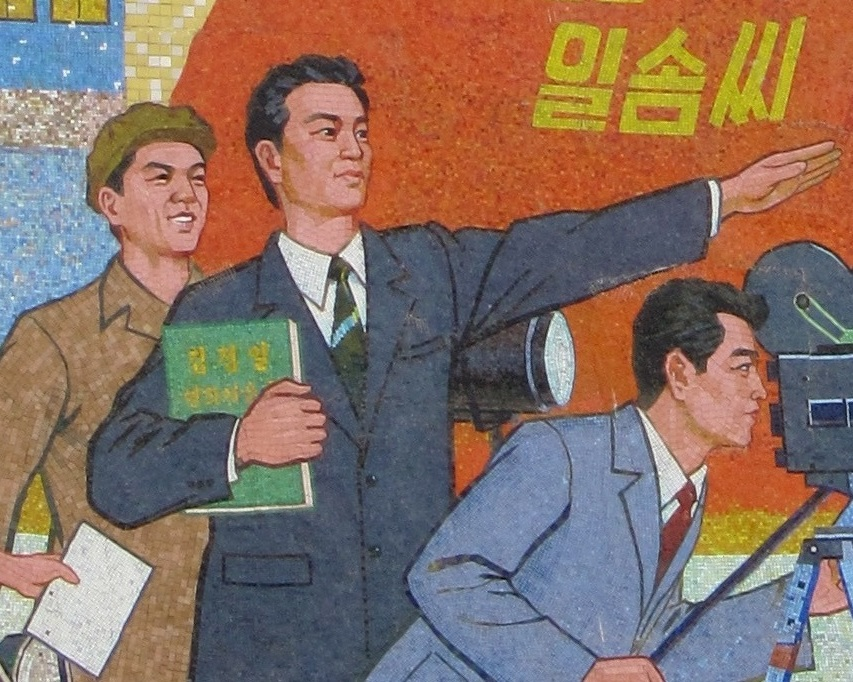
A detail of a mural featuring a filmmaker holding onto a copy of On the Art of the Cinema. Although the book is considered the highest authority on cinema in North Korea, it is unclear whether it has actually changed filmmaking practices.

While official biographies of Kim Jong Il describe On the Art of the Cinema as comprehensive, original and "supported by impeccable logic", Whitney Mallett calls it boring and repetitive. Anna Broinowski calls On the Art of the Cinema "turgid, whimsical and clunky". David-West, however, points out that the work shows "some understanding of the constructive elements of the literary text".

The work is considered the most authoritative guide on filmmaking in North Korea. However, the real extent of its influence is doubted. According to Johannes Schönherr, the work offers little new to North Korean cinema, and many of the ideas presented are unoriginal and obvious, particularly to the specialist audience of professional filmmakers Kim is writing for. Films from before and after the publication of the treatise are remarkably similar, suggesting that it had little impact on North Korean film industry in practice. Many traits of contemporary North Korean cinema, such as repetitiveness, slow editing style, and old theatrical acting, go against the teachings of On the Art of the Cinema. Whatever change there was in North Korean cinema, can be attributed to political and economic pressures. Instead of contributing anything new, the work reformulates Kim Il Sung's ideas about the importance of film to art and as a propaganda tool. Rather than the theoretical breakthrough it is taught as, it is an account of Kim Jong Il's personal experiences in the film industry and an attempt to thwart the "sloppiness and thoughtlessness" he had encountered.

Kim himself considered his treatise a failure. Films it had contributed to were enjoyed at home, but abroad they were ridiculed. North Korean cinema could not compete with the quality of foreign, and in particular South Korean, films. This directly prompted him to kidnap Shin Sang-ok, South Korea's most famous film director, in 1978. Shin and his wife, actress Choi Eun-hee, were kept in North Korea for eight years under cruel conditions. Nevertheless, Shin studied On the Art of the Cinema to please Kim with the kaijū film Pulgasari, which credits Kim as the executive producer. Kim was delighted with the film and allowed Shin and Choi to travel to Vienna, where they were supposed to negotiate a deal for a sequel. The couple used the opportunity to escape and ended up in America.

Politically, the treatise was a success. At the time of writing On the Art of the Cinema, Kim's father Kim Il Sung was systematically rallying support for the younger Kim to prepare for his succession. By authoring the work, Kim Jong Il gained social and political power. He secured his father's confidence, thus making succession possible. Kim Jong Il continued to write on the arts until the 1990s and published treatises On the Art of Opera (1974), On the Art of the Drama (1988), On the Art of Dance (1990), On the Art of Music (1991), On Fine Art (1991), On Architecture (1991), On Juche Literature (1992), and Theory of Circus (1993).

On the Art of the Cinema is mandatory reading for North Korean students of literature. North Korean filmmakers must also study the work, or even memorize it. On the Art of the Cinema also influenced South Korea's minjung-oriented People's Cinema (MR: minjung yŏnghwa) movement that was born out of the Gwangju Democratization Movement. The work's influence goes beyond Korea, too. Australian Anna Broinowski directed Aim High in Creation!, a movie about making a propaganda film abiding by Kim's instructions. Danish documentarist Mads Brügger in his The Red Chapel is shown continuously consulting the treatise for artistic guidance.

== Release details ==
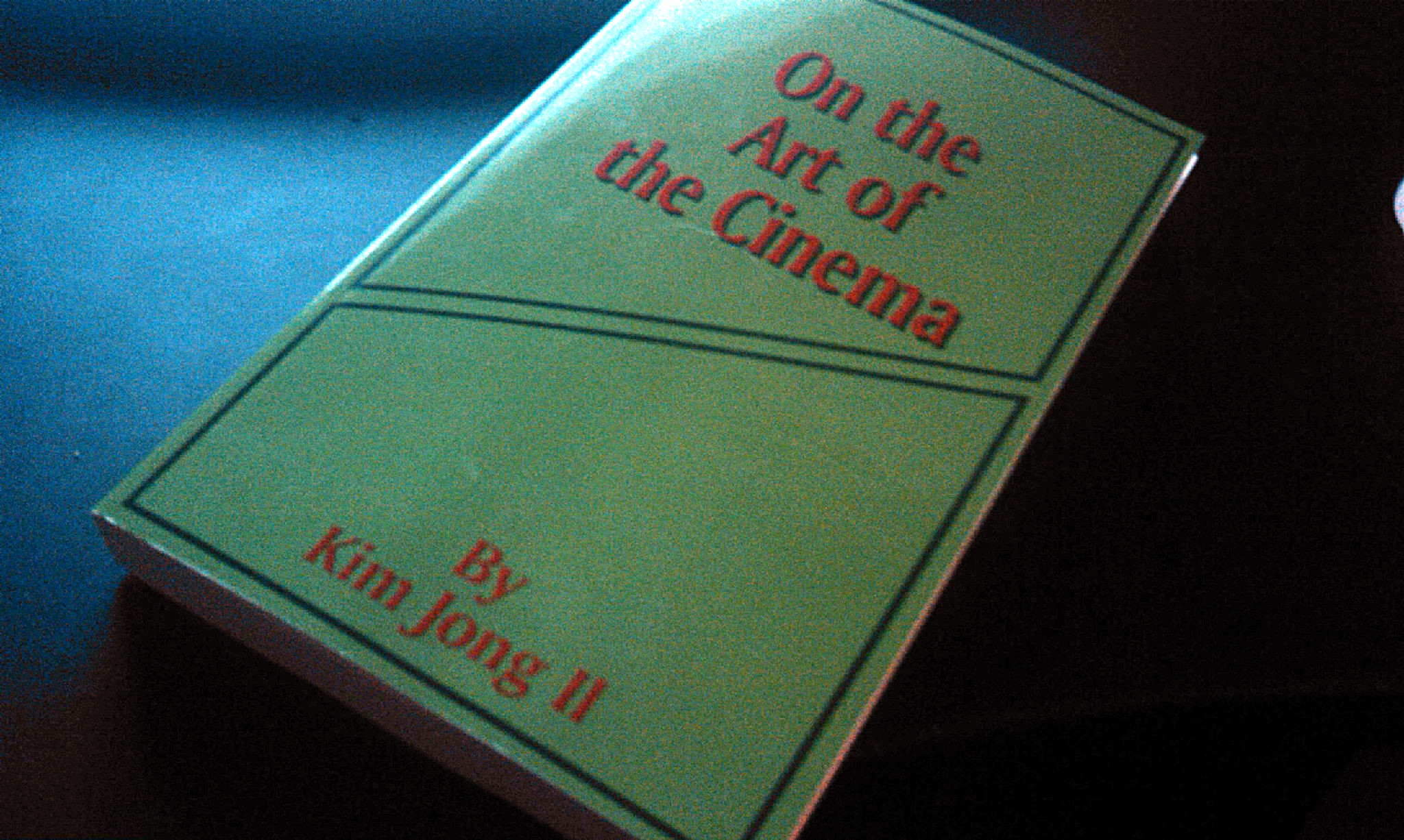
Reprint by University Press of the Pacific

The work is included in Selected Works of Kim Jong Il Vol. 5. (enlarged edition). The first three chapters of On the Art of the Cinema are also published as Life and Literature, The Cinema and Directing and The Character and the Actor, respectively. A reprint of the English edition of On the Art of the Cinema has been issued by University Press of the Pacific. Three speeches that were not included in the English editions – "Some Problems Arising in the Creation of Masterpieces" (1968), "Let Us Create More Revolutionary Films Based on Socialist Life" (1970), and "On the Ideological and Artistic Characteristics of the Masterpiece, The Fate of a Self-Defence Corps Man" (1970) – are included in the Korean edition from 1977.

Translations of On the Art of the Cinema include Arabic, Chinese, English, French, German, Russian and Spanish.

== See also ==
- Abduction of Shin Sang-ok and Choi Eun-hee
- Kim Jong Il bibliography
- On the Juche Idea
- Cinema of Korea
  - Cinema of North Korea
- Korean science fiction

== Notes and references ==
=== Works cited ===
- Clippinger, Morgan E. (March 1981). "Kim Chong-il in the North Korean Mass Media: A Study of Semi-Esoteric Communication". Asian Survey. 21 (3): 289–309. doi:10.2307/2643726. JSTOR 2643726.
- David-West, Alzo (January 2009). "The Literary Ideas of Kim Il Sung and Kim Jong Il: An Introduction to North Korean Meta-Authorial Perspectives" (PDF). Cultural Logic. 12: 1–34. ISSN 1097-3087. Archived from the original (PDF) on November 23, 2015.
- Fischer, Paul (February 3, 2015). A Kim Jong-Il Production: The Incredible True Story of North Korea and the Most Audacious Kidnapping in History. Penguin Books Limited. ISBN 978-0-241-96999-1.
- Kim Jong Il Biography (PDF). Vol. 1. Pyongyang: Foreign Languages Publishing House. 2005.
- Kwak, Dong Hun (March 2013). "Strategic Propaganda Through North Korean Films: A New Approach". Studia Universitatis Babeş-Bolyai, Philologia. 58 (1). National University Research Council: 231–244.
- Lee, Hyang-jin (2000). Contemporary Korean Cinema: Culture, Identity and Politics. Manchester: Manchester University Press. ISBN 978-0-7190-6008-3.
- Schönherr, Johannes (August 13, 2012). North Korean Cinema: A History. Jefferson: McFarland. ISBN 978-0-7864-6526-2.
