= Sea of Blood =

North Korean propagandist opera

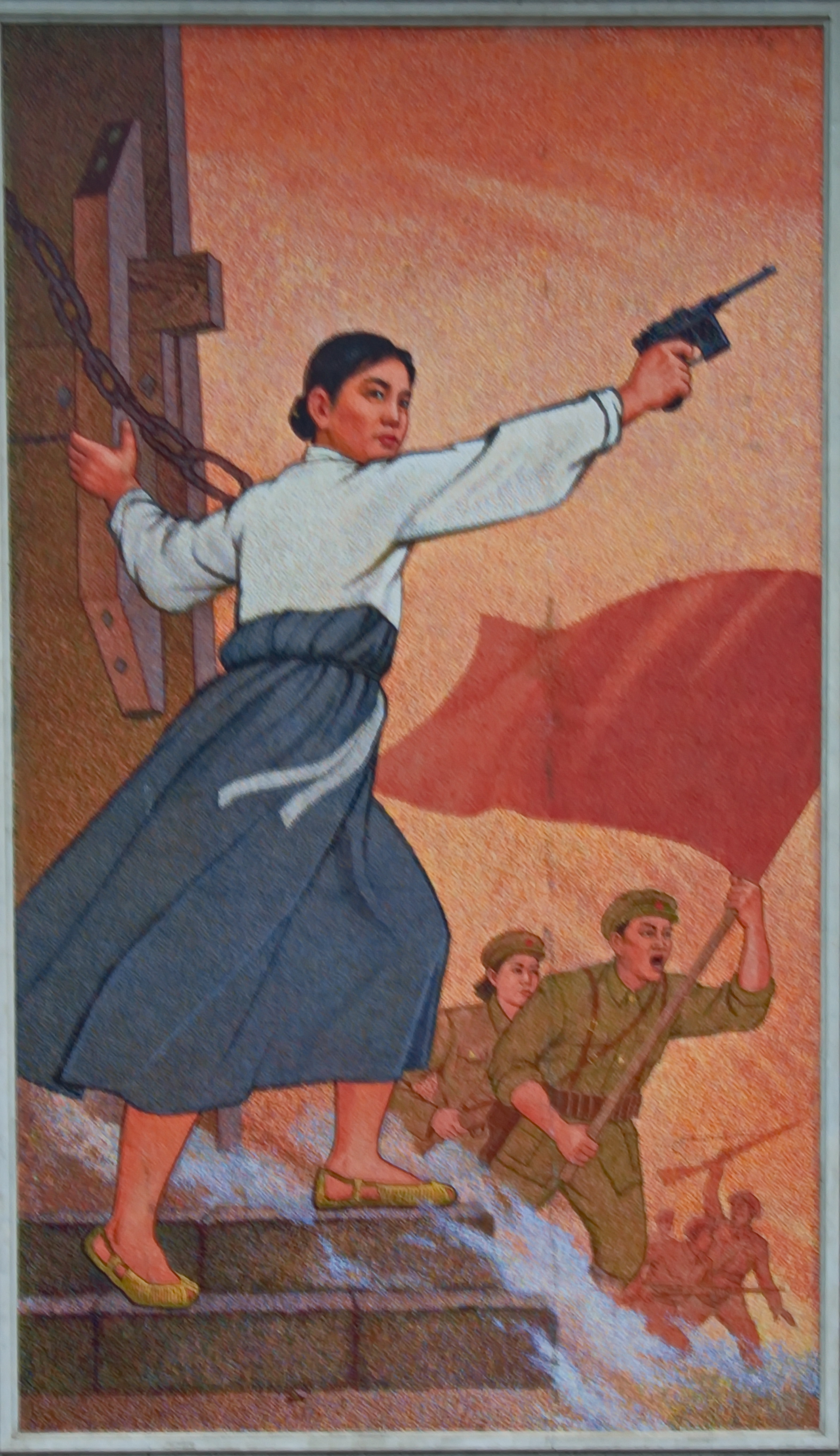
- Librettist: Kim Il Sung (attributed)
- Language: Korean
- Premiere: 17 July 1971; Pyongyang Grand Theatre

- Sea of Blood
- Hangul: 피바다
- RR: Pibada
- MR: P'ibada

Sea of Blood (Korean: 피바다) is a propagandist North Korean opera credited to Kim Il Sung. It was first produced as an opera by Sea of Blood Theatrical Troupe (Pibada Guekdan) in 1971. It was then later adapted into a novel by the Choseon Novelist Association of the 4.15 Culture Creation Group (조선작가 동맹 4·15문학창작단) in 1973.

== History and synopsis ==
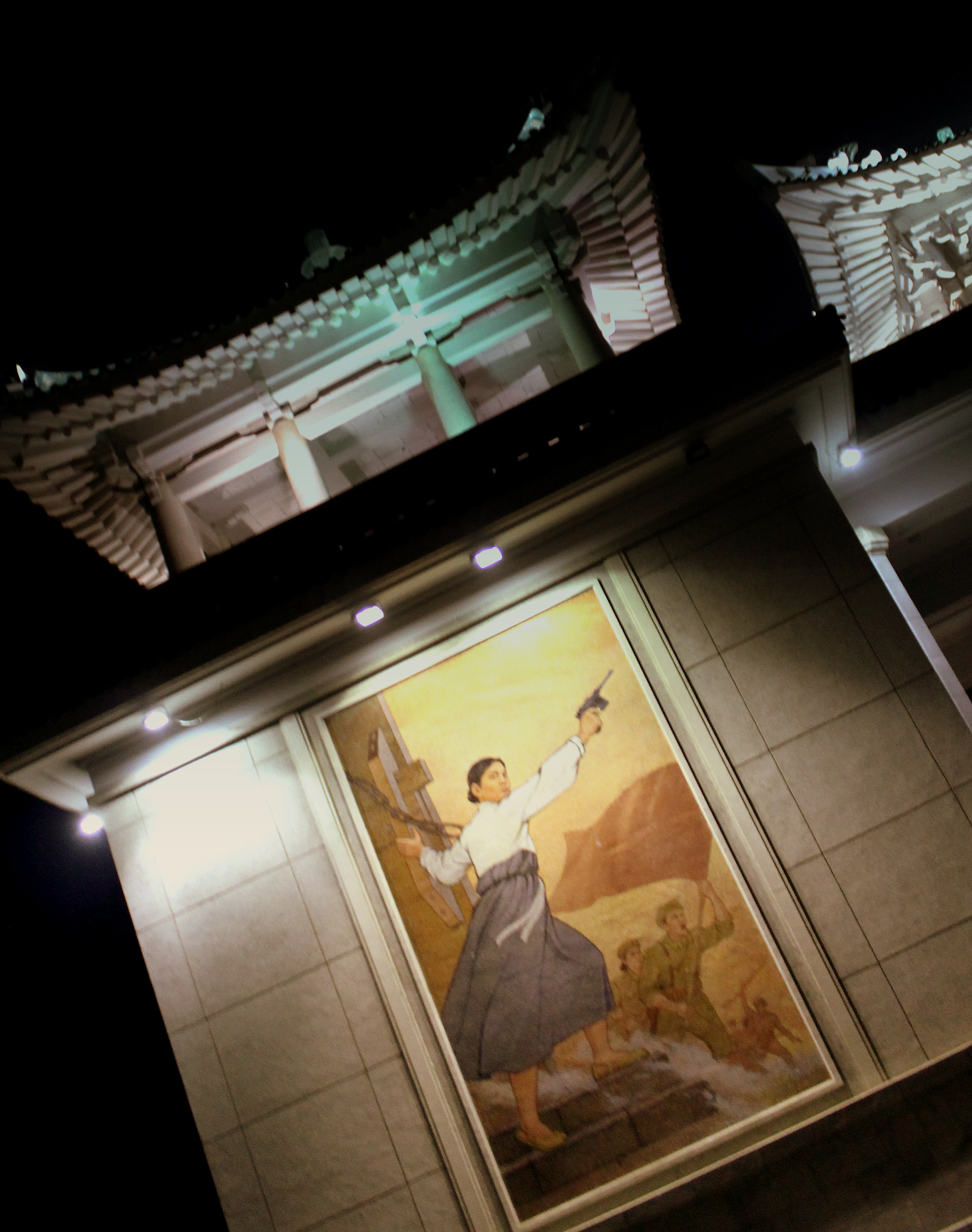
Scene from Sea of Blood painted as a mural at the Pyongyang Grand Theatre, where the opera was premiered

Sea of Blood is set in the 1930s, during the Japanese occupation of Korea and follows the life of protagonist Sun-Nyo and her family as they suffer numerous tragedies at the hands of the Japanese before eventually gaining the willpower and means to join the communist revolution and fight against their oppressors. The story is meant to exemplify the values of the Juche ideology, with self-reliance and solidarity being the central themes. The novel is notable for its highly detailed descriptions and lengthy narrations of each character's point of view as well as its graphic depiction of violence. It is also mandatory reading in North Korea's literature curriculum.

Along with The Flower Girl (꽃파는 처녀), Tell O' the Forest! (밀림아 이야기하라), A True Daughter of the Party (당의 참된 딸) and The Song of Mount Kumgang (금강산의 노래), Sea of Blood is considered one of the "Five Great Revolutionary Operas" (Korean revolutionary opera) (5대 혁명가극; 혁명가극), which are the five most critically acclaimed operas within North Korea with revolutionary themes. The opera is considered a masterpiece in North Korea since it expresses the unique aspects of the Juche regime's revolutionary ideology. It is also regarded as an exemplary revolutionary piece because of its unique use of visual and auditory effect and unprecedented theme, which was unlike other existing operas. The opera was influenced by Chinese model ballets like The White Haired Girl and operas like The Legend of the Red Lantern.

Sea of Blood premiered on 17 July 1971 at the Pyongyang Grand Theatre in the attendance of Kim Il Sung. The opera is known for being North Korea's longest-running production, having been staged over 1,500 times, and is presented three to four times a week at Pyongyang's main theater. It is also sometimes performed abroad. The North Korean Opera Troupe, which was established in 1946, was renamed "Sea of Blood Opera Troupe" shortly after the opera's release in 1971. Through being involved in the making of the opera, Kim Jong Il could systematize his thought on the art form. Many of the features of the opera are included in his treatise On the Art of Opera (1974), which lauds Sea of Blood as a model opera. On 20 October 1971, Chinese revolutionary masses and members of the Peking opera troupe visited Pyongyang to listen to a performance of the opera, the reviews were positive, with both the Peking Press and Guangming Daily giving rave reviews of the opera. On 22 October, the opera premiered in China and performed in Shenyang with positive reviews. The opera was performed another time on the 25th, this time in Nanjing to an audience of 3,000.

Sea of Blood was also produced as a four-hour black-and-white film. It was produced by Kim Jong Il and it was directed by Choe Ik-gyu.

== Literature ==
- The Novel. Sea of Blood, Pyongyang: Foreign Languages Publishing House, 1982

== See also ==
- The Flower Girl
- List of North Korean operas
