= Hong Young-hee =

North Korean actress (born 1955)

Kim Jong-il Prize Laureate People's Artiste of the DPRK Hong Young-hee
- Hong Young-hee on stage in October 2015.
- Born: Hong Young-hee; 15 September 1955 (age 71); Kaesong, Unhung County, Ryanggang Province, North Korea
- Other names: Star of the North; Hong Young-hui; Hong Yong-hee; Hong Yong Hui
- Education: Unhung Middle School
- Alma mater: Pyongyang University of Fine Arts
- Occupation: Actress
- Years active: 1972 – present
- Children: 2

Hong Young-hee (Korean: 홍영희; born September 15, 1955) is a North Korean actress and cultural figure. She is widely regarded as one of the most significant actresses in the history of North Korean cinema, primarily for her role in the 1972 revolutionary opera film The Flower Girl. She is a recipient of the titles People's Artiste and Merited Artiste, and her image was featured on the North Korean 1-won banknote for over a decade.

== Early life and education ==
Hong was born in Kaesong in 1955. She grew up in Unhung County, Ryanggang Province, where she graduated from Unhung Middle School in 1971. Before pursuing acting, she worked as a transport worker. She later attended an actor training class at the Korean Art Film Studio and eventually graduated from the acting department of the Pyongyang University of Theater and Film in 1976.

== Career ==
=== Breakthrough: The Flower Girl (1972) ===
Hong Young-hee's rise from a provincial transport worker to the most recognizable face in North Korea began in 1972. At the age of 16, while still a student at the Pyongyang University of Dramatic and Cinematic Arts, she was cast as Kkot Pun in the film adaptation of the revolutionary opera, The Flower Girl.

Her performance as a suffering but resilient peasant girl under Japanese colonial rule resonated deeply with audiences. The film became a massive diplomatic success, winning a special prize at the Karlovy Vary International Film Festival. Overnight, Hong became a national symbol, and the North Korean government awarded her the title of Merited Artiste while she was still a teenager—a feat virtually unheard of in the industry. The film's release in China turned Hong into a superstar there, where she was affectionately called the "National Sister".

=== The Icon on the Banknote ===
The cultural penetration of Hong's role as Kkot Pun was so profound that the North Korean Central Bank broke precedent by featuring her likeness on the 1-won banknote issued in 1992. Portrayed in the traditional chosonot she wore in the film, she became the literal face of the national currency for nearly two decades, cementing her status as a "living treasure" of the state.

=== Artistic Peak: The Fourteenth Winter (1980) ===
While The Flower Girl made her a star, the 1980 film The Fourteenth Winter (Korean: 열네번째 겨울) established her as a serious dramatic force. Playing Yu Sol Kyong, a character based on real-life scientist Paek Sol Hui, who dedicated 14 years to developing a new strain of winter-resistant rice, Hong portrayed a "hidden hero" of the revolution.

The film is famous for a production anecdote involving Kim Jong-il. During a vocal recording, Hong reportedly sang a passage with a slight rhythmic delay. Kim Jong-il, acting as the film's producer, famously intervened, stating that the "mistake" carried more genuine emotion than the original score. He ordered the entire song's time signature changed to accommodate her natural delivery, a story that is still used in North Korean media to illustrate his "genius" and Hong's intuitive talent.

Later she appeared in major roles in films such as We Met Again on Mt. Myohyang, The Man Remembered By My Heart, The Story of a Superintendent, The Girl Driver, and A Silver Hairpin, the latter being a co-production between the Korean Film Studio and the Chongryon which was shot in Japan.

=== Diplomatic and senior years ===
As the primary "cultural ambassador" for North Korean film, Hong represented the nation during rare periods of thaw. In 1990, she attended a joint North-South film screening in the United States, where she was the subject of intense South Korean media scrutiny.

Throughout the 1990s, she appeared in numerous installments of the multi-part epic Nation and Destiny, North Korea's most ambitious cinematic project. Hong remains a respected figure in North Korean arts. In 2015, she appeared in The 10 000 People Strong Grand Art Performance Celebrating the 70th Anniversary of the Workers' Party of Korea "Great Party, Rosy Korea", alongside other veteran actors. In 2020, she appeared on Korean Central Television to discuss the history of The Fourteenth Winter. In 2021, she gave an interview to the Chosun Shinbo, and in 2022, she participated in the 52nd National Arts and Sports Competition, recalling her first participation in the event 50 years prior in 1972.

=== Late career ===
In the 21st century, Hong transitioned into a mentor role. She is frequently seen at the Pyongyang International Film Festival, where she is treated with the highest level of reverence by both the public and state officials. In 2013, she was honored with the Kim Jong-il Prize, one of the highest awards for an artist in the country.

== Personal life ==
She is reported to have a 6th-degree familial relationship with the North Korean novelist Hong Guk-taek. Hong is married to a prominent musician and has two children. She lives in an elite neighborhood in Pyongyang. In 1990, she represented the DPRK film industry at a festival in New York, where she was interviewed by South Korean broadcaster KBS, confirming her status as one of the country's most protected and respected citizens.

== Filmography ==
=== Film ===
Year	Title	Role
1972	The Flower Girl	Kkot Pun
1978	What happened in the First Armed Ranks	Hong Yu
1980	The Fourteenth Winter	Yu Sol Kyong
1982	We met again at Mt. Myohyang	Jong A
1983	The Story of a Superintendent	Sim Hye Yong
1985	A Silver Hairpin	Su Hyang
1989	The Man Remembered By My Heartt	Jong Nam Hye
1989	The Girl Driver	Yun Hwa
1992	Nation and Destiny	Yong Hui
1996	The Path of Virtue	Bong Suk
1998	Party Membership Car	Ra Hyon Sim
2000	The Son is Back	Homeroom teacher
2003	Grandfather's Notes	Song Yong Kwan's wife
2004	Today's 10 Party Members	Mrs. Lim
2009	Baekdu's Bot Tree	Instructor
2010	Snow Scene	Kyong Ok
2011	The 9th Regiment	Yon Hui

== Awards and recognition ==
Due to her status as a top cultural figure, Hong has been involved in several major political events:

- In 1980, she awarded the title of People's Artiste following the success of The Fourteenth Winter.
- In 1980, she was awarded Order of the National Flag, First Class.
- In 1980–1981, she served as a delegate to the 6th Congress of the Workers' Party of Korea and the 7th Congress of the Socialist Patriotic Youth Alliance.
- In 1990, she represented the North Korean film industry at the North-South Film Festival, where she was interviewed by the South Korean broadcaster KBS.
- In 2009, she was selected to present flowers to Chinese Premier Wen Jiabao upon his arrival at Sunan Airport.
- In 2013, she became the first actor to receive the Kim Jong-il Prize.

== Cultural and political significance ==
From 1992 to 2009, Hong's likeness as the character Kkot Pun was featured on the 1-won banknote of the North Korean won. She is one of the few real individuals to appear on the nation's currency.

In 1990, she traveled to New York City for the "South-North Cinema Festival," a rare instance of a North Korean star interacting with Western and South Korean media. In 2009, she was chosen to present flowers to Chinese Premier Wen Jiabao during his visit to Pyongyang.
