= Choe Ik-gyu =

North Korean filmmaker and politician (born 1934)

- Born: 26 February 1934 (age 92); Hwadae County, North Hamgyong Province, Korea
- Education: Baccalaureate, Kim Hyong Jik University of Education (1954); Red Flag Mangyongdae Revolutionary School
- Occupations: Film director, politician
- Years active: 1955–present
- Employer: Korea Film Studio
- Notable work: Sea of Blood (1968); The Flower Girl (1972)
- Office: Minister of Culture
- Term: 2003–2006
- Political party: Workers' Party of Korea

Korean name
- Hangul: 최익규
- Hanja: 崔益奎
- RR: Choe Ikgyu
- MR: Ch'oe Ikkyu

Pseudonym
- Hangul: 최상근
- RR: Choe Sanggeun
- MR: Ch'oe Sanggŭn

Choe Ik-gyu (Korean: 최익규, born 27 February 1934), also known under the pseudonym Choe Sang-gun, is a North Korean film director, propagandist, and politician.

Choe became the head of the Korea Film Studio(조선영화소) in 1956 at age 22. By the time Kim Jong Il took over the country's film industry in 1968, Choe was the most experienced filmmaker of North Korea. Kim and Choe became close associates – Kim producing and Choe directing – a number of important North Korean films. Sea of Blood (1968) and The Flower Girl (1972) were "Immortal Classics" that, in addition to being popular successes, profoundly shaped the industry. By the end of the 1960s, Choe supervised film making in all of North Korea as the Propaganda and Agitation Department film section head. In 1972, his responsibilities covered other forms of North Korean propaganda as well after he was made the vice director of the Department.

In 1978, Kim had South Korea's famous director-actress couple Shin Sang-ok and Choi Eun-hee abducted to North Korea. Choe was tasked with aiding them to make films for North Korea. After Shin and Choi escaped in 1986 on a business trip in Vienna under Choe's watch, he was demoted. Kim Jong Il's trust in Choe would survive despite numerous incidents leading to the latter's dismissal from his posts. All in all, Choe has been sacked five times from the Propaganda and Agitation Department: first in 1969, then in 1977 as part of purges, in 1986 after the Vienna affair, in 1993, and finally 2010. He served as the country's Minister of Culture between 2003 and 2006. He finally became the head of the Propaganda and Agitation Department in 2009, but was replaced the following year. He remains a delegate to the Supreme People's Assembly.

Choe remained part of Kim's inner circle until the latter's death in 2011. Choe supported Kim's youngest son, Kim Jong Un's, ascension to the leadership of the country at a time when he was still an uncertain heir.

== Early and personal life ==
Choe Ik-gyu was born on 26 February 1934 to a poor family in Hwadae County, North Hamgyong Province, Korea. Choe graduated with a baccalaureate from the department of Russian literature of Kim Hyong-jik Teachers' College in 1954, and briefly became a lecturer of Russian at Kim Il Sung University's Pyongyang Labor Academy that same year. Choe also studied in the Soviet Union and graduated from the Red Flag Mangyongdae Revolutionary School in Pyongyang, at some point.

Choe is married and has a son and three daughters. His eldest daughter Choe Il-sim is an aspiring scenario writer, having written scripts for the five-part movie series The Country I Saw (1988–).

== Career ==
Choe began working at the Korea Film Studio, first as a deputy film director in 1955 and then as an independent director. He became the head of the studio in 1956 at the age of just 22. As a filmmaker, he was largely self-taught but aspiring. In addition to his formal education in arts, he now had much experience with the Stalinist model of making films in particular. Choe's breakthrough was the 1963 film A Garden Zinnia.

In 1968, Kim Jong Il, the country's future leader, took control of the country's film industry. Kim lacked experience in the field and so he teamed up with Choe, who was much experienced by this time and was "arguably the single North Korean most knowledgeable about film, other than Kim". Choe became Kim's closest partner in his activities related to film; his "film tutor". Their collaborations became immensely popular, Choe directing and Kim producing films that would become known as "Immortal Classics" and People's Prize winners. The first film Choe and Kim made together was Sea of Blood (1968), followed by Five Guerilla Brothers the same year. By the end of the decade, Choe had been appointed as a supervisor of the film industry section of the Propaganda and Agitation Department of the ruling Workers' Party of Korea.

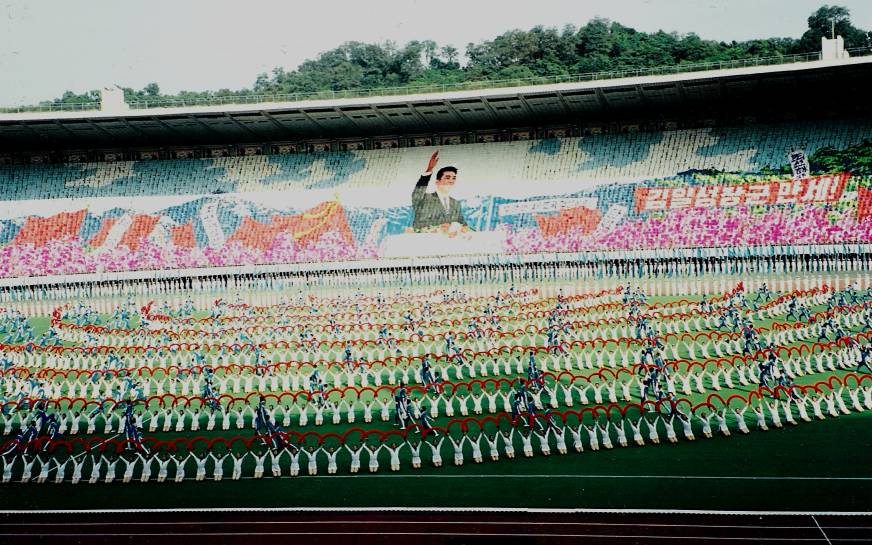
Mass games in Pyongyang, a recurring propaganda spectacle developed by Choe

In 1972, Choe and Kim released The Flower Girl, The film augmented Choe's position as Kim's close confidant, making him responsible for propaganda spectacles beyond film. Choe was promoted as the vice director of the Propaganda and Agitation Department and elected a member of parliament in the fifth Supreme People's Assembly. Choe was now in charge of events like Day of the Sun celebrations and Liberation Day marches. He developed mass games that would evolve into the Arirang Festival, the organizing of which he is still overseeing. Choe would also give artistic guidance to Korean revolutionary operas and plays. For instance, he had directed an operatic adaption of Sea of Blood in 1971. Choe and Kim's relationship became a close and long one. Choe would be personally involved in the making of many more films and supervising the production of others, such as multi-part The Star of Korea (1980–1987).

=== Abduction of Shin Sang-ok and Choi Eun-hee ===
Deputy Director Choe is the right person to help bring about change in our film industry. He is well versed in motion pictures. He is the best man for this work... But, as you can see, Deputy Director Choe can't do it all by himself.

— Kim Jong Il, explaining to Shin Sang-ok why he had been abducted, on a secret tape recorded by Shin

Choe Ik-gyu played a role in the abduction of Shin Sang-ok and Choi Eun-hee, a famous South Korean director-actress couple.

In a secret tape recorded by Shin and Choi, Kim Jong Il is heard confiding to the couple that he decided to kidnap them on the advice of Choe who considered Shin the best director of South Korea.

After years of separation, when Shin and Choi were re-united by their captor, Kim Jong Il, on 6 March 1983, Choe was present. He would work with Shin from that point on to direct movies for Kim Jong Il. He would pass on messages between Kim, Shin and Choi; the latter two rarely met Kim in person.

First, Choe accompanied Shin and Choi on a trip from Pyongyang to Moscow, East Germany, Hungary, Czechoslovakia, and Yugoslavia. The purpose of the trip was to scout for locations for the first film Shin had agreed to make for Kim Jong Il: An Emissary of No Return. Choe was discontent with the project. He had been an acclaimed film director in his own right, but now he had to mind his South Korean counterpart. Both Shin and Choi disliked Choe. Choe resorted to criticizing Shin's directing in front of the crew. Shin gained back control of the project by threatening to report to Kim Jong Il about Choe's behavior. The film was finished and would be played at the London Film Festival and Shin was to attend. Shin contemplated escaping there, but Choe and an entourage of bodyguards had traveled to London in advance.

After Shin and Choi had managed to escape in Vienna, Choe was demoted from his position in the Propaganda and Agitation Department. He was sent into the countryside, his exact whereabouts unknown for years.

=== Return to politics ===
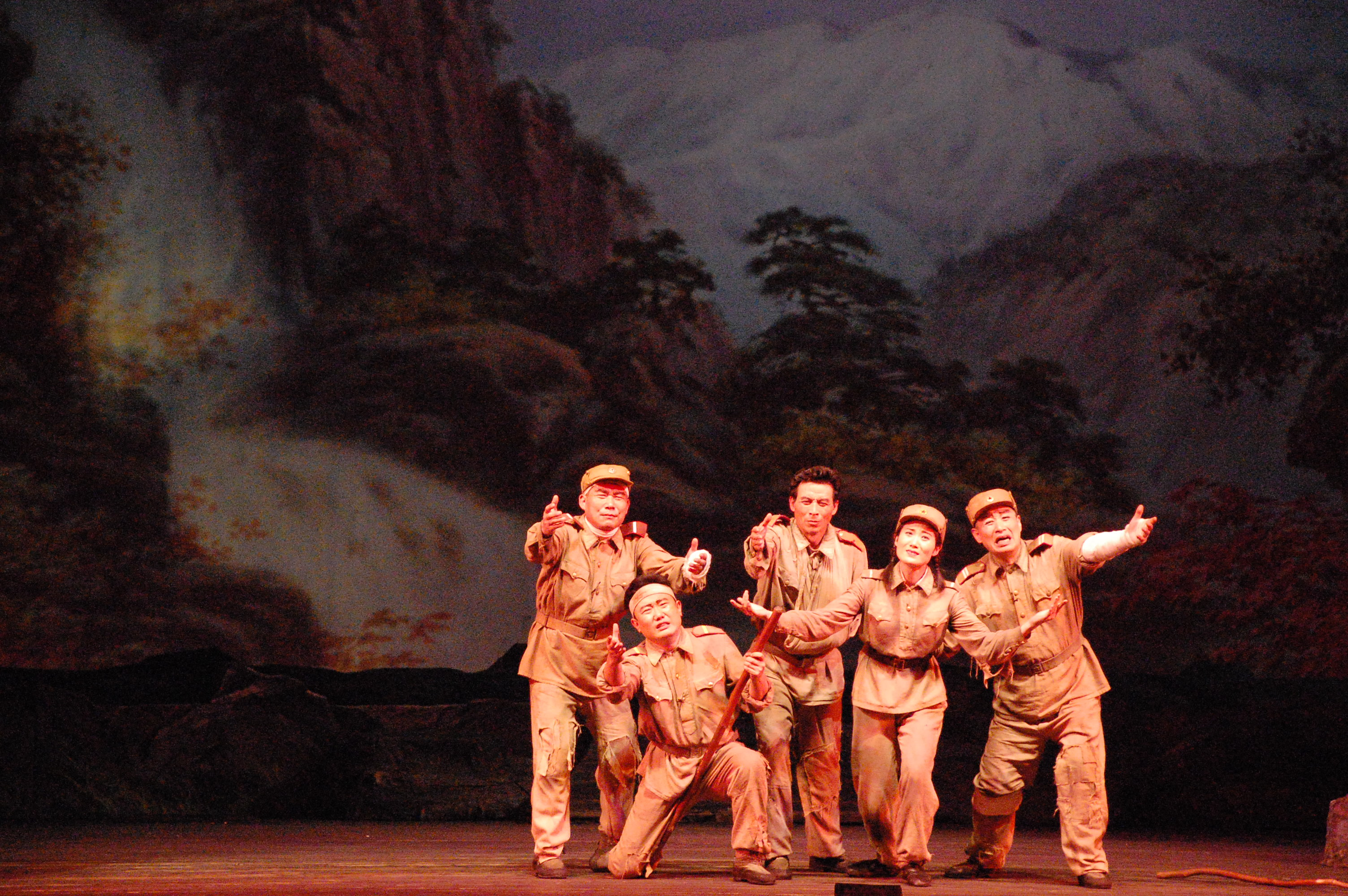
Korean revolutionary opera, an art Choe has been involved in as a director and cultural administrator

Choe Ik-gyu was allowed to return as the vice director of the Propaganda and Agitation Department in 1988. He assumed full control of the theater and operatic fields. That year, he was involved in making The Life of Chunhyang, an acclaimed folk opera. Choe guided performers "as if he were a stage director". Beginning with the early 1990s, Choe – credited under his pseudonym Choe Sang-geun – produced The Nation and Destiny. Choe produced, directed and wrote scenarios throughout the production of the 50-part film series, which Kim Jong Il considered the last work made under his personal guidance. Choe briefly fell out of public life in 1993 when he was dismissed from his Propaganda and Agitation Department post again. Even during this period, Kim Jong Il allowed him to travel to Germany to treat his health problems, which reflects the amount of trust Kim had in Choe. All in all, Choe has been dismissed four times from the Propaganda and Agitation Department.

Choe became the Minister of Culture in September 2003 but retired temporarily some two years later because of diabetes and other chronic health issues. He relinquished the position in 2006. Choe was elected to the 12th Supreme People's Assembly on 8 March 2009, representing Electoral District#73. He finally became the head of the Propaganda and Agitation Department in 2009. As the director of the Department, Choe was one of North Korea's propaganda chiefs. He was replaced by Kang Nung-su in early February 2010 for unknown reasons.

Choe was often seen accompanying Kim Jong Il on formal occasions until the latter's death in 2011. When traveling outside North Korea, Choe uses the name Choe Sang-geun. Such was the case for instance when he visited Seoul in South Korea in 2000 in the capacity of the counsel to the National Orchestra of North Korea.

=== Succession of Kim Jong Un ===
Choe was among those who vouched for the succession of Kim Jong Un at a time when his ascension to power remained uncertain.

In addition to Kim Jong Il, Choe would aid Kim's third wife Ko Yong Hui, and Jang Song-thaek.

Paul Fischer, the author of A Kim Jong Il Production, assesses that "[t]he modern North Korean state, which is a production, a display performance of its own, owes as much to Choe Ik-Gyu's taste and talents as it does to Kim Jong Il."

== Filmography ==
- A Garden Zinnia(백일홍) (1963)
- Sea of Blood (1968)
- Five Guerilla Brothers (1968)
- The Flower Girl (1972)

== Opera ==
- Sea of Blood (1971)
- The Life of Chunhyang (1988)

== See also ==
- Cabinet of North Korea
- Culture of North Korea
- Central Committee of the Workers' Party of Korea
- Politics of North Korea
- Cinema of North Korea
- Propaganda in North Korea
- List of North Korean films
