= List of North Korean operas =

This is a list of North Korean operas.

== List ==
- Sea of Blood
- The Flower Girl
- Tell O' The Forest!
- The Story of A Nurse
- A True Daughter of the Party
- Song of Mt. Kumgang
- Victory of the Revolution Is in Sight
- Sea of Love
- Under the Bright Sun
- The Tale of Chun Hyang
- The Tale of Sim Chong
- Morning Glow at Tuman Riverside
- Women of Namgang Village
- Blood at an International Conference

== See also ==
- Korean revolutionary opera
- Music of North Korea
