= Korean revolutionary opera =

Genre of opera in North Korea

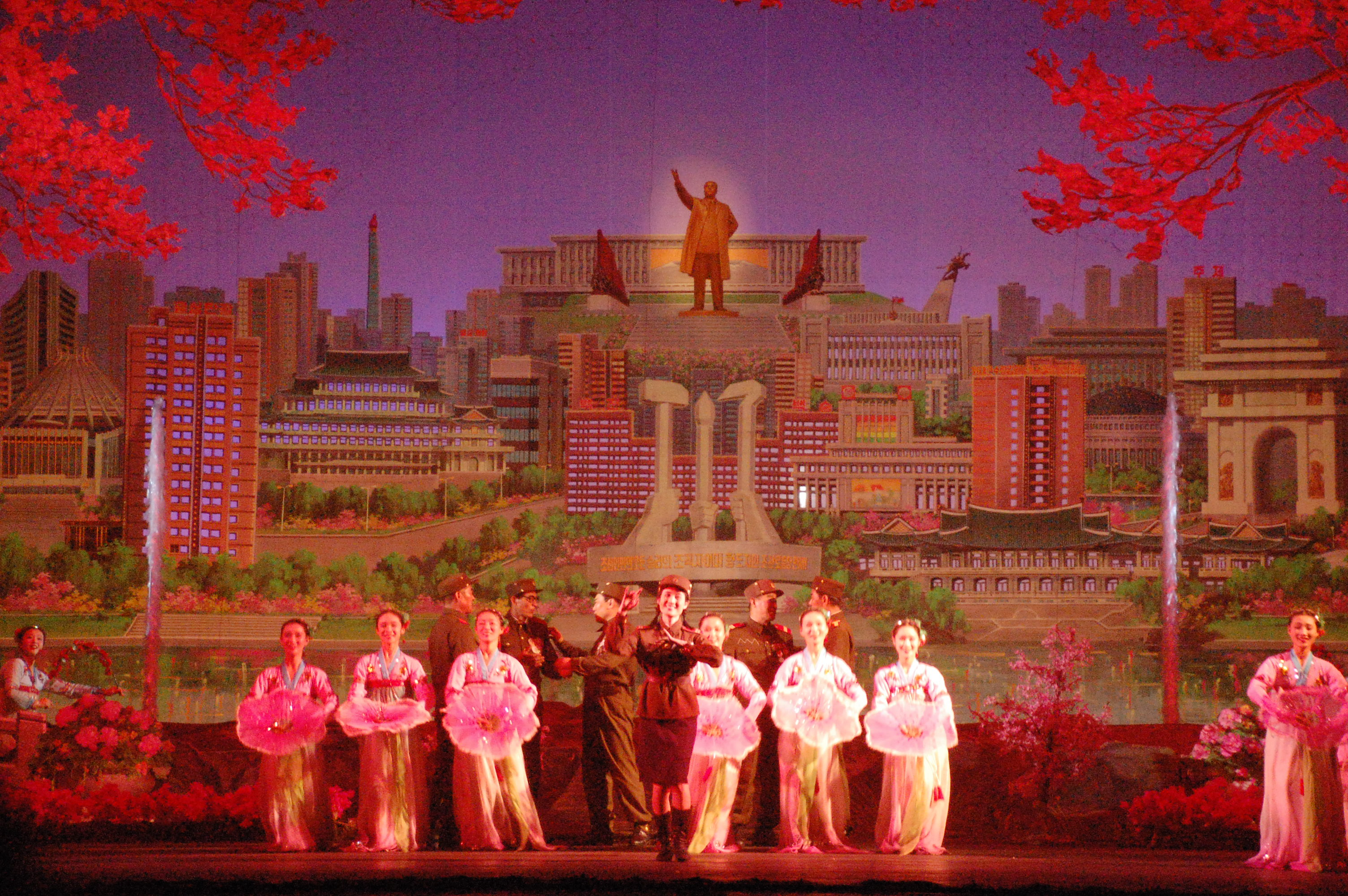
- An opera performance in Pyongyang

Korean name
- Hangul: 조선혁명가극
- Hanja: 朝鮮革命歌劇
- RR: Joseon hyeongmyeong gageuk
- MR: Chosŏn hyŏngmyŏng kagŭk

Korean revolutionary opera (Korean: 조선혁명가극) is a tradition of revolutionary opera in North Korea inspired by Chinese Revolutionary Opera which blossomed during the Cultural Revolution. It is characterized by a highly melodramatic style and reoccurring themes of patriotism and glorification of Juche, President Kim Il Sung, and the working people, as well as a focus on socialist realist themes. Composers of North Korean revolutionary opera are employed by the North Korean government and the fundamental principles of North Korean revolutionary opera were dictated by Kim Jong Il in his speech (later transcribed into a book) On the Art of Opera.

== History ==
North Korean revolutionary opera was preceded by the spread of propaganda songs that praised Kim Il Sung and the nation, which itself replaced p'ansori – traditional Korean theatrical song. North Korean revolutionary opera was highly influenced by the original form of revolutionary opera developed as part of the Chinese Cultural Revolution, including such works as Taking Tiger Mountain by Strategy and The Legend of the Red Lantern. North Korean studies scholar Alzo David-West writes that "Three of the alleged North Korean innovations in its national socialist realist musical theater are dynamic three-dimensional stage settings, stanzaic songs based on peasant-folk music, and panchang (an off-stage singing chorus), which in anti–Brechtian fashion constructs emotional links between character and spectator and controls the audience's interpretation of events. These appear in Maoist revolutionary opera". However, North Korean revolutionary opera differed in several ways, most notably in its use of traditional Korean instruments alongside Western orchestral ones, and its permitting the display of romantic love and supernatural or magical elements, both of which were banned in Cultural Revolution-era China.

The first revolutionary opera in North Korea, Sea of Blood, was premiered at the Pyongyang Grand Theatre in July 1971, with Kim Il Sung credited as the author and Kim Jong Il credited as producer. The opera is seen as the primary example of North Korean revolutionary opera, with many North Korean texts referring to revolutionary opera as "Sea of Blood-style" opera. Sea of Blood was adapted from a 1969 film of the same name. Kim Il Sung claimed to have written it with his comrades in a Chinese Communist Party (CCP) guerilla unit while fighting against the Japanese in occupied Manchuria, and performed it on a makeshift stage in a recently liberated village as a form of anti-colonial propaganda. However, the veracity of this claim is disputed due to the difficulty of finding accurate information about Kim Il Sung's early life and guerilla career.

Sea of Blood was followed by the rest of the "Five Great Revolutionary Operas": The Flower Girl, Tell O' The Forest!, A True Daughter of the Party, and The Song of Mount Kumgang. The five plays have been performed consistently at the Pyongyang Grand Theatre since their respective debuts, with Sea of Blood and The Flower Girl both having been performed over 1,000 times each.

Revolutionary opera flourished in North Korea as Kim Jong Il began to take charge of many aspects of the country, particularly its arts and propaganda programs. In September 1974, Kim Jong Il gave a "Talk to Creative Workers in the Field of Art and Literature" entitled On the Art of Opera, in which he described the most important principles of North Korean opera according to the regime. According to Kim, because opera combines music, dance, poetry, and theatre, it "constitutes a criterion for evaluating the level of a country". A good revolutionary opera must reflect the time it was produced in, and be guided "strictly by revolutionary principles". Revolutionary opera must also be emotionally affecting to the audience and be composed of beautifully poetic words and music.

New operas modeled after the five great revolutionary operas are continuing to be produced in North Korea. The operas have been performed outside of North Korea, with Sea of Blood and The Flower Girl gaining widespread popularity in China. Sea of Blood was performed on a two-month tour of China in May to July 2010, with many of the performances selling out.

=== Controversy in South Korea ===
In May 2007, used bookstore owner Kim Myeong-soo (Korean: 김명수) was arrested for selling copies of North Korean operas such as The Flower Girl and Sea of Blood. He was charged under Article 7, Paragraph 5 of the National Security Act which punishes those who ‘possess or acquire’ and ‘produce, transport, or distribute’ subversive material. After a lengthy trial, in which Kim had to attend court over 50 times, he was eventually acquitted on 30 March 2011. This law has stirred significant controversy in South Korea. It has been contested by the Constitutional Court on eight separate occasions since 1991, surviving each time.

== Form ==
The writers, actors, and directors of North Korean revolutionary opera, under the guiding hands of Kim Il Sung and Kim Jong Il, were instructed to produce an opera that was distinctly North Korean and distinctly different than previous forms of opera. According to Kim Jong Il, "The operatic style of feudalism or capitalism cannot serve the creation of operas for the working class who are now building socialism and communism, nor can the imitation of foreign things help in producing operas that cater to the aesthetic tastes and feelings of our people".

North Korean revolutionary opera, being a form of socialist realism, deals near-exclusively in political subject matter, extolling the virtues of the working proletariat, the glory of the socialist struggle, and the greatness of the Kim dynasty. Most are set in the formative period of the DPRK – either the Japanese occupation of Korea or the Korean War. The songs of North Korean revolutionary opera, unlike those of Western opera, are stanzaic in form, with main melodies often being repeated. This is in keeping with the aims of North Korean opera to be "a true art for the people", as Kim Jong Il states in On the Art of Opera. In order for opera to be able to reach the maximum number of people, throughout all of North Korea and beyond, the songs must be memorable and easily repeated, "composed in such a way that anybody can understand and sing", according to Kim.

Also central to North Korean revolutionary opera is the panchang, or off-stage song, describing the situation of the characters and their innermost thoughts and feelings. For example, in Sea of Blood, the panchang "The Mother Learns to Read and Write" is sung from offstage as the actor playing the mother is onstage performing the actions described. The song comments on the action and sings the praises of the mother as an ideal socialist and North Korean heroine. Kim Jong Il describes the panchang as "a powerful means of portrayal not present in the operas of the past", but the originality of the panchang is disputed, as scholars such as Alzo David-West have found similar innovations in Maoist revolutionary opera, as well as an obvious precedent in the chorus in classical Greek tragedy.

According to Jeffrey Arlo Brown:

North Korean revolutionary opera has some stylistic elements that make it easily recognizable. For one, it’s extremely repetitive. It contains an awkward mishmash of styles. Transitions between musical phrases are, almost exclusively, simple major and minor scales. There are many waltzes. Songs are accompanied by pizzicato strings à la [Gaetano] Donizetti. Facial hair is destiny: clean-shaven men are heroic; men with mustaches are evil; men with chin beards always seem like they’re imparting folksy wisdom. Women often suffer for the majority of the opera, and rarely seem to have much agency; they wail and moan and wear beautiful dresses. The film versions make liberal use of 1970s-style split-screen effects. Every opera has a dream scene with high flutes. There is hardly any vocal counterpoint—singers sing in unison, in octaves, or they take turns.

North Korean revolutionary opera makes heavy use of dance as well as singing, with performances often incorporating elaborate dances in the most important scenes to show both the action onstage and the characters' feelings. These dances are typically based on a long tradition of Korean folk dance, one of the few examples of a folk tradition that has remained relatively intact since the formation of the DPRK.

Sets and backdrops must be realistic and three-dimensional, and are typically lavish and elaborate, eschewing abstraction for reproduction of real life elements. However, sets must not only be a realistic approximation of the location, but also "describe the personality of the character living and working in that society", according to On the Art of Opera. The same principles are applied to makeup, props, and costuming.

North Korean revolutionary opera is typically performed with a mix of Western classical instruments and traditional Korean instruments, a style named "combined orchestra" (paehap kwanhydnak). In this, it is important that Korean instruments take precedence over Western ones, in order to ensure a distinctly Korean opera and to stay aligned with the values of the Juche ideology.

== The Five Great Revolutionary Operas ==
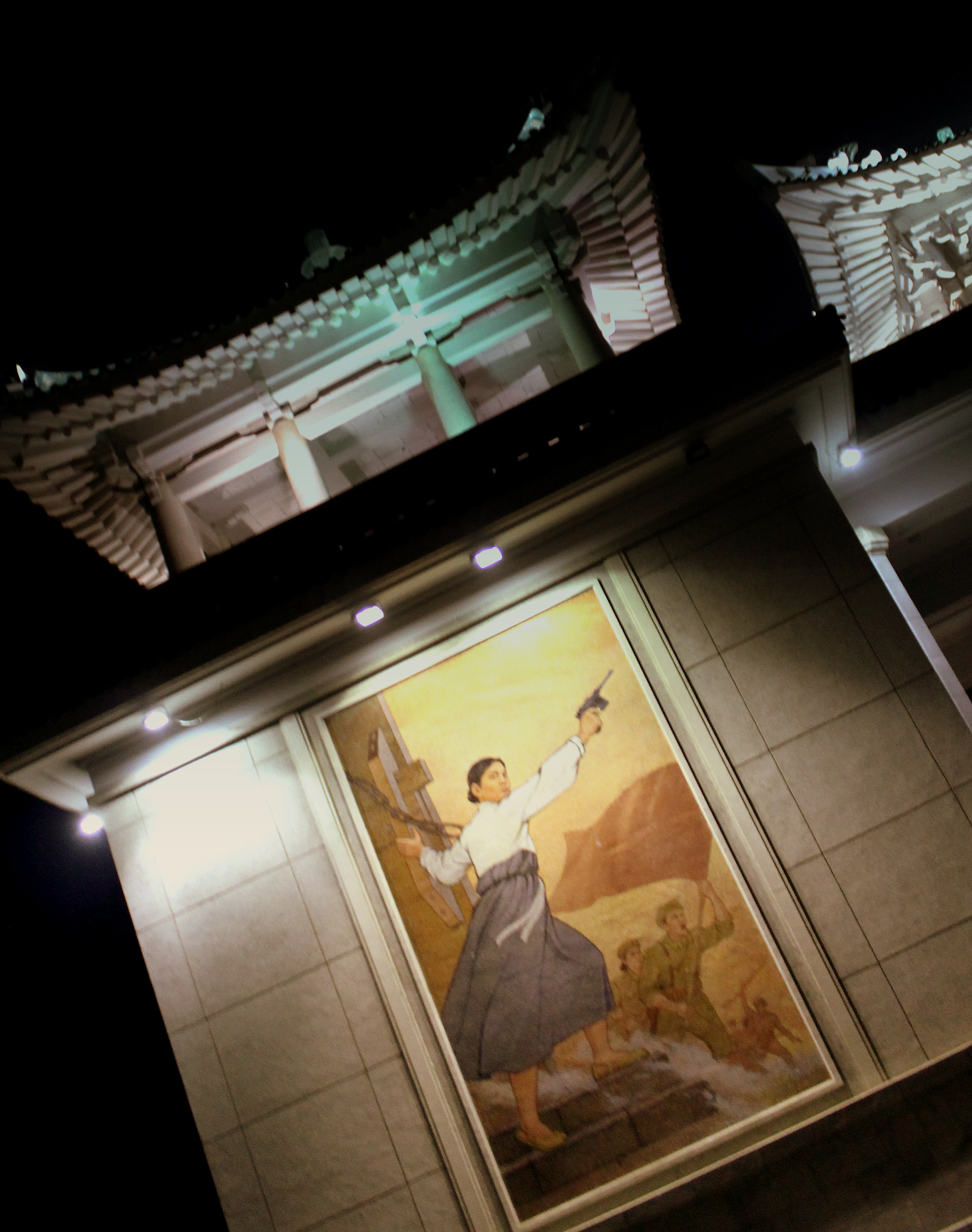
Scene from Sea of Blood painted as a mural at the Pyongyang Grand Theatre, where the opera was premiered

=== Sea of Blood ===
The most famous North Korean revolutionary opera, Sea of Blood, dramatizes the struggle of a Korean mother and her family in Japanese-occupied Manchuria in the 1930s, where Kim Il Sung was a guerilla fighter. The family is subject to many horrors under the Japanese regime, before they finally join the Communist revolution and destroy their oppressors. The title refers to the actions of the Japanese army which the hero describes as having "turned the country into the sea of blood".

=== The Flower Girl ===
The Flower Girl is also set during the Japanese occupation in the 1930s, though in Korea itself, not Manchuria. It tells the story of a poor flower-seller and her struggle against a greedy landlord, who is eventually overthrown by the people. It was also made into film.

=== Tell O' The Forest ===
Tell O' The Forest! is the story of Choe Byong-hung, a revolutionary who pretends to serve the Japanese during the occupation, but suffers the anger of the people of his village, who find his deception too convincing. His daughter commits suicide due to the shame of being "daughter of the puppet village head", after which Choe lures the Japanese forces into a trap in which he too perishes.

Tell O' The Forest was criticized by Kim Jong Il in On the Art of Opera for having the hero die before witnessing the moment of victory, as well as sticking to the "outmoded pattern" of using exclusively song, not a mixture of song and speech.

=== A True Daughter of the Party ===
A True Daughter of the Party is set during the Korean War, and follows Kang Yong-ok, a nurse and soldier against the American forces under the banner of the Korean People's Army. The main theme, "Where Are You, Dear General?", is a paean to General Kim Il Sung, credited to Kim Jong Il as composer. It was also adapted into a black and white movie - A Nurse's Story.

=== The Song of Mount Kumgang ===
Again, set during and after the Japanese occupation, The Song of Mount Kumgang tells the story of a family separated during the occupation who reunite twenty years later and live a joyful life under the new communist system. According to the DPRK description, "The opera represents the transformation of the mountain area, once worthless under the Japanese oppression, into the people's paradise through the portrayal of the local girls' joyful life and the hero Hwang's personal experience".

== See also ==
- List of North Korean operas
