= A True Daughter of the Party =

North Korean opera and film

- Korean revolutionary opera by Kim Jong Il
- Native title: 당의 참된 딸
- Librettist: Kim Jong Il
- Language: Korean
- Premiere: December 11, 1971

- A True Daughter of the Party
- Hangul: 당의 참된 딸
- Hanja: 黨의 참된 딸
- RR: Dangui chamdoen ttal
- MR: Tangŭi ch'amdoen ttal

A True Daughter of the Party (Korean: 당의 참된 딸; lit. 'To Truly become a Daughter of the Righteous Party') is a North Korean revolutionary opera. First performed in 1971, it is credited to Kim Jong Il.

The opera is considered one of the "Five Great Revolutionary Operas", a group of classical, revolution-themed opera repertoires well received within North Korea. A True Daughter of the Party is the only one of the five set during the Korean War.

It is performed with a male chorus, a smaller female chorus, with Western musical instruments, principally brass and strings.

== Plot ==
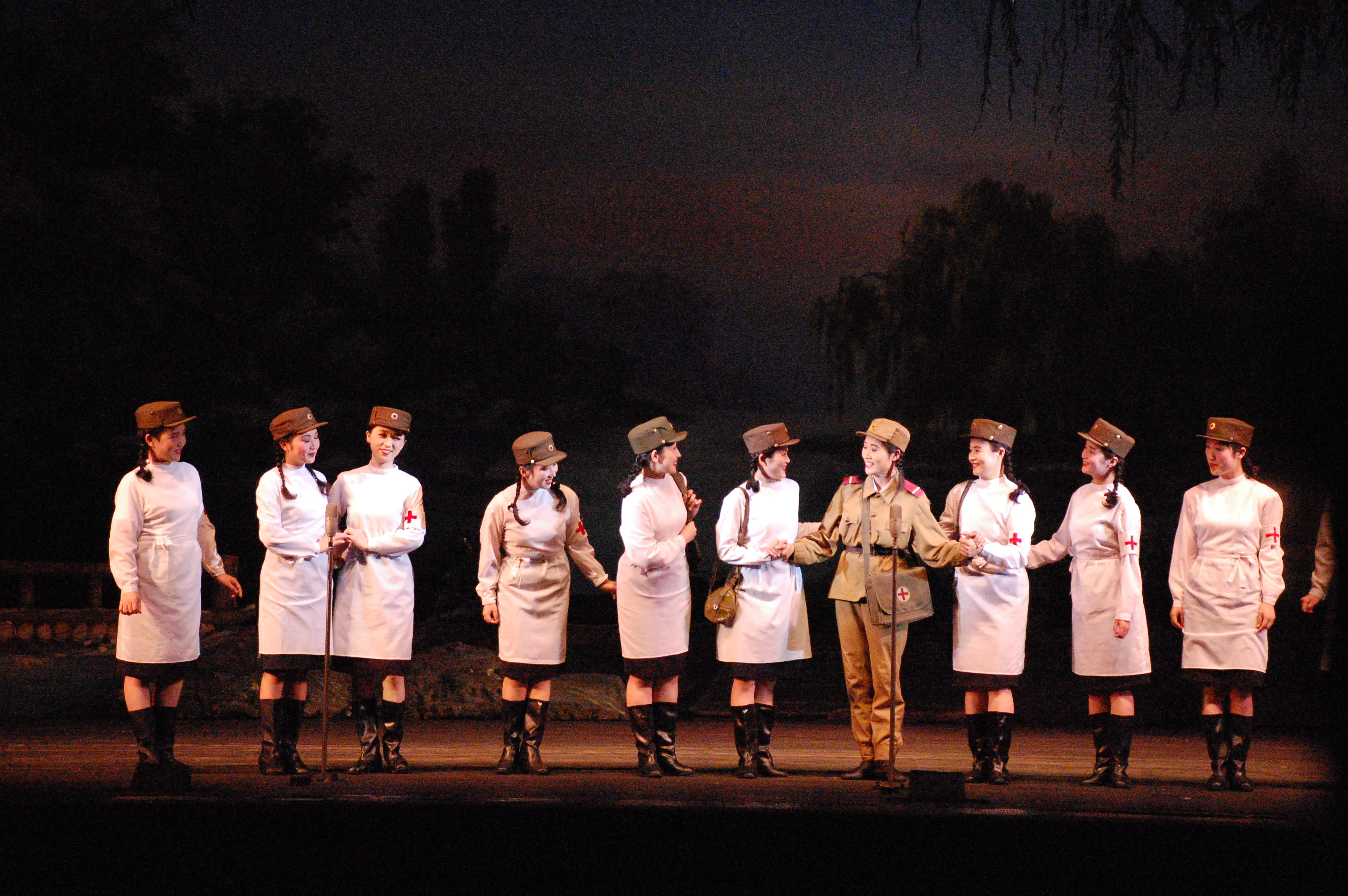
Kang Yon Ok (in military uniform) with her fellow nurses

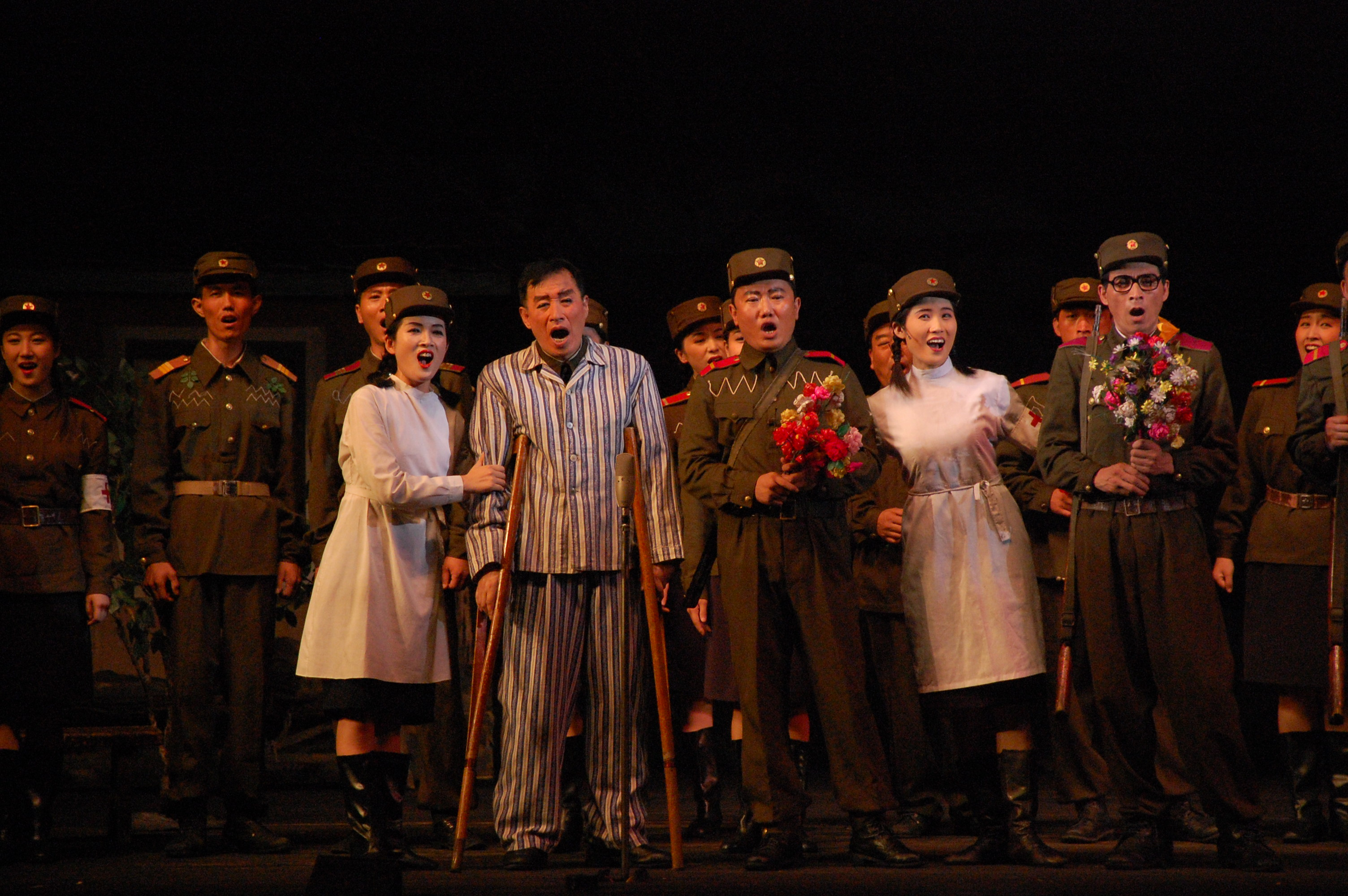
Yon Ok (foreground, first from left) with Myong Ho (foreground, second from left)

Kang Yon Ok is a nurse fighting in the Taebaek Mountains during the Korean War for the Korean People's Army. During the first offensive of the war, she is assigned the mission of escorting the wounded soldiers Choe Song Rim, Myong Ho, Chun Sam, and Gi Chang to a hospital deeper in the mountains.

The journey brings them into a village occupied by the KPA in which they are warmly received by the villagers. An old woman of the village thanks Yon Ok for saving her grandson Bong Chol, who is now able to go to school.

After continuing their journey further, the group hears the sounds of US Army military vehicles and they see that the US Army has set fire to the village. The wounded soldiers want to head off into the village to fight, but Yon Ok convinces them that they need to go to the hospital first and they reluctantly continue on the journey.

Close to the location where the hospital is supposed to be, the group sends out Yon Ok to tell the hospital staff that they will arrive soon, but when she arrives, she finds that the hospital is abandoned and finds writing on a rock that they are to proceed further into the mountains. Saddened by this she sings "Where Are You, Dear General?". The rest of the group arrives to find Yon Ok crying. Afterwards they decide to continue further, needing to cross a large river to reach the new location of the hospital.

At the banks of the river, the group encounters the villagers from the burned village. Bong Chol's grandmother tells Yon Ok that Bong Chol died in the fire. She also explains that the villagers are heading North to Pyongyang to live closer to Kim Il-sung. Together with the villagers they cross the river.

Shortly afterwards at a camp, Yon Ok finds Myong Ho, who has the most serious injury, struggling to breathe and injects him with her own blood to save his life.

Yon Ok realizes that the group is out of rice and sneaks out into a nearby village to obtain some from a peasant who supports the DPRK. Yon Ok prepares food with this rice, and while eating it with the group, falls asleep and dreams of the Supreme Headquarters.

During winter snowfall, the group arrives at the hospital and is warmly greeted by the staff. Yon Ok receives Party membership for completing her task.

Now in spring, Song Rim, Chun Sam, and Gi Chang are discharged from the hospital and are returning to the front, but Myong Ho, due to his serious injury, has to remain longer.

Myong Ho eventually regains his ability to walk because of Yon Ok's help. After he manages to walk without crutches again for the first time, Yon Ok receives the news that the grandmother of Bong Chol arrived in Pyongyang safely and also receives a letter from the front written by Gi Chang, in which he expresses his gratitude to Yon Ok and his wish for the group to reunite in Pyongyang after the end of the war. Yon Ok has a vision of that event, where the entire group, now decorated with medals, celebrates amidst many dancers.

On the day that Myong Ho leaves the hospital, everyone is in celebration, until it is cut short by an air raid, in which the sick ward catches fire. The nurses start evacuating the patients into shelter. As Yon Ok is carrying a patient she saved from the burning sick ward, a plane fires at them. She throws herself on the patient and is mortally wounded by the bullet. In her last moments, the hospital staff gathers around her and informs her that all the patients are saved.

She hands over her party membership card and her due for the month and tells Myong Ho to "kill as many Yankees as [he] can." and dies of her injuries afterwards. The crowd present mourns her death and she is carried away under a red banner

== Reception ==
The main theme, "Where Are You, Dear General?", is a paean to Kim Il Sung, credited to Kim Jong Il as composer; it was added to the opera by Kim Jong Il after he noted that A True Daughter of the Party was unpopular and that "the reason for its failure was that loyalty to the great leader was not brought into bold relief and that there was no suitable theme song."

The premiere of the opera, held in the evening of December 11, 1971 at the Pyongyang Grand Theatre, was attended by Kim Il Sung and other high-ranking statesmen and officials, including Kim Il, Pak Song Chol, Choe Hyon, O Jin U, Kim Man Gum, O Tae Bong, Choe Yong Jin, Paek Nam Un, Pak Yong Sun. The December 18, 1971 issue of The Pyongyang Times carried an article on the premiere, and described the audience's reaction as:

It deeply impressed the audience and won their high acclamation for its high ideological and artistic level.

== See also ==
- List of North Korean operas
- Culture of North Korea
- North Korean literature
- Korean War
- Korean People's Army
