= The Mysterious City =

1988 Cambodian-North Korean film by Norodom Sihanouk

- Directed by: Norodom Sihanouk
- Written by: Norodom Sihanouk
- Starring: Weun Kim; Sin Myeung-ouk; Jang Seun-hi; Yu Won-joun
- Release date: 1988
- Running time: 88 minutes
- Countries: Cambodia; North Korea
- Language: Korean

The Mysterious City is a 1988 Cambodian-North Korean film directed by Norodom Sihanouk, former King of Cambodia. The film tells the story of a Cambodian archaeologist setting out to find a mysterious temple discovered by a woodcutter within the Dângrêk Mountains.

It is Sihanouk's first among four films to be shot in North Korea.

== Cast ==
- Kim Weun as Prince Indra-Putra, an archaeologist
- Sin Myeung-ouk as Lieutenant Rithy
- Jang Seun-hi as Queen Shiva-Putri
- Yu Won-joun as General Brahma-Sena
- Hwang Hak-youn as Sok, a woodcutter

== Production ==
Filming began in May 1988 and ended in June the same year.
