= My Home Village =

1949 first North Korean feature film

- Title screen
- Hangul: 내 고향
- Hanja: 내 故鄕
- RR: Nae gohyang
- MR: Nae kohyang
- Directed by: Kang Hong-sik
- Screenplay by: Kim Sung Ku
- Starring: Yu Wonjun; Yu Kyongae; Moon Ye-bong
- Cinematography: Ko Hyong-gyu
- Production company: Korean Art Film Studio
- Release date: 1949
- Running time: 101 minutes
- Country: North Korea
- Language: Korean

My Home Village (Korean: 내 고향) is a 1949 North Korean propaganda war melodrama film directed by Kang Hong-sik. It is the first feature film to be made in North Korea after its 1948 establishment. The film portrays the liberation of Korea from Japanese colonial rule in 1945.

== Plot ==
The full film.

The film opens with a shot of Mount Paektu, the snow-capped volcano which is the holy mountain considered to be the origin of the Korean race, giving emotional basis for Kim's anti-Japanese guerrilla group. The story concerns Gwan Pil, a poor farmer who is deprived of his land by an evil landlord Choi Jusa and put in a Japanese prison while fighting with Indal, the son of landlord Choi. There he meets an agent of Kim Il Sung's Korean People's Revolutionary Army. The two stage a riot and break out of prison to join the guerrillas.

Meanwhile, Gwan Pil's fiancee Ok Dan is taken by the Japanese army. The guerrillas blow up a Japanese train which crashes through a railway bridge. Kim's army liberates Gwan Pil's home village and reunites him with Ok Dan, as he leads the fight to create a new society there.

There is no mention of America's defeat of Japan or of the Soviet invasion; the liberation of Korea is shown as the work of Kim Il Sung's guerrilla fighters alone.

== Background ==
Kim Il Sung, the leader of the Korean Communist Party during the fight to liberate Korea from Japanese colonialism, was determined that cinema should play a central role in "ideological guidance" of his newly liberated country and eagerly accepted Soviet funding and technicians to set up the National Film Production Center. Their first production was My Home Village.

The film was shot on 10 standard 35 mm film reels in black and white. Its running time is 101 minutes.

== Cast ==
- Yu Wonjun - Gwan Pil
- Yu Kyongae - Gwan Pil's mother
- Moon Ye-bong - Ok Dan
- Ul-min Tae - Choi Jusa, the landlord
- Pak Hak - In Dal, son of Choi Jusa

== Propaganda ==
North Korean sources tell that Kim Il Sung's son, Kim Jong Il, the future leader of the country, attended a preview of the film. Even at the age of seven, the story goes, he handed critical notes to the filmmakers pointing out that although there was snow falling, none could be seen on the heads or shoulders of the characters, and that the snow was clearly cotton wool, not real snow.

== See also ==
- List of North Korean films
