= The Song of Mount Kumgang =

North Korean opera and film

- Korean revolutionary opera by Kim Jong Il
- Native title: 금강산의 노래
- Librettist: Kim Jong Il
- Language: Korean
- Premiere: 1973

- The Song of Mount Kumgang
- Hangul: 금강산의 노래
- Hanja: 金剛山의 노래
- RR: Geumgangsanui norae
- MR: Kŭmgangsanŭi norae

The Song of Mount Kumgang (Korean: 금강산의 노래) is a North Korean revolutionary opera. First performed in 1973, it is credited to Kim Jong Il.

The performance is considered one of the "Five Great Revolutionary Operas", a group of classical, revolution-themed opera repertoires well received within North Korea.

The orchestra uses entirely Western musical instruments, except for some bamboo wind instruments.

== Plot ==
A family is separated during Japanese rule and reunite twenty years later, living a joyful life under the new communist system.

== Reception ==
According to the DPRK description, "The opera represents the transformation of the mountain area, once worthless under the Japanese oppression, into the people's paradise through the portrayal of the local girls' joyful life and the hero Hwang's personal experience".

== See also ==
- List of North Korean operas
- Culture of North Korea
- North Korean literature
- Korea under Japanese rule
- Korean People's Army
- Divided families in Korea
