= Korean Art Film Studio =

Film studio in North Korea

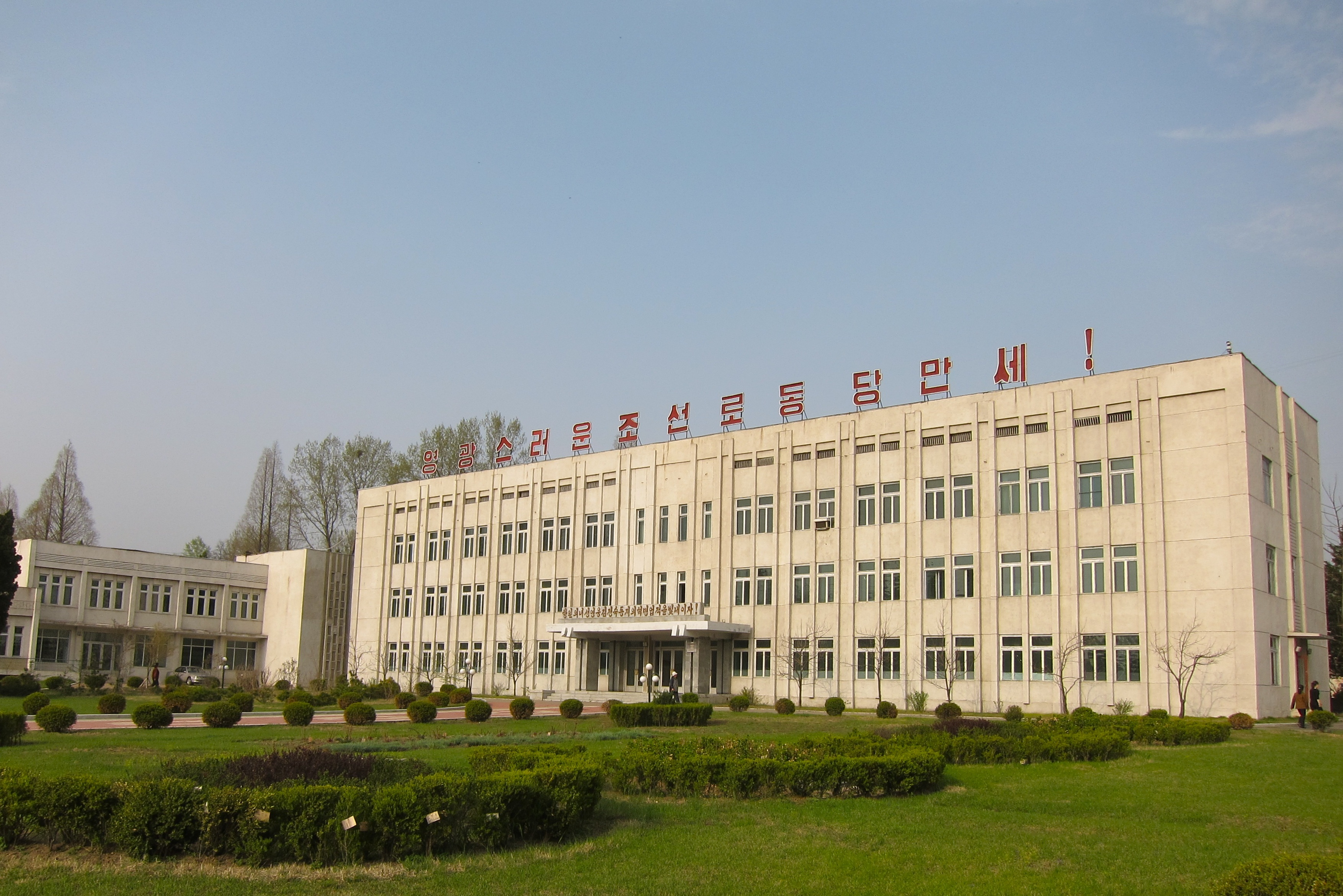

Korean name
- Hangul: 조선예술영화촬영소
- Hanja: 朝鮮藝術映畫撮影所
- RR: Joseon yesul yeonghwa chwaryeongso
- MR: Chosŏn yesul yŏnghwa ch'waryŏngso

The Korean Art Film Studio (Korean: 조선예술영화촬영소), also known as the Pyongyang Film Studio, is a film studio and production company in Pyongyang, North Korea. Founded in 1947 as the National Film Studio, it is the largest North Korean film studio, covering an area of over 1 million square meters. It has around 1,800 employees and is run by North Korea's Ministry of Culture.

The studio's debut was My Home Village (1949), the first ever feature film produced in North Korea following its establishment. According to Koryo Tours, the Korean Art Film Studio has since been involved in the production of hundreds of North Korean films.

== Selected films ==
- My Home Village (1949)
- The Girl of Mt. Kumgang (1959)
- The Song of a Communist Youth League Member (1964)
- The Destiny of Kum Nyo (1969)
- A Locomotive Engineer's Son (1971)
- The Flower Girl (1972)
- Their Lesson (1972)
- The Flying Circus (1972)
- The Fate of Kum Hui and Un Hui (1974)
- High-Tension Cables (1975)
- He is With Us (1976)
- A Young Man from the Factory (1976)
- The Secretary in Charge of the County Party (1982)
- The Pledge Made that Day (1982)
- The Kangnung Girl and the Pyongyang Boy (1983)
- A Straight Way (1983)
- The Masters of the Factory (1983)
- Pioneers (1984)
- The Road (1984)
- The First Year After the Wedding (1984)
- Pulgasari (1985)
- Pleasure (1985)
- Tomorrow is Forever (1985)
- Hong Kil Dong (1986)
- The Story of a Kayagum (1986)
- Kwangju Appeals (1986)
- Their Youth (1986)
- The County Party Secretary Chief (1987)
- Let's Go to Mt. Kumgang (1987)
- A Broad Bellflower (1987)
- Please Wait for Me (1987)
- Teacher's Appearance (1988)
- A Happy Day (1988)
- Their Day (1988)
- Communist Youth League Members (1989)
- After that Comrade Arrived (1989)
- Seeing the Appearance is Seeing the Inner Side (1989)
- Wind of the Year 1941 (1991)
- He Is Still Alive Today (1991)
- The Kind-Hearted Girl (1994)
- Youth Flourishing in Their Hometown (1994)
- She Was a Student (1996)
- The Family Basketball Team (1998)
- Family Parts 1-9 (2001)
- The Long-Awaited Girl (2001)
- The Family of Kubong Pass (2002)
- Kumjin River (2002)
- They Were Discharged Soldiers (2002)
- The Road to Follow (2003)
- The Noble Name (2003)
- A Letter From My Hometown (2003)
- The Man We Are Waiting For (2004)
- He Was a Coal Miner (2010)
