= Tell O' The Forest! =

North Korean opera and film

- Korean revolutionary opera by Kim Jong-il
- Native title: 밀림아 이야기하라
- Librettist: Kim Jong-il
- Language: Korean
- Premiere: April 22, 1972

- Tell O' The Forest!
- Hangul: 밀림아 이야기하라
- Hanja: 密林아 이야기하라
- RR: Millima iyagihara
- MR: Millima iyagihara

Tell O' The Forest! (Korean: 밀림아 이야기하라; lit. 'Rainforest, Speak!'; also translated Speak, O Forest; Tell, O Forest; Speak, Forest!) is a North Korean revolutionary genre theatrical performance. First performed in 1972, it is credited to Kim Jong-il.

The performance is considered one of the "Five Great Revolutionary Operas", a group of classical, revolution-themed opera repertoires well received within North Korea.

== Plot ==
Choe Byong-hung is a Korean patriot who pretends to serve the Japanese during the occupation. He suffers the anger of the people of his village, who find his deception too convincing. His daughter commits suicide due to the shame of being "daughter of the puppet village head", after which Choe lures the Japanese forces into a trap in which he too perishes.

== Reception ==
Tell O' The Forest was criticized by Kim Jong-il in On the Art of Opera for having the hero die before witnessing the moment of victory, as well as sticking to the "outmoded pattern" of using exclusively song, not a mixture of song and speech.

The 2019 Laibach song "Honourable, Dead or Alive, When Following the Revolutionary Road" is a re-interpretation of an aria from Tell O' The Forest! It was "prepared for the 2015 Liberation Day concert in Ponghwa Theatre in Pyongyang, but deemed too 'confusing' by the North Korean hosts and struck from the concert repertoire."

== See also ==
- List of North Korean operas
- Culture of North Korea
- North Korean literature
- Korea under Japanese rule
- Korean People's Army
- Ivan Susanin
