= The Flower Girl =

North Korean opera and film

- Title screen of the 1972 film adaptation
- Librettist: Kim Il Sung
- Language: Korean

- The Flower Girl
- Hangul: 꽃파는 처녀
- Hanja: 꽃파는 處女
- RR: Kkot paneun cheonyeo
- MR: Kkot p'anŭn ch'ŏnyŏ

The Flower Girl (Korean: 꽃파는 처녀) is a North Korean revolutionary genre theatrical performance, which was written by the country's leader Kim Il Sung. The performance is considered one of the "Five Great Revolutionary Operas", a group of classical, revolution-themed opera repertoires well received within North Korea. It was also made into a novel. A film adaption of the opera starring Hong Young-hee was made in 1972.

== Plot ==
The story is set during the 1930s, and is based on the anti-Japanese guerrilla movement during the period of Japanese occupation in Korea. The plot centers on Kkot-bun, a girl living under Japanese occupation who sells flowers on the street to help care for her sick mother and her little sister who was blinded by a landlord's wife. The landlord killed her father and Kkot-bun hopes for the return of her guerrilla fighter brother who has been imprisoned.

Eventually, she collects enough money to purchase medicine for her ill mother, but by the time she returns, her mother has already died. The landlord's wife becomes very sick, and suspects that the flower girl's blind sister is possessed by the spirit of her deceased mother, and so arranges for her to be frozen to death in the snow. When the flower girl returns home and asks where her sister has gone, the landlord's subordinates chain her up. At this moment, her brother, who has joined the Revolutionary Army, returns home to visit family when he realises that the flower girl has been locked up, and so organises a group of villagers to overthrow the landlord.

== Creation ==
The Flower Girl is based on a play written by Kim Il Sung in the 1930s while he was imprisoned by the Japanese, in Jilin. The first section of his 1992 memoir With the Century, entitled "Anti-Japanese Revolution", notes that:

There was a time during our country's independence movement where we held on to our vision to build an "ideal village" concept... At the time, we adopted the Korean students in Jilin to teach village people to sing a large variety of revolutionary songs, such as the Red Flag Song and Revolution Song. In Wujiazi we formed a performance group based at Samsong school led by Kye Yong-chun. It was during this time that I was completing the script for The Flower Girl, which I had started whilst I was in Jilin City. Upon finishing the script, production of the opera began, and we staged the opera in the Samsong school hall on the 13th anniversary of the October Revolution. For many years after liberation, the opera hadn't been performed since, until it was improved and adapted for film, and re-written as a novel, under the guidance of the Organising Secretary (Kim Jong Il) and released in the early 1970s. (Note: English translation of memoir is abridged from the original text for conciseness, and is based on the 1994 Chinese-language publication. Original memoir text from the Chinese-language version published in 1994, unabridged: "有一个时期，我国的独立运动者们抱着要建设一个"理想村"的构想，为实现这个构想从各方面作过努力……当时在吉林文光中学念书的朝鲜学生当中，有几个来自孤榆树和五家子的青年，他们常夸五家子是个好地方。因此，我就开始注意五家子，并决心把这个村改造成革命村。 1930年10月，我从东满来到五家子……当时，我们通过学生，给村里的人教唱了很多革命的歌曲。《赤旗歌》、《革命歌》等革命歌曲，只要到学校去教唱一次，当天就传遍全村。 五家子村有个由我们组织起来的演艺队。在桂永春的领导下，这个演艺队以三星学校为据点，积极开展了活动。 我也着手完成《卖花姑娘》的剧本。这个剧本，我在吉林市就已开始写，并已试演过几次。剧本一完成，桂永春就带领三星学校的戏剧小组成员开始排练。 在十月革命13周年纪念日那天，我们在三星学校礼堂演出了这出歌剧。这出歌剧解放后长期被埋没，到了70年代初，才在党中央组织书记的指导下，由我们的作家、艺术工作者改编成电影、歌剧和小说公诸于世。组织书记为此付出了很大的力量。" Alternate English translation provided by Korea-DPR.com (page 276 of 2161): "In Wujiazi we had formed an art troupe. This troupe was based at Samsong School and worked successfully under the guidance of Kye Yong Chun. I worked hard to complete the libretto of The Flower Girl which I had begun to write in my days in Jirin and then staged rehearsals for it. Once the libretto was finished, Kye started the production of the opera with the members of the drama group that had been formed at the school. We staged this opera in the hall of the Samsong School on the 13th anniversary of the October Revolution. This opera was not seen on stage for many years after liberation, and then was improved and adapted for the screen, re-written as a novel by our writers and artistes under the guidance of Organizing Secretary Kim Jong Il and presented to the public in the early 1970s. At that time the Organizing Secretary did a lot of work.")

The first official premiere of the opera production was held on November 30, 1972, in Pyongyang, where it was hailed as a great success.

According to official North Korean reports, in April 1968, Kim Jong Il suggested that another revolutionary opera, Sea of Blood, be adapted into a movie. Since then, other works have also been adapted into movies "under his guidance", with The Flower Girl also being adapted. The opera was intended to promote the communist ideology, by incorporating themes such as the class struggle against the bourgeois; such themes were similarly maintained in the film.

In April 1972, the film adaptation was officially launched. The film was directed by Choe Ik-gyu and the script was written by Pak Hak; Paekdu-san Group was responsible for the production of the film, which was filmed in color. The film was made in widescreen format, which according to Kim Jong Il (who oversaw the production), helped to show the emotional and psychological development of the characters.

== Reception ==
According to Paul Fischer, the author of A Kim Jong Il Production, "it is almost impossible to exaggerate" the importance of The Flower Girl to North Korea's cultural history. The film was immensely popular both domestically and abroad, particularly in China. It was the first North Korean film to win an international film award, at the 18th Karlovy Vary International Film Festival in 1972, and remained the only one until the 1980s. Writing for the British Film Institute, James Bell described The Flower Girl as "North Korea's Gone with the Wind".

As of 2008, the opera has been performed over 1,400 times in North Korea and more than 40 other countries, mostly Eastern Bloc states; other countries include France, Italy, Germany, Algeria and Japan. The title of the opera and film was known as Blomsterflickan in Sweden, Das Blumenmädchen in the German Democratic Republic, Kvetinárka in Czechoslovakia, and Kwiaciarka in Poland.

In South Korea, the film was deemed as communist propaganda and a symbol of the enemy, and screening was banned; police were often mobilised when university students were found playing the film on campus, and the students were often accused of being sympathetic to the North. In 1998, the Supreme Court of Korea ruled that The Flower Girl and six other North Korean films were "not favouring anti-ROK sentiments" in regards to national security laws.

The film made Choe Ik-kyu, the director, a confidant of Kim Jong Il. The film forged Hong Yong-hee into a film icon. She is depicted on the North Korean one won banknote, in her role as the flower girl.

On April 30, 1974, North Korea issued four postage stamps with scenes from the Flower Girl revolutionary opera and a miniature sheet, featuring the Flower Girl character herself with flowers.

=== In China ===
The opera and its film adaptation were both well received in the People's Republic of China when they were introduced there since September 9, 1972, the day both premiered, predominantly during the closing period of the Cultural Revolution and the beginning of the era of Deng Xiaoping's rule, where the production was known by the name of The Flower-selling Girl (Chinese: 卖花姑娘; pinyin: Màihuā Gūniang). A number of theatrical tours were made in China, which were performed in 1973, 1998, 2002 and 2008. In 2009, Chinese Premier Wen Jiabao was received by Hong Yong-hee during his visit to North Korea. In China, the film adaptation of the opera was dubbed by the Changchun Film Studio, based on translations by He Mingyan, who was earlier responsible in 1958 in the translation of the North Korean film adaptation of Chunhyangjeon. The entire translation process for The Flower Girl took only seven days. Although the dialogue was dubbed in Mandarin Chinese, song lyrics remained in Korean. As the film was played in Chinese cinemas during the period of the Cultural Revolution, the movie became immensely popular not just due to its proletarian revolution-based content but also since it was set in the 1930s - the same era as the beginning of the Japanese-held state of Manchukuo and during the years of the suffering of many Koreans in China under Japanese rule in the peninsula, to the point where theaters even adopted a 24-hour screening cycle because of high ticket sales.

The Flower Girl features prominently in Dai Sijie's Balzac and the Little Chinese Seamstress. In the movie and film, a village leader sends two sent-down youths to watch The Flower Girl and recount its plot to the rest of the villagers. The youths embellish their storytelling with details from prohibited European novels they have read and spellbind their audience.

== See also ==
- Sea of Blood
- List of North Korean operas
- Culture of North Korea
- North Korean literature
