= Pyongyang Grand Theatre =

Theatre in Pyongyang, North Korea

Coordinates: 39°00′31″N 125°45′01″E

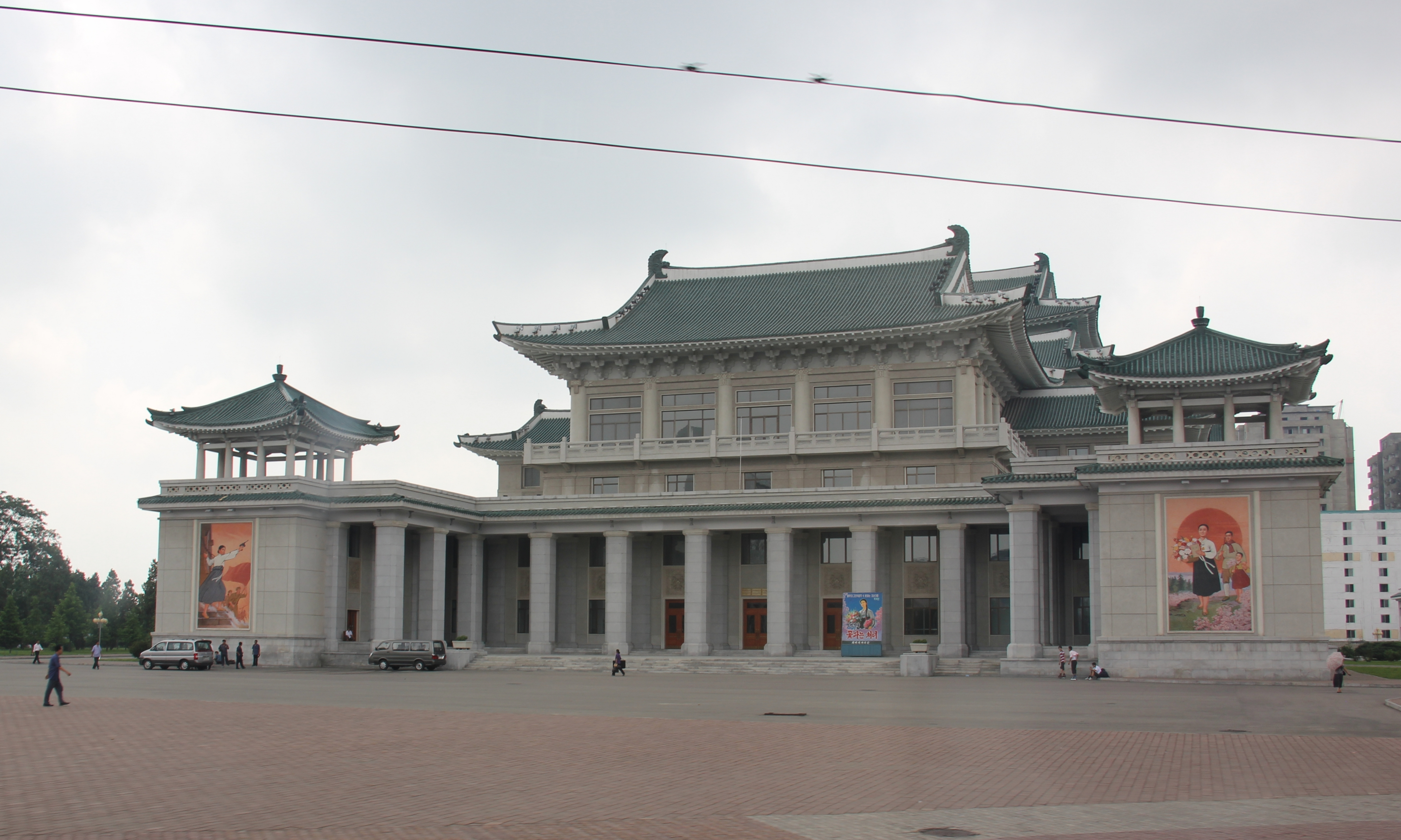

Korean name
- Hangul: 평양대극장
- Hanja: 平壤大劇場
- RR: Pyeongyang daegeukjang
- MR: P'yŏngyang taegŭkchang

The Pyongyang Grand Theatre (Korean: 평양대극장) is a theatre located in North Korea. It was opened in 1960.

== See also ==
- List of theatres in North Korea
