= China Girls' Mathematical Olympiad =

Chinese mathematics competition

- Traditional Chinese: 中國女子數學奧林匹克
- Simplified Chinese: 中国女子数学奥林匹克
Transcriptions
Standard Mandarin
- Hanyu Pinyin: Zhōngguó Nǚzǐ Shùxué Àolínpīkè

The China Girls' Mathematical Olympiad (CGMO) is a math competition with a proof-based format similar to the International Mathematical Olympiad. The competition is organized by the Chinese Mathematical Society. As girls are outnumbered by boys in mathematical competitions, this competition was created specifically for girls. The aim of the CGMO is to encourage more girls to study mathematics and to foster friendship. It was originally organized in 2002 for teams of girls representing different regions within China. The Chinese organizers decided to invite other nations to send teams of girls from their countries. The Philippines has participated since the first edition. Russia has participated at least since 2004. The United States participated in 2007–2012. Singapore has also participated.

The CGMO is held in mid-August and is hosted by a high school every year. Apart from the mathematical competition, girls also have a chance to learn aerobics and perform on stage.

The CGMO has inspired the creation of the European Girls' Mathematical Olympiad.

== Format ==
Each team consists of four high school female students. The competition is held on two consecutive mornings from 8:00 to 12:00. The contestants solve 4 problems on each day and each problem is worth 15 points.

== Awards ==
There are gold, silver and bronze prizes for individual contestants and a best team award.

Around 15 highest scoring girls are qualified to participate in the Chinese Mathematical Olympiad.

== Summary ==
#	Year	City	Co-organizer
1	2002	Zhuhai, Guangdong Province	Zhuhai Hope Star Experimental School
2	2003	Wuhan, Hubei Province	Wugang No.3 High School
3	2004	Nanchang, Jiangxi Province	Nanchang No.2 High School
4	2005	Changchun, Jilin Province	High School Attached to Northeast Normal University
5	2006	Ürümqi, Xinjiang Uyghur Autonomous Region	Xinjiang Bingtuan No.2 Middle School
6	2007	Wuhan, Hubei Province	No.1 Middle School Affiliated to Central China Normal University
7	2008	Zhongshan, Guangdong Province	Sun Yat-sen Memorial Secondary School
8	2009	Xiamen, Fujian Province	Xiamen Shuangshi High School
9	2010	Shijiazhuang, Hebei Province	Shijiangzhuang No.2 High School
10	2011	Shenzhen, Guangdong Province	No.Three Senior High School of Shenzhen
11	2012	Guangzhou, Guangdong Province	Guangdong Experimental High School
12	2013	Ningbo, Zhejiang Province	Zhenhai Middle School
13	2014	Zhongshan, Guangdong Province	Affiliated Zhongshan Middle School of South China Normal University
14	2015	Shenzhen, Guangdong Province	Shenzhen Senior High School
15	2016	Beijing Municipality	Beijing No.4 High School
16	2017	Chongqing Municipality	Chongqing No.8 Secondary School
17	2018	Chengdu, Sichuan Province	Sichuan Chengdu Shude High School
18	2019	Wuhan, Hubei Province	Wuhan Foreign Languages School
19	2020	Yingtan, Jiangxi Province	Yingtan Jiangxi No.1 Middle School
20	2021	Changchun, Jilin Province (virtual)	High School Attached to Northeast Normal University
21	2022	Tianjin Municipality (virtual)	Tianjin Nankai High School
22	2023	Xiamen, Fujian Province	Experimental Middle School Subsidiary of Xiamen University
23	2024	Chongqing Municipality	High School Affiliated to Southwest University

Owing to the COVID-19 epidemic, the 2021 and 2022 editions were held virtually.。
