= Chinese Mathematical Olympiad =

Chinese school mathematics competition

- Traditional Chinese: 中國數學奧林匹克
- Simplified Chinese: 中国数学奥林匹克
Transcriptions
Standard Mandarin
- Hanyu Pinyin: Zhōngguó Shùxué Àolínpīkè

The Chinese Mathematical Olympiad (Chinese: 中国数学奥林匹克; pinyin: Zhōngguó Shùxué Àolínpīkè) is an annual invitational mathematical competition for high school students in China organized by the Chinese Mathematical Society since 1986. Its participants are teams of high school students from every province of mainland China, as well as guest teams from the two special administrative regions Hong Kong and Macau, and also from Russia and Singapore. It is part of the selection process for the Chinese team to the International Mathematical Olympiad.

== Eligibility ==
To take part in the Chinese Mathematical Olympiad, high school students have to attain top positions in their own provinces in the National High School Mathematics Interprovincial Competition (Chinese: 全国高中数学联合竞赛), which is held on the second Sunday of September each year. Provincial mathematics societies often hold preliminary tests to pre-select students for the National High School Mathematics Competition, although these tests do not constitute a part of the official IMO team selection process. Then, based on the results, each province is allocated a quota to enter the Chinese Mathematical Olympiad. In early editions, the quota was usually 3 to 5 for a province, but could go up to 15 for strong provinces such as Beijing. The quotas have since increased significantly, for instance the quotas for the 2023 CMO ranged from 6 to 26, totalling about 550. Also invited to the CMO are past national training squad members who are still in high schools, and around 15 of the top contestants in the China Girls Mathematical Olympiad.

== Format ==
The Chinese Mathematical Olympiad follows the same format as the IMO. Two papers are set, each with 3 problems. The examination is held on two consecutive mornings, and contestants have 4 hours and 30 minutes each day to work on the 3 problems. The Chinese Mathematical Olympiad is graded in 3-point increments, so that each problem is worth 21 points, making the total score 126, triple that of the IMO.

== Awards ==
The Chinese Mathematical Olympiad has first, second and third class awards. There is also an award for the best team called "Chern Shiing-Shen Cup".

== National training squad ==
Currently, about 60 highest-scoring contestants amongst the first class award winners are invited to the national training squad, who will go through a training camp to select the IMO team. Until 2016, the training camp consisted of a single phase with several regular tests and a team selection test, which was in the format of the IMO. The IMO team was selected based on the final result, of which both the regular tests and the team selection test were worth 50%. Since 2017, the training camp has been split into two phases, held in two separate periods at two high schools. In each phase of the training camp that lasts for about 8 to 9 days, two team selection tests, each of the same format as the IMO, are conducted. In the first phase, 15 top scoring members are selected to the next phase, and at the end of the second phase, the six IMO team members are selected based on the total points of the four team selection tests. Members of the national training squad have guaranteed admission to any universities in China without sitting the Gaokao examination.

== History ==
China received the first invitation to the IMO from Romania in 1978, which was the first time its mathematics community learnt of it. Since having been invited to the 1981 IMO from the United States, the Chinese Mathematical Society had been preparing to participate in the IMO while waiting for approval from the China Association for Science and Technology. Upon hearing that the representatives of China had been asked again to join the IMO in a UNESCO meeting in Paris in April 1985, the leadership decided to join at the end of April, just two months before the IMO. The Chinese Mathematical Society then selected two students from Beijing and Shanghai using that year's American Invitational Mathematics Examination paper, and sent them to the 1985 IMO as a trial. At the 50th anniversary meeting of the society in December 1985, it was decided that a competition was to be held in January 1986 to select students to the IMO. It was called the National High School Mathematics Winter Camp. From 81 contestants, 21 were selected to the training squad, from which 6 were selected to the IMO Chinese team. In the 1990 Winter Camp, the "Chern Shiing-Shen Cup" was created with the donation by the renowned mathematician Shiing-Shen Chern. After hosting the IMO in Beijing in 1990, the Winter Camp was named the Chinese Mathematical Olympiad in 1991.

China has been sending its team to the IMO every year, except for the 1998 IMO held in Taipei, which the Chinese team did not take part due to serious cross-strait tensions.

The Chinese Mathematical Olympiad used to be held in universities. However, admission officers from other universities would come to recruit contestants, creating tensions with the hosting university. Thus, universities became reluctant to host the CMO. Since 2002, except in 2004, the CMO has been held in high schools to let the high schools take on a more active role. Regional mathematical competitions have also been started by high school alliances, such as the China Southeast Mathematical Olympiad and the China Western Mathematical Invitational. The Chinese Mathematical Olympiad has been moved from January to November or December of the previous year since 2013, so there were two editions of the CMO in 2013, one in January and one in December.

Due to the outbreak of the COVID-19 epidemic in early 2020, the training camp was not held and the Chinese team for the 2020 IMO was selected based on the scores of the 2019 CMO. The 2022 CMO was moved to a virtual event following the surge of COVID-19 epidemic in mainland China near the end of 2022, with contestants competing in the exam centers of their own provinces.

== Summary ==
#	Year	City	Co-organizer
1	1986	Tianjin Municipality	Nankai University
2	1987	Beijing Municipality	Peking University
3	1988	Shanghai Municipality	Fudan University
4	1989	Hefei, Anhui Province	University of Science and Technology of China
5	1990	Zhengzhou, Henan Province	Editorial office of the magazine Maths Physics & Chemistry for Middle School Students
6	1991	Wuhan, Hubei Province	Central China Normal University
7	1992	Beijing Municipality	Beijing Mathematical Olympiad Development Centre
8	1993	Jinan, Shandong Province	Shandong University
9	1994	Shanghai Municipality	Fudan University
10	1995	Hefei, Anhui Province	University of Science and Technology of China
11	1996	Tianjin Municipality	Nankai University
12	1997	Hangzhou, Zhejiang Province	Zhejiang University
13	1998	Guangzhou, Guangdong Province	Guangzhou Normal College
14	1999	Beijing Municipality	Peking University
15	2000	Hefei, Anhui Province	University of Science and Technology of China
16	2001	Hong Kong SAR	Chinese University of Hong Kong
17	2002	Shanghai Municipality	Shanghai High School
18	2003	Changsha, Hunan Province	First Middle School of Changsha
19	2004	Macau SAR	University of Macau
20	2005	Zhengzhou, Henan Province	Zhengzhou Foreign Language School
21	2006	Fuzhou, Fujian Province	Fuzhou No.1 Middle School
22	2007	Wenzhou, Zhejiang Province	Zhejiang Wenzhou High School
23	2008	Harbin, Heilongjiang Province	High School Affiliated to Harbin Normal University
24	2009	Qionghai, Hainan Province	Jiaji Middle School
25	2010	Chongqing Municipality	Chongqing Nankai Secondary School
26	2011	Changchun, Jilin Province	High School Attached to Northeast Normal University
27	2012	Xi'an, Shaanxi Province	Middle School Attached to Northwestern Polytechnical University
28	2013	Shenyang, Liaoning Province	Liaoning Shenyang Northeast Yucai School
29	2013	Nanjing, Jiangsu Province	High School Affiliated to Nanjing Normal University
30	2014	Chongqing Municipality	Bashu Secondary School
31	2015	Yingtan, Jiangxi Province	Yingtan Jiangxi No.1 Middle School
32	2016	Changsha, Hunan Province	Yali High School
33	2017	Hangzhou, Zhejiang Province	Hangzhou Xuejun High School
34	2018	Chengdu, Sichuan Province	Sichuan Chengdu No.7 High School
35	2019	Wuhan, Hubei Province	No.1 Middle School Affiliated to Central China Normal University
36	2020	Changsha, Hunan Province	Changjun High School
37	2021	Fuzhou, Fujian Province	Affiliated High School of Fujian Normal University
38	2022	Shenzhen, Guangdong Province (virtual)	Shenzhen Middle School
39	2023	Wuhan, Hubei Province	Wugang No.3 High School
40	2024	Ningbo, Zhejiang Province	Zhenhai Middle School, Ningbo Zhenhai Jiaochuan Academy (middle school)
