= Kim Yong-rim =

South Korean actress (born 1940)

- Born: March 3, 1940 (age 86); Keijō, Korea, Empire of Japan
- Education: Korea University - Graduate School of Mass Communication
- Occupation: Actress
- Years active: 1961–present
- Spouse: Nam Il-woo
- Children: Nam Sung-jin

Korean name
- Hangul: 김용림
- Hanja: 金容琳
- RR: Gim Yongrim
- MR: Kim Yongnim

Kim Yong-rim (Korean: 김용림; born March 3, 1940) is a South Korean actress. Kim made her acting debut in 1961 and has since worked steadily in Korean dramas, notably Silver Grass, for which she won the Grand Prize (Daesang) at the MBC Drama Awards in 1985.

== Filmography ==
=== Film ===
Year	Title	Role	Ref.
1979	The Sleep Deeper Than Death		
1980	Admiration of Nights		
1988	Love's Scribble	Mom	
1990	Oseam	Mother abbess	
1991	Black Snow	Ms. Baek	
2020	Honest Candidate	Mother-in-law	

=== Television series ===
Year	Title	Role	Ref.
1974	Paldogangsan: Where Flowers Bloom		
1975	Bride's Diary	Aunt	
1977	Why Do You Do That		
1977	I Regret It		
1978	Lawful Wife		
1978	Young Master	Housemaid	
1979	Become a Mountain and a River		
1980	Daughter		
1980	Terminal		
1981	Gyo-dong Madam	Queen Munjeong	
1981	Let's Love		
1982	Market People		
1982	Annals of Renunciation - Kim Gap-sun	Paek Son-haeng	
1982	Friend, Friend		
1982	Women's History - Hwang Jini		
1983	Your Portrait		
1983	Father and Son	Jinsa Choi's daughter-in-law	
1984	Love and Truth	Sang-hoon's mother	
1985	Silver Grass		
1986	500 Years of Joseon: "The Hoechun Gate"	Gang Hong-rip's wife	
1987	Love and Ambition	Park Tae-joon's mother	
1988	Forget Tomorrow	Mrs. Hwang	
1989	Sleepless Tree		
1989	Journal of Baekbeom	Kim Koo's mother	
1989	A Happy Woman		
1990	House with a Sunken Courtyard	Madam Noh	
1990	That Woman	Woman from Gyeongsan	
1991	The Beginning of the End		
1991	Women's Time	Choi Hee-soon	
1991	Dongui Bogam (Mirror of Eastern Medicine)	Heo Jun's mother	
1991	Beyond the Mountains	Jung-ah's grandmother	
1992	Gwanchon Essay	Min-gu's mother	
1993	How's Your Husband?	Go Min-ja	
1993	Woman's Mirror	Ma In-soon	
1993	Theme Series: "A Thing Called Love"		
1994	Mudang	Danggolne	
1994	Shoal	Mrs. Seo	
1995	Dazzling Dawn	Queen Sinjeong	
1996	Gomtang (Oxtail Soup)	Soon-rye	
1996	Daughter-in-Law's Three Kingdoms	Lee Jung-rye	
1996	Three Guys and Three Girls	Kim Yong-rim	
1996	Power of Love	Lee Soon-im	
1997	Women	Gi-nam's grandmother	
1998	Shy Lovers	Mother	
1998	Married 7 Years		
1998	I Hate You, But It's Fine	Kim Ae-gi	
1999	Trap of Youth	Mrs. Han	
1999	I'm Still Loving You	Hwang In-soon	
1999	Days of Delight	Woman from Hongsan	
2000	Ajumma	Oh Sam-sook's mother	
2000	Promise	Kwon Yong-soon	
2001	Well Known Woman	Jung Byung-hoon's mother	
2001	Empress Myeongseong	Grand Royal Dowager Queen Jo	
2002	Miss Mermaid	Geum Sil-ra	
2003	Wife	Ms. Song	
2003	Wedding Gift		
2003	A Problem at My Younger Brother's House	Kim Soon-ja	
2004	Lotus Flower Fairy	Ascetic Joo	
2004	The Age of Heroes	Jin-joo's grandmother	
2005	Three-Leaf Clover	Ryu Yeon-ja	
2005	The Barefooted Youth	Ms. Seo	
2005	My Girl	Jang Hyung-ja	
2006	One Day Suddenly	Yang Hye-sook	
2007	Bad Woman, Good Woman	Mrs. Song	
2007	Landscape in My Heart	Hwang Jung-sun	
2008	I am Happy	Kim Il-dong	
2008	Don't Be Swayed	Song Ok-boon	
2008	Aster	Lee Soon-shim	
2009	Again, My Love	Hwang Bo-seon	
2009	Two Wives	Jang Young-ja	
2009	Style	Lee Bang-ja (cameo)	
2010	Life Is Beautiful	Yang Byung-tae's mother	
2011	Ojakgyo Family	Shim Kap-nyeon	
2012	KBS Drama Special: "A Corner"	Lee Young-ae	
2013	You Are the Best!	Shim Mak-re	
2013	KBS Drama Special: "Mother's Island"	Mom	
2013	The Greatest Thing in the World	Woo Sun's grandmother	
2013	Thrice Married Woman	Mrs. Choi	
2014	Jang Bo-ri Is Here!	Park Soo-mi	
2014	Everybody Say Kimchi	(cameo)	
2014	Birth of a Beauty	Mrs. Park	
2015	Love on a Rooftop	Kim Soon-im	
2018	Memories of the Alhambra	Oh Young-shim	
2021	Hello, Me!	Lee Hong-nyun	
2022	Tomorrow	Yoo Bok-hee (Cameo, episode 13)	
2022	Three Bold Siblings	Yoon Gap-bun	
2024	The Brave Yong Su-jeong	Yong Soo-jung	

=== Web series ===
year	Title	Role	Ref.
2025	When Life Gives You Tangerines		

=== Television shows ===
Year	Title	Role	Ref.
2007	Big Mama	Cast member	
2013	Mamado ("Mama, Too")	Cast member	

== Awards and nominations ==
Year	Award	Category	Nominated work	Result	Ref.
1973	9th Dong-A Theatre Awards	Best Actress	The Lion in Winter	Won	
1985	MBC Drama Awards	Grand Prize (Daesang)	Silver Grass	Won	
1986	22nd Baeksang Arts Awards	Best Actress (TV)	Silver Grass	Won	
1997	34th Savings Day	Presidential Commendation	—N/a	Won	
1999	MBC Drama Awards	Special Award		Won	
2003	KBS Drama Awards	Best Actress in a One-Act/Special/Short Drama	Wedding Gift	Won	
2007	15th Korean Popular Entertainment Awards	Talent Partnership Award in Broadcasting		Won	
2010	SBS Drama Awards	Top Excellence Award, Actress in a Weekend/Daily Drama	Life Is Beautiful	Nominated	
2012	KBS Drama Awards	Best Actress in a One-Act/Special/Short Drama	A Corner	Nominated	
