= Kim Sung-keun (disambiguation) =

Kim Sung-keun (born 1942) is a South Korean baseball player and manager.

Kim Sung-keun may also refer to:

- Kim Song-gun (born 1945), North Korean painter
- Kim Sung-keon (born 1977), South Korean football player
