= List of North Korean inventions and discoveries =

This is a list of North Korean inventions and discoveries.

== Technology ==
- National intranet

North Korea's Kwangmyong is generally considered the first national intranet, launched in 2000.

== Science ==
=== Social science ===
- Juche

Juche, translated as "self-reliance" or "self-determination", is the state ideology of North Korea. Implemented in 1956, Juche follows the four principles of "autonomy in ideology, independence in politics, self-sufficiency in economy, and self-reliance in defense".

=== Physical science ===
- Vinylon

In 1939, vinylon, the second man-made fiber to be invented, after nylon, was developed by Ichiro Sakurada, Ri Sung-gi, and Hiroshi Kawakami at Kyoto University in Japan. However, the fiber was largely ignored until Ri Sung-gi defected to North Korea in 1950 and led its production. Vinylon is the national fiber of North Korea, and is used for the majority of textiles, outstripping fibers such as cotton or nylon.

== Alternative medicine ==
- Primo vascular system

The primo vascular system, also known as the Bong-Han system, is a new circulatory system described by Kim Bong-Han, a professor at the Pyongyang Medical University, in 1961. It is differentiated from the arteriovenous and lympathic systems by its unique anatomical and immunohistochemical signature. Originally named the "Substance of Kyungrak", Professor Kim proposed that the system represents the meridians and collaterals of acupuncture. The primo vascular system was purportedly confirmed in 2002.

== Music ==
- North Korean instruments

North Korea has developed many modernized instruments based on traditional instruments. The sohaegeum, junghaegeum, daehaegeum, and jeohaegeum are four-stringed fiddles of varying sizes, based on the traditional haegeum. The eoeungeum is a pear-shaped lute with 5 strings that is similar to the hyangbipa. The cheolhyeongeum and ongnyugeum are modernized zithers, and the jangsaenap is a modernized taepyeongso.
