= Jilin Yuwen High School =

- 吉林毓文中学

Location
- Jilin City, Jilin; China
- Coordinates: 43°49′44″N 126°31′56″E

Information
- Type: Public
- Motto: Develop morals. Spread knowledge. Cultivate talent. Promote character.
- Established: 1917
- Staff: 261
- Enrollment: 3213
- Website: www.jlyw.com

Jilin Yuwen High School (Chinese: 吉林毓文中学; pinyin: Jílín Yùwén Zhōngxué), also known as Yuwen Middle School, is a high school in the Chinese city of Jilin City, Jilin Province. The school is situated next to the Songhua River. The school was center of left-wing political thought during the 1920s.

Among prominent alumni is Kim Il Sung, the first leader of North Korea. There is a museum, a schoolroom memorial and a statue dedicated to him at the school. There is also a slogan proclaiming Sino-Korean friendship on the roof.

== History ==
The school was founded in 1917. The school was heavily influenced by left-wing ideology in the late 1920s, and was described as the most progressive in the city. Many prominent Chinese left-wing intellectuals have taught in the school, including Guo Moruo and Shang Yue.

In 1964 Deng Xiaoping allowed the school to continue use the name "Yuwen".

In 1978 Jilin Province officials approved Yuwen as the focus of the first run high school, and in 2003 the local government identified the school as a model high school.

Since 2005 there has been an international cooperation program with Australia. There have also been recent cultural exchanges with schools from countries such as United States and Japan.

=== Kim Il-sung ===
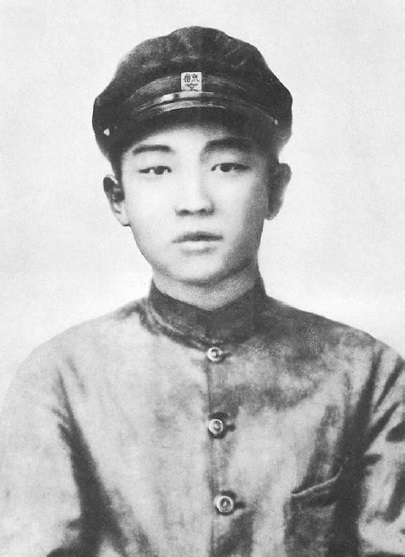
Kim Il-sung during his time in Yuwen Middle School

North Korean president Kim Il Sung attended the school for two and a half years starting from 1927. The school was described as the most progressive in the city of Jilin. Kim organized protests against "reactionary teachers" and Japanese-made goods in 1928. Kim was part of the South Manchurian Communist Youth Association there in 1929. Kim was arrested in the spring of 1929 and was consequentially expelled from the school.

Kim Il Sung struggled to continue his studies in Yuwen High School. He had to live in a cheap dormitory owned by the Methodist Church, as recalled by his younger friend from the school. Kim survived from his mother's modest earnings after his father died. Kim wrote in his memoirs that he tried to spare his only pair of shoes for school by walking barefoot. Kim also complained about the blatant nature of the class society of Jilin.

There is a bronze statue of Kim Il Sung, portraying him in a guerrilla uniform, at the school grounds. A schoolroom where Kim Il Sung studied is retained as a memorial, and there is a modest museum at the school.

Kim also studied in the Korean Huadian School (also known as Hwasong Middle School), which was also in Manchuria. When he chose to enroll in the Chinese-language Yuwen Middle School, he would have had other choices beyond Korean Huadian School, because there were other Korean language schools in Manchuria.

== Visits by North Korean officials ==
Since 1964 the Pyongyang Akinori school has been a sister school, and related visits have been received since then. A slogan on the roof of the building proclaims: "Long Live Sino-Korean Friendship".

In September 2010, North Korean leader Kim Jong Il made Yuwen Middle School his first stop during a trip to China. Kim stayed there for some 20 minutes. Only days later, upon his return, Kim pronounced his son Kim Jong Un as his successor. The visit to Yuwen associated with Kim Il Sung's youth thus became a political message of a young successor's viability. Premier Choe Yong-rim visited the school, too, in November 2010.

On 15 April 2014 around 400 to 500 North Koreans gathered at the school in honor of Kim Il-sung's birthday. Volleyball and other sporting events were held on the same day in Jilin. No Chinese officials attended, but Chinese security was present.

On 6 July 2014 officials from the DPRK's Shenyang consulate-general joined Chinese officials and Chinese-Koreans in a ceremony to lay floral baskets at Kim Il Sung's statue.

== People ==
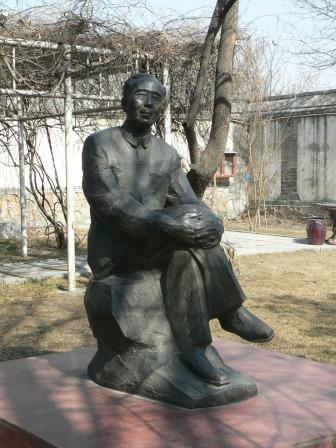
Teacher Guo Moruo is remembered for his work on archeology and history, as well as for his literary works and poetry.

=== Former teachers ===
- Chu Tu-nan
- Ma Jun
- Guo Moruo
- Shang Yue

=== Alumni ===
- Kim Il Sung
- Peng Huanwu
- Ma Zongjin

== Awards ==
- Teaching Quality and Improvement Award
- Excellent Teaching Achievement Award

== See also ==
- History of education in China#Republican era
- High School Attached to Northeast Normal University
- Jilin City No.1 High School
- Pyongyang Foreigners School
- Sprouts of capitalism, a historical theory of Chinese economics originally presented by teacher Shang Yue
