= With the Century =

Book by Kim Il Sung

- Cover page of the English edition of With the Century, Vol. 1
- Author: Kim Il Sung
- Language: Korean
- Subject: Kim Il Sung; Heads of state, Korea (North), biography; Korean resistance movements, 1905–1945
- Genre: Autobiography
- Published: 1992 (Korean ed.)
- Publisher: Pyongyang: Workers' Party of Korea Publishing House (Korean ed.); Pyongyang: Foreign Languages Publishing House (English ed.)
- Publication place: North Korea
- Media type: Print in eight volumes
- Pages: 3,447 (English ed.)
- OCLC: 28377167
- Dewey Decimal: 951.9303/092 B
- LC Class: DS934.6.K5 A3 1992

- With the Century
- Hangul: 세기와 더불어
- Hanja: 世紀와 더불어
- RR: Segiwa deobureo
- MR: Segiwa tŏburŏ

In a ruined country neither the land nor the people can remain at peace. ... A man who perceives this truth before others is called a forerunner; he who struggles against difficulties to save his country from tragedy is called a patriot; and he who sets fire to himself to demonstrate the truth and overthrows the injust society by rousing the people to action is called a revolutionary.

— From "My family", section one of "Land of Misfortunes", the first chapter of With the Century (Volume 1)

Reminiscences: With the Century (Korean: 세기와 더불어) is the autobiography of Kim Il Sung, founder and former dictator of North Korea. The memoirs, written in 1992 and published in eight volumes, retell Kim's life story through his childhood to the time of Korean resistance. Initially, a total of 30 volumes were planned but Kim Il Sung died in 1994 after just six volumes; the seventh and eighth volumes were published posthumously. The work reveals early influences of religious and literary ideas on Kim's thinking. An important part of North Korean literature, With the Century is held as an intriguing if unreliable insight into the nation's modern history under late colonial Korea. The book is considered one of a few North Korean primary sources widely available in the West and as notable research material for North Korean studies.

Authorship of With the Century is disputed, with some claiming that it was written by professional writers instead of Kim Il Sung himself.

== History ==
Until the 1960s, Kim Il Sung had encouraged his fellow revolutionaries to publish their memoirs, and generals such as Ŭlchi Mundŏk, Kang Kam-ch'an and Yi Sun-sin were featured in North Korean history books. Kim Il Sung's son and future successor Kim Jong Il, however, called back such biographies and sought to reinforce Kim Il Sung's cult of personality by controlling the works that made reference to him. In this regard, With the Century effectively replaced another work, Reminiscences of the Anti-Japanese Guerillas, as one of the most important propaganda pieces.

In 1974, Kim announced that he would write his memoirs. According to Kim himself, before that he had spared little thought about writing his memoirs. When Kim Jong Il assumed the office of Secretary for Organizational Affairs, Kim Il Sung was allowed more time to focus on his writing. Kim also describes being encouraged to write his memoirs by literary people and foreign statesmen. With the Century was written in 1992 when Kim was in his 80s, two years prior to his death. Initially the memoirs were supposed to span 90 chapters in 30 volumes comprising five parts: "The Anti-Japanese Revolution", "People's Country", "Along the Road of Socialism", "The Nation's Desire", and "Turning Point of Century". However, only the first six volumes of part one, "The Anti-Japanese Revolution", were completed before Kim's death and two additional volumes were published posthumously.

== Kim Il Sung's ideological influences ==
The memoirs suggest that Kim Il Sung was influenced by communism, Christianity, Confucianism, Cheondoism and wide range of other traditions. Kim Il Sung was born to a Presbyterian family, even though he downplays their devotion in his memoirs. The anti-foreign pro-independence Donghak Movement, founded by a Korean scholar Choe Je-u and influenced by Catholic missionaries, is one of the fascinations of his youth that Kim Il Sung treats at length in the memoirs. The Donghak rebellion served as a model for other contemporary Korean movements combining religion with nationalism. Kim Il Sung describes being intrigued by the native Korean Cheondoism movement that evolved from the Donghak rebellion. Cheondoism believes in the idea that all men are equal and bear the spirit of heaven in themselves.

The memoirs disclose that the Chinese Communist Party (CCP) member and author Sang Wol (Shang Yue) was Kim Il Sung's teacher in literary matters at private Yuwen Middle School in 1928, where Sang Wol taught for six months. This was young Kim's most decisive and the only formal educational influence on his background with both literature and esthetics. Sang Wol introduced Kim Il Sung to the classics of Chinese, and Russian literature such as Maxim Gorky's Mother and Enemies. Sang Wol encouraged Kim to become a 'proletarian writer'. Outside of school, Kim Il Sung also came into contact with Joseph Stalin's writings.

The memoirs reveal the impact of Kim Il Sung's knowledge of religion and scholarship of literary classics and art on the theory of Juche. Juche ideology has been interpreted as being similar to Cheondoism, as both think that people are the masters of their own fates. Despite the various early religious influences, Kim Il Sung frowned upon the practice of religion, and instead demanded near-religious loyalty and adherence to the militaristic rules that are part of living in North Korea. In the preface of With the Century, Kim writes: "'The people are my God' has been my constant view and motto. The principle of Juche, which calls for drawing on the strength of the masses who are the masters of the revolution and construction, is my political creed."

== Volumes ==
#	Title	Author	Publisher	Date	Genre	Length
1	Reminiscences: With the Century 1	Kim Il Sung	Foreign Languages Publishing House	1994 (English ed.)	Autobiography	357 pages (English)
Volume 1 includes the book's chapters for the time period between April 1912 – May 1930. Kim Il Sung tells about his childhood, youth and family in detail and how he came to join the communist rebels and the Korean independence struggle. His father Kim Hyong-jik was a member of the March 1st Movement, founding member of the Korean National Association, and actively resisting the Japanese when Kim Il Sung was still a child. The first volume ends with Kim Il Sung in prison.
2	Reminiscences: With the Century 2	Kim Il Sung	Foreign Languages Publishing House	1994 (English ed.)	Autobiography	466 pages (English)
Volume 2 includes the book's chapters for the time period between May 1930 – February 1933. After being released from prison Kim Il Sung is in the middle of the 30 May and 1 August uprisings at the unstable Manchuria under martial law. After the 18 September Incident Kim Il Sung and his comrades decide to prepare for the coming armed struggle. However, in the end after many battles, Kim Il Sung and his comrades-in-arms have to ponder the National Salvation Army's situation in Manchuria.
3	Reminiscences: With the Century 3	Kim Il Sung	Foreign Languages Publishing House	1993 (English ed.)	Autobiography	586 pages (English)
Volume 3 includes the book's chapters for the time period between February 1933 – February 1935. Kim Il Sung arrives at Wangqing where anti-Japanese struggle had been fiercer than in other areas. According to Kim Il Sung, at that time the nationalist trend in the struggle had changed into a communist struggle. The Japanese Kwantung Army was gaining the upper hand and independence fighters like the Northeast Anti-Japanese United Army had to withdraw towards the Soviet Siberian border.
4	Reminiscences: With the Century 4	Kim Il Sung	Foreign Languages Publishing House	1993 (English ed.)	Autobiography	477 pages (English)
Volume 4 includes the book's chapters for the time period between February 1935 – May 1936. As Kim Il Sung is exhausted by illness, the expedition to north Manchuria had ended in victory and the Korean communists had a new hope for developing the revolution. As Mao Zedong and Zhu De's communists have their 25,000-li journey, Kim Il Sung's comrades cross the Laoyeling Mountains. The first national united anti-Japanese body, the Association for the Restoration of the Fatherland, is founded at the foot of the Mount Paektu in May 1936 giving a new dawn for the national liberation.
5	Reminiscences: With the Century 5	Kim Il Sung	Foreign Languages Publishing House	1994 (English ed.)	Autobiography	414 pages (English)
Volume 5 includes the book's chapters for the time period between May 1936 – March 1937. Spring of 1936 had been an unusual and busy time, as the Association for the Restoration of the Fatherland was founded, the Mount Paektu base was being planned and established, and a new division was formed. However, two forces in the Fusong area were a threat: commander Wang's Manchukuo police and nationalist Wan Shun's anti-Japanese National Salvation Front's rebels. The latter half of the 1930s was the heyday of the Korean People's Revolutionary Army's activities.
6	Reminiscences: With the Century 6	Kim Il Sung	Foreign Languages Publishing House	1995 (English ed.)	Autobiography	407 pages (English)
Volume 6 includes the book's chapters for the time period between March 1937 – November 1937. Kim Il Sung decides to start an expedition to Fusong across the Changbai Mountains, and later on leads his comrades in the Battle of Pochonbo. As Kim Il Sung's troops were operating in Fusong and Mengjiang counties, the Japanese fabricated the Hyesan Incident, one of the most serious blows to the Korean revolution according to Kim Il Sung.
7	Reminiscences: With the Century 7 (Continuing edition)	Kim Il Sung	Foreign Languages Publishing House	2007 (English ed.)	Autobiography	333 pages (English)
Volume 7 includes the book's chapters for the time period between November 1937 – March 1940. In the winter of 1937, the Korean People's Revolutionary Army was training in the eastern part of the Mengjiang County at the secret Matanggou forest base. The last of the nationalist anti-Japanese forces were in decline, and about to join forces with Kim Il Sung. The Korean People's Revolutionary Army embarks on the Arduous March in late 1938 to relocate to Changbai County. According to Kim Il Sung, this was the bitterest time of the independence struggle.
8	Reminiscences: With the Century 8 (Continuing edition)	Kim Il Sung	Foreign Languages Publishing House	1998 (English ed.)	Autobiography	407 pages (English)
Volume 8 includes the book's chapters for the time period between March 1940 – August 1945. Kim Il Sung holds a conference in Xiaohaerbaling to adopt a new strategic policy, after having encircled and beaten the Maeda punitive force at the Battle of Hongqihe. Later on Kim Il Sung starts his final campaign for the liberation of Korea, and the Soviet Union invades Manchuria.

== Publication ==
The first six volumes of With the Century were published before Kim's death in 1994. The seventh and eight volumes were published posthumously. The volumes have been reprinted as part of at least two collections: the 50-volume Kim Il-Sung: Works (김 일성 저작 선집; Kim Il-sŏng chŏjakchip) and the 100-volume Complete Collection of Kim Il Sung's Works (김 일성 전집; Kim Il-sŏng chŏnjip). The volumes are also included with the North Korean made tablet computer Samjiyon. In addition to the full eight volumes, the electronic library on the tablet includes the 50-volume Works which holds the first 18 chapters of With the Century.

Translations exist in 20 languages, including Chinese, Japanese, English, French, Spanish, Russian, German and Arabic.

== Reception ==
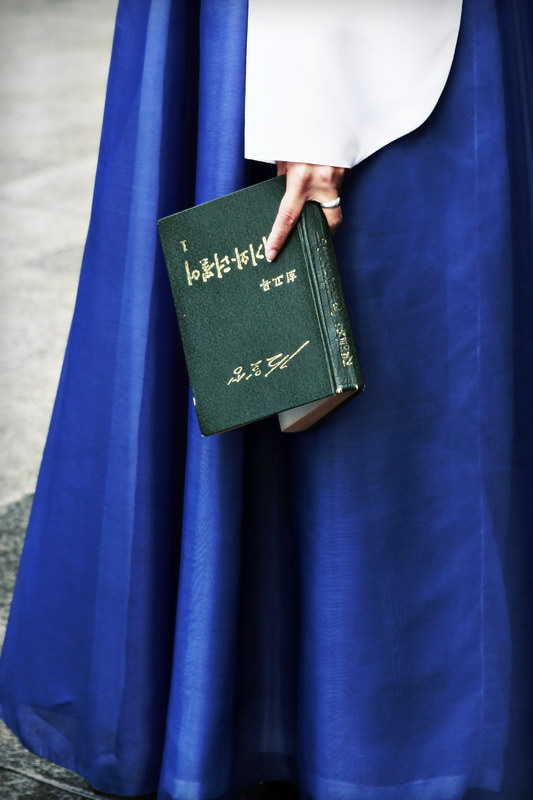
A tour guide holds onto a copy of With the Century. In North Korea, it enjoys genuine popularity.

In North Korea, With the Century holds an important role in culture and society and is genuinely popular. There it is a major source of the myth of the "anti-Japanese" struggle in propaganda. Western scholars, on the other hand, have focused on the historicity of events portrayed in the memoirs and have critically assessed the value of With the Century as a historical source. The omnipresence of With the Century has also been linked to Kim's cult of personality.

=== Popularity in North Korea ===
Despite its political nature and conformity with the official political line of the state, With the Century enjoys genuine popularity in North Korea. It is considered Kim Il Sung's most popular work, and when the first volume was released, it supposedly became an instant hit. As a child, defector Jae-young Kim remembers reading "every page with fascination, despite the highly ideological subject matter" and being particularly intrigued with stories about Kim Il Sung's first wife, Kim Jong-suk. Defector and former propagandist, Jang Jin-sung recalls in his book Dear Leader: My Escape from North Korea how when he wants to impress a fellow escapee, he brags that his friend's "grandparents are mentioned in our textbooks as leading anti-Japanese resistance fighters, as well as in Kim Il Sung's own memoir, With the Century." According to Hwang Jang-yop, a high-ranking North Korean defector, the book's contents were as if they were straight out of revolutionary movies making it a very pleasant read.

The work typifies the attitude of North Korean propaganda toward military affairs. Military decisions are not based on strategy and reason but emotional conviction to a cause.

=== Ban in South Korea ===
The book is banned in South Korea for the general public similarly to other printed material originating from North Korea. In August 2011, the South Korean Supreme Court regarded With the Century as “anti-state expression” under the National Security Law.

In April 2021, the memoirs were published by a publisher in South Korea, causing great controversy. On 23 April 2021, Kyobo Book Center, South Korea's biggest bookstore chain, decided to cease sales of the memoirs, in order to "protect customers". Several conservative organizations, such as New Paradigm of Korea, sought an injunction to ban the sales of With the Century, because "distribution of the memoirs 'glamorizing the Kim family' infringes on human rights and harms the dignity of South Koreans as well as the country's democracy." The injunction was rejected by the Seoul Western District Court on 16 May 2021. The court said that the memoirs did not directly involve the plaintiffs, so their rights have not been violated by the book's content. On 26 May 2021, South Korea police raided the office of the publisher Minjok Sarangbang, confiscated materials as evidence, as the publication of the memoirs allegedly violated the National Security Act.

=== Western commentary on historicity and authorship ===
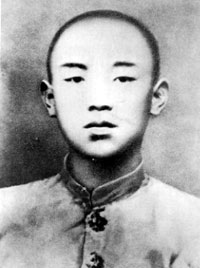
Kim Il-sung in his youth in 1926. With the Century gives a credible but unverifiable account of his early years. Illustration from the book.

With the Century is one of the few North Korean primary sources widely available in the West, and is therefore considered an important source for scholars of North Korean studies. However, the accuracy of the portrayal of historical events in the book has been questioned by scholars. According to Fyodor Tertitskiy, With the Century compromises accuracy and molds events to support the view point of North Korean ideology. For instance, the autobiography recounts the official version of the birth of Kim's son, Kim Jong Il, on Mount Paektu, widely discredited in the West. Hwang Jang-yop calls With the Century a "masterpiece of historical fabrication". Others like Bradley K. Martin note that With the Century is more truthful about Kim's life than official sources published before the 1990s. While it is impossible to verify his writings on his early childhood, Kim's account of events in his youth during the resistance are often more believable than his contemporaries'. For instance, Kim's association with the Church in his childhood is not denied, and neither is the fact that he joined the foreign CCP in 1931.

According to Hwang Jang-yop, With the Century was not written by Kim Il Sung himself but was composed by professional writers and journalists. These writers were supposedly revolutionary film authors, tasked with giving the work movie-like scenes. According to Jang Jin-sung, the authors were novelists of the April 15 Literary Production Group, a "First class" institution reserved to serve the Kim family (Jang also claimed that in 1993, Kim allegedly told a group of Chongryon members how much he enjoyed reading With the Century), while Hwang attributes the writing to the staff of the Party History Center. The production of the memoirs may have been supervised by Kim Jong Il. Hwang, who held a top position in the party at that time, was opposed to publishing the posthumous volumes as he thought that the ones published so far were "too intriguing to be true". Hwang also opposed rewriting post-liberation history because later events would be easier to verify, and historical revisionism could anger North Korea's diplomatic allies.

== See also ==
- Korean nationalist historiography
- Kim Il Sung bibliography
- Kim Jong Il bibliography
- Paek Son-haeng
