= European Girls' Mathematical Olympiad =

Annual math tournament since 2012

The European Girls' Mathematical Olympiad (EGMO) is a mathematical olympiad for girls which started in 2012, and is held in April each year. It was inspired by the China Girls Mathematical Olympiad (CGMO). Although the competition is held in Europe, it is open to female participants from all over the world, and is considered the most prestigious mathematics competition for girls. In recent years, participants from around 55 countries have been invited to the competition.

== Process and scoring ==
The competition is similar in style to the International Mathematical Olympiad (IMO), with two papers, each consisting of three problems to be solved in 4.5 hours, taken on consecutive days. Participating countries send teams consisting of four female mathematicians below the age of 20 who are not yet enrolled at a university. Each of the six problems are marked out of 7, making the maximum possible score 42 points.

The first edition was held in Cambridge, UK. Since then, 13 other countries in Europe have organized the EGMO. The number of participating countries has grown from 19 in the first edition to 57 in the eleventh edition, and the number of contestants from 70 in the first edition to 222 in the eleventh edition. The competitors participate as a team of 4 under the national flag but the contest itself is individual. The selection process varies between countries, but it often involves national Mathematical Olympiads and other Team Selection Tests (TSTs), which become progressively more selective.

Medals are awarded according to this criterion:

- The top 1/12 of the competitors receive a gold medal.
- The following 1/6 of the general classification receive a silver medal.
- The subsequent 1/4 of the general classification receive a bronze medal.
- All those who have not received a medal but have scored the maximum points in at least one of the six problems receive an honorable mention.

== Summary ==
| | Venue | Year | Date | European country with most points | Overall most points | Teams | Refs |
|---|---|---|---|---|---|---|---|
| 1 | (United Kingdom) Cambridge | 2012 | April 10–16 | Poland | Poland | 19 | |
| 2 | Luxembourg | 2013 | April 8–14 | Belarus; Serbia | Belarus; Serbia; United States | 22 | |
| 3 | (Turkey) Antalya | 2014 | April 10–16 | Ukraine | Ukraine | 29 | |
| 4 | (Belarus) Minsk | 2015 | April 14–20 | Ukraine | Ukraine | 30 | |
| 5 | (Romania) Busteni | 2016 | April 10–16 | Russia | Russia | 39 | |
| 6 | (Switzerland) Zurich | 2017 | April 6–12 | Ukraine | United States | 44 | |
| 7 | (Italy) Florence | 2018 | April 9–15 | Russia | Russia | 52 | |
| 8 | (Ukraine) Kyiv | 2019 | April 7–13 | Ukraine | United States | 50 | |
| 9 | (Netherlands) Egmond aan Zee (online) | 2020 | April 15–21 | Russia | Russia | 53 | |
| 10 | (Georgia (country)) Kutaisi (online) | 2021 | April 9–15 | Russia | Russia | 55 | |
| 11 | (Hungary) Eger (hybrid) | 2022 | April 6–12 | Romania | United States | 57 | |
| 12 | (Slovenia) Portorož | 2023 | April 13–19 | Ukraine | China | 55 | |
| 13 | (Georgia (country)) Tsqaltubo | 2024 | April 11–17 | Ukraine | United States | 54 | |
| 14 | (Kosovo) Pristina | 2025 | April 11–17 | Italy | China | 56 | |
| 15 | (France) Bordeaux | 2026 | April 9–15 | Romania | China | 67 | |
| 16 | (Croatia) Šibenik | 2027 | April 11–17 | | | | |
| 17 | (Lithuania) Vilnius | 2028 | | | | | |

== Medal table ==
The 66 countries that have won a medal are as follows:

| Rank | Country | Gold | Silver | Bronze | Honorable Mentions |
|---|---|---|---|---|---|
| 1 | United States | 39 | 12 | 5 | 0 |
| 2 | Romania | 19 | 25 | 11 | 0 |
| 3 | Ukraine | 19 | 23 | 10 | 1 |
| 4 | Russia | 16 | 4 | 0 | 0 |
| 5 | Australia | 16 | 6 | 5 | 3 |
| 6 | Hungary | 13 | 16 | 25 | 0 |
| 7 | Serbia | 12 | 10 | 20 | 7 |
| 8 | Poland | 10 | 24 | 17 | 2 |
| 9 | China | 10 | 2 | 0 | 0 |
| 10 | Turkey | 9 | 20 | 17 | 7 |
| 11 | France | 9 | 19 | 19 | 4 |
| 12 | United Kingdom | 9 | 19 | 19 | 4 |
| 13 | Peru | 9 | 8 | 2 | 3 |
| 14 | Belarus | 7 | 11 | 22 | 4 |
| 15 | Israel | 7 | 9 | 7 | 5 |
| 16 | Bulgaria | 6 | 24 | 19 | 4 |
| 17 | Japan | 6 | 9 | 22 | 3 |
| 18 | Mexico | 5 | 14 | 20 | 5 |
| 19 | Italy | 5 | 13 | 25 | 7 |
| 20 | Germany | 5 | 10 | 10 | 3 |
| 21 | Bosnia and Herzegovina | 3 | 13 | 16 | 6 |
| 22 | Kazakhstan | 3 | 12 | 15 | 4 |
| 23 | Georgia | 3 | 9 | 8 | 9 |
| 24 | Slovakia | 3 | 6 | 11 | 4 |
| 25 | Croatia | 2 | 8 | 5 | 5 |
| 26 | Saudi Arabia | 2 | 7 | 15 | 12 |
| 27 | Czech Republic | 2 | 6 | 15 | 10 |
| 28 | Chinese Taipei | 2 | 3 | 2 | 0 |
| 29 | Azerbaijan | 2 | 0 | 9 | 10 |
| 30 | Canada | 1 | 13 | 11 | 4 |
| 31 | Netherlands | 1 | 6 | 24 | 9 |
| 32 | Brazil | 1 | 7 | 20 | 3 |
| 33 | Moldova | 1 | 3 | 17 | 9 |
| 34 | Lithuania | 1 | 3 | 9 | 8 |
| 35 | North Macedonia | 1 | 2 | 10 | 14 |
| 36 | Finland | 1 | 1 | 5 | 9 |
| 37 | Switzerland | 1 | 6 | 17 | 12 |
| 38 | India | 0 | 8 | 17 | 4 |
| 39 | Slovenia | 0 | 5 | 11 | 13 |
| 40 | Ireland | 0 | 3 | 6 | 15 |
| 41 | Belgium | 0 | 4 | 3 | 14 |
| 42 | Spain | 0 | 4 | 2 | 10 |
| 43 | Mongolia | 0 | 2 | 13 | 4 |
| 44 | Bangladesh | 0 | 2 | 7 | 7 |
| 45 | Latvia | 0 | 1 | 8 | 12 |
| 46 | Norway | 0 | 1 | 6 | 8 |
| 47 | Indonesia | 0 | 1 | 4 | 0 |
| 48 | Uzbekistan | 0 | 1 | 2 | 0 |
| 49 | Chile | 0 | 1 | 1 | 2 |
| 50 | Costa Rica | 0 | 1 | 1 | 2 |
| 51 | Kosovo | 0 | 1 | 1 | 4 |
| 52 | Denmark | 0 | 0 | 4 | 5 |
| 53 | Ecuador | 0 | 0 | 4 | 5 |
| 54 | Austria | 0 | 0 | 4 | 2 |
| 55 | Armenia | 0 | 0 | 4 | 0 |
| 56 | Greece | 0 | 0 | 3 | 9 |
| 57 | Cyprus | 0 | 0 | 3 | 7 |
| 58 | Luxembourg | 0 | 0 | 3 | 8 |
| 59 | Iran | 0 | 0 | 3 | 0 |
| 60 | Tunisia | 0 | 0 | 2 | 6 |
| 61 | Tajikistan | 0 | 0 | 2 | 5 |
| 62 | South Africa | 0 | 0 | 2 | 1 |
| 63 | Albania | 0 | 0 | 1 | 12 |
| 64 | Kyrgyzstan | 0 | 0 | 1 | 3 |
| 65 | New Zealand | 0 | 0 | 1 | 2 |
| 66 | Syria | 0 | 0 | 1 | 1 |

The individuals with the most medals and appearances at the EGMO can be found on the "EGMO: Hall of Fame" section of the website. There have been 28 perfect scores (USA - 8, Russia, China - 4 each, Ukraine - 3, Serbia, Turkey - 2 each, UK, Australia, Azerbaijan, Bulgaria, Israel - 1 each) in the first 13 editions of the competition.

At the 15th edition held in Bordeaux, France in April 2026, Shreya Shantanu Mundhada became the first Indian to win a gold medal at EGMO, as India secured its best-ever team ranking of 6th place among 67 participating countries, winning one gold, one silver, and one bronze medal

== Impact ==
Several international Olympiad competitions aimed at girls were launched, inspired by the success of the EGMO. These include:

- The European Girls' Olympiad in Informatics (EGOI), an international programming competition, the first edition of which was held in 2021 in Zürich, Switzerland.
- The Pan-American Girls' Mathematical Olympiad (PAGMO), the first edition organized virtually by a group of South American countries.
