= People's Prize =

North Korean arts and sciences award

- Awarded for: Best achievements in creative fields
- Date: September 8, 1958–present
- Country: North Korea
- Presented by: People's Prize Awarding Commission

The People's Prize (Korean: 인민상) is a North Korean arts and sciences award. It is awarded by the People's Prize Awarding Commission, which is working directly under the Cabinet of North Korea. The prize can be granted to works of art or people. People's Prize has been an important award in the field of North Korean cinema.

The works and people that have received the People's Prize cover such varied fields as literature, gymnastics, Korean revolutionary opera, acupuncture and sculpture. The People's Prize has been received by people abroad.

== History ==
The People's Prize was instituted on 8 September 1958.

The first North Korean feature film My Hometown (1949) was directed by Kang Hongshik. It was the first of a film series to be awarded People's Prize. Kim Il Sung praised many of People's Prize winning movies from 1960s and 1970s of supplying an exhaustive answer to the issue of people's Chajusŏng. The Workers' Party gives the award to those North Korean films and film-makers seen as fulfilling the role of an "excellent textbook" for the workers party.

Some of the works, which did not become recognized as "Immortal classics", did earn People's Prize meant only for the best productions. One such production is a three-part film Five Guerilla Brothers (1968) directed by Choe Ik-gyu, and overseen by Kim Jong Il himself. Other films overseen by Kim to win the People's Prize were A Flowering Village and A Family of Workers (1971). In the case of the A Family of Workers, Kim Jong Il was reportedly not satisfied with the application of the seed theory. However, some of Kim Jong Il's movies, such as Sea of Blood (1968) and Flower girl (1972), became "Immortal classics".

In 1965 the Chongryon established Chosun University's teaching staff in Japan received the prize.

Many of the works to obtain People's Prize are still highly regarded in North Korea. Reminiscences of the Anti-Japanese Guerillas is regarded as classic of literature of the Workers' Party, and was awarded People's Prize in 2012. It is still used in daily ideological study sessions at workplaces, and many of the memoirs have later been made into movies.

People's Prize winner Kim Song-gun's major work Waves of the Sea Kumgang was used as a background for a group photo with Kim Jong Il and Bill Clinton during Clinton's visit to North Korea in 2009. Kim Song-gun received the award for his painting Waves of the Sea Kumgang in 1999.

== List of works and people having received the prize ==
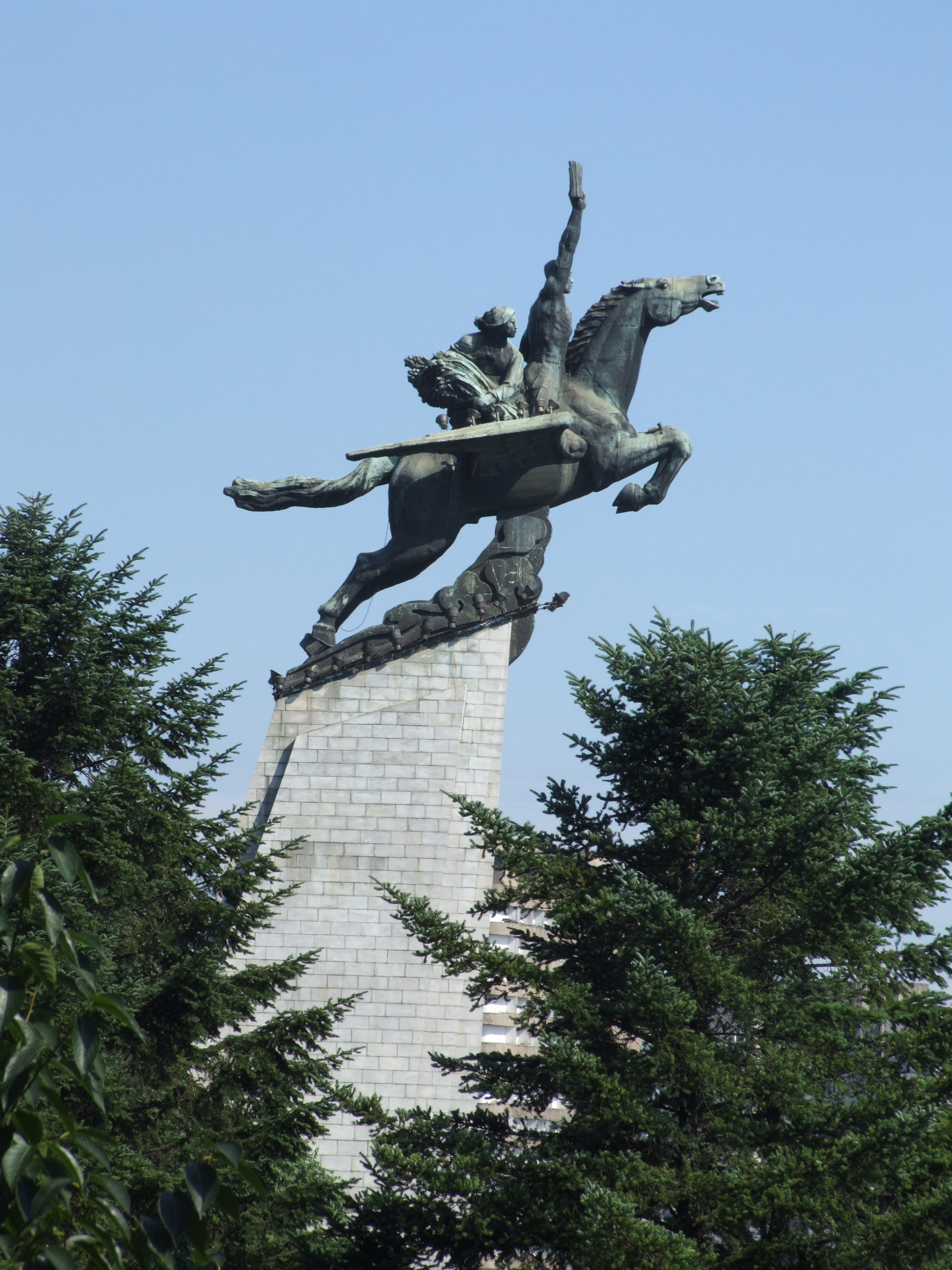
The Chollima statue, unveiled on 15 April 1961, has received the People's Prize.

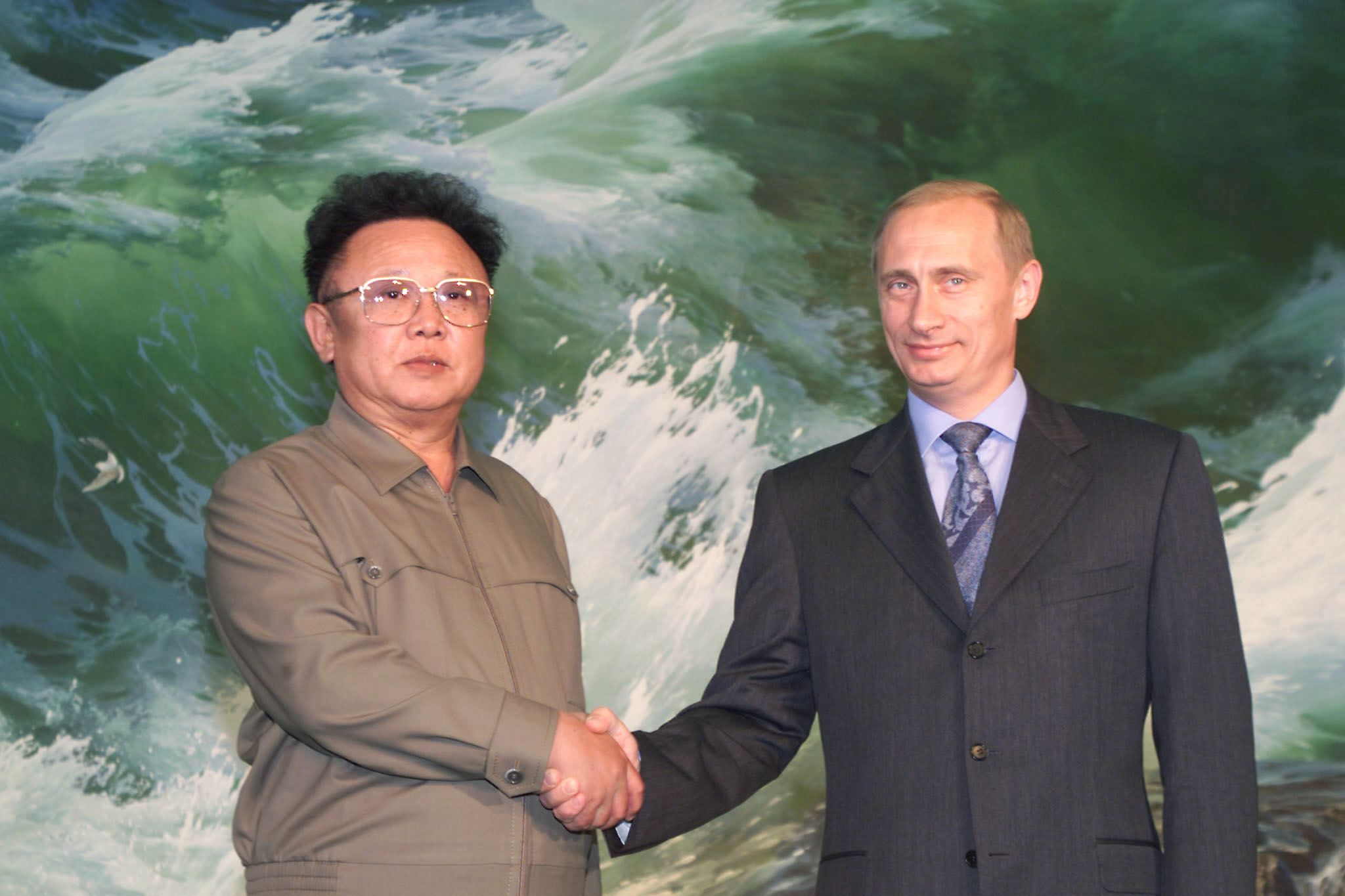
Kim Jong-il shaking hands with Vladimir Putin in front of Kim Song-gun's Waves of the Sea Kumgang, a People's Prize winner.

=== Arts ===
- A granite sculpture Trumpeter of Advance (진격의 나팔수) (awarded in September 1988)
- The Chollima Statue
- Waves of the Sea Kumgang painted by Kim Song-gun (awarded in 1999)
- O Hye-yong is a film scriptwriter known for adapting true stories into films.
- The song The Love for the Motherland is Warm (조국의 사랑은 따사로워라), of which the lyrics were written by Han Dok Su (awarded May 3, 2025).

=== Books ===
- History (력사) by Han Sorya (1958)
- Reminiscences of the Anti-Japanese Guerillas (awarded in March 2012)
- Among the People (awarded in April 1992)

=== Education ===
- Chosun University teaching staff received the prize on 8 January 1965.

=== Gymnastics ===
- Ever-victorious Workers' Party of Korea (백전백승의 조선로동당) (awarded in 2011)
- Korea of Chollima
- Single-minded Unity (awarded in 2011)
- Song of Korea
- The People Sing of Their Leader (awarded in 2011)
- Under the Banner of the Party (awarded in 1980)
- We Will Defend Red Flag Under Leadership of Marshal (awarded in 1996)

=== Movies ===
- Girls at a Port ((포구의 처녀들)
- A Red Agitator (붉은 선동원) (awarded in 1962)
- Daughter of the Sun (태양의 딸) (awarded in 1962)
- Demarcation village (분계선마을에서) (awarded in 1962)
- The Flourishing Village
- Five Guerilla Brothers
- When Apples Are Picked (사과 딸 때)
- The Brigade Commander's Former Superior (여단장의 옛 상관)
- My Hometown
- Sea of Blood
- Sunflower (awarded in 1962)
- Fate of a Self-defence Corps Man (한 자위단원의 운명)
- The Spinner
- A Worker's Family ((로동가정)
- The Flower Girl
- An Jung Gun Shoots Ito Hirobumi
- Guarantee (보증)

=== Musical plays ===
- Under a Bright Sun (밝은 태양아래에서) (awarded on 30 December 1962)

=== Revolutionary opera ===
- The Story of a Nurse (한 간호원에 대한 이야기)

=== Science ===
- Kim Bong-han received the prize on 2 February 1962 for his work on acupuncture.
- Kye Ung-sang known for his research on eri and tussar silkworms received the prize in 1963.

== See also ==
- List of awards for contributions to culture
- Kim Il Sung Prize
- Lenin Prize
- Orders and medals of North Korea
- People's Artist
