= Reminiscences of the Anti-Japanese Guerillas =

1959 collection of memoirs of North Korean guerrillas

- Cover page of the English edition (1968)
- Language: Korean
- Subject: Korean resistance movements, 1905-1945 - Personal narratives; Guerrillas - China - Manchuria
- Genre: Memoirs
- Published: May 1959 (Korean ed.); 1968 (English ed.)
- Publisher: Pyongyang: Workers' Party of Korea Publishing House (Korean ed.); Pyongyang: Foreign Languages Publishing House (English ed.)
- Publication place: North Korea
- Media type: Print in multiple volumes
- Pages: 227 p.; vol. 1 (Korean ed.); 153 p. (English ed.)
- Awards: People's Prize (2012)
- OCLC: 1097890
- Dewey Decimal: 951.9/03
- LC Class: DS917 .R397

- Reminiscences of the Anti-Japanese Guerillas
- Chosŏn'gŭl: 항일 빨찌산 참가자들의 회상기
- Hancha: 抗日 빨찌산 參加者들의 回想記
- Revised Romanization: Hangil ppaljjisan chamgajadeurui hoesanggi
- McCune–Reischauer: Hangil ppaltchisan ch'amgajadŭrŭi hoesanggi

Reminiscences of the Anti-Japanese Guerillas (Korean: 항일 빨찌산 참가자들의 회상기; Hanja: 抗日 빨찌산 參加者들의 回想記; RR: Hangil ppaljjisan chamgajadeurui hoesanggi; MR: Hangil ppaltchisan ch'amgajadŭrŭi hoesanggi) is a collection of memoirs of North Korean guerillas fighting during the 1930s and 1940s in Manchuria against the Japanese. It was used as a textbook for indoctrination until it was effectively replaced by another piece of guerilla literature, Kim Il Sung's autobiography With the Century, in the 1990s. The memoirs were written in order to portray Kim Il Sung as a national liberator, and to strengthen his cult of personality. However, the memoirs are still used as a textbook in ideological workplace study sessions, as well as in other forms of indoctrination. Many of the memoirs have been adapted as movies by the North Korean film industry.

== Role of the memoirs and state propaganda ==
The Party History Institute (당력사연구소) was founded in 1958, and its collection of memoirs, Reminiscences of the Anti-Japanese Guerillas, was published in 1959, when Kim Il-sung's cult of personality was being strengthened after the August Faction Incident. These initiatives were part of the efforts to create and promote Kim Il Sung's activities during World War II as an anti-Japanese myth. High-ranking defector Hwang Jang-yop dated the beginning of the personality cult at the end of the 1960s, when various guerillas disappeared from North Korean partisan literature. Until the 1960s, guerillas like Ŭlchi Mundŏk, Kang Gam-chan and Lee Sun-shin were common in North Korean partisan literature. Others like Ahn Chang-ho and Shin Chae-ho were discredited.

In the late 1960s, Kim Jong Il called back all the unofficial guerilla memoirs, and publishing them independently through news media or publishing houses was banned. After the Kapsan faction incident in 1967, similar to the August Faction Incident in nature, Kim Jong Il ordered the chapters in Reminiscences of the Anti-Japanese Guerillas written by the conspirators to be deleted. Since then, the Party History Institute would review and edit all memoirs. Hwang accused Kim Jong Il of trying to monopolize the independence struggle for the Kim family. Jae-Cheon Lim argues that in the 1990s, the role of the memoirs as a tool for indoctrination was largely replaced by With the Century.

The memoirs are still commonly used in daily ideological study sessions at workplaces, as they are seen as classic literature of the Workers' Party of Korea. They are also used as ideological study material in universities and in the Korean People's Army. The memoirs are also used in annual mandatory party members' political examinations handled by the party Propaganda and Agitation Department. Repeated failures in the examinations have resulted in local officials being fired.

== Release details ==
In May 1959, the first volume of the memoirs was published for the first time by the Workers' Party of Korea Publishing House. Since then, they have been republished in numerous volumes and editions.

In November 2003, it was announced that the Workers' Party of Korea Publishing House planned to publish 20 volumes of reminiscences by combining earlier published series Reminiscences of the Anti-Japanese Guerillas, Combat Reminiscences of Anti-Japanese Guerillas and For the Freedom and Liberation of the People. The first volume carried 27 chapters of memoirs.

In 2012, the memoirs won the People's Prize in North Korea. Many of the memoirs have since the 1959 release been made into movies, including Comrades! Please Take This Pistol, Fighter on Mt. Chonbo and Story of An Sun Hwa.

The memoirs have been reprinted by the University Press of the Pacific in English. Translations exist in Finnish and Swahili.

== Select contributors ==
The following guerillas who entered politics after the war have contributed to the series.

- Person has contributed to this volume.
- Person has not contributed to this volume.

Name	1	2	3	4	5	6	7	8	9	10	11	12
An Chong-suk												
An Yong(안영)												
Chang Sang-yong												
Chi Kyong-su												
Chi Pyong-hak(지병학)												
Cho Myong-son조명선												
Cho Tong-uk												
Choe Hyon(최현)												
Choe In-dok(최인덕)												
Choe Ki-chol												
Choe Kwang(최광)												
Choe Min-chol(최민철)												
Chon Chang-chol												
Chon Mun-sop(전문섭)												
Chon Mun-uk												
Chong Pyong-gap												
Chu To-il												
Han Ik-su												
Ho Chang-suk												
Ho Pong-hak												
Hwang Sun-hui(황순희)												
Kim Cha-rin(김자린)												
Kim Chang-bong												
Kim Chol-man												
Kim Chwa-hyok(김좌혁)												
Kim Ik-hyon												
Kim Kyong-sok												
Kim Myung-jun(김명중)												
Kim Myong-suk(김명숙)												
Kim Ok-sun												
Kim Pyong-sik												
Kim Song-guk												
Kim Tae-hong												
Kim Tong-gyu(김동규)												
Kim Yang-chun												
Kim Yo-jung												
Kim Yong-yon												
O Chae-won												
O Chin-u												
O Peak-yong(오백룡)												
Paek Hak-nim(백학림)												
Pak Kwang-son(박광선)												
Pak Kyong-suk												
Pak Song-chol												
Pak U-sop												
Pak Yong-sun(박영순)												
So Chol(서철)												
Sok San(석산)												
Son Chong-jun(손종준)												
Tae Pyong-yol												
Wang Ok-hwan												
Yi Kuk-chin												
Yi Pong-su												
Yi Tu-chan(리두찬)												
Yi Ul-sol(리을설)												
Yi Yong-gu												
Yi Yong-suk												
Yim Chol(임철)												
Yim Chun-chu												
Yu Chang-gwon												
Yun Tae-hong(윤태홍)												

== See also ==
- Anti-Japanese resistance volunteers in China
- History of North Korea
- Korea under Japanese rule
- Korean independence movement
- Korean nationalist historiography
- Northeast Anti-Japanese United Army
