= Jilin City No.1 High School =

- 吉林市第一中学校

Location
- No.1, Songjiang Southroad, Chuanying District; Jilin City, Jilin; China

Information
- Other name: Jilin Yizhong (Chinese: 吉林一中)
- Type: Public high school
- Motto: 敦品励行，热心向学
- Established: 1907
- Principal: Zhang Yanming
- Area: 285,000 m^{2}
- Website: www.jlyz.com.cn

Jilin City No.1 High School (Chinese: 吉林市第一中学, Pinyin: jí lín shì dì yī Zhōng xué), commonly abbreviated as Jilin Yizhong (Chinese: 吉林一中), is a public key high school in Jilin City, Jilin, China.

== History ==
Jilin City No.1 High School was founded in 1907, in the 33rd year of the reign of the Guangxu Emperor. In 1905 the Qing dynasty abolished the traditional imperial examinations, and decided to reform China's education system based a Western model. In 1907 it increased its support for educational reform.

In 1907 several Chinese scholars who had studied overseas, including Sun Shutang, Zhao Mingxin, Nie Shuqing, Ba Yang'a and Wu Yusen, returned to China and wrote a joint letter to the government, proposing the establishment of a modern high school. On March 29, 1907, the Jilin Academy was established, the first government-run general high school in China. In 1912, shortly following the end of the Qing dynasty and the establishment of the Republic of China (1912–49), the school was renamed "Jilin High School", and was expanded to offer four years of schooling.

In 1931, after Japan occupied Manchuria, Chinese Communist Party agents secretly developed a cell on campus, a student-led patriotic group named the "Society for Mutual Aid" (互濟會). While Northeast China was administered by the Japanese puppet-state of Manchukuo (1931-1945), students from Jilin No. 1 High School repeatedly scored among the top students in Manchukuo.

In 1959, a decade after the founding of the People's Republic of China, the school was renamed "Jilin City No.1 High School". After the Cultural Revolution occurred in 1966, the school was shut down by Red Guards. It remained closed until 1973, when it was allowed to reopen, with a limited curriculum and attendance, due to the presence and influence of some staff on a local revolutionary committee. In 1976, following the death of Mao Zedong, the school campus was expanded to 10,000 square meters. In 1978, following the educational and economic reforms of Deng Xiaoping, the school was identified as a model for reforming the education system in Jilin province, and was allowed to resume the educational mandate that it had exercised before the Cultural Revolution. In 2003 the Jilin provincial government recognized Jilin City No.1 High School as a "key school", giving it special funding and developing it as a prestigious school within the province of Jilin.

== Campus ==
Over its history, the school has moved to different campuses six times. Its current campus covers 285,000 square meters, of which 136,000 square meters has been developed. It has 4,557 students in 90 classes—from grade 10 to grade 12—and 417 staff members.

== See also ==
- History of education in China#Republican era
- High School Attached to Northeast Normal University
- Jilin Yuwen High School
