= Shang Yue =

Chinese historian, author, and professor (1902–1982)

- 尚钺
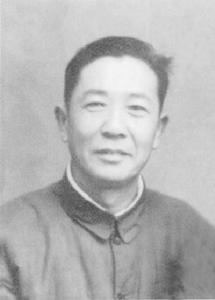
- Born: 1902; Luoshan, Xinyang, Henan province, China
- Died: January 6, 1982 (aged 79–80); Beijing
- Resting place: Babaoshan Revolutionary Cemetery
- Other name: Sang Wol (in Korean)
- Education: Peking University
- Occupation: Professor at Renmin University of China
- Known for: Teacher of Kim Il Sung, idea of the sprouts of capitalism
- Notable work: Essays on the Debate on the Sprouts of Capitalism in China
- Children: Shang Jialan (eldest daughter), a second daughter, Shang Xiaoyuan (a third daughter) and a son

Shang Yue (Chinese: 尚钺; pinyin: Shàng Yuè; Wade–Giles: Shang Yüeh; 1902 – January 6, 1982) was a Chinese Marxist economic historian, author and professor at the School of History at Renmin University of China. Before becoming a historian, he also wrote fiction. He taught literature to Kim Il Sung for a short time at Yuwen Middle School in Manchuria. In China, he is primarily known for his work on the idea of the sprouts of capitalism: that proto-capitalism and class struggle had existed in earlier Chinese history. His purge in 1958 foreshadowed the Chinese Cultural Revolution as his ideas on Chinese economic history conflicted with those of Mao Zedong. After his purge he continued to work on history, but stayed out of the public eye until Mao's death in 1976. His work also had a lasting effect on Korean nationalist historiography.

== Career ==
Shang enrolled in the English faculty of Peking University in 1921 and left the institution in 1926 without graduating. In 1928, Shang worked at private Yuwen Middle School as a teacher of literature and Chinese. There he taught literature and aesthetics to the future North Korean leader Kim Il Sung for six months in 1928. At the time, Shang was a member of the Chinese Communist Party's Manchurian branch. Kim credits Shang with having influenced him in his autobiography, With the Century. Kim reminisces about Shang introducing him to both Chinese classics, such as Dream of the Red Chamber, and contemporary literature of Lu Xun and Chen Duxiu, as well as Russian literature, including Gorky's The Mother and Enemies. Shang reinforced Kim's views on peasant nationalism, possibly reflecting a shift of policy in the Chinese Communist Party following the second Chinese revolution (1925–1927). Shang also encouraged Kim to become a proletarian writer, always stressing the social mission of literature. Shang's influence can be seen in the political dramas Kim would author in the 1930s, such as Sea of Blood. Shang lost contact with Kim after he was arrested by the Nationalist Chinese. Shang's daughter later attested that her father had thought of Kim as "diligent, putting good questions both inside and outside the class."

Until 1939, Shang worked as an editor at a number of radical periodicals. Shang Yue became a professor at Renmin University after 1949. He was one of the historians in Mainland China who contributed to the idea of the sprouts of capitalism, describing features of the economies of the late Ming and early Qing dynasties. His work was published in two volumes named Essays on the Debate on the Sprouts of Capitalism in China. His Outline of Chinese History (1954) became a widely used textbook.

Shang Yue's theory of capitalism in China gained wide support until at least the Anti-rightist campaign of 1957. Shang's theory contradicted Mao Zedong's idea that indigenous capitalism in China did not exist before, but that it could have eventually developed on its own in China. Shang was purged in 1958. However, even in the early 1960s, an officially approved work by historian Jian Bozan reiterated Shang's arguments. Shang's influence finally waned during the Cultural Revolution, during which he suffered. He continued to write about history but remained out of the public eye until Mao's death in 1976.

Shang Yue lived and worked during his career at Jilin, Harbin, Shanghai, Beijing, Hankou, Chongqing, Ningxia and Yan'an. According to Kim Il Sung, he was once the Chief Secretary of the Provincial Party Committee of Manchuria. Before becoming a historian, he also wrote fiction. He was once famous for his collection of short stories Giant Pirates. It takes place in Xinyang, Shang's hometown.

== Sprouts of capitalism ==
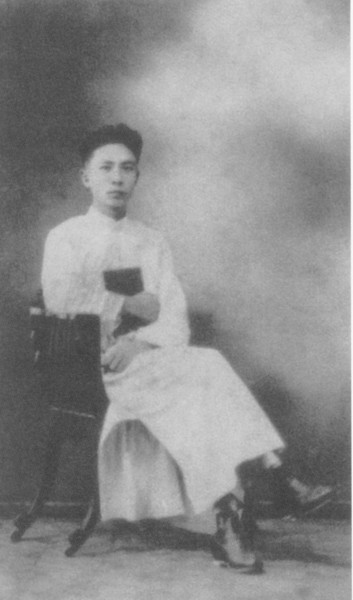
Shang Yue

The core argument of Shang Yue's idea on the sprouts of capitalism is that proto-capitalism existed under late Ming and early Qing China from the 16th to the 17th century, as evidenced by large quantities of factory products that entered metropolitan markets. He thought that a large number of factories implied the existence of proletarian and bourgeois classes, and of a commodity economy. For him, the existence of a bourgeois class was a prerequisite for the formation of the Chinese nation. He argued that the delayed development of Chinese capitalism was caused by both the Mongol and Manchu conquests of China.

Shang Yue's work was part of the efforts by Chinese historians to make the formation of Communist China seem like a natural outcome. He saw the Donglin movement as a proletarian struggle in late Ming China, and, unlike Soviet sinologists, promoted the idea that the Chinese nation had a much more developed history of class struggle than European nations of that time. He gave China a more equal, or even more advanced, historical status compared with European society of the period.

However, Mao Zedong argued that China would have developed into a capitalist society even without foreign imperialist influence. Mao claimed that bourgeois and proletarian classes did not exist before the imperialist powers started to affect China after the Opium War. Mao thought that for China, imperialism was an even worse threat than the bourgeois class. Liu Danian complained that Shang Yue's theory glorified opium trade as a progressive force, and degraded the Qing government and its subjects for active resistance. Shang was forced to admit in early 1958 that he had produced revisionist historiography, and was purged later that year. Jungmin Seo argues that reactions to Shang's theory show Chinese historians' fear that greater emphasis on internal proto-capitalism might divert too much attention from foreign capitalism's influence that transformed China into a semi-colonial or semi-feudal status.

Reform and opening up after Mao's death initially renewed the theory of sprouts of capitalism. However, the sprouts of capitalism is currently regarded in Chinese historiography as not having been a distinctive phase of economic development. Both North and South Korean nationalist historians adopted and advanced the theory of sprouts (MR: maenga) of capitalism to downplay Japanese influence on the origins of Korean industrialization. They claimed that industrial development had been halted by the annexation of Korea in 1910. Since the 1980s, the South Korean historians have been largely denying the validity of the theory.

== Bibliography ==
- Shang Yue. Giant Pirates.
- — (1955). The Historical Relationship between Marshal Kim Il Sung and I in His Boyhood.
- — (1956). Zhongguo zibenzhuyi guanxi fasheng ji yanbian de chubu yanjiu [A Preliminary Study on the Emergence and Transition of Chinese Capitalism] (in Chinese). Beijing: Sanlian shudian.
- — (1957). Zhōngguó zīběn zhǔyì méngyá wèntí tǎolùn jí 中國資本主义萌芽問題討論集 [Essays on the debate on the sprouts of capitalism in China] (in Chinese). Beijing: Renmin University of China. OCLC 19619860.
- — (1960). Zhōngguó zīběn zhǔyì méngyá wèntí tǎolùn jí: Xù biān 中國資本主义萌芽問題討論集 : 續編 [Essays on the debate on the sprouts of capitalism in China, continued] (in Chinese). Beijing: Renmin University of China. OCLC 866366372.
- — (1954). Zhongguo lishi gangyao [Outline of Chinese History] (in Chinese). Beijing: Renmin Chubanshe.
- — (1984). Shang Yue shixue lunwen xuanji [Selected Historical Essays by Shang Yue] (in Chinese). Beijing: Renmin.

== See also ==
- Asiatic mode of production
- Korean independence movement
- Maoism
- Marxist historiography
- Mode of production
- Yang Changji
- Yi Peiji
