= Paek Son-haeng =

Korean philanthropist (1848–1933)

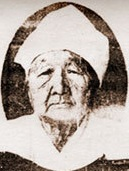
- Born: 1848 November; Chung-kuyŏk, Pyongyang; or Suwon
- Died: 1933
- Known for: Businesswoman and philanthropist

- Paek Son-haeng
- Hangul: 백선행
- Hanja: 白善行
- RR: Baek Seonhaeng
- MR: Paek Sŏnhaeng

Paek Son-haeng (Korean: 백선행; Hanja: 白善行; November 1848 – c. 1933) was a Korean businesswoman known for her philanthropy. The name "Son Haeng" means virtuous deeds, and was a nickname bestowed on her due to her contributions. North Korean sources claim that she was born in modern-day Chung-kuyŏk, Pyongyang, but South Korean sources claim that she was born in Suwon. She was widowed at the age of 16 or 20, and spent the rest of her life saving money while spending very little. Regardless of her place of birth, she spent most of her life in Pyongyang, where most of her donations were made.

Paek has often been used by the North Korean regime as an example of a good capitalist, and contrasted to the majority of capitalists who were miserly and non-patriotic. She is mentioned in Kim Il Sung's With the Century as someone respected by the people as "a great war hero" due to her success in making money under the Japanese regime. In July 2006, her memorial stone was rediscovered and restored in Pyongyang.

Paek made her first major donation after turning 61 in 1908 (see East Asian age reckoning), when she supported the construction of the Paeksŏn Bridge across the Taedong River. In 1922, she built a three-story public assembly hall in Pyongyang. She donated land to the Kwangson School, a public school in Pyongyang, in 1923, and to the Changdok School in 1924. Thereafter she also provided land and an endowment to the school run by Samuel Austin Moffet, and also provided large amounts land to the Sunghyon School in Pyongyang. In 1925, she donated her entire fortune to charity groups.

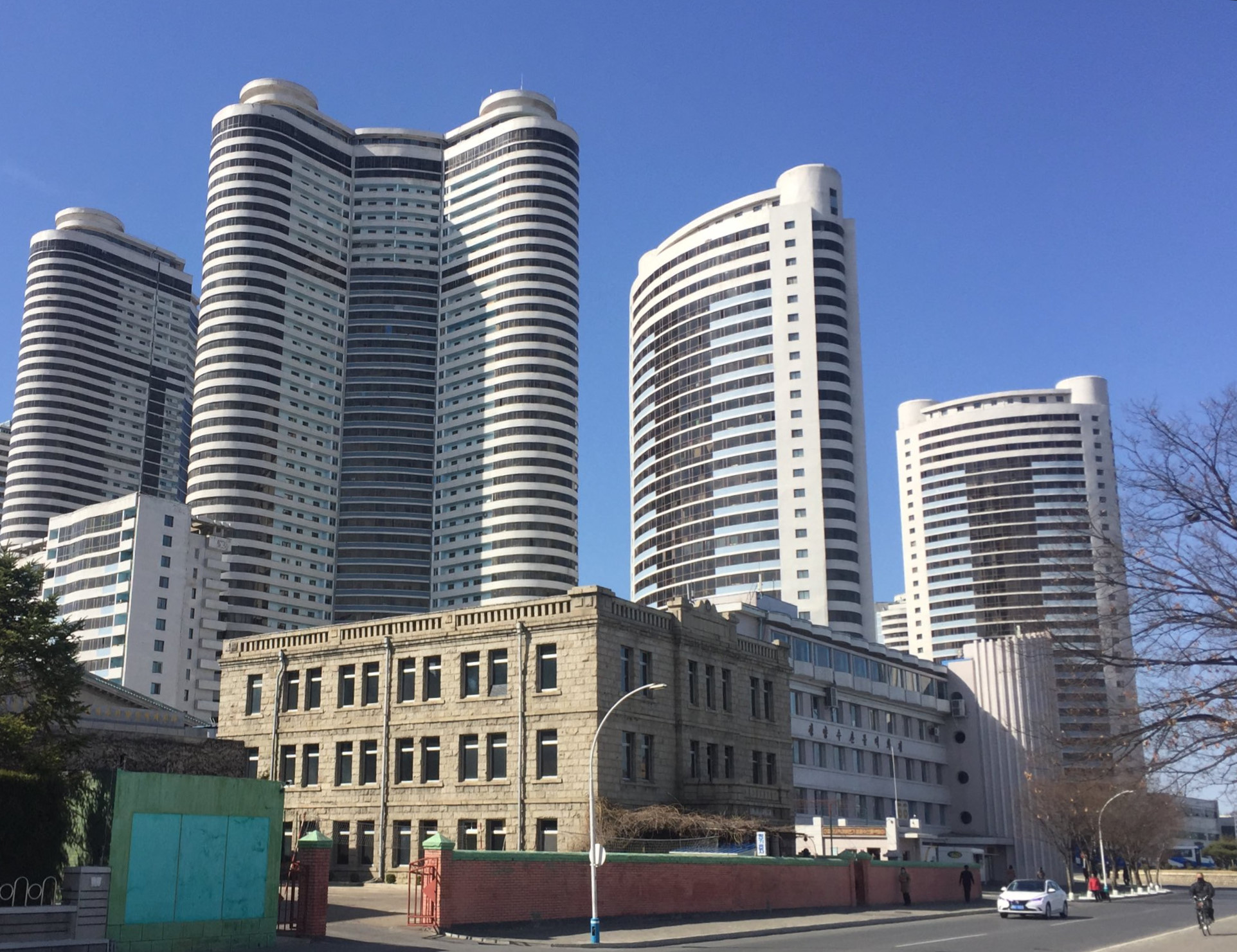
Antique building in the front is Baek Son Haeng Memorial Hall

The Japanese colonial government offered her an award for her contributions, but she refused.
