= Kim Bong-han =

North Korean surgeon (born 1916)

- Born: 1916
- Disappeared: 1966 (aged 49–50)
- Status: Missing
- Education: Seoul National University
- Years active: 1946–1966
- Political party: Korea Democratic Party (former)
- Awards: People's Prize

Korean name
- Hangul: 김봉한
- RR: Gim Bonghan
- MR: Kim Ponghan

Kim Bong-han (Korean: 김봉한; born 1916 – disappeared 1966) was a North Korean medical surgeon at Pyongyang Medical University and Kyung-Rak institute (KRI). He is primarily known for his research on a proposed mechanism for acupuncture that was not accepted by the mainstream medical community, the primo-vascular system. He received the People's Prize for his research. The primo-vascular system was claimed to be scientifically confirmed in 2002, but the matter remains controversial. In 1966, the Kyung-Rak institute was closed and Kim disappeared.

== Early life and education ==
Kim Bong-han was born in 1916. He obtained his medical degree from Seoul National University in 1946. After the Korean War broke out, Kim, who was a physiologist based in South Korea, crossed over to North Korea, leaving his family behind. Prior to his arrival in North Korea, Kim was affiliated with the Korea Democratic Party.

== Primo-vascular system ==
Kim claimed the existence of the Chin-Lo, Kyungrak, or Bonghan system, a system of pathways which he proposed form a basis for acupuncture points and meridians. In 2010, South Korean researchers recognized the same system as the "primo-vascular system". There is credible scientific evidence that these structures exist.

While working as director of North Korea's Kyung-Rak institute (KRI) from 1962 to 1965, Kim published five articles in the Journal of Jo Sun Medicine, about acupuncture, the Kyungrak system, and the "Sanal" theory. These articles form the basis of the proposed primo-vascular system, which attracted some interest as late as in the early 2010s.

The North Korean government supported Kim's research by supplying his team with various analytical instruments such as microscopes and radioactive tracers, most of which were imported from Eastern Europe. He was awarded the People's Prize for his work on 2 February 1962. Kim's book On the Kyungrak system was originally simultaneously published in Korean and Chinese languages in 1963.

== Disappearance ==
In 1966, the Kyung-Rak research institute was shut down. As of 2011, Kim's whereabouts thereafter remain unknown.

== Works ==
- Kim, Bong-han (1962). Great discovery in biology and medicine : substance of Kyungrak. Pyongyang: Foreign Languages Publishing House. OCLC 500017964.
- — (1964). On the Kyungrak system. Pyongyang: Foreign Languages Publishing House. OCLC 299812660.
- — (1965). Kyungrak System and Theory of Sanal. Pyongyang: Medical Science Press. OCLC 1136998725.
- — (2012). "Developmental and Comparative Biological Study of Primo Vascular System". Journal of Acupuncture and Meridian Studies. 5 (5): 248–255. doi:10.1016/j.jams.2012.07.016. ISSN 2005-2901. PMID 23040106.

== See also ==
- List of people who disappeared
- Traditional Korean medicine
