= Sun Yat-sen Memorial Secondary School =

- 中山纪念中学
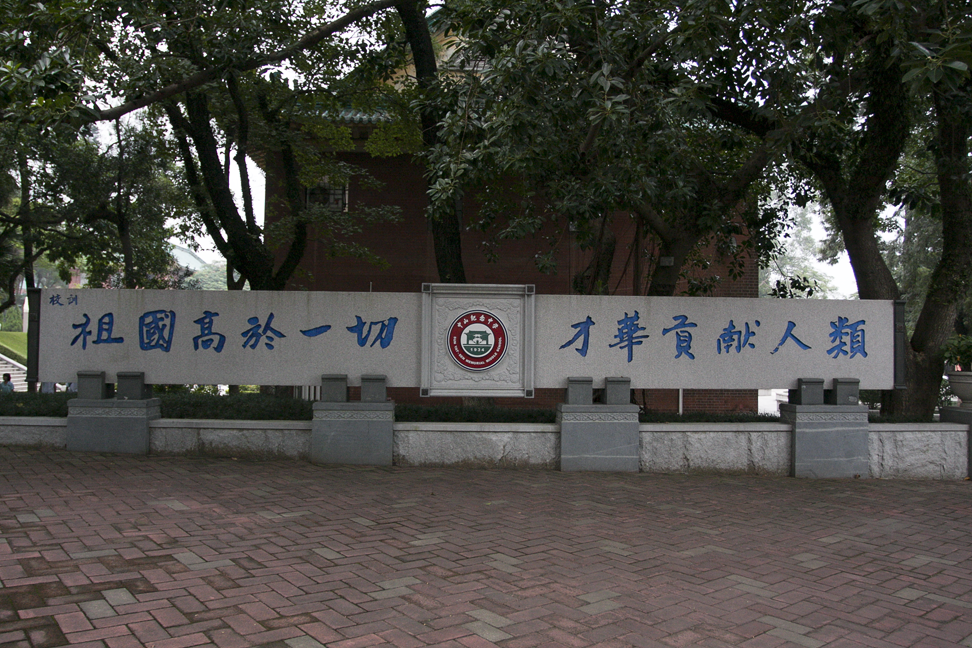
- School motto stone

Information
- Former names: Prime Minister's Hometown Memorial School
- Type: Public, Boarding
- Motto: 祖国高于一切，才华贡献人类 (The motherland is higher than everything; Talents contribute to mankind)
- Established: 1934; 92 years ago
- Founder: Sun Fo
- President: Liang Shifeng
- Chairman: Lin Jialiang
- Faculty: 529 (2022)
- Enrollment: 6300 (2025)
- Campus: Suburb area, 0.565 km^{2} (0.218 sq mi) [850 mǔ]
- Website: 中山市中山纪念中学 (in Chinese)

Chinese name
- Simplified Chinese: 中山纪念中学
- Traditional Chinese: 中山紀念中學
Transcriptions
Standard Mandarin
- Hanyu Pinyin: Zhōngshān Jìniàn Zhōngxúe
Yue: Cantonese
- Jyutping: jung1 san1 kei3 nim6 jung1 hok9

Sun Yat-sen Memorial Secondary School (Chinese: 中山纪念中学; pinyin: Zhōngshān Jìniàn Zhōngxúe) is a public high school established in memory of Sun Yat-sen, the founding father of the Republic of China and the Premier of the Kuomintang in 1934. The school is located in Cuiheng Village, Nanlang, Zhongshan, Guangdong, China, where Sun Yat-sen was born and his family had lived for generations. It is next to the former residence of Sun Yat-sen. The School was founded by Sun Yat-sen's son, Sun Fo, in accordance with his father's wishes. The school was established in 1934 and started to accept students from all over the country. There are 120 home classes in the full boarding school with more than 7000 students.
