= Sprouts of capitalism =

Features of the late Ming and early Qing economies

Chinese name
- Traditional Chinese: 資本主義萌芽
- Simplified Chinese: 资本主义萌芽
Transcriptions
Standard Mandarin
- Hanyu Pinyin: zīběnzhǔyì méngyá

Korean name
- Hangul: 자본주의맹아
Transcriptions
- McCune–Reischauer: chabonjuŭi maenga

Japanese name
- Kanji: 資本主義萌芽
Transcriptions
- Romanization: Shihonshugi hōga

The sprouts of capitalism, seeds of capitalism or capitalist sprouts are features of the economy of the late Ming and early Qing dynasties (16th to 18th centuries) that mainland Chinese historians have seen as resembling developments in pre-industrial Europe, and as precursors of a hypothetical indigenous development of industrial capitalism. Korean nationalist historiography has also adopted the idea. In China the sprouts theory was denounced during the Cultural Revolution, but saw renewed interest after the economy began to grow rapidly in the 1980s.

== Origins of the idea ==
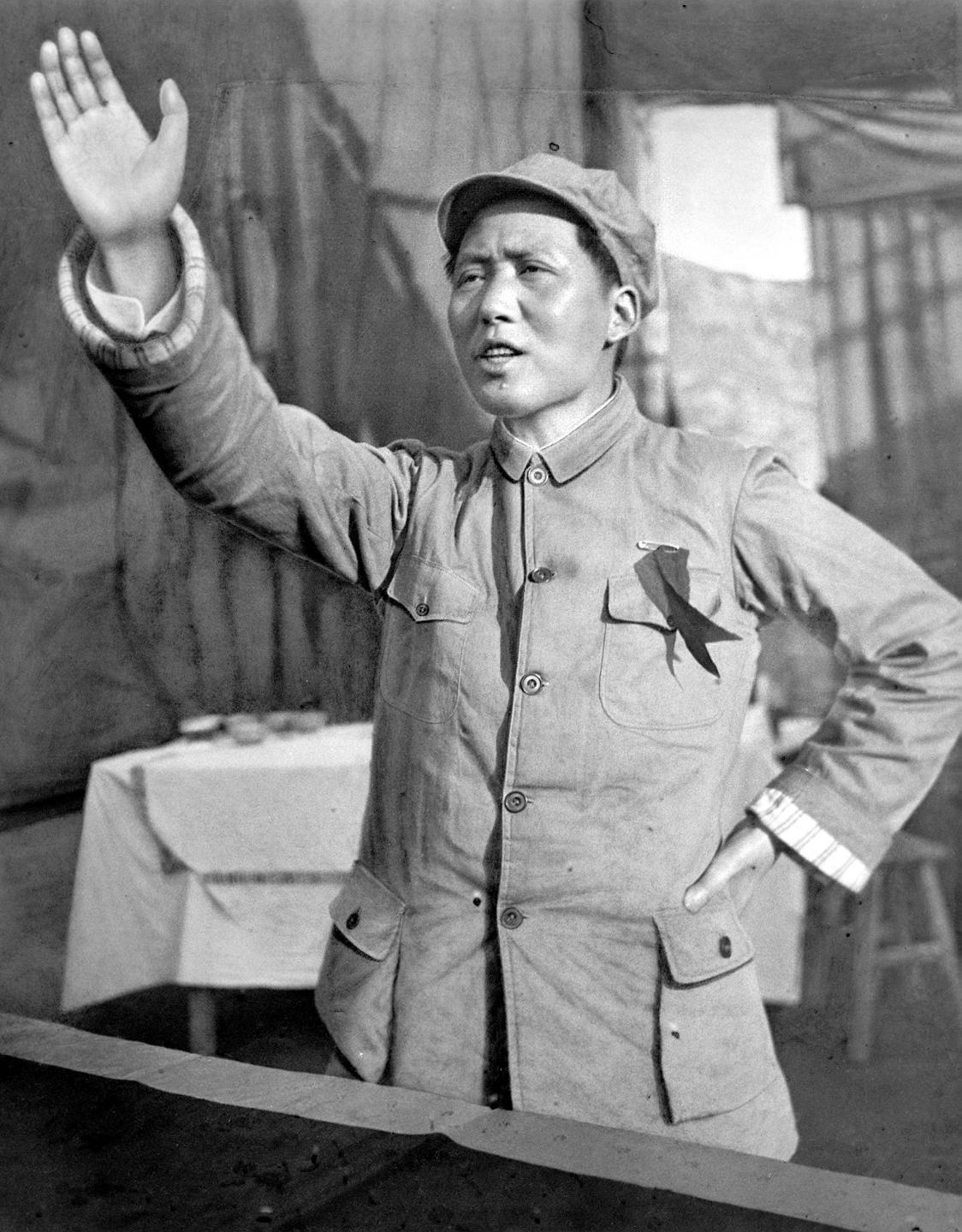
Mao in Yan'an, where he edited The Chinese Revolution and the Chinese Communist Party

The Chinese term was first used in the first chapter, "Chinese Society", of The Chinese Revolution and the Chinese Communist Party, edited by Mao Zedong in 1939:

As China's feudal society had developed a commodity economy, and so carried within itself the seeds of capitalism, China would of herself have developed slowly into a capitalist society even without the impact of foreign capitalism.

— The Chinese Revolution and the Chinese Communist Party

Similar ideas had been explored by Chinese Marxists in the 1920s and 1930s, and provided a way of reconciling Chinese history with Karl Marx's five stages of modes of production: primitive, slavery, feudal, capitalist and socialist.

Shang Yue and other Chinese historians sought to justify Mao's hypothesis in the 1950s, producing a series of papers collected in two volumes entitled Essays on the debate on the sprouts of capitalism in China published in 1957 and 1960. They identified a number of developments in the Chinese economy between the 16th and 18th centuries, including improved farming and handicraft technologies, improvement and expansion of markets, and changes in wage labor relationships. These developments were compared to earlier changes in European economies, and held to constitute a new proto-capitalist phase of Chinese economic history. Some versions of the theory held that indigenous development of industrial capitalism was forestalled by the 17th-century Manchu invasion or 19th-century conflicts with European powers such as the Opium War, while others believed that the sprouts were always weak and had withered by the 19th century.

== Later history of the idea ==
These ideas were also explored by Japanese historians of China in the 1950s, though they concluded that a decisive transformation was unlikely. In 1980 the late-Ming historian Mori Masao said this work "failed to produce satisfactory theoretical results, though it uncovered a wealth of historical facts which had hitherto been unknown". Western economic historians have tended to dismiss the suggestion that these developments presaged a capitalist transformation.

In China, Shang Yue and the "sprouts" theories were denounced in the Anti-rightist Movement and Cultural Revolution for their emphasis on capitalism, and for contradicting Mao's emphasis on Chinese reaction to Western imperialism in the 19th century. The fall of the Gang of Four in 1976 and the resurgence of the Chinese economy in the 1980s led to renewed Chinese interest in these ideas. A notable contribution was the 3-volume A History of the Development of Capitalism in China, by Wu Chengming and colleagues in 1985, with the second volume dealing with the sprouts of capitalism. There have been few publications in the area since the early 1990s. Wu Chengming himself abandoned the idea in the late 1990s. Many Chinese historians now accept that the "sprouts" did not amount to a decisive new phase of economic development.

Economists such as Philip Huang and Li Bozhong have attacked "sprouts" research and other approaches measuring Chinese economic history against developments in Western Europe. They challenge the underlying assumption of a single path of development reflected by the European experience, and argue that focusing on similarities with Europe distorts the study of Chinese history.

== Parallels identified in the sprouts literature ==
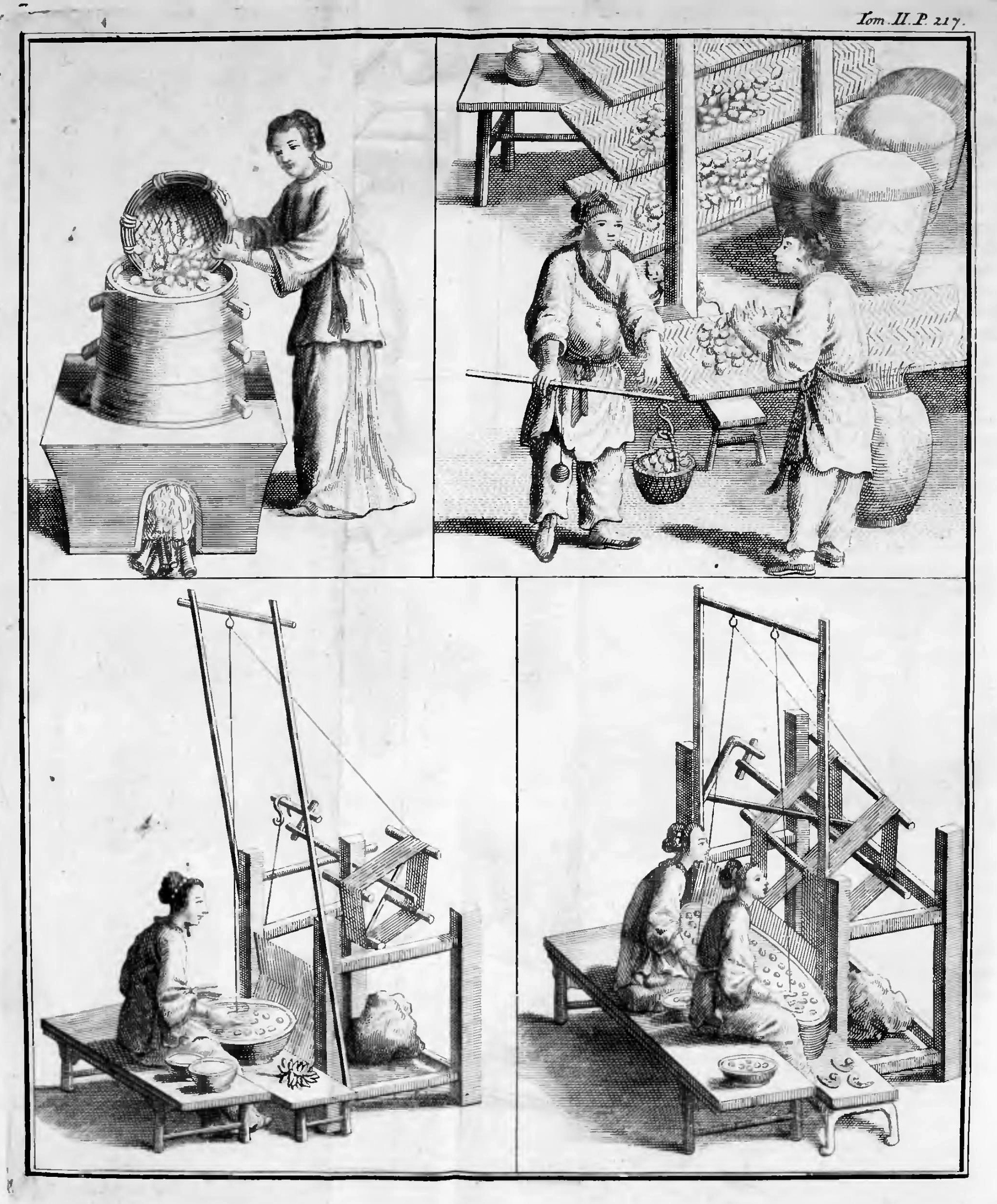
Workers in the porcelain and silk industries (early 18th century)

The sprouts researchers tended to identify the expansion of markets with capitalism. In an influential study in 1957, Fu Yiling placed the origin of the sprouts in a 16th-century "commercial revolution". Chinese exports to the West generated an inflow of silver from the Americas which expanded the money supply, driving the monetization of markets and taxation. The following centuries saw increased regional specialization and the integration of rural markets.

Researchers have pointed to the rise of wage labour in late Ming and early Qing workshops in textile, paper and other industries. However, they lacked the production accounting methods found in European factories, achieving large-scale production by using many small workshops, each with a small team of workers under a master craftsman.

The organization of silk weaving in 18th-century Chinese cities was compared with the putting-out system used in European textile industries between the 13th and 18th centuries. As the interregional silk trade grew, merchant houses began to organize manufacture to guarantee their supplies, providing silk to households for weaving as piece work. In contrast to Europe, where putting-out aimed to harness rural labour to bypass the urban guild system, the Chinese system was a mechanism of spreading risk. In addition, although putting-out began much earlier in continental Europe, it was only in the English cotton industry that it led to industrialization.

== Korean historiography ==
Korean nationalist historians advanced a "sprouts" theory as a counter to the claim that Korean industrialization was the "offspring" of Japanese industrialization. According to this theory, farmers responded to the 17th-century labour shortage caused by foreign invasions by adopting more efficient farming methods, leading to greater commercialization and proto-industrialization, which was curtailed by the Japanese interference from the late 19th century. It became the orthodox theory in school textbooks in both North and South Korea. However, since the 1980s South Korean historians have largely discredited the theory.

== Books ==
- Zhōngguó zīběn zhǔyì méngyá wèntí tǎolùn jí 中國資本主义萌芽問題討論集 [Essays on the debate on the sprouts of capitalism in China], Beijing: People's University of China, 1957.
- Zhōngguó zīběn zhǔyì méngyá wèntí tǎolùn jí: xù biān 中國資本主义萌芽問題討論集 : 續編 [Essays on the debate on the sprouts of capitalism in China, continued], Beijing: People's University of China, 1960.
- Xu, Dixin; Wu, Chengming (1985), Zhōngguó zīběn zhǔyì de méngyá 中国资本主义的萌芽 [Sprouts of Capitalism in China], Zhōngguó zīběn zhǔyì fāzhǎn shǐ 《中国资本主义发展史》 [A History of the Development of Capitalism in China], vol. 2, Beijing: Renmin Chubanshe.
- Xu, Dixin; Wu, Chengming; Curwen, Peter (translator) (2000), Chinese capitalism, 1522–1840, Macmillan, ISBN 978-0-312-21729-7, revised and abridged translation of the three volumes of Xu & Wu (1985).

== See also ==
- Asiatic mode of production
- Economic history of China before 1912
- Great Divergence
- Proto-industrialization
