= Kim Song-gun =

North Korean painter (born 1945)

- Born: 1945 (age 80–81); Chonma County, North Pyongan, Korea
- Education: Pyongyang University of Fine Arts
- Known for: painting, watercolor
- Notable work: Waves of the Sea Kumgang
- Awards: 1999: People's Prize for Waves of the Sea Kumgang

- Kim Song-gun
- Hangul: 김성근
- Hanja: 金成根
- RR: Gim Seonggeun
- MR: Kim Sŏnggŭn

Kim Song-gun (Korean: 김성근; born 1945) is a North Korean painter. He works at the Mansudae Art Studio in Pyongyang.

== Life ==
Kim was born in 1945. He initially worked as a blacksmith for 3 years. After his military service, he started working for the Mansudae in 1971, and studied at Pyongyang University of Fine Arts from 1972 to 1975.

== Work ==
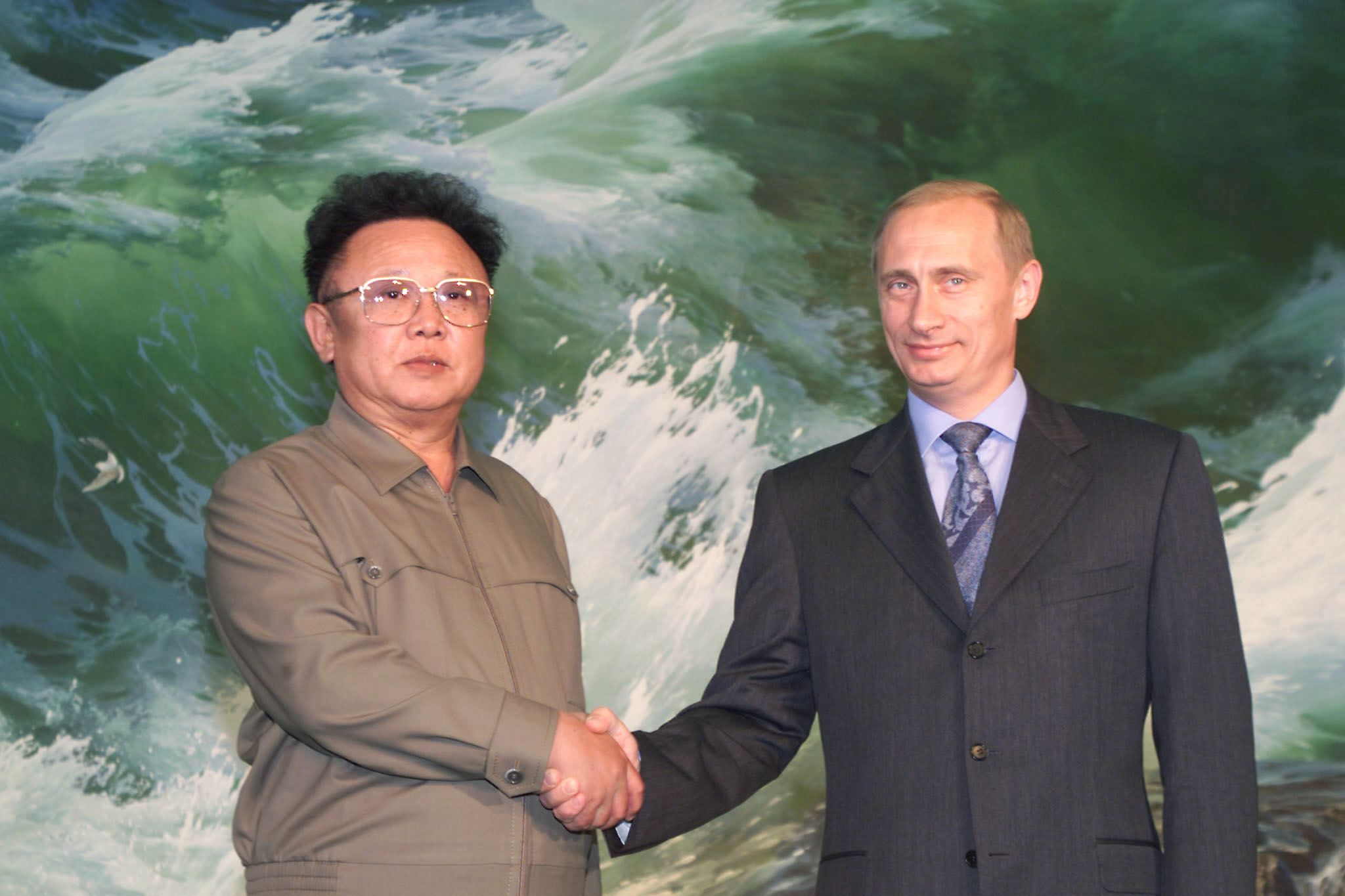
Kim Jong Il and Vladimir Putin shakes hands in front of Waves of the Sea Kumgang in 2000.

Kim Song-gun is also called "Painter of the Waves" since he mostly paints sea and river sceneries with thunderous waters. Despite a very realistic depiction, the paintings carry a subtle kind of modern abstraction achieved through the dramatic presentation of the waves. One of these paintings, Waves of the Sea Kumgang, was noticed internationally due to a photo from Bill Clinton's state visit to North Korea in 2009 showing him sitting next to Kim Jong Il with the large, green waves of the painting in the background. Vladimir Putin was also photographed with Waves of the Sea Kumgang in the background, shaking hands with Kim Jong Il.

== Awards ==
- 1999: People's Prize for Waves of the Sea Kumgang
