= Sichuan Chengdu Shude High School =

Municipal public secondary school in Chengdu, Sichuan, China

- 四川省成都市树德中学
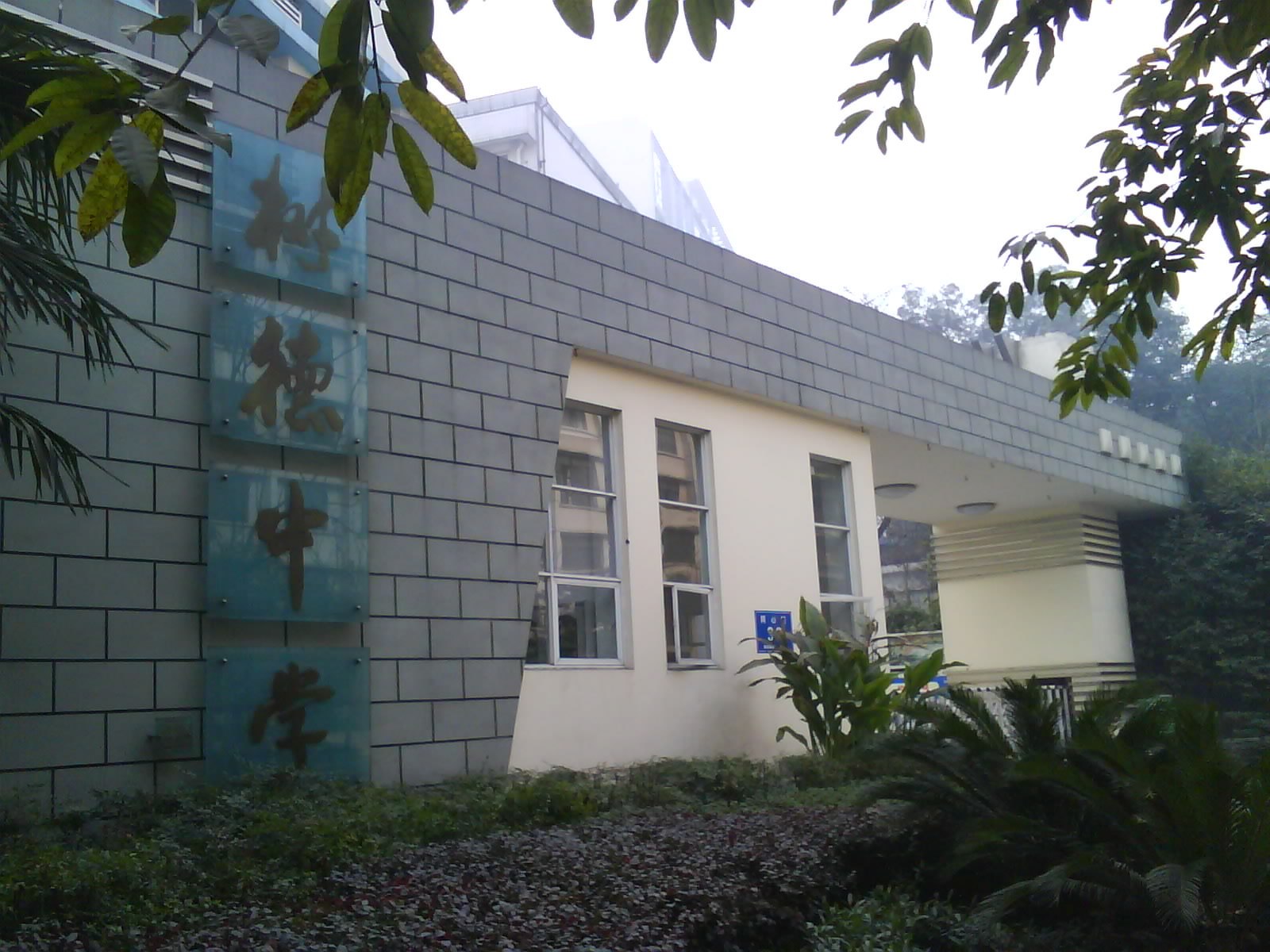
- The eastern gate of Chengdu Shude High School
- Chengdu, Sichuan, China

Information
- Type: National experimental high school
- Motto: 忠、勇、勤 "Loyalty, Courage, Diligence"
- Opened: 1929
- Founder: Sunzhen
- Educational authority: Chengdu Municipal Education Bureau
- Superintendent: Ms. Xia Hu
- Principal: Mr. Yuanbo Zhong
- Campus size: Guanghua campus: 12.2ha Foreign language campus: 8ha
- Website: www.sdzx.net

Sichuan Chengdu Shude High School (四川省成都市树德中学), also known as Sichuan Chengdu No. 9 High School, is a public secondary school in Chengdu, Sichuan, China. The school is operated by the Chengdu Municipal Education Bureau.

The school's name "Shu De" translates to "cultivation of morals."

== History ==
In 1929, Sun Zhen (孫震), the deputy general of the 29th Brigade of the National Revolutionary Army of the Kuomintang founded the first Shude Compulsory School. Between 1929 and 1932, Sun Zhen founded four other Shude Primary Schools. One of the primary schools was later expanded to include a middle school division, of which the boys' division was located at Shude Lane (樹德里) on Ningxia Street (寧夏街), and the girls' division was located at Shude Alley (樹德巷) on Ningxia Street (寧夏街).

In the fall of 1937, with the donations from the then Governor of the Sichuan Province, Li Jieren and Chairman Chen of the Jiale Paper Mill, the school was expanded to include a high school division. A school board was formed. Since then, Shude High School became a fully operating coeducational secondary cchool.

Following the establishment of the People's Republic of China, in 1950, the school was nationalized and renamed Chengdu No. 9 High School (成都九中) by the Chengdu Municipal People's Government.

== Branch schools ==
- Chengdu Shude Union School (成都树德联合中学)
- Chengdu Shude Experimental Middle School (成都树德实验中学)

=== International department ===
The International Department of Shude High School, jointly set up by Chengdu Shude High School and Chengdu Huaying Consulting and Service Ltd., was accredited by Chengdu Bureau of Education in 2002. (Verification No:(2005) 5). To date, the school offers the Victorian Certificate of Education (VCE), the International Baccalaureate (IB) and the Advanced Placement (AP) Program.
