= Xiamen Shuangshi High School =

Coordinates: 24.51586°N 118.15569°E

Xiamen Shuangshi Middle School Xiamen Shuangshi High School 福建省厦门双十中学 Fújiànshěng Xiàmén Shuāngshí Zhōngxué Hok-kiàn-séng Ē-mn̂g Siang-s'ip Tiong-o'h
- 33 Zhenhai Road (Junior Division); 789 Fanghu Road (Senior Division); Xiamen, Fujian, China

Information
- Type: Public
- Motto: Diligence, Fortitude, Faithfulness and Fidelity (勤毅信诚)
- Established: October, 1919
- Founder: Ma Qiaoru (马侨儒); Lin Zhuguang (林珠光)
- School district: Siming (Zhenhai campus); Huli (Fanghu campus)
- Principal: Ouyang Ling (欧阳玲)
- Website: www.sszx.cn

Xiamen Shuangshi High School (Shuangshi; simplified Chinese: 福建省厦门双十中学; traditional Chinese: 福建省廈門雙十中學; Pe̍h-ōe-jī: Hok-kiàn-séng Ē-mn̂g Siang-sip Tiong-o'h), also known as Xiamen No. 8 High School, is a public high school including both junior division (Secondary School, Grades 7-9) and senior division (High School, Grades 10-12). Shuangshi was founded in October 1919 by a group of overseas Chinese individuals residing in the Philippines, along with prominent business figures in Xiamen. In 1956, the school was reformed under government administration, becoming a public high school.

Currently, Shuangshi has two campuses. The founding campus (Zhenhai campus), which is now the campus for junior grade students, resides along Zhenhai Road which is neighbor to the center of the city; the newer campus (Fanghu campus), which is now for senior grade students, which has an area of about 110,000 m^{2}, is located aside the Fanghu Road East by the east shore of the island.

== History ==
- In 1919, Shuangshi was first founded at Xiaxizai Street, named "Xiamen Shuangshi Type-2 Business School". Business and journalism are the subjects firstly started. Mr. Lin Zhuguang was the chairman of the board and Mr. Ma Qiaoru was the first principal.
- In 1924, Shuangshi was moved to the current campus which is on the north of Hongshan Mount, and renamed to "Xiamen Private Shuangshi Business High School".
- In 1925, Shuangshi was extended to a standard high school which have all 6 junior and senior grades, and renamed to "Xiamen Private Shuangshi High School". Once, it was the high school has most students in Fujian province.
- In 1937, because of World War II, Shuangshi was transplanted to Pinghe County, which is in the mountainous area of West Fujian. Due to the high reputation of the school, the amount of the student exceeded 1,000.
- In 1946, following the end of World War II, Shuangshi relocated back to Xiamen.
- In 1956, the government took over Shuangshi and reformed it into a public school, renamed it to "Xiamen Shuangshi High School".
- In 1959, Shuangshi earned the honor of "Red Flag High School" and became one of the first Key High Schools in Fujian Province.
- In 1965, due to the chaos of Cultural Revolution, the school was renamed again to "Xiamen No.8 High School", and the operation was almost suspended.
- In 1976, after the end of Cultural Revolution, the school began to resume its operation.
- In 1979, the school was enlisted into the first priority Key High Schools of Fujian province.
- In 1983, the school name was restored to "Xiamen Shuangshi High School".
- In 1996, Shuangshi reached the standard of First Class Qualified High School of Fujian province.
- In 2006, a new campus on the east of Jinshang Road, the west of Xianhuang Road and the north of Fanghu Road East was established and came into operation as the campus of senior grades.

== Stories ==
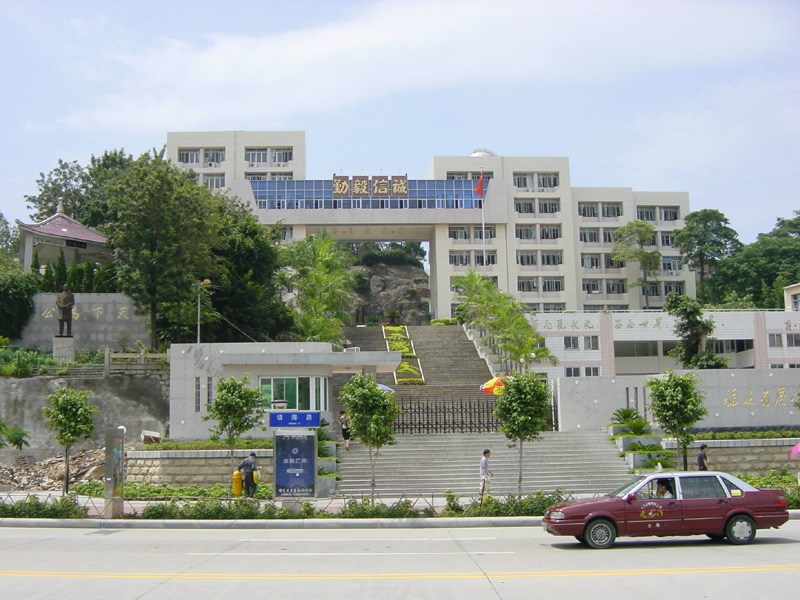
The view of Shuangshi's Zhenhai campus

- The name Shuangshi (双十), meaning Double Ten in Chinese, commemorates the Xinhai Revolution on October 10, 1911, led by Dr. Sun Yat-Sen.
- The anniversary of Shuangshi is October 10th, commemorating the Xinhai Revolution.
- The Zhenhai campus (the founding location) features 99 steps, symbolizing the school's encouragement for students to persevere through challenges.

== School Connections ==
- Taichung City Municipal Shuang-Shih Junior High School, Taiwan, since 2006.
- Wellington College and Wellington Girls' College, New Zealand, since 2008.

== Notable alumni ==
- Yanlin Zhuang Former chair-man of All-China Federation of Returned Overseas Chinese
- Huanzhi Li Famous Chinese Musician.

== International Coordination ==
- Joined the GLOBE Program since the 1990s.
- Held The 3rd Asian-Pacific Astronomy Olympiad in November, 2007.
