= Liaoning Shenyang Northeast Yucai School =

- 辽宁省沈阳市东北育才学校

Location
- Shenyang, Liaoning; China
- Coordinates: 41°42′21.46″N 123°25′51.46″E

Information
- Type: Public
- Established: May 1, 1949
- President: GAO Chen (高琛)
- Enrollment: 10,000
- Campus: Suburban, 164 acre
- Colors: Spring bud and Office green
- Information: (024)23783945
- Philosophy: 自信 自强 自豪
- Website: www.neyc.cn

Liaoning Shenyang Northeast Yucai School (辽宁省沈阳市东北育才学校) is a public secondary school in Shenyang, Liaoning, China.

NEYC has eight campuses in Shenyang City. The main campus (South Campus) covers an area of 164-acre (0.66 km^{2}) and a building area of 343,000 square meters.

== History ==
- 1927 to 1932 The school was an annex of Manchurian Special Educational School.
- 1933 to 1945 The school was an institute called Fengtian Chiyoda Primary School (Chinese 奉天 千代田 小学 fèng-tiān qiān-dài-tián xiǎo-xué; Japanese: 奉天の千代田小学校). The name Chiyoda is due to the name of a major road nearby. The school was aimed at the children who were the offspring of immigrants from Japan during World War II.
- Aug 1945 to 1946 The Republic of China government recovered Fengtian from Japan and renamed the road this school is named after "Zhong Hua Road" (Chinese: 中华路). The school closed on July 15, 1946 and the Japanese students moved back to Japan. They later established the Chiyoda Primary School Alumni Association (Japanese: 奉天千代田小学校同窓会).
- 1947 to 1948 After the People's Republic of China took over, the school was renamed Arts and Sciences School. It accepted students from Changbai Normal School briefly, who moved to Fushun later.
- 1949 to 1955 On May 1, 1949, Northeast Yucai School was established by proletarian revolutionists headed by Zhang Wentian and Xu Teli. The school was an institute children of members of the Chinese Communist Party with positions in the Army, Communist Party or the government of Northeastern China.
- 1985 till now It is known as Northeast Yucai School.

== Community ==
NEYC serves the education needs of Shenyang City. The city is the economic and political center of northeast China, with a population of 7.9 million. The school has eight campuses with a K-6, 7–9, 10-12 grade-level configuration and an enrollment of nearly 10,000 students.

== School ==
NEYC (main campus, the high school division) is a six-year public high school enrolling students in grades 7 through 12. Fully accredited by the Provincial Education Department of Liaoning, NEYC is one of the key high schools in Liaoning Province.

NEYC established the Group Education patterns “Varieties of main body, Go in different ways, Chancellor’s accountability, Autonomous schooling.”

== Campuses ==
=== North Campus ===
No. 100 Nanyi Road, Heping District, Shenyang

- Junior High Division

=== South Campus ===
No. 2 Gaogong Road, Hunnan New District, Shenyang

- Senior High Division
- Primary School Division
- International Division
- Math and Science Senior High Division
- Talented Experimental School Division
- Northeast Yucai Kindergarten
- Northeast Yucai Foreign Language School, No. 1 Gaorong Road, Hunnan new District, Shenyang

=== Huishan Campus ===
No. 200 Shenbei Road, Shenbei New District, Shenyang

- Northeast Yucai Bilingual Kindergarten
- Northeast Yucai Bilingual Primary School
- Northeast Yucai Bilingual Junior High School
- Northeast Yucai Bilingual Senior High School

=== Fushun Campus ===
No. 1 Yucai St, Shenfu New City, Fushun

- Northeast Yucai Experimental Kindergarten
- Northeast Yucai Experimental Primary School
- Northeast Yucai Experimental Junior High School
- Northeast Yucai Experimental Senior High School
- Northeast Yucai International High School (NYO)

=== Beihong Campus ===
No. 56 Hushitai South Ave, Shenbei New District, Shenyang

- Northeast Yucai Beihong School of Fine Arts

=== Dongguan Campus ===
No. 12 Yucai Xiang, Dongshuncheng South Street, Dadong District, Shenyang

- Gifted Division

== Presidents ==
- Li Liqun (李立群 Lǐ Lì-qún) (December 26, 1919– ) is the first president of the school. Her husband Gao Gang (高岗) was the chief party secretary and government leader of Manchuria (Northeastern China) from 1949 to 1952.
- 1985 - 2001 Ge Chaoding (葛朝鼎 Gě Cháo-dǐng)
- 2001 - 2007 Su Wenjie (苏文捷 Sū Wén-jié), director of the Bureau of Education of Shenyang
- 2007 - now Gao Chen (高琛 Gāo Chēn)

== Faculty ==
There are about 600 teachers in NEYC, 99.4% of whom have earned a bachelor's degree in national normal universities. More than 120 graduated from or are in a postgraduate course. About 100 teachers have been to the US, the UK, Australia, France, New Zealand, Canada and Japan to have professional improvement.

Experts and professors have been invited to be part-time teachers, among whom 15 persons have served the school for more than one year, including nine professors and research fellows, and four doctors. About 25 foreign teachers have been invited to work in the school each term.

== Curriculum ==
Each school year consists of two semesters with courses and subjects depending on the grade.

All students in the senior high school division (grades 10 to 12) have courses in Chinese Language, Math (including algebra, geometry and basic calculus), English Language, Physics, Chemistry, Biology, History, Geography, Economics, and Philosophy. All science courses include lab courses and lectures.

Four times a week students have elective courses. There are almost 35 elective courses in grades 9 through 11, such as Computer science, Pottery, Theatre and Drama, Chinese traditional painting, Art History and Appreciation.

Science Accelerated Programs are offered in Maths, Physics, Chemistry, Biology and Computer Science. Specialized Classes include Japanese Language, French Language, English Language, and Advanced Level Mathematics.

== German section ==
The school includes a section for German students. BMW Brilliance Automotive Ltd. and NYS jointly held the 2010 grand opening ceremony.

== Notable alumni ==
- Zhou Enlai, the first Premier of the PRC and the first Foreign Minister of the PRC
