= Zhengzhou Foreign Language School =

Public secondary school in Zhengzhou, Henan, China

Zhengzhou Foreign Language School 郑州外国语学校

Location
- Henan, China
- Coordinates: 34°48′54.67″N 113°33′48.84″E

Information
- Type: Public
- Established: 1983; 42 years ago
- Founder: Local government
- Enrollment: 4,000
- Campus size: 27.13 acres (109,800 m^{2})
- Website: www.zzfls.com.cn

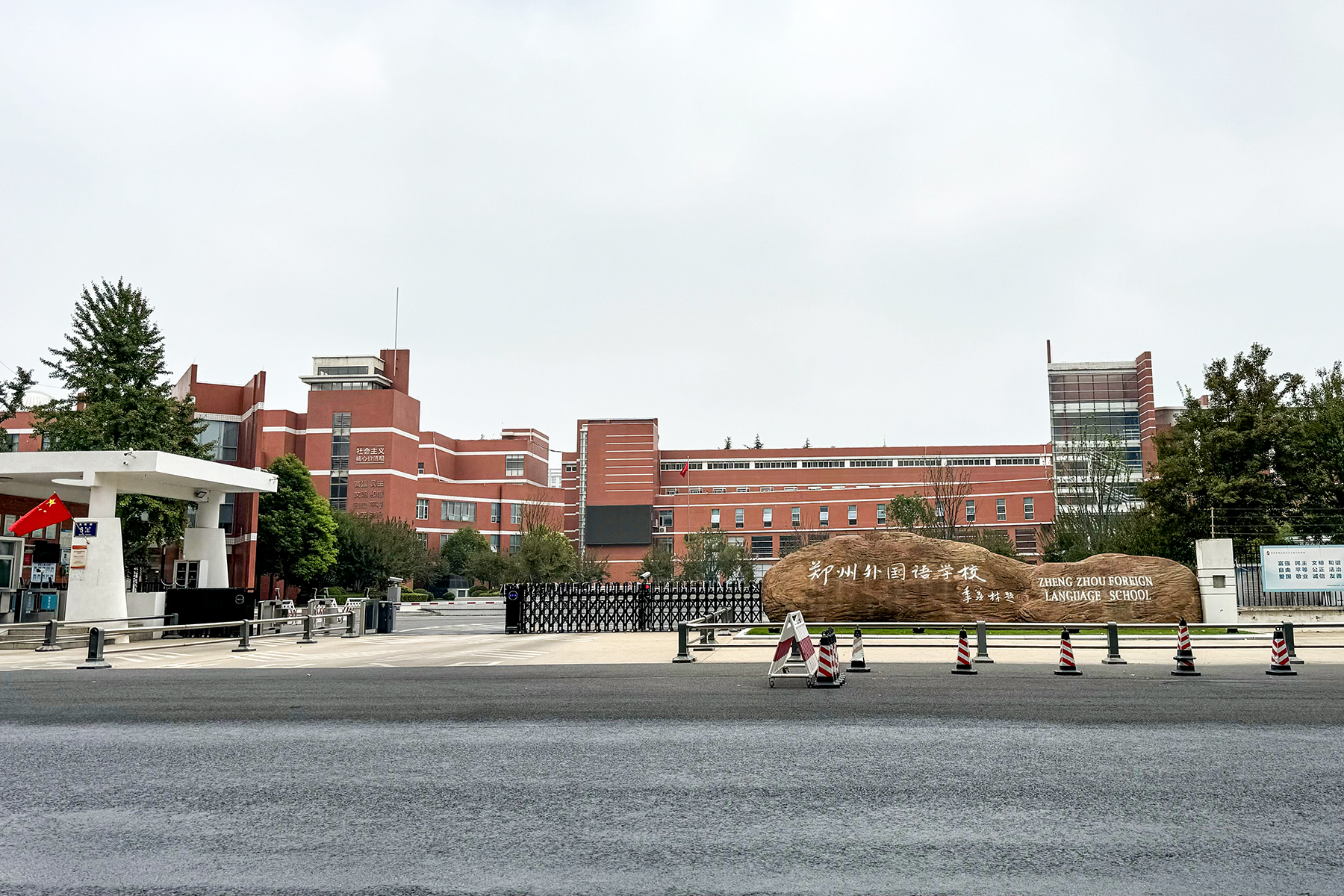
Zhengzhou Foreign Language School

Zhengzhou Foreign Language School (ZZFLS) is a public secondary school in Zhengzhou, Henan, China. The school was established in 1983.
