= High School Attached to Northeast Normal University =

- 东北师范大学附属中学

Location
- Main campus: No. 506 Ziyou Road, Chaoyang District, Changchun, Jilin Branch campuses: No. 818 Qinghua Road, Chaoyang District, Changchun, Jilin; No. 9000 Renmin St., Nanguan District, Changchun, Jilin; No. 377 Boxue Road, Jingyue District, Changchun, Jilin; China
- Coordinates: 43.863621°N 125.314522°E

Information
- Type: Public
- Motto: 志存高远 学求博深 (Chinese)
- Established: 1950
- Founder: 公木 陈元晖 吴伯箫等
- Principal: Shao Zhihao (邵志豪)
- Grades: 6+3+3 (Chinese Form)
- Enrollment: 8,654
- Nickname: 东师附中
- Affiliations: Northeast Normal University
- Website: msannu.cn

The High School Attached to Northeast Normal University (Chinese: 东北师范大学附属中学; pinyin: Dōngběi Shīfàn Dàxué Fùshǔ Zhōngxué), colloquially Dong Bei Shi Da Fu Zhong abbreviated to DBSDFZ (Chinese: 东北师大附中), is the affiliated high school of Northeast Normal University, and is often regarded as one of the most prestigious high schools in People's Republic of China. It has established sister school links with Hilltop High School of Chula Vista, No. 42 High School of Vladivostok and many other high schools. In a 2016 ranking of Chinese high schools that send students to study in American universities, DBSDFZ ranked number 43 in mainland China in terms of the number of students entering top American universities.

== History ==
The High School Attached to Northeast Normal University was established in 1950, and Chen Yuanhui was appointed as the first headmaster. At the end of 1950s, the school was rated as "the key high school of Jilin Province". In 1960, it was renamed as The High School Attached to Jilin Normal University. In 1972, it was renamed as Changchun No.66 High School. In 1984, its name was restored as its initial name.

== Campus arrangement ==
The school has six campuses now, including the main site (Ziyou Rd) where Year 10 and Year 12 were located, together with Qinghua Rd Campus currently occupied by Year 10s and 11s as well as Mingzhu Campus for Years 1 to 9.

Another campus is located in the Jingyue Development Zone.

One of the other two campuses is located in Beijing, called Chao Yang Campus.

In the year of 2015, Changchun No.26 Middle School became one more campus of the school where Year 7 to Year 9 were located. And the new campus is called Xin Cheng.

== Notable alumni ==
- Liu Xiaobo, who won a Nobel Peace Prize for his high-profile opposition to the Chinese government.
- Wang Zhongyu, former senior regional official and politician in China.
- Li Sisi, Chinese television host and media personality.
- Jia Zhijie, former senior regional official and politician in China.
- Wang Guosheng (general), served as commander of the Lanzhou Military Region.

== See also ==
- History of education in China#People's Republic
- Jilin City No.1 High School
- Jilin Yuwen High School
