= Zhenhai Middle School =

School in Ningbo, China

Coordinates: 29.956838°N 121.715579°E

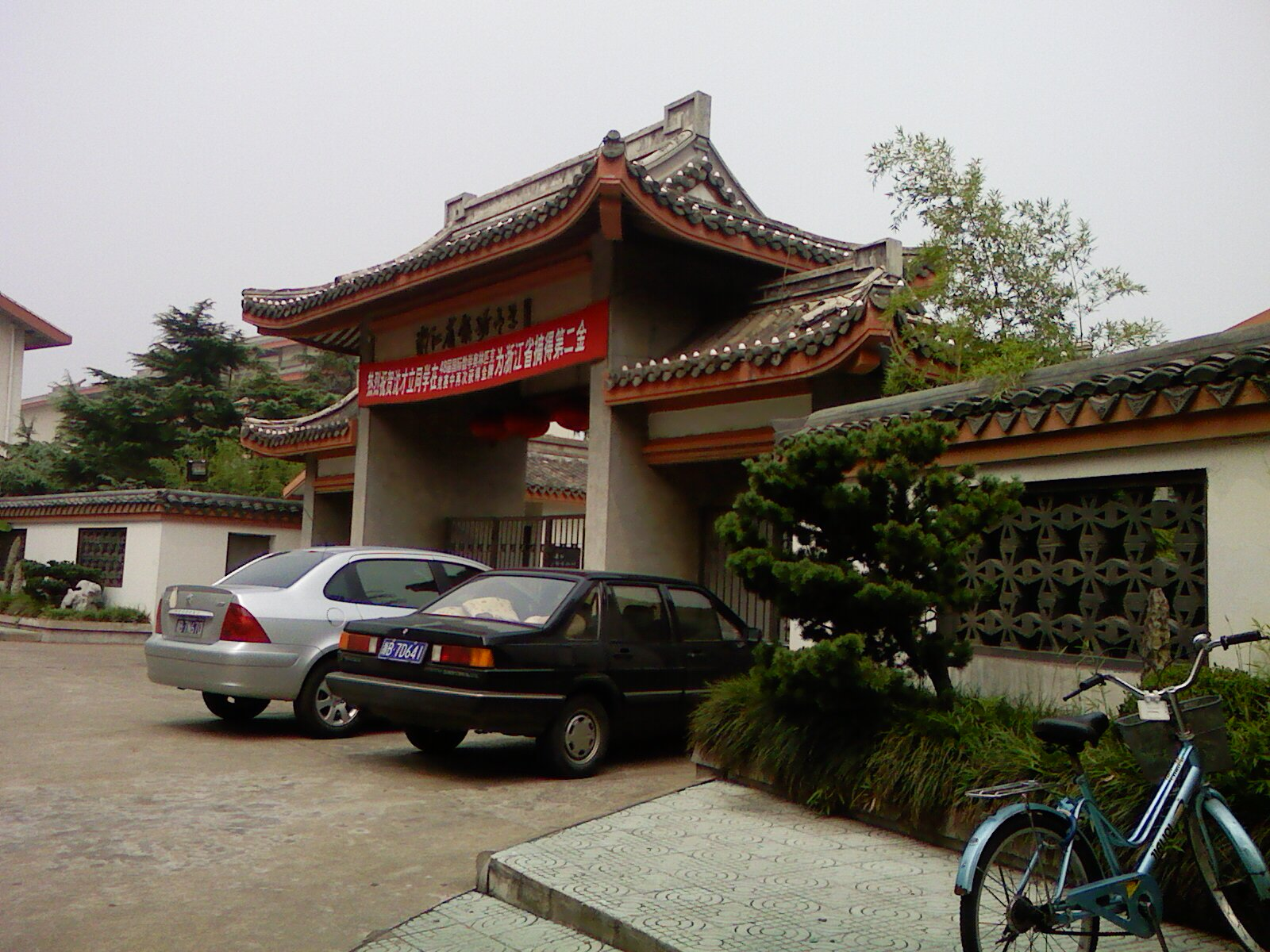
School gate

Zhenhai Middle School (Chinese: 镇海中学; pinyin: zhèn hǎi zhōng xué), or, in Western terms, Zhenhai High School, is a secondary school in Zhenhai, Ningbo, China. The campus is located in Zhenhai, Ningbo. The history of the school in its contemporary form can be traced back to 1911. It was converted to a business school for a short period during the Republic of China era. The school was forced to relocate several times during the Second World War, moving back to its original location in 1944. In 1956, it merged with Xincheng High School. In 1981, it was made one of the 18 "key high schools" in Zhejiang Province by the government. Its current principal is Wu Guoping. In a 2016 ranking of Chinese high schools that send students to study in American universities, Zhenhai Middle School ranked number 27 in mainland China in terms of the number of students entering top American universities.

== School History ==
In 1732 Jiaochuan Academy, the predecessor of the current Zhenhai High School, was founded as a school of Confucian teaching. The academy was rebuilt into a modern high school in 1911 by a local businessman, Sheng Weibing. Initially, what is today Zhenhai High School offered only a junior high school education. Its first principal was Cao Weikang. Built in the year of China's Republican Revolution, Zhenhai High School was dedicated to the mission of inculcating new thoughts in students and nurturing talents for a rapidly changing Chinese society.

== School Campus ==
The main campus sits on an area of 20 acres (80000 square meters) in Zhenhai, Ningbo. Due to the proximity of the school campus to Zhaobao Mountain and the estuary of Yong River, many historical sites are located within the campus, three of which are recognized as Major Historical and Cultural Site Protected at the National Level.

The historical sites within the campus include:

- Dacheng Hall, built in Taiping Heavenly Kingdom era
- Battle of Zhenhai naval victory monument pavilion
- Yu Dayou monument
- Lin Zexu ancestry hall

== Education ==
The students of Zhenhai High School mainly come from Ningbo, with a small proportion from other parts of Zhejiang Province.

The school's curriculum is largely oriented towards success on exams. Zhenhai High School has a reputation for good National College Entrance Examination performance.

Zhenhai High School emphasizes mathematics and science education. Students from Zhenhai High School have won numerous awards in national and international mathematics and science "olympiads" and other competitions.

In recent years, following the change in the government's education policy, Zhanhai High School has gradually moved away from the exam-oriented mode and has started to emphasize a well-rounded education. With newly expanded extra-curricular activities and diverse interest groups, Zhenhai High School students can pursue their individual interests in their spare time. Students have won top prizes in national invention competitions and national singing competitions.

The school underwent major renovation in 2000 as a result of government funding and donations. It has added a science experiment building, an IT building, a gymnasium, an indoor swimming pool, and a library with over 100,000 books.

== School culture ==
=== Boarding culture ===
Unlike many other schools in Ningbo, 80% of the student population of Zhenhai High School live in the school's dormitories. The school has strict boarding rules and regulations—for example, boarders have to arise each day by 6.30am, and there is study time for boarders each day from 6.15pm to 8.45pm. On weekends, the school organizes activities for those boarders staying in school. The activities includes movie screenings, concerts, and enrichment courses.

=== Arts festival ===
The school arts festival has been held in May every year since 1986. It lasts for two weeks. The school invites artists, scientists and alumni to give talks to students. There are also performances of student-directed dramas. During the festival, students' works on photography, calligraphy, and painting are exhibited in the school's multipurpose hall.

=== Sports meet ===
Every year in November, the school holds an annual sports meet. Students from both Jiaochuan Academy (former junior section) and Zhenhai High School senior section take part in the meet. Students compete for their own classes. At the end of the event, the class with best results will be named "the best sports class."

== Co-curriculum activities ==
Zhenhai High School has more than 20 extra-curricular activities, including Charity Workstation, football, basketball, volleyball, table tennis, swimming, band, Chinese orchestra, Chinese painting, Chinese calligraphy, maths and science interest groups, astronomy society, seismology club, library club, literature salon, etc., most of which are organized by students.

== Notable alumni ==
- He Xiantu: physicist
- Li Zhijian: physicist
- Lin Fanghua: mathematician, Bôcher Memorial Prize recipient
