= No.1 Middle School Affiliated to Central China Normal University =

School in Wuhan, China

Coordinates: 30.5055°N 114.3824°E

No.1 Middle School Affiliated to Central China Normal University (华中师范大学第一附属中学) is a middle school affiliated to the Central China Normal University located at Wuhan, Hubei province, China. Its motto is "Good Conduct, Clever, Graceful, Diligent and Quick to Act" (Chinese: 厚德 博雅 笃学 敏行; lit. 'Thick Moral values', 'Intelligent and Graceful', 'Diligent Learning', 'Rapidly Act')

== Size ==
According to the data until October 2018, there are two different campuses (including the middle school and the high school). There are around 5,000 students and 400 faculty members on the major campus of the school.

== History ==
The predecessor of No.1 Middle School Affiliated to Central China Normal University was the Central-South Experimental Speed-up School for Workers and Peasants (中南实验工农速成中学), which was founded by famous educators Pan Zinian (潘梓年) and Zhao Juntao (赵君陶）in 1950. In 1958 its name was changed to No.1 Middle School Affiliated to Central China Normal College, and it was later changed again to No.1 Middle School Affiliated to Central China Normal University in 1985. The main campus moved to Donghu New Technology Development Zone in 2005.

== Achievement ==
It was awarded with the name of "Hubei key school (湖北省重点中学)" by the government in 1962. In 2009, it ranked No.1 with a score of 76.4 (out of 100) in the "China High School Ranking According to Comprehensive Strength (全国高中综合实力排名前100强)" By 2014, it had won 22 gold medals, 4 silver medals and 1 bronze medal in the international middle school students' Olympic competition (including the chemistry, physics, mathematics, informatics and biology olympiads).
