= List of newsreels by country =

This is a list of newsreels by country.

== Argentina ==
- Sucesos Argentinos
- Noticiario Panamericano
- Argentina al día

== Australia ==
- Cinesound Productions
- Movietone News

== Belgium ==
- Belgavox

== Brazil ==
- Canal 100
- Cinejornal Informativo

== Bulgaria ==
- Kinokronika

== Canada ==
- Associated Screen News of Canada
- Canada Carries On and The World in Action were World War II-related newsreels produced by the National Film Board of Canada

== China ==
- China Today (1950 - 1993)
- Xinwen Jianbao (Chinese: 新闻简报) (1949 - 1977)
- New look at the motherland (Chinese: 祖国新貌) (1978 - 1993)
- Democratic Northeast (Chinese: zh:民主东北)

== Chile ==
- Noticiario Chileno Emelco
- Chile en marcha
- Noticiario Nacional
- Visión de Chile

== Finland ==
- Finlandia-katsaus
- Maailmalla tapahtuu
- Puolustusvoimain katsaus
- Sieltä täältä
- SF-katsaus

== France ==
- Fox Movietone, a French subsidiary produced by Fox Europa
- Gaumont-Actualités
- Pathé-Journal
- Éclair-Journal
- Actualités Françaises

== Germany ==
=== From 1925 to 1930 ===
- UFA Wochenschau

=== From 1930 to 1933 ===
- UFA-Tonwoche
- Deulig-Tonwoche
- Fox Tönende Wochenschau
- Emelka-Tonwoche
- Tobis Wochenschau

=== Nazi Germany ===
- UFA-Tonwoche (Until 1940)
- Die Deutsche Wochenschau (1940-1945)
- Panorama (1944-1945)

=== German Democratic Republic ===
- Der Augenzeuge

== Hungary ==
- Magyar Világhíradó (1924 - 1948)
- Magyar Filmhíradó (1948 - 1991)

== India ==
- Indian News Parade
- Indian News Review

== Indonesia ==
- Djawa Baharoe
- Chabar Dai Toa/Khabar Dai Toa
- Berita Film Di Djawa
- Wordende Wereld (Indo-Dutch Newsreel)
- Nampō Hōdō
- Berita Film Indonesia
- Gelora Indonesia (1951 - 1982)

== Italy ==
- Giornale LUCE
- La Settimana Incom
- Ciac
- Cinemondo (Corona Cinematografica)
- Obiettivo Cinegiornale
- Mondo Libero ASTRA
- Fox Cinegiornale

== Japan ==
- Mainichi World News/Daimai News (Mainichi Shimbun/Daiei/Riken) 1947–1970
- Nikkatsu World News/Mainichi News (Mainichi Shimbun/Nikkatsu) 1954–1993
- Nippon News/Asahi News (Asahi Shimbun/Nippon Eiga/Toho) 1940–1992
- Toei News (Toei Company/TV Asahi) 1959–1978
- Yomiuri International News (Yomiuri Shimbun/Shochiku) 1949–1997
- Ibaraki Diary (1948 - 2008)
- Kanagawa News (1950 - 2007)
- Aichi Prefecture News (1948 - 1993)
- Doumei News

== North Korea ==
- Korean Newsreel (1948–?)

== New Zealand ==
- Pictorial Parade (1951 - 1970)

== South Korea ==
- Haebang News (1945–1947)
- Korean News (1953–1994)

== Netherlands ==
- Polygoon

== Poland ==
- Polska Kronika Filmowa (1945-1994)

== Soviet Union ==
- Kino-Pravda (1922-1925)

== Spain ==
- No-Do (1943-1981)

== United Kingdom ==
- BBC Television Newsreel (1948-1954)
- Pathé News 1910-1970

== United States of America ==
- American Newsreel 1932-?
- Hearst Metrotone News 1914–1967
- Hearst-Vitagraph News Pictorial 1915-1916
- The March of Time (Warner Bros./Time, Inc.) 1935-1951
- Movietone News (20th Century Fox) 1928-1963
- Pathé News 1911-1956
- Paramount News (Paramount Pictures) 1925-1957
- Universal Newsreel (Universal Studios) 1929-1967

== Yugoslavia ==
- Films Novosti

== See also ==
- California Newsreel
