= Embassy Theatre (New York City) =

Former movie theater in Manhattan, New York

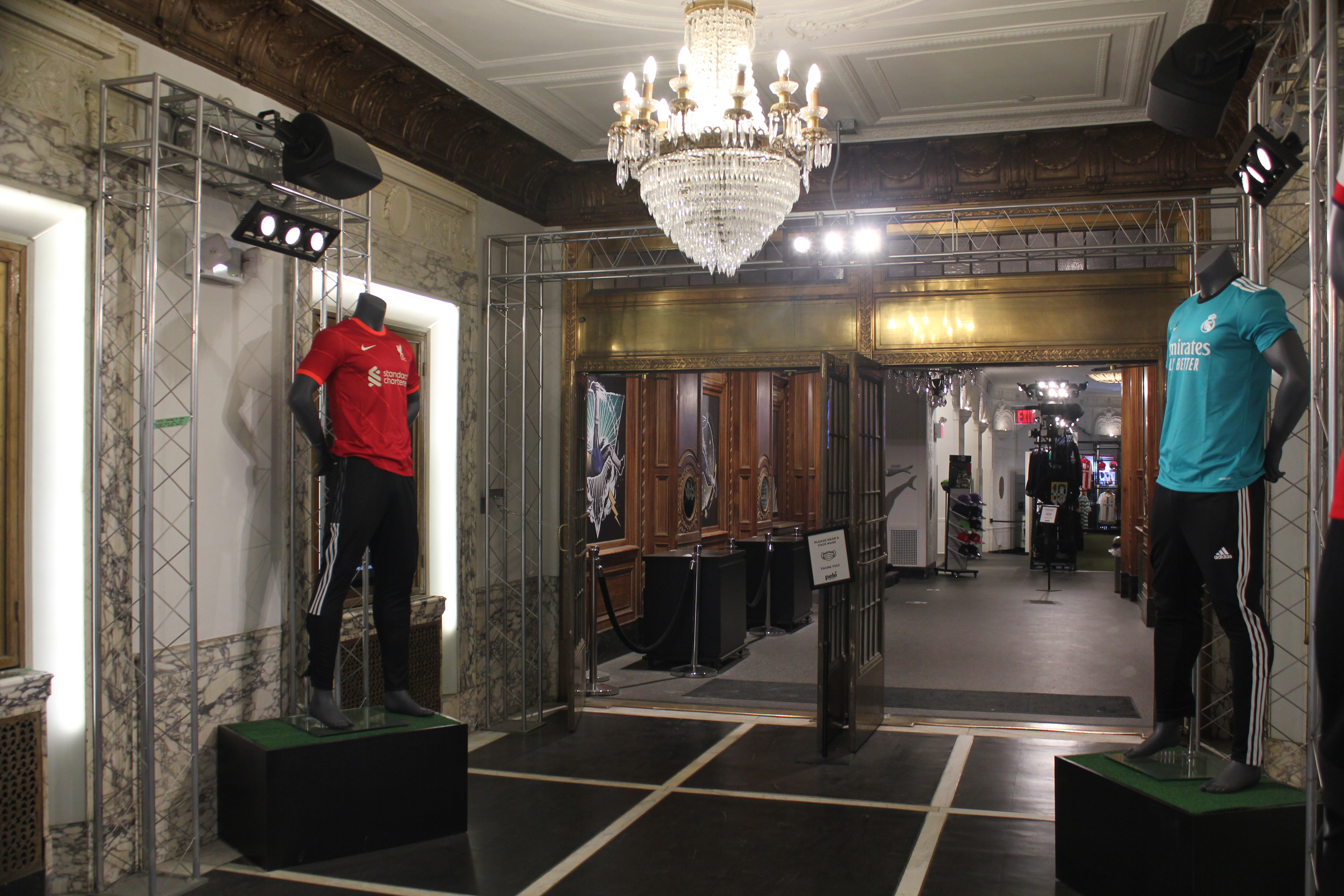
- The outer lobby of the old Embassy Theater, now a store entrance
- Interactive map of Embassy Theatre
- Former names: Embassy I Theatre
- Address: 1560 Broadway; Manhattan, New York; United States
- Coordinates: 40°45′31″N 73°59′04″W
- Owner: GFP
- Operator: SL Green
- Capacity: 598 (historical)
- Type: Former cinema

Construction
- Opened: August 26, 1925
- Renovated: 1998, 2019
- Closed: 1997 (as theater)
- Years active: 1925–1997
- Architect: Thomas W. Lamb

New York City Landmark
- Designated: November 17, 1987
- Reference no.: 1330
- Designated entity: Lobbies and auditorium interior

The Embassy Theatre, also known as the Embassy 1 Theatre, is a former movie theater at 1560 Broadway, along Times Square, in the Midtown Manhattan neighborhood of New York City, New York, U.S. Designed by Thomas W. Lamb, the theater opened in 1925 on the ground floor of 1560 Broadway, the headquarters of the Actors' Equity Association. While no longer in use as a theater, the space is preserved as a New York City designated landmark, and it continues to operate as a store.

Within the former theater, an entrance vestibule connects to an outer lobby with marble trim and a coved ceiling. The inner lobby, decorated with woodwork and mirrors, was originally used to sell tickets; it was designed in a similar manner to the outer lobby. The auditorium originally had 598 seats, which were arranged on a single raked floor, facing a proscenium arch with a movie screen. The side walls of the auditorium contain piers with lighting fixtures, behind which are murals by Arthur Crisp. The ceiling contains plasterwork decoration and lighting fixtures by the Rambusch Decorating Company, including a central recessed dome. These design details remain intact except for the removal of the original seats and movie screen.

The theater opened on August 26, 1925, and was originally operated by Metro-Goldwyn-Mayer (MGM). Its first manager, Gloria Gould, staffed the theater almost exclusively with young women. After Guild Enterprises began operating the Embassy in 1929, the theater became the first newsreel theater in the United States. The decline of the newsreel format forced the Embassy to revert to showing films in 1949. The New York City Landmarks Preservation Commission designated the theater as an interior landmark in 1987, and the Embassy showed its last film in 1998. The Times Square Business Improvement District renovated the theater into a visitor center, which operated from 1998 to 2014. Following another renovation, the Embassy reopened in 2019 as a store themed to soccer star Pelé.

== Description ==
The Embassy Theatre is part of the Actors' Equity Building at 1560 Broadway. The building is on the east side of Seventh Avenue between 46th and 47th Streets, in the Theater District of Midtown Manhattan in New York City, New York, U.S. It faces Duffy Square, the northern end of Times Square. The Actors' Equity Building abuts the I. Miller Building to the south, as well as TSX Broadway and the Palace Theatre to the north. The land under the building is owned by Actors Equity, while the building itself is owned by GFP. The theater is part of the building's retail space, which SL Green leases from GFP.

The theater was completed in 1925 and was designed by Thomas W. Lamb, with decorations by the Rambusch Decorating Company. It is housed in what was originally a retail space for men's clothes. The theater retains the floor plan of the original retail space; the floor and the ceiling are both at the same height as the original retail space. As of 2019, the old Embassy Theatre itself is a retail space.

=== Lobbies ===
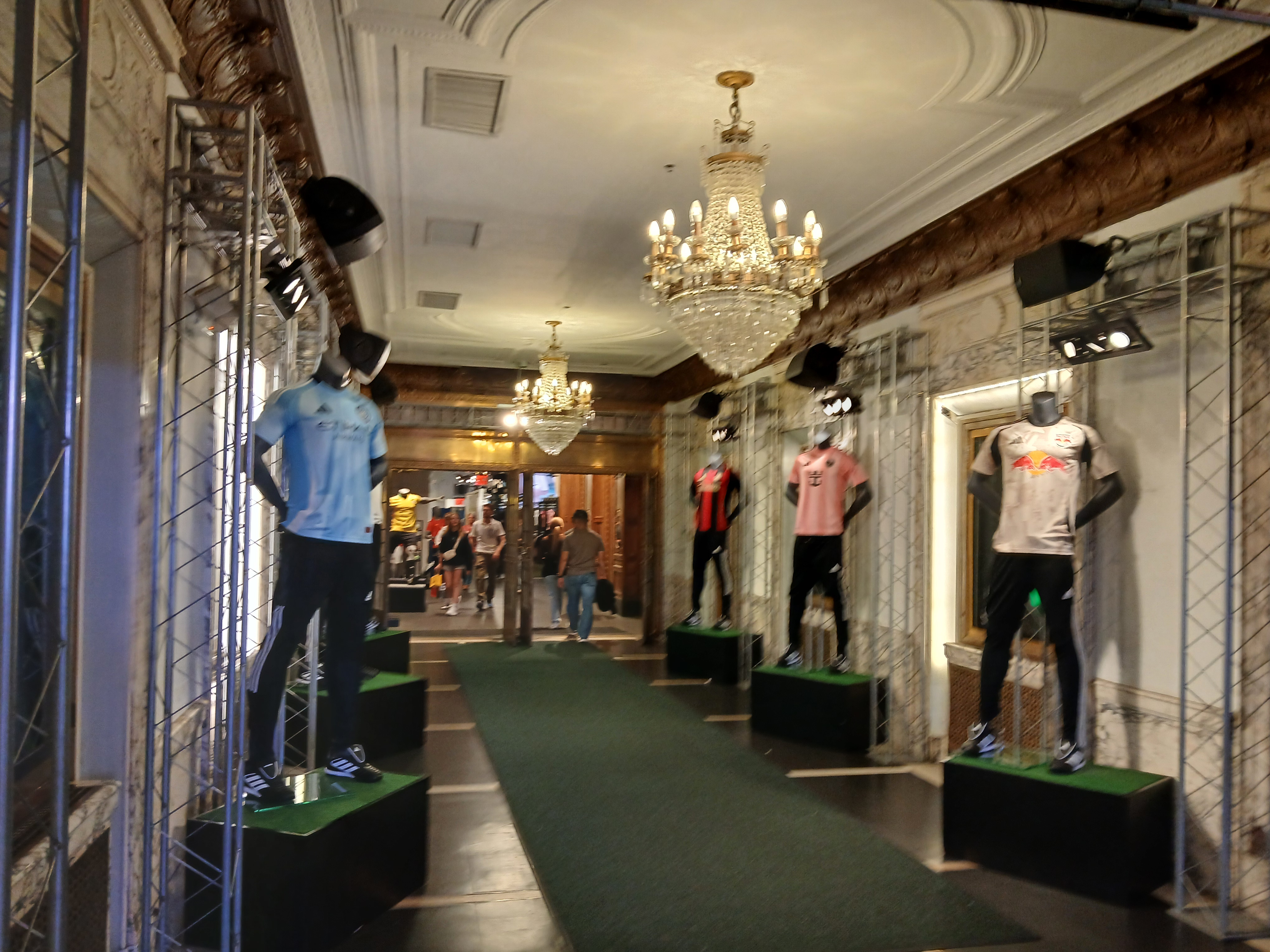
View down the outer lobby

The theater's entrance vestibule has been modified several times since it opened. There are two lobbies: an outer lobby with marble trim and an inner lobby with woodwork. The outer lobby measures 40 feet (12 m) long and connects the theater's entrance vestibule and inner lobby. The inner lobby leads further inward into what was originally the auditorium. The lobby spaces are similar in design details.

==== Outer lobby ====
Two sets of double doors lead from the entrance to the outer lobby. Each door is made of bronze with 20 glass panes; a transom window runs above the doors. The outer lobby's floor consists of black tile squares, separated by a grid of white marble. The space includes veined marble walls with wainscoting and illuminated sign displays. As of 2019, the walls contain freestanding and wall-mounted truss structures with displays of sport wear. A plasterwork frieze, containing motifs of medallions and swags, runs at the top of the walls. The coved ceiling is surrounded by a molded band and contains two overhanging brass-and-crystal chandeliers, as well as ceiling vents for air conditioning. The outer and inner lobbies are separated by two brass-and-glass double doors, similar to those between the entrance and the outer lobby.

==== Inner lobby ====
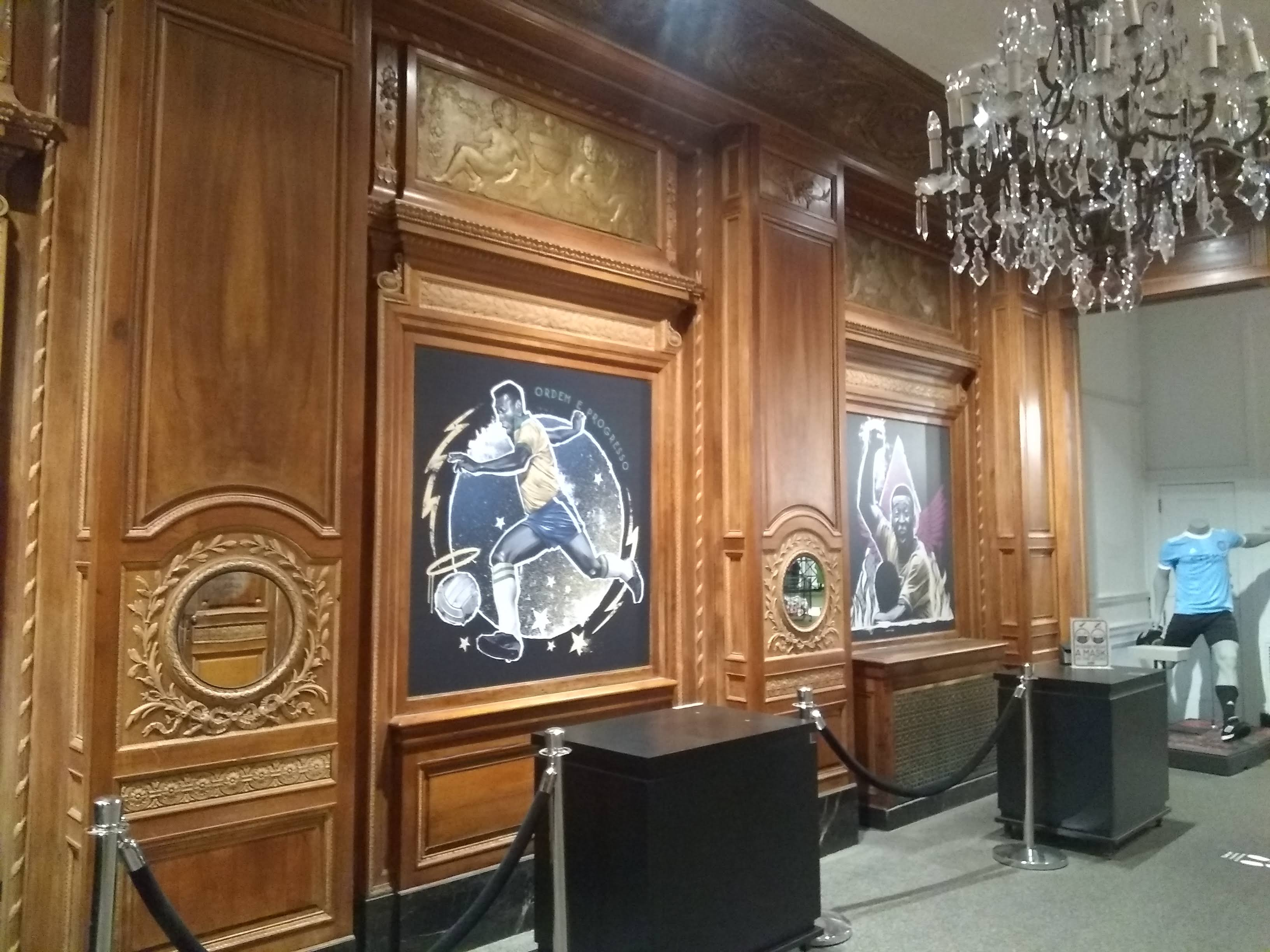
Woodwork of the inner lobby

The woodwork of the inner lobby was intended to give an intimate feeling. The space originally contained a ticket booth, and the renovated inner lobby contains a counter near the north wall. The walls contain blond-wood paneling with square mirrors; while these mirrors still exist, they are covered with vinyl stickers. Above the square mirrors are entablatures with friezes made of burled walnut, as well as gold-colored bas-relief panels with putti and vases. The square mirrors are separated by projecting, wood-paneled piers on each wall. The piers contain circular mirrors surrounded by carved wreaths. The coved ceiling is surrounded by a plasterwork frieze. The center of the ceiling has a gilded medallion, from which hangs a brass-and-crystal chandelier.

The inner lobby's south wall included entrances to lounges for men and women. The lounge was decorated in a Francois I style, while the women's lounge was designed in a "Chinese Chippendale" style. Public telephones were placed in both rooms. These spaces have since been redecorated.

=== Auditorium ===
The former auditorium is accessed from the inner lobby and was designed with a single level of seating. There was neither a balcony nor boxes. Originally, the auditorium had 598 seats, later cited as 582. The original seats contained tapestry coverings; lacquered carmine-colored arms; and lacquered black-and-gold seat backs. Aisles ran along each side of the auditorium. The room has a slightly raked floor that slopes down toward the proscenium arch on the east wall. The Pele Soccer store's floor is largely a flat surface placed on footings above the raked floor, which is still extant. The store's raised floor is designed to resemble a soccer field. To the north and south of the raised floor are ramps that are actually part of the original raked floor.

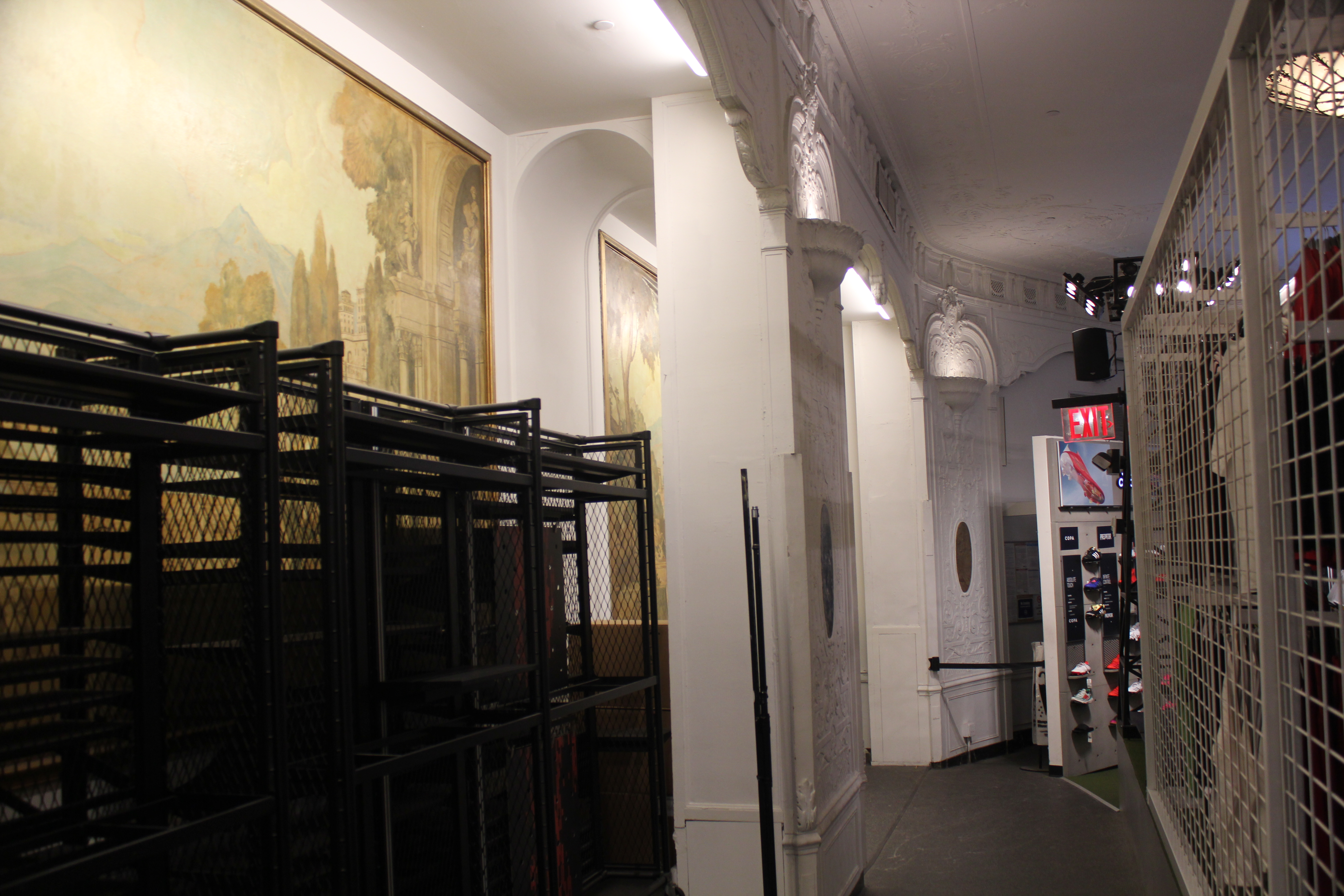
North wall, with Arthur Crisp's murals directly behind

On the north and south walls of the auditorium are four piers. Each pier contains oval marble panels surrounded by floral designs, as well as gilded lighting fixtures above the marble panels. These piers were originally decorated with gilded details, and damask curtains were draped between the piers. The piers are topped by arches containing grotesque heads. The lighting fixtures were designed so they appeared to be resting on mermaids' backs. Air vents were placed within the bottoms of each pier. This created what Exhibitor's Trade Review magazine called "the latest and most effective heating and ventilation system". The walls are topped by a cornice with brackets and paneling; this cornice contains some air-conditioning grilles. There were formerly "gilded Hermes" above some of the piers.

Behind the piers are six murals painted by Arthur Crisp. The six murals are decorated with architectural subjects. Two additional murals formerly existed near the proscenium, flanking the organs there. The organ itself was a three-manual console, leased for two years from M. P. Möller from 1925 to 1927. By the late 1980s, the two murals near the proscenium had been removed, while the remaining murals were in poor condition. The two murals near the rear of the auditorium were visually divided by a sound wall, although they remained physically intact. The remaining murals were restored in 2019 as part of the Pele Soccer store's construction. The westernmost mural on the north wall had been damaged, so a freestanding sign describing the theater's history was placed in front of the damaged mural.

The east wall of the auditorium contains the proscenium arch. In front of the arch, there was originally a stage measuring about 4 feet (1.2 m) deep, as well as an orchestra pit and a motion-picture screen. The screen was removed in 1997 and replaced with a mural by artist Jessica Daryl Winer. Entitled Curtain Call, the mural depicted 200 notable Broadway personalities. The modern Pele Soccer store has an LED display within the proscenium opening, measuring 13 feet 2 inches (4.01 m) tall by about 22 feet (6.7 m) wide.

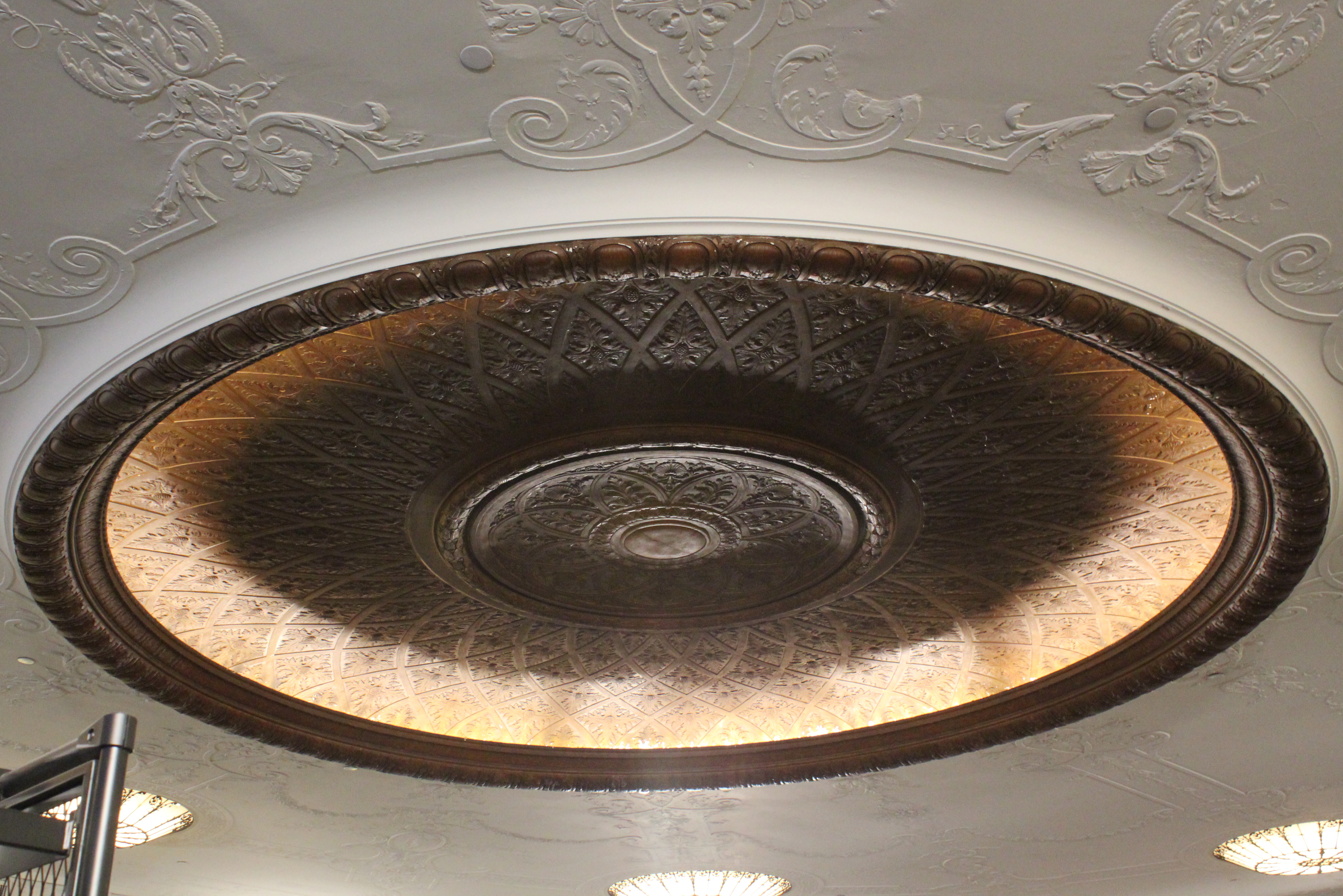
The large recessed ceiling dome

The auditorium's ceiling is mostly flat but is designed with plasterwork in low relief. The center of the ceiling has a wide recessed dome, which is surrounded by eight smaller brass-and-crystal lighting panels. The central dome is surrounded by gilded filigree decorations, which were subsequently painted cream to match the surrounding ceiling. Rambusch Studio designed the lighting fixtures. According to Exhibitor's Trade Review, the lighting fixtures were designed specifically for the theater, with a mixture of direct and indirect lighting.

== History ==
Movie palaces became common in the 1920s, between the end of World War I and the beginning of the Great Depression. In the New York City area, only a small number of operators were involved in the construction of movie palaces. These theaters' designers included the legitimate-theater architects Thomas W. Lamb, C. Howard Crane, and John Eberson. In particular, many movie palaces were built around the Times Square area in the early 20th century.

=== Original theater use ===
Billboard magazine reported in April 1925 that Joel Weinstock would operate the 600-seat Embassy Theatre adjacent to the Palace Theatre, a vaudeville house. The Embassy was planned to be the first movie house in New York City to operate 24 hours a day, charging 25 cents for admission at all hours. In July 1925, it was announced that socialite Gloria Gould had signed a contract to manage the new theater, which would be operated by Metro-Goldwyn-Mayer. Nineteen years old at the time, Gould was described in Exhibitors' Trade Review as "the youngest person, either male or female, to have ever achieved the distinction of directing a modern motion picture theatre, and that in the great metropolis of the world". Also unusual was that Gould had no previous experience managing a cinema. The Embassy Theatre officially opened on August 26, 1925, with the film The Merry Widow. Opening-night tickets were $5.50 each (equivalent to $101 in 2025); about half the audience were "local or national celebrities", protected by a police reinforcement.

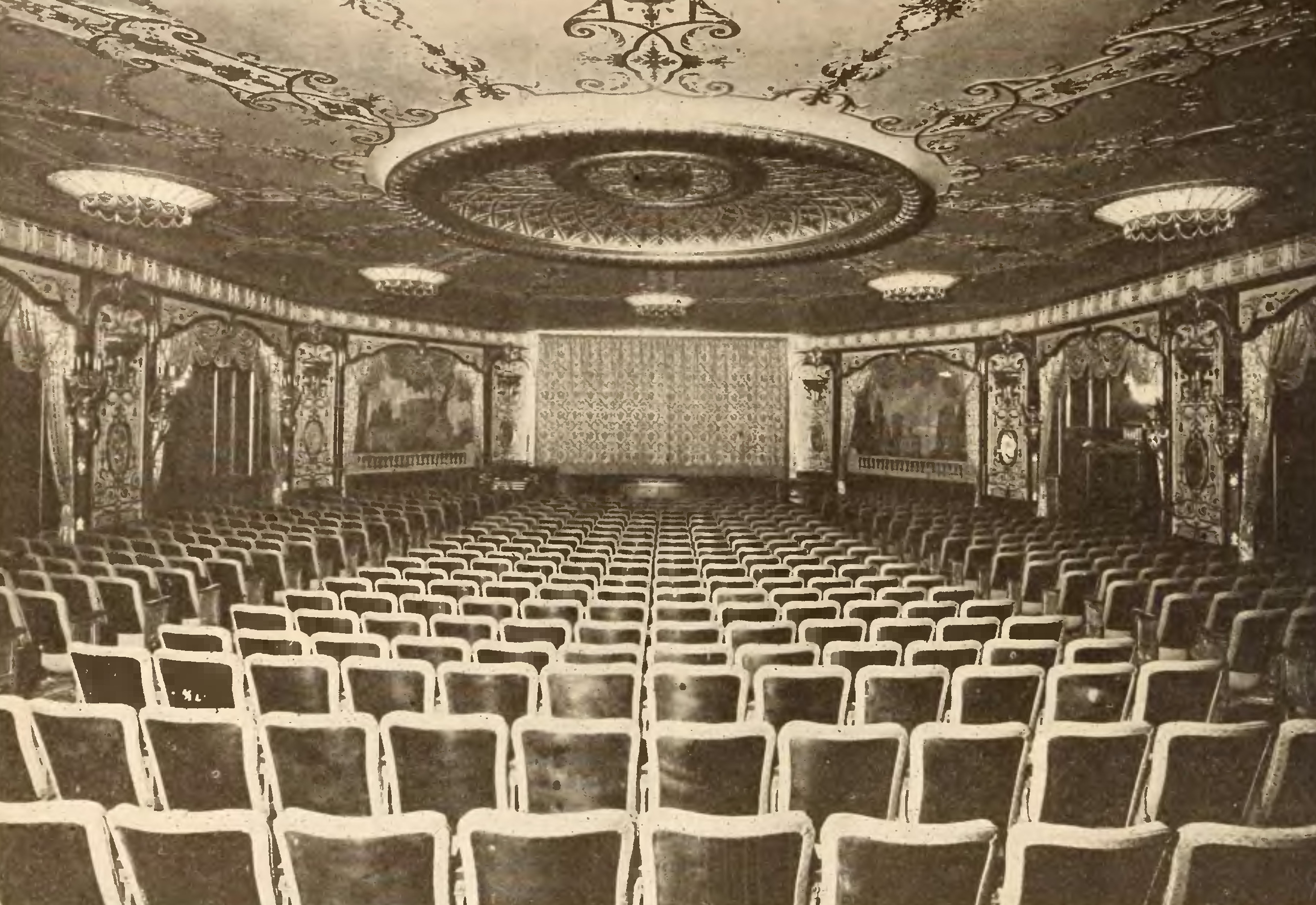
Embassy Theatre of New York City in Motion Picture News, September–October 1925

When the theater opened, Gould said the theater would not host any comedies or newsreels. All seats were reserved and cost $2 each (equivalent to $37 in 2025), (Note: Subsequently cited as $2.20 each, equivalent to $40 in 2025.) as Gould wanted the theater to cater to impatient "society people", rather than the general public. Furthering the Embassy's exclusive nature, "beggars, vagrants, peddlers, bootleggers and blind persons" were not allowed to enter. Gould also announced that all of the Embassy's staff would be women, from the ushers to the musicians, in the belief that women could work more efficiently than men; she said MGM vice president Major Bowes supported the effort. Gould's ushers had to be blondes in their late teens or early twenties, (Note: Gould was quoted as saying that her staff was 16 to 20 years old, while a New York Times article from 1998 said the women were 17 to 21 years old. The New York City Landmarks Preservation Commission, citing the New York Daily Mirror, said the women were between the ages of 17 and 20.) at most 5 feet 4 inches (1.63 m) tall, with white teeth and the "ability to wear clothes with dignity". Almost four hundred women applied for staff positions, including a "white-haired widow" and a "daughter of a Russian general", according to Gould. According to the American Guild of Organists, there were still four men on staff: a porter and three operators.

The Embassy initially only had two screenings daily: one at 2:45 p.m. and the other at 8:45 p.m. By October 1925, the popularity of The Merry Widow had prompted the theater's management to add a third screening on weekends at 6 p.m. Six weeks after the theater opened, Gould traveled to Paris, claiming she needed to "rest" from her "interesting theatrical work"; however, she subsequently sought legal residence there. The Embassy's film offerings in 1926 included Mare Nostrum, La Bohème, Ben-Hur, and Tell It to the Marines. Ticket prices had dropped to $0.50 or $1.00, as the concept of reserved seats was no longer novel nor in high demand, especially with the development of larger movie houses. Other films shown at the Embassy in its early years included Slide, Kelly, Slide, Annie Laurie, Hula, and Love in 1927; Submarine, The Cavalier, and The Viking in 1928; and Bellamy Trial and Father and Son in 1929.

=== Embassy Newsreel Theatre ===
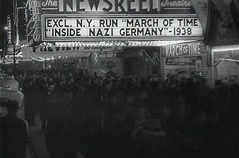
Marquee of the Embassy Newsreel Theatre during its exclusive New York City run of Inside Nazi Germany—1938, a March of Time short film later inducted into the National Film Registry

In October 1929, William Fox took over the Embassy, with plans to use the theater exclusively for displaying Movietone newsreels. The theater was the first of its kind to feature newsreels with sound (although the first sound newsreel had been created in 1927 at the Sam H. Harris Theatre), and it was the first exclusive newsreel theater in the U.S. (Note: While the Embassy is sometimes cited as the first all-newsreel theater in the world, a theater dedicated exclusively to newsreels already existed in London in 1909.) The Embassy incurred a relatively high cost of $500 per week for one reel, a price no one was willing to pay. The first newsreel was screened on November 2, 1929, with footage of news items such as the city's 1929 mayoral election debates and the Wall Street Crash. There was a ticket price of 25 cents (equivalent to $5 in 2025) for an hour-long show. Screenings took place every hour from 10 a.m. to midnight. As part of an opening-week promotion, the Embassy distributed tickets to thousands of residents.

The renamed Embassy Newsreel Theatre saw six or seven thousand visitors per day in its first two weeks as a newsreel theater. The newsreels were completely changed every week, and the theater was on the heavily traveled Times Square, adding to the Embassy's popularity. By 1930, Movietone's editor E. L. Harvey said the Embassy had "far outgrown its original plans" of being "a show window on Broadway for Fox News". The Embassy's newsreels included the first sound reel of a whale being captured; a tribute to U.S. president Calvin Coolidge; the rise of Adolf Hitler; appearances by Pope Pius XI and J. P. Morgan Jr. and the trial and sentencing of several men who kidnapped oil magnate Charles F. Urschel. Fox Movietone published advertisements saying, "The Embassy Newsreel grossed more than $11,000 in a 550-seat house showing only Fox Movietone News."

The Embassy Theatre's lease expired in January 1934, and the theater was dark for several weeks because of conflicts over the lease. In early February 1934, the Bethlehem Engineering Corporation leased the theater to Newsreel Theatres Inc., managed by Francis C. Wood Jr. Newsreel Theatres Inc. announced plans to reopen the Embassy for newsreel use, and the theater reopened on February 12, 1934, as the Embassy Pathé News Theatre, showing newsreels from Pathé News. The theater had 9,000 visitors in the first four days after it reopened. Among the newsreel stories shown at the Embassy under Pathé News' operation were Bruno Richard Hauptmann's trial in 1935, as well as a 1938 film on the Nazi Party. William French Githens, who helped run Newsreel Theatres Inc. with Francis Carter Wood Jr., recalled that U.S. president Franklin D. Roosevelt was "the greatest single attraction", with patrons flocking by the hundreds to watch Roosevelt's fireside chats.

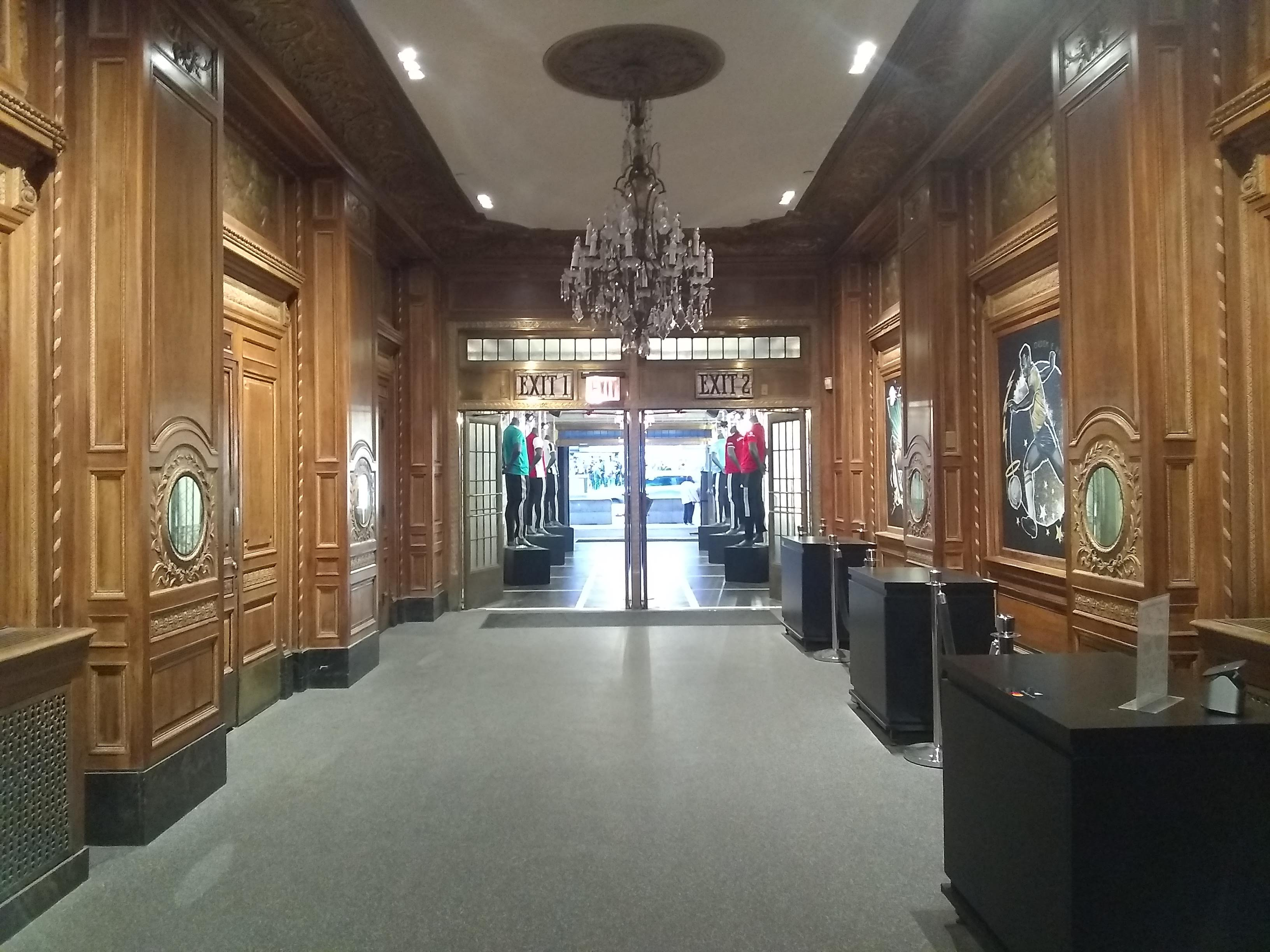
View from inner lobby toward outer lobby

The Embassy Newsreel continued into the 1940s despite the growing popularity of the television. The Embassy Newsreel Theatre grew into a chain with locations on 50th and 72nd Street as well as the original theater on Times Square. As a whole, the newsreel industry was impacted negatively by World War II, when studios began sharing footage with each other to reduce costs, which consequently resulted in a decrease in competition between newsreel studios (and thus less content). Furthermore, there was growing criticism of the newsreels' tendencies to dramatize factual events, as well as the fact that newsreels discussed stories in a decreasing order of importance. In November 1949, it was announced that the Embassy would revert to showing feature films. Githens said he had decided to return the Embassy to cinematic use specifically because newsreels could no longer compete with television.

=== Return to feature films ===
Norman Elson, a son-in-law of prolific theater architect Herbert J. Krapp, took over the Embassy in 1950. When the Embassy was revived as a feature-film theater, it was renamed the "Broadway-Embassy", with the films Quartet and The Hidden Room. The Broadway Embassy had only showed films for two months when it returned to showing newsreel clips during the daytime in January 1950. Under the new policy, the newsreels were changed every Wednesday and Sunday, with a 25-cent admission price between 5 p.m. That April, the Embassy's management considered showing feature films that had won Academy Awards. Under the reinstated newsreel policy, the Embassy showed the documentary Cassino to Korea in 1950. The Embassy was often used for showing short documentaries, which were advertised on the outer lobby's signs, during the early 1950s.

By December 1952, the theater had again returned to showing feature films because newsreels were facing greater competition from television. The Embassy's features in the 1960s included numerous French and Italian films. During this decade, Alfie ran at the Embassy for over six months in 1966, being the longest-running English-language film to be shown at the theater. This was followed in the 1970s by films such as Take a Girl Like You (1970) and Battle for the Planet of the Apes (1973). In its later years, the Embassy Theatre on Times Square was also called the Embassy I to distinguish it from similarly named theaters in Manhattan. (Note: These included the Embassy 72nd Theatre on the Upper West Side, the Embassy Theatre at 153 West 49th Street, and the Embassy 2,3,4 Theatre on the northeast corner of Seventh Avenue and 47th Street. All of these theaters have been demolished.)

By the 1980s, many of Times Square's cinemas had closed and had been modified or demolished, but the Embassy I remained active, with its architectural details being largely preserved. The New York City Landmarks Preservation Commission (LPC) had started considering protecting the Embassy as an official city landmark in 1982, with discussions continuing over the next several years. Norman Elson's son Peter favored the designation, and the LPC designated the theater as an interior landmark on November 17, 1987. This was part of the commission's wide-ranging effort in 1987 to grant landmark status to theaters in Midtown Manhattan. The Embassy was one of the few movie theaters being considered as a landmark; most of the other theaters were Broadway houses whose facades and interiors were both being considered as landmarks. The New York City Board of Estimate ratified the designation in March 1988.

=== Commercial use ===
==== Times Square Information Center ====
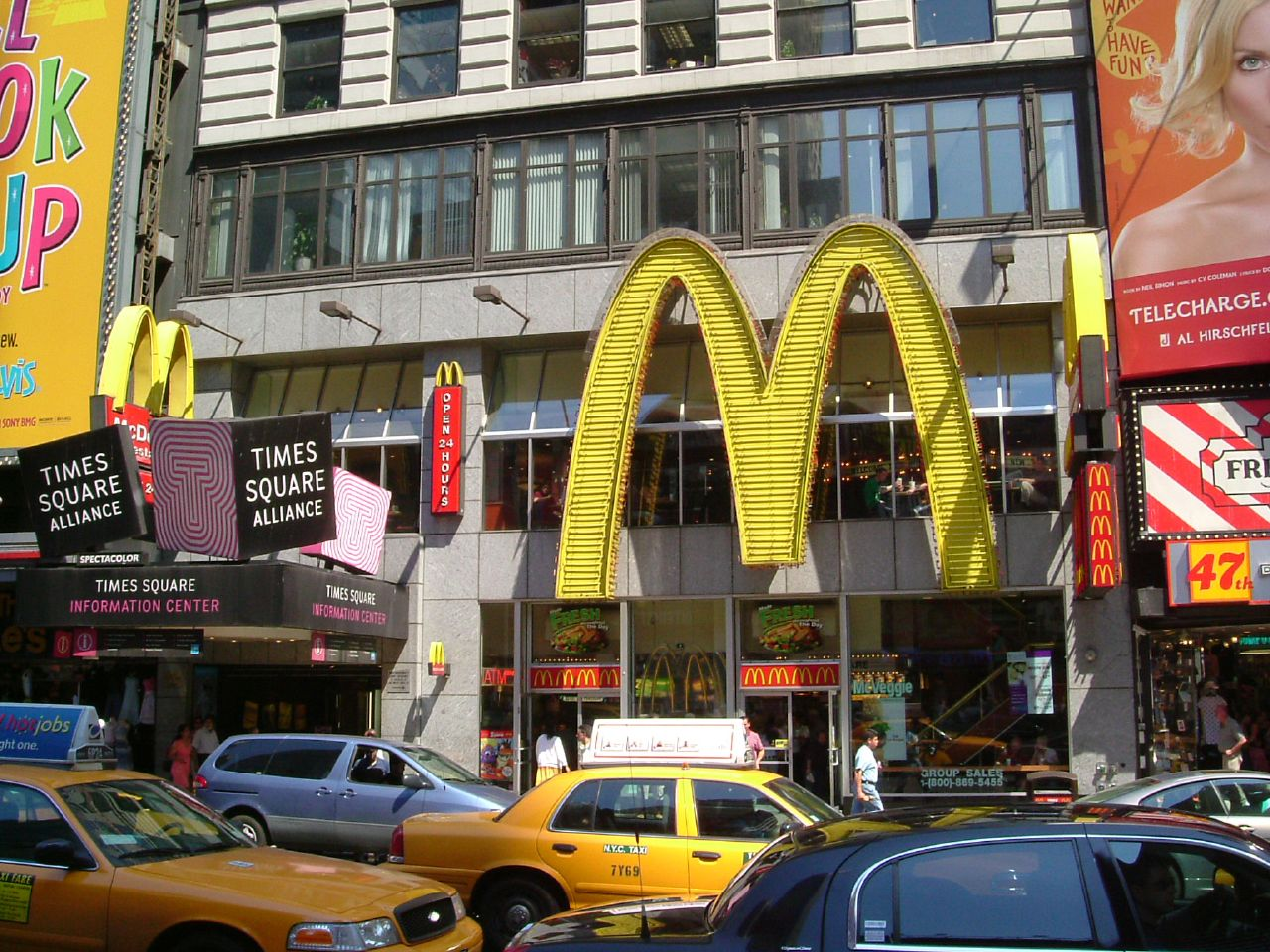
Entrance to the Times Square Information Center (left) as seen from across Seventh Avenue

By February 1997, the Times Square Business Improvement District was planning to open a visitors' center in the theater. At the time, the visitor center was housed in the Selwyn Theatre, which was planned to be renovated as part of the 42nd Street redevelopment project. Guild Enterprises' lease on the Embassy was also about to expire, and the single-screen cinema faced competition from two upcoming multiplexes in Times Square: the AMC Empire 25 and a 13-screen Sony Theaters house. The Embassy Theatre closed in December 1997, the same month that the Selwyn Theatre's facade collapsed, rendering that building unusable. In February 1998, the Times Square BID announced that it would spend $1 million to turn the Embassy into a visitor center. Ronnette Riley designed the renovation, while EverGreene Architectural Arts was hired to restore the decorative finishes. Most of the former seats were removed and sold to churches in Brooklyn. The project cost $1.1 million.

A press preview for the Times Square Information Center took place on September 1, 1998, and the center was opened to the public the next day. The Times Square Information Center's inner lobby had restrooms, a currency exchange, and a booth selling memorabilia from the New York City government. There was an information booth below the auditorium's central light fixture, as well as 21 restored theater seats. The visitor center featured six internet terminals, which were installed as part of a collaboration with Yahoo!, There was a newsstand, four Fleet Bank ATMs, and ticket booths operated by the League of American Theatres and Producers, Metropolitan Transportation Authority, the New York City government, and Circle Line Sightseeing Cruises. The center also contained a display about Times Square's history, narrated by then-mayor Rudy Giuliani and television personality Dick Clark, as well as Winer's mural.

Subsequent additions to the visitor center included a concierge service for Broadway and off-Broadway shows, which opened in 2008. The visitor center was renovated in 2010. An exhibit about Times Square's old peep shows, a Times Square Ball, a photo booth, and a collection of hats used in Broadway shows were added to the visitor center during this time.

==== Retail conversion ====
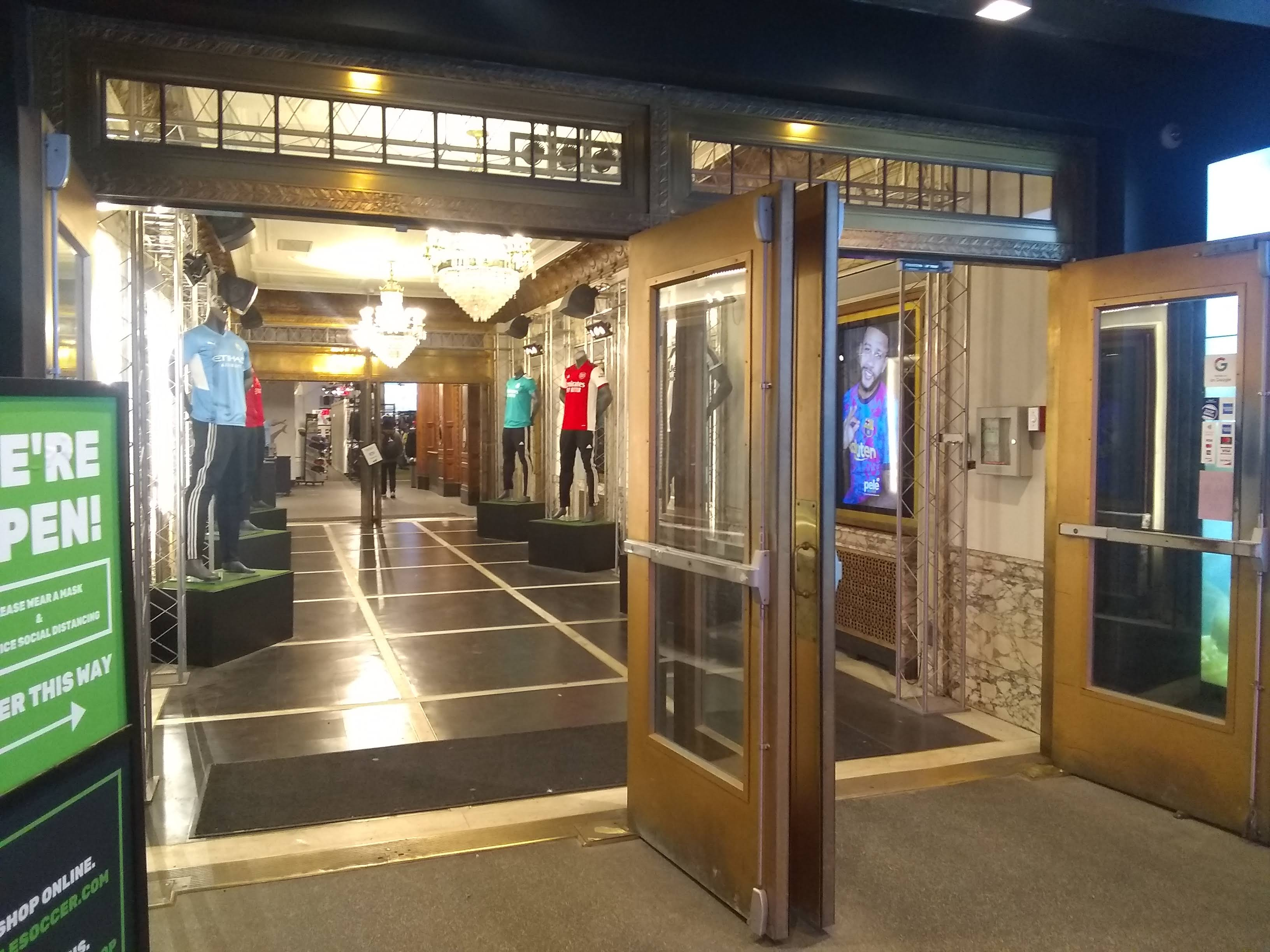
Entrance to the Pelé Soccer store, which uses the former theater space

In July 2013, the Actors Equity Building's owners proposed adding an escalator from the outer lobby to the basement, as well as relocating the inner lobby wall. Manhattan Community Board 5 opposed this plan. The owners subsequently made another proposal in October 2013, which involved modifying the basement escalators and leveling the raked auditorium floor; Community Board 5 also opposed this plan. The community board approved a third proposal made by Carlton Architects, who represented Brazilian soccer player Pelé, a prospective retail tenant for the space. Carlton proposed that the theater's layout be retained "to respect the space". The Times Square BID closed its information center in June 2014.

In November 2019, a Pelé Soccer store opened within the former Embassy Theatre space. Prior to the store's opening, the marquee above the theater's entrance was modified with the store's name. Television screens were installed in the theater's entrance vestibule, displaying soccer games, and the outer and inner lobbies were arranged with soccer memorabilia. The auditorium itself was used sell to soccer gear and footwear, and the auditorium floor was modified to look like a soccer field.

== See also ==
- List of New York City Designated Landmarks in Manhattan from 14th to 59th Streets
