= Indian News Parade =

- Indian News Parade title card
- Produced by: Information Films of India, Central Cine Corporation
- Country: India

Indian News Parade was a cinematic newsreel produced by the Indian government between September 1943 and April 1946. Originally a newsreel named Indian Movietone News from 1942 to 1943, it was produced in response to the Anglo-centric newsreels created by British and American companies. It suffered a poor critical reception, and production ceased shortly after the end of World War II.

== History ==
After a trip to Hollywood in 1940, film producer Ambalal Patel pitched the idea of a weekly Indian newsreel to the British Government in India. Indian Movietone News was subsequently established in September 1942 by Patel and Sir Edward Villiers. In an attempt to make the newsreels more accessible to the local population, Villiers intended to focus the content primarily on civil matters, a departure from other newsreels of the day which were heavily Eurocentric. Some of the other newsreels circulated in India at the time were British Movietone News, British Paramount News, United News and Gaumont British News, which all carried a distinct British or American bias, and although sometimes dubbed into local languages, were unpopular with the Indian population.

Whilst subsidised by the government, Indian Movietone News was originally intended to be independently produced and distributed. Early newsreels were produced by Twentieth Century Fox India, and were largely reissued versions of British Movietone newsreels dubbed into Indian languages. These were criticised by the Ministry of Information and Film India for their failure to address the country's social issue and the developing war in Europe, and were not widely circulated. In April 1943, the Indian government issued a directive under the Defence of India Act which required Indian cinemas to show Indian Movietone News (or other newsreels directly approved by the government) in an attempt to force it on an unwilling audience, a move which was heavily disapproved of. In order to better fulfil this directive, in 1943 Indian Movietone News was scrapped and replaced with the government-controlled Indian News Parade, now produced and distributed by Information Films of India.

The new newsreel ran throughout the Second World War, but in post-war India, its popularity waned amid accusations of political bias and irrelevance to modern life. In March 1946, the IFI's production budget was cut, and by the end of the month it was closed down. Indian News Parade was taken over by Ambalal Patel's Central Cine Corporation, but never escaped its reputation as a government propaganda tool, and production finally stopped in September 1946.

== Content ==
The early Indian Movietone News reels focussed heavily on war propaganda, and were short on political commentary. In spite of objections from the government, the show covered Mahatma Gandhi's release from the Aga Khan Palace in episode 62, showing that it retained at least some degree of independent editorial control. It was highly India-centric, compared to other newsreels at the time, but nonetheless still advocated cooperation with the forces of the British Empire and promoted colonialism. However, as independence for India approached, the newsreels began to widen their scope to include coverage of India's religious communities (episode 71), political parties (episode135) and international relations (episode 55), and started covering plans for post-war India (episodes 70, 71 and 88). During this period in the run-up to independence, Indian News Parade began to give prominence to Indian, rather than British, political figures (episodes 135, 160 and 163).

== Reception ==
Critical reception of Indian News Parade was largely negative. After the newsreel was made compulsory in cinemas in 1943, the Journal of the Film Industry commented that, "the notification of compulsion seems to be an admission by Government that the more interesting class of the public found the films [Indian Movietone News] uninteresting". Exhibitors, who were obliged to pay a rental fee in order to show the now-compulsory newsreel, complained that the practice "smacked more of totalitarianism than democracy". The obligatory screening of the jingoistic Indian News Parade articles was felt to be insensitive in poorer rural areas, particularly when episodes touched lightheartedly on issues which directly affected them (such as the Bengal famine). In spite of the newsreels intent to make the news accessible to the general Indian population, its colonial bias meant that it was largely out of touch with its intended audience.

The Indian press was strongly critical of Indian News Parade, citing its poor editing and lack of pace. The general cinema-going population were bored by repeated viewings; in a letter to the Ministry of Information, one European resident complained that "the scheme is getting on the cinema-going public's nerves and a considerable amount of harsh talk is ensuing, which to my mind, completely eliminates all the original propaganda value". In the light of growing Indian nationalism, the newsreels' most vocal critics were those who attacked its political affiliations, denouncing Indian News Parade as a tool of the British Raj and labelling it irrelevant to the domestic audience.

== Preservation and academic study ==
Copies of the Indian Movietone News and Indian News Parade are preserved in the film archive of the Imperial War Museum. In 2010, following an Arts and Humanities Research Council-funded collaborative project between IWM, the British Film Institute, the British Empire and Commonwealth Museum, and University College London and Birkbeck College, catalogue records for Indian News Parade issues, some enhanced with digitised film material and contextual and analytical essays, were published on the project website Colonial Film: Moving Images of the British Empire.

== See also ==
- List of newsreels by country
