= Haebang News =

1945–1947 South Korean newsreel

- 해방뉴스
- Genre: Newsreel
- Country of origin: United States Army Military Government in Korea
- Original language: Korean

Production
- Production company: Chosŏn Film Company

Original release
- Release: 1945 – 1947

Haebang News (Korean: 해방뉴스; Hanja: 解放뉴스; lit. Liberation News; alternately 해방뉴-쓰 or 해방뉴-스) was the first South Korean newsreel, which ran between 1945 and 1947. It consisted of 14 episodes (including several special episodes) that were around 9 minutes each. The series was produced by the Chosŏn Film Company, which also produced the Korean News newsreel.

As of 2023, copies of four of these episodes are known to exist. All four were produced in the second half of 1946. They were discovered in 2005, in the collection of the Kobe Planet Film Archive in Japan. They have since been digitized by the Korean Film Archive, and are freely available for viewing on the Korean Movie Database. A 1947 Japanese film, Go to Liberated Korea, contains some lost footage assumed to be from Haebang News, and was discovered in 2007.

== History ==
On August 16, when news first reached the general public of Korea's liberation from Japanese colonial rule, members of the Chosŏn Film Company quickly broke into a storage building that contained cameras and went to record the jubilant celebrations outside. One of their reporters was also in Pyongyang on August 24, and filmed the arrival of the Soviets and the beginning of their occupation of the North. A few weeks later, the United States Army Military Government in Korea (USAMGIK) began its occupation of the southern half of the peninsula. The company received permission on September 24 to began producing a news program. On October 21, they premiered two episodes of the program, alongside two special episodes. They fimed notable Korean politician Kim Ku's return to Korea in late November 1945.

Episodes could only be aired after passing the censors of the USAMGIK, and are thus considered by recent scholars to follow the official opinions of the military government.

=== Go to Liberated Korea ===
Content from several of Haebang News's early episodes, which are now considered lost, was recompiled into a 1947 documentary film called Go to Liberated Korea (解放朝鮮を行く; 해방 조선을 가다). The film was created by the People's FIlm Company and is currently held by the North Korea-aligned organization for Koreans in Japan, Chongryon. The film was rediscovered by researchers in the 2000s, and released by the South Korean National Archives to the general public on August 9, 2007.

== See also ==
- Korean Newsreel: a North Korean newsreel produced beginning in 1948
- Our Construction: the first North Korean film, also a newsreel, produced in July 1946
- Division of Korea
- Cinema of South Korea
- Mass media in South Korea
