= Korean Newsreel =

1948 North Korean news program

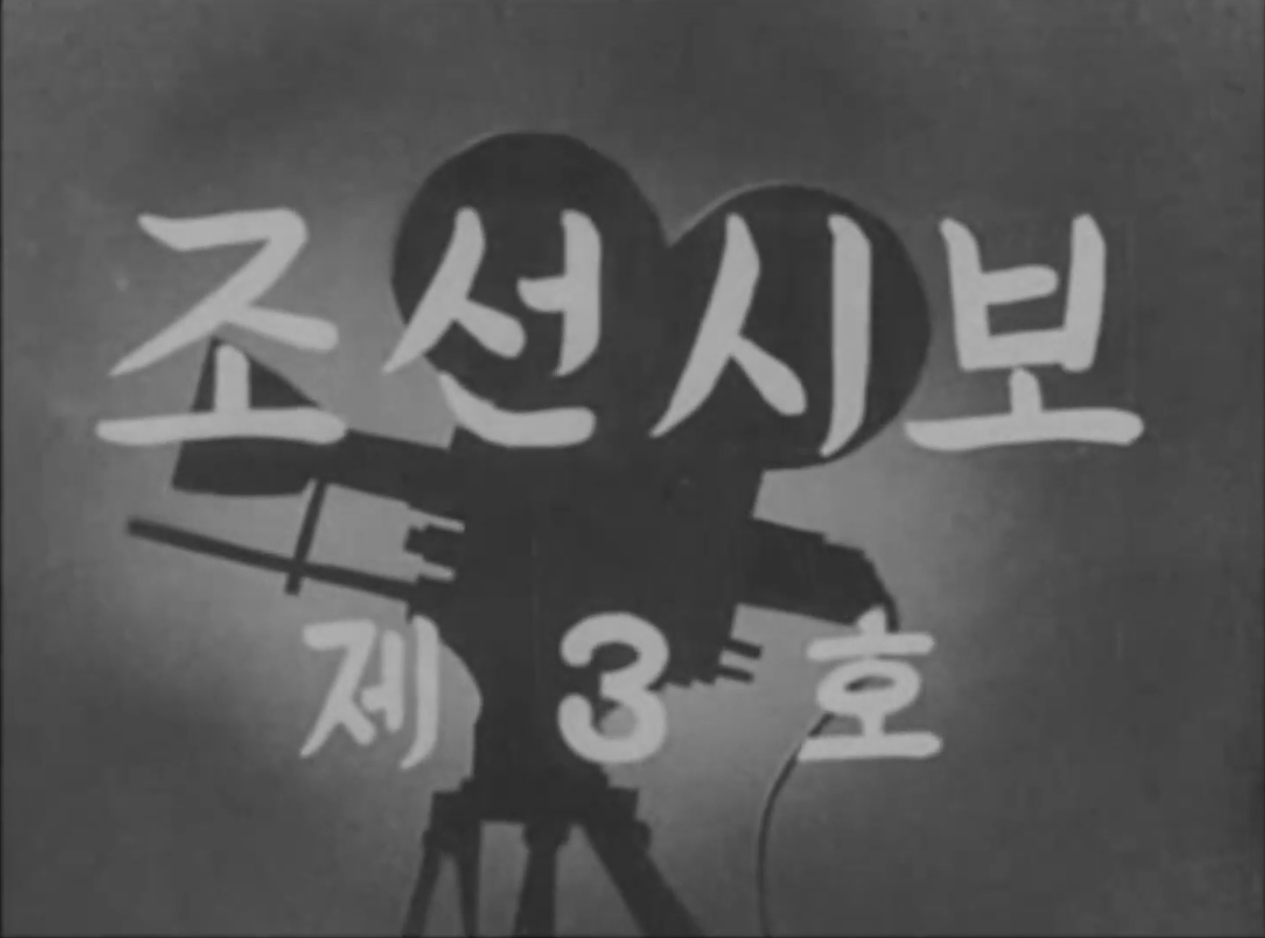
- Title card of the third episode (1948)
- 『조선시보』
- Country of origin: Soviet Civil Administration; People's Committee of North Korea
- Original language: Korean
- No. of episodes: 40–80 (disputed)

Production
- Production company: National Film Studio (1948–1957) Korean Documentary Film Studio (1957-unknown)

Original release
- Release: March 1948

Korean Newsreel (Korean: 조선시보; Hanja: 朝鮮時報) is a North Korean newsreel series that first premiered in March 1948. It was produced by the National Film Studio of North Korea (국립영화촬영소) until 1957, when the National Film Studio became the Korean Art Film Studio (조선예술영화촬영소) and a separate studio for producing documentaries and newsreels, the Korean Documentary Film Studio (조선기록영화촬영소), was established. Production of the series continued even during the 1950–1953 Korean War, with film reporters moving alongside North Korean troops during the fighting. Another newsreel was produced between 1950 and 1953 titled For The Reunification of the Fatherland (조국통일을 위하여). It is not known with certainty how many episodes of the series were created, with different sources citing 40, 70, and 80 episodes.

The first to fourth episodes were released some time in March 1948, and were shown to Kim Il Sung. The 21st episode was released in late 1949, and covers the unveiling of a statue of Kim Il Sung that occurred in Kangdong County on November 3 of that year, a welcome ceremony for a ship that arrived from the South, and the October celebration of the establishment of the new communist government of the People's Republic of China, after their victory in the Chinese Civil War. It also covers a few other current events throughout the North.

== See also ==
- Our Construction: the first North Korean film, newsreel released in July 1946
- Haebang News: the first South Korean newsreel, 1945–1947
