= Chungjeong Apartment =

Historic apartment in Seoul, South Korea

- 충정아파트
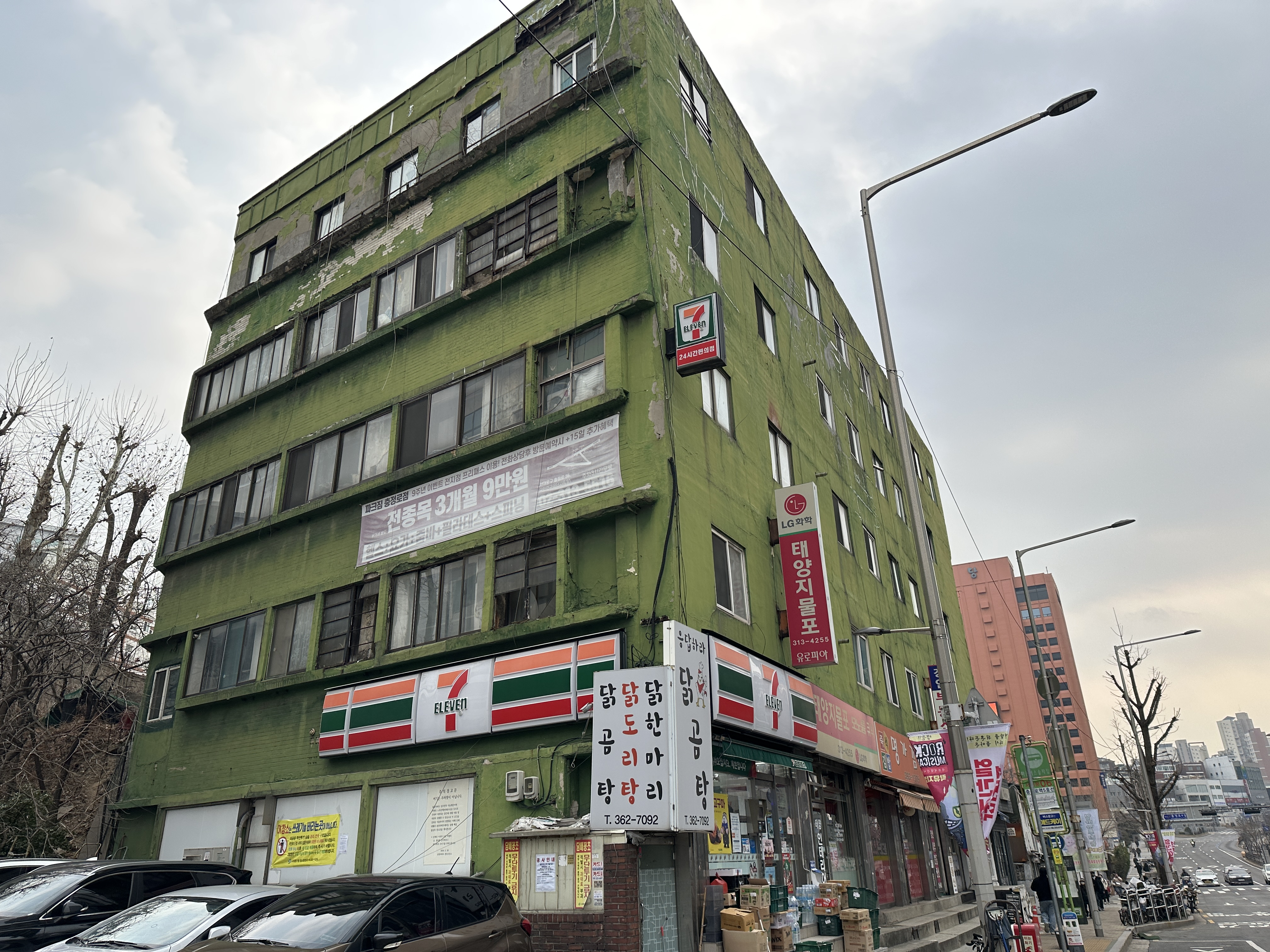
- Chungjeong Apartment (January 2025)
- Interactive map of the Chungjeong Apartment area
- Former names: Toyota Apartment; Korea Tourist Hotel; Yurim Apartment

General information
- Location: 30 Chungjeong-ro, Seodaemun District, Seoul, South Korea
- Coordinates: 37°33′42″N 126°57′51″E
- Completed: August 29, 1937; 88 years ago

Chungjeong Apartment (Korean: 충정아파트) is a historic residential apartment complex in Seodaemun District, Seoul, South Korea. Built in 1937 during the 1910–1945 Japanese colonial period, it was the first apartment complex in Korea to be built using reinforced concrete. In 2022, the Seoul Metropolitan Government announced its decision to have the building demolished.

It was once thought to be the first apartment complex to be constructed in Korea, but this is not true according to KBS, which claims that idea was based on an incorrect assumption that the building was completed in 1930.

== History ==
Construction began on the complex in 1932, and it was completed on August 29, 1937. It was originally nicknamed "Toyota Apartment", after its Japanese owner Toyota Tanematsu (豐田種松). It consisted of three connected buildings in a triangle formation, with four floors above ground and one below. There is an internal courtyard in the complex, and it has central heating. During the colonial period, the building had some Korean residents, including Hwang San-deok, who later became Minister of Justice of South Korea.

Upon the escalation of the Second Sino-Japanese War in the late 1930s, the Government-General of Chōsen set a price ceiling on rents. This negatively influenced apartment owners. Toyota Apartment received approval to be converted into a hotel in 1940. Business went poorly after the conversion. It then converted into a restaurant building that sold alcohol and oden.

Upon the liberation of Korea in 1945, the apartment was seized by the United States Army Military Government in Korea. It was renamed Traymore Hotel, and used as a dormitory for American soldiers. During the 1950–1953 Korean War, the buildings were used to house North Korean troops, United Nations troops, and the American Central Intelligence Agency (CIA). After the war, the Park Chung Hee government gave the building to Kim Byeong-jo (김병조), free of charge, because Kim claimed his six sons died while serving in the Korean War. (Note: This is attested to in an April 21, 1962 Korean News newsreel.) Kim renovated the interior, added an extra floor to the building, and renamed it Korea Tourist Hotel (코리아관광호텔). Soon afterwards, the government determined that Kim had lied and confiscated it from him. The building went up for auction in 1962, was converted back to an apartment building, and renamed "Yurim Apartment" (유림 아파트). It reportedly then changed owners a number of times. In 1978, amidst a road expansion project, around 8 m (26 ft) of the front of the building was demolished. Its original sloping roof was also removed. The complex has remained in much the same condition since. The complex received its current name in the 1980s; it was named after the adjacent street, Chungjeong-ro.

=== Preservation efforts and decision to demolish ===
In 2012, it was announced that efforts would be made to preserve the building as a historic landmark. In 2018, a safety analysis of the building gave it a D grade, and claimed that significant repairs and reinforcements urgently needed to be made. Locals opposed efforts to preserve the building due to concerns over its safety. In 2019, the Seoul Metropolitan Government proposed that the building could be repurposed as a cultural space, but this proposal was rejected. An August 2021 preservation proposal was also rejected.

On June 15, 2022, the Seoul Metropolitan Government announced that the building would be demolished. By this point, the complex was considered the oldest extant apartment building in South Korea. Plans were made for the building to be fully 3D scanned and documented before its demolition. It is to be replaced with a memorial hall to the building, as well as a new apartment building.
