= Ambalal Jhaverbhai Patel =

Indian photographer and film producer

Ambalal Jhaverbhai Patel (died 1961) was an Indian photographer and film producer.

Patel started working as a professional photographer in 1924. He subsequently started work as a cameraman in the newsreel industry, but continued photography as a hobby, and after a successful 1939 exhibition became a Fellow of the Royal Photographic Society. A trip to Hollywood the following year led to him pitching the idea of a weekly Indian newsreel to the British government in India, which eventually led to the creation of Indian News Parade. In 1952, he founded Film Centre, which was the first film laboratory in India to produce colour prints. In order to demonstrate Film Centre's capabilities, he produced Ezra Mir's film Pamposh, which received critical plaudits for its appearance.

Patel published the photography periodical Camera in the Tropics.
