= Canal 100 =

Newsreel logo

Canal 100 was a Brazilian newsreel created in 1959 by Carlos Niemeyer, known for its technical quality and coverage of topics such as sports, politics, and urban culture. With a cinematic language that was innovative for its time, the filmed periodical was shown in movie theaters before screenings and left its mark on generations by recording moments such as the construction of Brasília, music festivals, and the performances of the Brazilian national football team.

Its footage, often featuring unprecedented angles and slow motion, contributed to the international dissemination of the "beautiful game" image of Brazilian football. The Canal 100 collection, currently under the care of the Cinemateca Brasileira, is undergoing a restoration and digitization process scheduled for completion in 2026, according to project information.

== History ==
The history of Canal 100 began in 1957, when Carlos Niemeyer founded Líder Cinematográfica in Rio de Janeiro, which would later give rise to the newsreel. The format was inspired by newsreel models already used by Americans and Europeans, but the Brazilian production quickly developed its own identity by choosing football as its main content. In 1958, the team accompanied the Brazilian national team to the World Cup in Sweden, filming the first performances of Pelé and Garrincha.

The newsreel consolidated its characteristic language in the 1960s, a period in which it began to be shown weekly in movie theaters throughout Brazil before the main features. The coverage was not limited to sports: Canal 100's lenses documented the inauguration of Brasília, the awarding of the Palme d'Or to O Pagador de Promessas, the titles of boxer Éder Jofre, and also tragic events such as the floods in Rio de Janeiro and Brazil's early elimination from the 1966 World Cup.

Technical innovation was a central hallmark of the project. Carlos Niemeyer acquired 400 to 600 mm telephoto lenses, equipment superior to that available on television broadcasters at the time. The team of cinematographers, which included Francisco Torturra, Liercy de Oliveira, and João G. Rocha, positioned themselves at strategic points in Maracanã Stadium: two cameras in the moat behind the goals, one in the grandstand, and the sound technician in the bleachers. The use of slow motion allowed them to reveal details of plays and players' expressions that even those present in the stadium could not observe.

In the 1970s, the newsreel expanded its scope. It covered the conquest of the triple world championship in the 1970 World Cup in Mexico, the 1976 Olympic Games, and began to document more cultural events, such as performances by Carlos Santana, the band Genesis, and Brazilian music festivals. The famous soundtrack "Na Cadência do Samba (Que Bonito É)", composed by Luiz Bandeira in 1956 and performed by Waldir Calmon, became a trademark of the screenings. The period was also marked by the narration of Cid Moreira, the official announcer whose dramatic tone became memorable in coverage such as the 1966 elimination and the 1970 victory.

In the 1980s, Canal 100 documented the visit of Pope John Paul II to Rio de Janeiro, the Frank Sinatra concert in the city, the first edition of Rock in Rio, and the 1982 and 1986 World Cups. The inauguration of the Rio-Niterói Bridge, Pelé's farewell from Brazilian football, and the death of Juscelino Kubitschek were also recorded.

The newsreel ceased its activities in 1986, when the exhibition of short films before movie sessions was no longer mandatory. After Carlos Niemeyer's death in 1999, the collection was preserved by family members, and in 2001 Alexandre Niemeyer began a project to recover the material.

Currently, the Canal 100 collection, which contains approximately 21,793 news segments distributed across 8,044 35mm film canisters, is under the care of the Cinemateca Brasileira. Part of the material is also kept by the National Archives and is accessible to the public. Since 2011, the Cinemateca has been developing a project budgeted at R$ 22.7 million for the complete recovery, cataloging, and digitization of the collection, sponsored by the Vale Cultural Institute, Shell, and Itaú through the Cultural Incentive Law. The work is scheduled for completion in 2026, when a traveling exhibition of films about football featuring iconic excerpts from Canal 100 is planned.
