= Zodiac Fresco =

- Full view of fresco from left side of portico
- Artist: Frode Rambusch
- Year: 1913
- Medium: Fresco
- Location: Memorial Art Gallery, Rochester, NY

Zodiac Fresco is a fresco painted by Danish artist and decorator Frode Rambusch depicting the twelve astrological signs and embellished with Scandinavian motifs. It is located on the exterior portico of the Memorial Art Gallery in Rochester, New York. The work was commissioned for the 1913 opening of the gallery and was completed using German paints and limestone sourced from Denmark.

== Background ==
=== The artist ===
Frode Rambusch (1859–1924) was the son of a Lutheran pastor and expressed interest in Danish history and culture throughout his life. He emigrated to New York City from Denmark in 1889, where he had studied decoration and drawing at the Royal Danish Academy of Art in Copenhagen. Rambusch founded the Rambusch Decorating Company in 1898, which has endured as a leader in historical restoration and religious decoration.

=== Historical context ===
Rambusch’s choice of medium was part of a rediscovery of the fresco technique in Europe and America at the turn of the 19th Century and start of the 20th. Several contemporaries of Rambusch claimed to be leaders of the revival, including Max F. Friederang and Gardner Hale, who were both researching and applying plaster techniques in the beginning of the 20th century.

== Description ==
Zodiac Fresco (center panel): Artist: Frode Rambusch; Year: 1913; Medium: Fresco; Dimensions: (4 ft 8 in × 6 ft 5 in)

The fresco is composed of three arched panels, with the middle panel positioned directly above the original front entrance to the Memorial Art Gallery. A sun forms the focal point of the center panel, with a sixteen-point star in the middle, framed by two interlacing sets of rays, embellished with gold leaf. A subtle ray pattern emanates from behind the sun in shades of white and blue. Surrounding the sun is a cloud-like, wavy oval—representing the Milky Way—containing the twelve figures of the Western Zodiac. Painted in a toned gray to match the building’s limestone, each figure is set in a small gold frame against a dark navy sky. In the corners of the panel are decorative stripes, topped with gray clouds and gold accents.

Zodiac Fresco (left panel)

Flanking the center panel on either side are two narrower segments of the same dusky blue color. Nearly identical, they feature six rows of alternating blue and gold motifs. Each has a set of four petals clustered around a circular center and further bordered with small dots and gold leaf. The larger of the two motifs has an extra two sets of petals, while the simpler one is a bright teal.

The panels are framed by carved Indiana blue limestone, including a detailed semicircular bas-relief carving which crowns the doorway. In the center is a stylized image of the gallery itself, under which are intertwined the letters "MAG". This is encircled by laurels and topped with wings and an hourglass. To the left kneels a woman with a book and owl, Wisdom, and to the right, Memory kneels by her oil lamp. The wall below is bordered by frieze patterns which are reiterated in the fresco itself. A thin white strip containing a regular pattern of small, dark blue dots runs along the borders of the painting.

== Commission ==
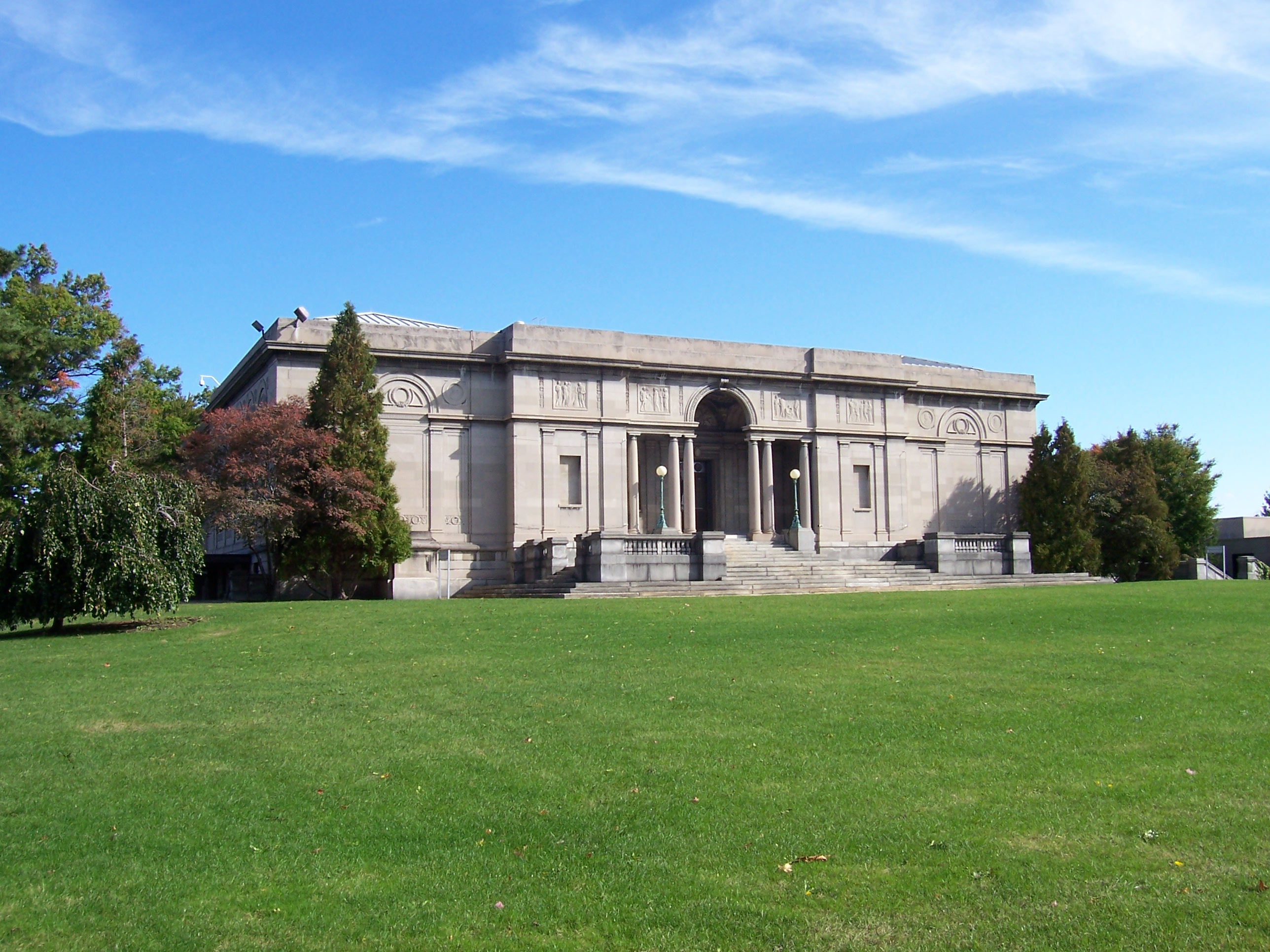
Memorial Art Gallery. Rochester, NY

Zodiac Fresco is characteristic of early Rambusch work. It was produced in conjunction with the construction of the Memorial Art Gallery by the architectural firm Foster, Gade, and Graham. Frode Rambusch was an acquaintance of John A. Gade, the lead architect of the Memorial Art Gallery and husband of Ruth Sibley, granddaughter of Hiram Sibley. Rambusch and Gade were both trustees of the American-Scandinavian Society in 1912, the year before the opening of the gallery.

=== Rochester Connection ===
The Rambusch Decorating Company was involved with several other projects in the Upstate New York region, including decoration of the Third Presbyterian Church in Rochester, NY, less than a mile away from the Memorial Art Gallery.

The Rambusch Decorating Company offices were located at the same address as the architecture firm of McKim, Mead, and White, which led the expansion of the galleries in 1926. McKim, Mead, and White were also involved with the construction of the Buckingham Building in Waterbury, CT in 1906, which housed a large fresco by Max F. Friederang. The firm was assistant architect to the Eastman Theater in Rochester, NY, another asset of the University of Rochester. Constructed in 1922, the theater is also in the Italian Renaissance style and features a remarkably similar design scheme with limestone, gold, blue, and a zodiac in relief on the ceiling.

=== Related works by the Rambusch Company in the Upstate Region ===
- Third Presbyterian Church, Rochester, NY
- St. Vincent de Paul, Albany, NY
- Cathedral of the Immaculate Conception, Syracuse, NY
- St. Louis Church, Pittsford, NY
