= News cinema =

Cinema specialising in short films, shown in a continuous manner

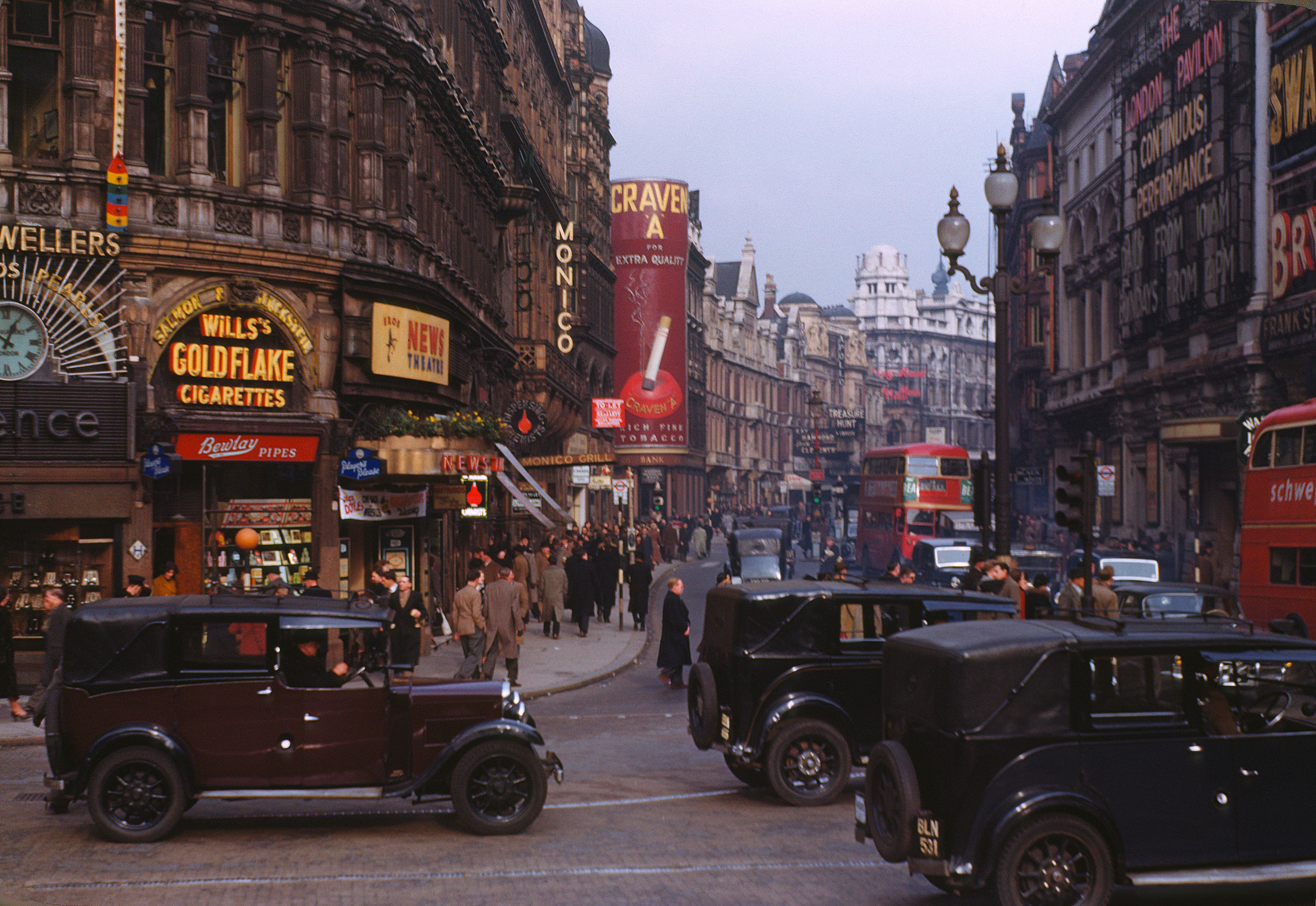
A view from Piccadilly Circus in 1949: on the left Eros News Theatre. On the right the London Pavilion has a "continuous performance".

A news cinema or newsreel theatre is a cinema specialising in short films, shown in a continuous manner. However, despite its name, a news cinema does not necessarily show only cinematographical news.

== History ==
The first official news cinema, The Daily Bioscope, opened in London on 23 May 1909.

"...at the corner of Bishopsgate and New Street (opposite the side entrance to Liverpool Street Railway Station). The Daily Bioscope was opened in a converted shop on 23rd May 1906 with Lubin Manufacturing Company's “The San Francisco Disaster”, Pathé Frères' “The Olympic Games at Athens” (Jeux Olympiques d'Athènes) and two short comedies. It had 100-seats and was operated by G.F. Silas on behalf of the Gaumont Company."

In 1929, the United States first dedicated news cinema was the Embassy Theatre on Broadway, New York City, which opened in 1925 as a first-run theater, before Loew's Inc. converted it into a news theater on 2 November 1929. However, because of competition with television news, it reverted into a first-run theater in 1949.

In 1933, Jack Diamond's Capitol and Provincial News Theatres (later renamed as Classic Cinemas) opened a News Theatre in London Victoria Station then, a News Theatre in London Waterloo station, in 1934, showing a continuous programme for travellers. Waterloo Station News Theatre was later a cartoon cinema, as Cartoon Cinema, later screening double bills of old "classic" films, as Classic Cinema Waterloo. Victoria Station News Theatre was later a cartoon cinema, as Cartoon Cinema. Victoria Station News Theatre, Waterloo Station News Theatre, and Cameo News Theatre Victoria were designed by Alister MacDonald, son of Prime Minister Ramsay MacDonald. Victoria Station News Theatre was in operation from 1933 until being demolished in 1981.

In England in 1951, however, when Seebohm Rowntree published his study on English Life and Leisure, he counted "approximately 20 news cinemas in London", and "very few [...] in the provinces, probably not more than a dozen in all". According to Rowntree, a population of at least 300,000 was needed in a town for a news cinema to be sustainable.

== Shows ==
The original programmes of news cinemas featured mainly of newsreels, possibly with a short subject or travelogue. Afterward, newsreels came to occupy a shorter length of the programme, replaced by other, more entertaining elements. Programs typically lasted one hour, and were shown continuously, without any interval between performances.

Actor Peter O'Toole, who grew up in Leeds in the 1930s, reported in an interview with Roger Ebert that his father often took him to a nearby news cinema. When he was six, in 1938, he saw in that news cinema a program including the Three Stooges, Donald Duck, the Ritz Brothers, and news footage, including footage of Benito Mussolini and Adolf Hitler.

Seebohm Rowntree, in 1951, similarly reports that "the news films occupy only a comparatively small part of the programme, largely because public interest in news films has declined". According to him, they have been replaced with cartoons, travelogues, or films on such general subjects as sports, fashion, or domestic economy.

== See also ==
- Short subject
- Grindhouse
