= Korean News =

1953–1994 South Korean government newsreel

- Hangul: 대한뉴스
- RR: Daehannyuseu
- MR: Taehannyusŭ
- Country of origin: South Korea
- Original language: Korean

Original release
- Release: January 1953 – December 31, 1994

Related
- Korea TV

Korean News (Korean: 대한뉴스) was a South Korean government news program that was displayed in movie theaters between 1953 and 1994. Its 2040th program, which aired on December 31, 1994, was its last one.

The program went by a number of names over its history. A predecessor to this program, Korean Newsreel (조선시보; 朝鮮時報), ran between 1945 and 1948. Another predecessor, the Korea Forward News (대한전진보; 大韓前進報), ran between 1948 and 1953. The program was created as Korean News (대한뉴-스 [sic]) in 1953, although it went on to use several alternate transliterations of the word "news" over the years (대한늬우스, 대한뉴우스, and finally 대한뉴스). For several months in 1980, it went by the name Camera Report (카메라순보). It also produced a program for Koreans in Japan first under a similar title (한국소식; 韓國消息; lit. 'Happenings in Korea') and then as Homeland News (고국소식; 故國消息).

Its role as a government news program was then assumed by cable TV channel Korea TV (KTV). A private newspaper under the same name was founded in 2003, with the intention of succeeding the role of the previous news program.

All episodes are available for viewing, free of charge, on the government-sponsored eHistory film archive website and on KTV's YouTube channel.

== History ==
The program, its predecessors, and successors have their origins in a film company established in 1942, during the 1910–1945 Japanese colonial period. The company was called the Chōsen Film Company (朝鮮映畵社; 조선영화사). After Korea was liberated in 1945, the company began to produce the Korean Newsreel (조선시보; 朝鮮時報) under the United States Army Military Government in Korea. On November 4, 1948, shortly after the United States handed off authority to the First Republic of Korea, the Bureau of Public Information of the South Korean government took over production of the films, and renamed the series to Korea Forward News (대한전진보; 大韓前進報). Black-and-white films were released monthly during this period.

During the 1950–1953 Korean War, Busan served as the provisional capital of the South, and the films were produced and aired there. In January 1953, the program was renamed to roughly its current form: Korean News (대한뉴-스 [sic]). Two to three times a month, 16 mm films were produced and displayed on mobile projectors for the army and populus, although mainly in Busan. On November 25, 1953, after the Korean Armistice Agreement marking the de facto end of the war, the program's Hangul title was transliterated slightly differently (대한늬우스).

It aired its 100th episode on January 17 of that year. In December, the films were produced and shown weekly in locations across the country on 35 mm and 16 mm film. From 1961, it went by another transliteration (대한뉴우스). It began producing some episodes in color beginning in November 1963. On December 26, 1964, it released its 500th episode. It began using 8 mm film in 1970. Beginning in August 1972, all episodes were released in color. By 1974, every city, county, town, and village had access to the films. It changed the transliteration to its final form (대한뉴스) in 1978, although between March 15 and May 30 of 1980 it went by the name Camera Report (카메라순보) before changing back.

According to the Encyclopedia of Korean Culture, by the 1980s, it was seen as one-sided government propaganda, and generally dismissed. It decreased in relevance with the rise of mass media in South Korea around that time. The last episode, No. 2040, aired on December 31, 1994. It was succeeded by Korea TV (K-TV or KTV) in March 1995. A private newspaper by the same name was also founded on October 24, 2003, with the intention of succeeding the news program.

=== Overseas editions ===
From February 1962, an additional monthly news program was produced specifically for Koreans in Japan. Its title can also be translated as Korean News, although it had a distinct title in Korean (한국소식; 韓國消息). Beginning with its January 23, 1970 episode, the program began to use the name Homeland News (고국소식; 故國消息).

From 1967, it produced films in five languages for Koreans overseas.

== See also ==
- Haebang News: another South Korean newsreel, 1945–1947
- Our Construction: first North Korean film, a newsreel from July 1946
- Mass media in South Korea
