= Rambusch Decorating Company =

The Rambusch Decorating Company was founded in 1898 in New York, New York, by Frode Rambusch, a Danish immigrant. It is based in Jersey City, New Jersey.

In the 1920s, Rambusch was the decorator for many elaborate movie palaces, including the Roxy Theatre in New York City, which seated 6,214 and opened in March 1927. That project was supervised by Harold Rambusch, working with architect Walter W. Ahlschlager. It also designed the interior of the Mark Hellinger Theatre, which was built in 1930 as a movie house but was later converted to a Broadway theatre. The firm helped decorate the main public rooms at the Waldorf-Astoria hotel when it was built in the early 1930s. It also helped make some of the stained glass windows at St. Bartholomew's Church on Park Avenue. The firm also employed later generations of Rambusches, including Viggo F. E. Rambusch.

During World War II, the firm helped camouflage American airfields from enemy planes. Sketches of orchards and farm buildings were painted on the airfields to confuse the enemy.

== Notable Projects ==
=== Lighting ===
- Beacon Towers, Jersey City, NJ
- Citibank Chandelier, New York, NY
- Hermitage, Historical, Nashville, TN
- Adam Plaza Bank, College Station, TX
- St. Joseph's Church, New Orleans, LA
- Hamilton Hotel Marcel Breuer Chandelier, Baltimore, MD
- St. Francis de Sales, Muskegon, MI
- Utah State Capital. Salt Lake City, UT
- Taft School, Watertown, CT
- Yale Art Gallery Historic, New Haven, CT
- Empire State Building Lobby – New York City
- Pritzker Library, Chicago, IL
- Winnipeg Airport, Winnipeg, Canada
- St. Mary's Church, Wichita, KS
- Maryland State House Historic, Annapolis, MD
- St. Steven's Episcopal Church, Durham, NH
- Frick Museum, New York, NY
- United Nations Fixture Renovations, New York, NY
- Penn State Auditorium, Happy Valley, PA
- St. Matthew's Catholic Church, Washington, DC
- St. Mary's Church, New Haven, CT
- Metropolitan Cathedral of Medellín, Colombia

=== Stained Glass Work ===
- St. Gregory's, Hamilton Square, NJ
- St. Bernadette's, Port St. Lucie, FL
- St. Paul's Riverside, Jacksonville, FL
- St. John the Baptist, Draper, UT
- St. Francis Hospital, Phoenix, AZ
- Broadhurst, 57th Street, New York, NY ??
- Seton Hall Seminary Chapel, South Orange, NJ
- Assumption Greek Orthodox, Fairview, NJ
- St. Louis Church, Penfield, NY
- Our Lady of Lourdes, Wellfleet, MA
- St. Stephen's Episcopal Church, Durham, NC
- All Saints Church, Harrison, NY

=== Church Interiors & Craft Projects ===
- St. Raymond's Church, Bronx, NY
- Italian Chapel, National Shrine, Washington, DC
- St. Joseph Cathedral, Wheeling, WV
- Christ Church, Short Hills, NJ
- St. Mary Cathedral, Lafayette, IN
- St. Andrews Church, Rochester, NY
- Fireman's Memorial, Ground Zero, New York, NY
- 60’ Diameter mosaics, National Shrine, Washington, DC
- Holy Cross, DeWitt, NY
- St. George Church, St. George, UT
- St. James Church, Charlestown, VA
- St. Joseph's Church, Biddeford, ME
- St. Margaret Mary Church, Omaha, NE
- St. Peter Church Point Pleasant Beach NJ
- St. Nicholas of Tolentine Church, Bronx, NY
- First Lutheran Church, Norfolk, VA

=== Secular ===
- Memorial Art Gallery Fresco, Rochester, NY
- NYC Firefighter's 9/11 Memorial – 56’ Bronze Bas relief, 2004
- 1896 replica Bronze Orbs surrounding 18 story building, 2014
