= Arthur Crisp =

Canadian artist (1881-1974)

- Born: Arthur Watkins Crisp; April 26, 1881; Hamilton, Ontario
- Died: June 28, 1974 (aged 93); Biddeford Pool, Maine
- Education: Hamilton Art School (1898-1900) with John Sloan Gordon; Art Students League, New York (1900-1902) with Frank Vincent Dumond
- Spouse: Mary Ellen Crisp
- Awards: bronze medal at the Pan-Pacific Exhibition in San Francisco (1915); the Halgarten Prize at the National Academy of Design exhibition in New York (1916)
- Elected: elected full member, National Academy of Design (1937)

Arthur Watkins Crisp (26 April 1881, Hamilton, Ontario – 28 June 1974, Biddeford Pool, Maine) was a Canadian painter, muralist, and designer.

== Career ==
By 1898, Crisp was attending the Hamilton Art School, studying with the artist and teacher John Sloan Gordon. He remained there for three years. During this time, he also worked as an engraver at the Hamilton Herald.

He left Hamilton for New York City in the summer of 1900 to attend the Art Students League and worked there three years, valuing especially Frank DuMond as a teacher. He worked afterwards as a commercial artist, and as a painter and a muralist. From 1913 to 1917, he was appointed a drawing instructor at Cooper Union. He then went on to teach at the Beaux-Arts Institute of Design of New York, as well as the Art Students League. He won a bronze medal at the Pan-Pacific Exhibition in San Francisco in 1915, and the Halgarten Prize at the National Academy of Design exhibition in New York in 1916.

He was commissioned to paint British and Canadian recruiting on the Boston Common in 1918 for the Canadian War Memorials and painted decorations for the Reading Room of the new House of Commons in Ottawa (1920–1923), for the Imperial Bank of Commerce, King St, Toronto (1930), for the Capitol Building, Columbus, Ohio (1951) and for the State Educational Building, Albany, New York (1959). His paintings are in the Art Gallery of Hamilton, the Morgan Library, New York, the National Gallery of Canada, Ottawa, the National Portrait Gallery, USA, and the Whitney Museum of American Art, New York.

Crisp was a member of the New York Architectural League (1911), and the National Society of Mural Painters (1914). He was a founder-member of the Allied Artists of America (1914), and also belonged to the American Water Color Society and the New York Water Color Club (1915). He was elected a full academician of the National Academy of Design (1937) as well as exhibiting widely.

He retired to Biddeford, Maine, in 1956 and gave a large collection of his work to the Art Gallery of Hamilton in 1963, which celebrated the occasion with a major retrospective exhibition for Arthur Crisp and his wife. Arthur Crisp died in Maine in 1974, aged 93.

The Arthur Crisp Papers (1952–1963) are in the Special Collections Research Center, Syracuse University Libraries, Syracuse, NY (13244-2010).
