= Won of the Red Army Command =

1945–1947 currency in North Korea

붉은 군대 사령부의 원
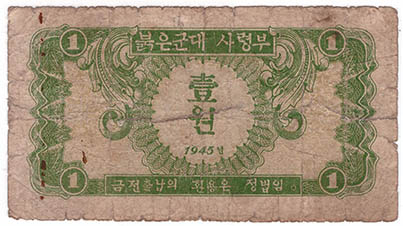
1 won - front
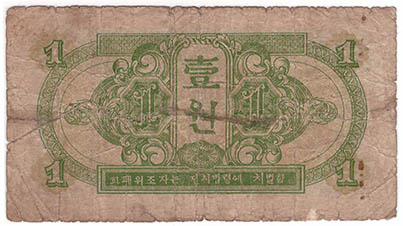
1 won - back

Denominations
- Banknotes: 1, 5, 10, 100 won
- Coins: Not issued

Demographics
- Date of introduction: 3 September 1945
- Date of withdrawal: 6 December 1947
- Replaced by: North Korean won
- User(s): (Soviet Union) Korea under Soviet control North Korea

Issuance
- Central bank: Command of the Red Army in Korea
- This infobox shows the latest status before this currency was rendered obsolete.

Won of the Red Army Command (Korean: 붉은 군대 사령부의 원; MR: Pulgŭn kundae saryŏngbuŭi wŏn; Russian: Вона Командования Красной армии, romanized: Vona Komandovaniya Krasnoy armii) were banknotes issued by the Soviet military command in North Korea and circulated from 1945 to 1947 in parallel with the Korean yen, and then with the DPRK won.

== History ==
After liberation from Japanese forces, Korea was divided into two zones under the control of the American and Soviet military commanders. The zone dividing line ran along the 38th parallel. In circulation in both zones, the Korean yen continued to be used, the issue of which was made by the Bank of Joseon, located in the American zone of occupation, which did not give the Soviet military command the opportunity to use the issue of the bank to cover the costs of maintaining troops. In October 1945, 1, 5, 10 and 100 won banknotes were issued on behalf of the Red Army Command. The banknotes bear the date "1945" and the text is in Korean. The issue of banknotes was mainly limited to the locations of Soviet military units.

In December 1947, a monetary reform was carried out in North Korea, and the North Korean won was introduced instead of the Korean yen. The Won of the Red Army Command was not withdrawn from circulation during the reform, but its further release was discontinued.

== List of banknotes ==
Вона Командования Красной армии 붉은 군대 사령부의 원 Won of the Red Army Command
Picture	Value	Colour	Size
	1	green	124х67 mm
	5	brown	134х77 mm
	10	violet	156х83 mm
	100	pink	168х94 mm

== See also ==
- Yuan of the Red Army Command
- Manchukuo yuan
- Tuvan akşa

== Bibliography ==
- Сенилов, Б.В. (1991). Военные деньги Второй мировой войны. М.: Финансы и статистика. p. 123.
- Cuhaj, G.S. (2008). Standard Catalog of World Paper Money. General Issues 1368—1960 (12-е изд ed.). Iola: Krause Publications. p. 1223. ISBN 978-0-89689-730-4.
