= Our Construction =

1946 first North Korean film

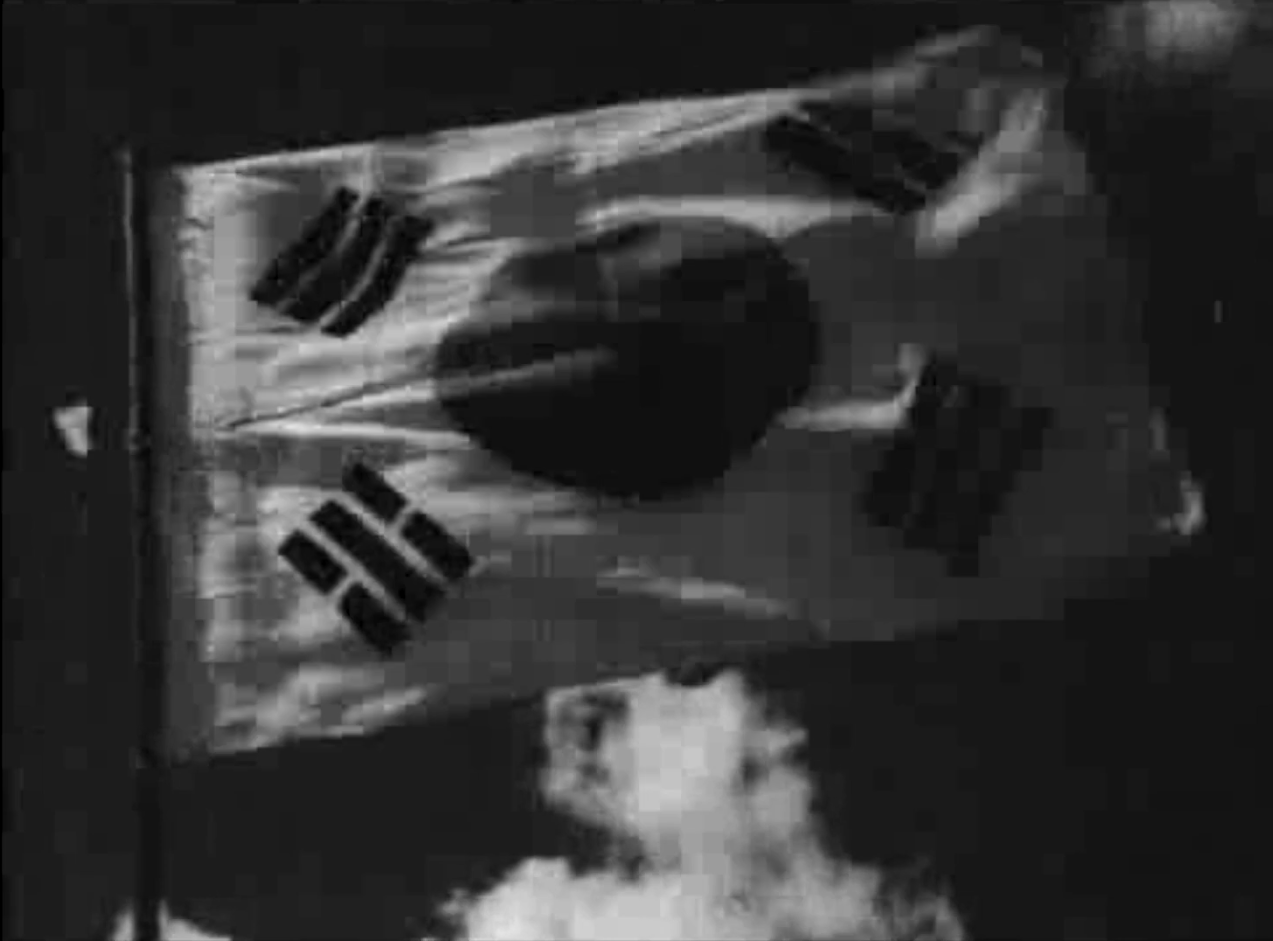
- Still from the film. Shows the Flag of the Provisional People's Committee for North Korea, which is extremely similar to the current Flag of South Korea.
- Hangul: 우리의 건설
- Hanja: 우리의 建設
- RR: Uriui geonseol
- MR: Uriŭi kŏnsŏl
- Color process: Black-and-white
- Release date: 1 July 1946
- Country: North Korea
- Language: Korean
- Budget: 100,000 won

Our Construction (Korean: 우리의 건설) is a 1946 North Korean documentary. It is widely considered to be the first North Korean film, and predates the 1949 My Home Village, which was the first feature film in the country. It is a silent and black-and-white film.

It was filmed with a single camera and consists of three parts that each cover an event from the first half of 1946. The first part commemorates the 27th anniversary of the March First Movement, the second part covers International Workers' Day celebrations on 1 May, and the third covers repairs to infrastructure of the Pothong River in Pyongyang.

== Contents ==
The film is silent and black-and-white, and consists of three parts. The first part focuses on the 1946 anniversary celebration of the March First Movement, and shows citizens marching with banners that read, "Land for the farmers who till its soil" (『토지는 밭갈이 하는 농민에게』). The second part focuses on 1 May International Workers' Day celebrations, and shows peasants rejoicing at land redistribution programs and marching together. The third part focuses on repairs to flood-prevention infrastructure of the Pothong River in Pyongyang. It shows a groundbreaking ceremony, in which Kim Il Sung shovels the first clump of dirt.

== Production ==
=== Context ===
Between 1910 and 1945, Korea was a colony of the Empire of Japan. In 1919, protests against Japanese rule were held throughout Korea, in what became known as the March 1st Movement. The protests were brutally suppressed by the Japanese, resulting in thousands of deaths, and were ultimately unsuccessful in the short term. However, the Movement became a catalyst and symbol for the Korean independence movement.

After the end of World War II in 1945, Kim Il Sung became leader of the Soviet-backed Provisional People's Committee of North Korea in February 1946. Shortly afterwards, the North Korean government encouraged the creation of films that forwarded ideas of anti-imperialism, anti-feudalism, and democracy. They also wanted the films to focus on working-class people, such as factory workers and peasants.

=== Creation ===
According to recent articles by the North Korean government-supported DPRK Today and Kim Il Sung University, in February 1946, Kim Il Sung tasked a worker with creating the film.

According to an interview in the South Korean Monthly Chosun with Jeong Chu (정추; 鄭樞), Jeong's eldest brother Jeong Jun-chae (정준채) went to North Korea from Seoul with a single German camera in February 1946, planning to film celebrations of the March 1st Movement, International Women's Day (8 March), and International Workers' Day (1 May). He started a film studio in a former sock factory in the Taedong County area of Pyongyang, and requested support for his work from Kim Chang-man (김창만), the head of propaganda for the Workers' Party of North Korea. Jeong received that support and also approval from Kim Il Sung. Jeong Jun-chae then played a pivotal role in the creation of some of North Korea's earliest films, including Our Construction.

The film was created by the film department of the Workers' Party, which was the predecessor to the 1947 Korean Art Film Studio and the Korean Documentary Science Studio. The department initially had only around five members and a single camera, making the task difficult. They created the film with that camera and a departmental budget of 100,000 won. The film was originally planned and shot as three independent films, but under the instruction of Kim Il Sung, the three films were merged into one.

== Release ==
According to a 2019 DPRK Today article and Kim Il Sung University, the film was released in late July 1946. According to another DPRK Today article from 2018 and the South Korean researcher Lee Chun-gil, the film was released on 1 July 1946, the same day that the Korean Documentary Studio later set as its founding date.

According to the DPRK Today, Kim Il Sung himself attended the first screening. The public was reportedly greatly interested in the film, despite it being silent.
