= Newsreel =

Form of short documentary film, containing news stories

"Showdown in Vietnam", a February 8, 1965, war propaganda newsreel by Universal Newsreel, with narration by Ed Herlihy.

A newsreel is a form of short documentary film, containing news stories and items of topical interest, that was prevalent between the 1910s and the late 1960s. Typically presented in a cinema, newsreels were a source of current affairs, information, and entertainment for millions of moviegoers. Newsreels were typically exhibited preceding a feature film, but there were also dedicated newsreel theaters in many major cities in the 1930s and ’40s, and some large city cinemas also included a smaller theaterette where newsreels were screened continuously throughout the day.

By the end of the 1960s television news broadcasts had supplanted the format. Newsreels are considered significant historical documents, since they are often the only audiovisual record of certain cultural events.

== History ==
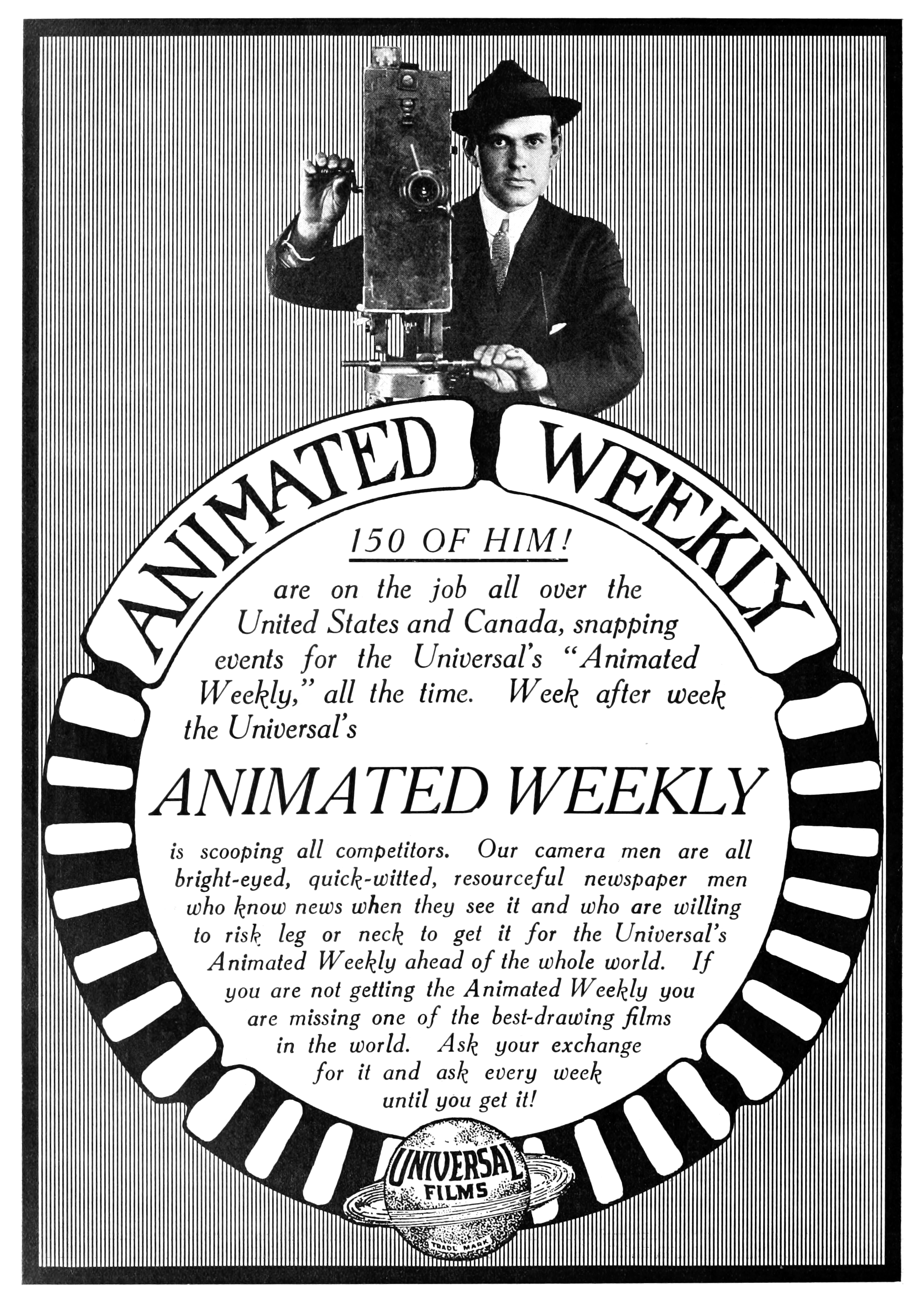
Trade advertisement for the Universal Animated Weekly, a newsreel series created by Universal Pictures in 1913

1931 Pathé newsreel of Mahatma Gandhi arriving in London.

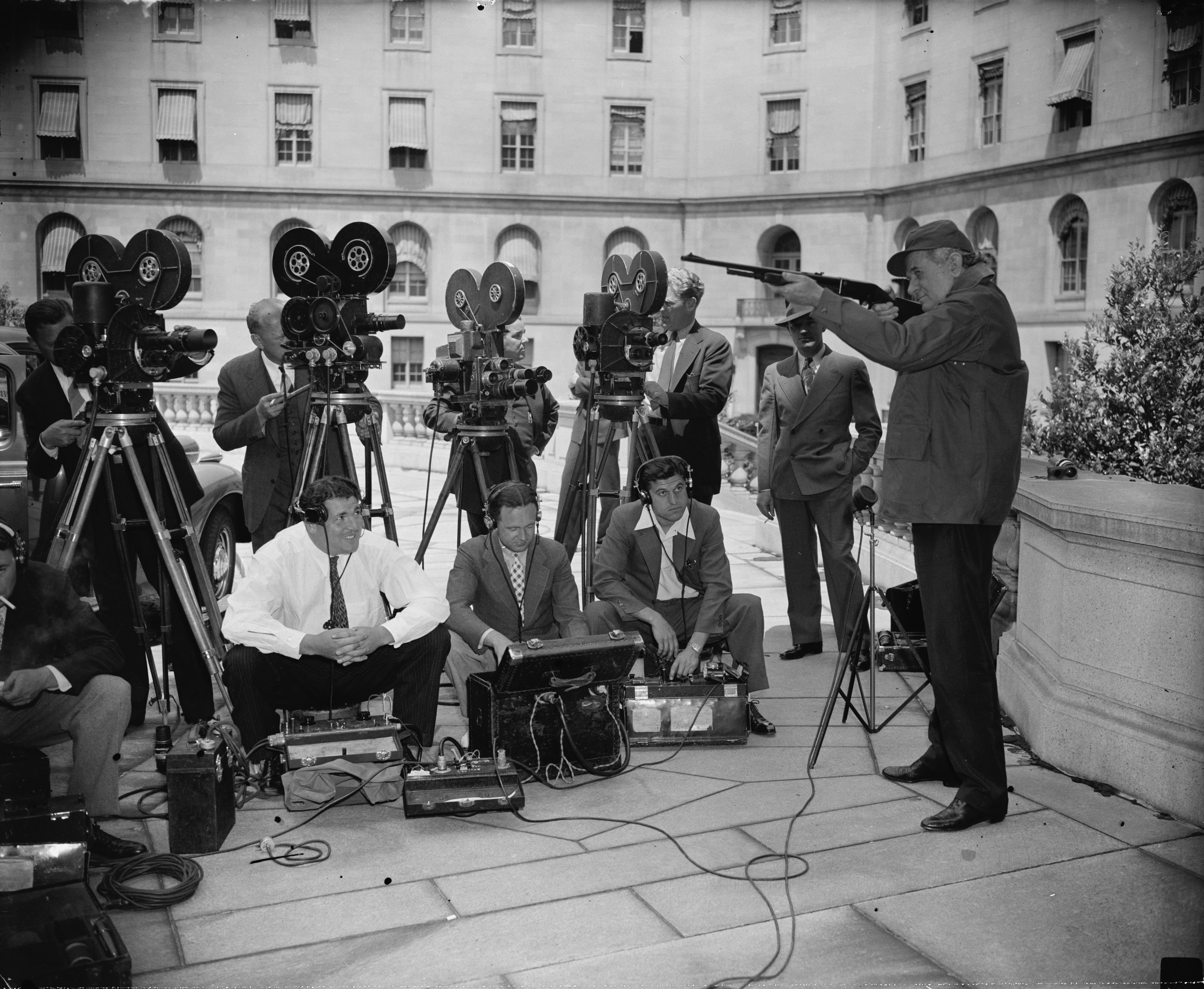
News cameramen, Washington, D.C., 1938

January 31, 1946 report on Fort Monmouth army engineers sending a radar signal to the moon.

Silent news films were shown in cinemas from the late 19th century. In 1909 Pathé started producing weekly newsreels in Europe. Pathé began producing newsreels for the UK in 1910 and the US in 1911.

Newsreels were a staple of the typical North American, British, and Commonwealth countries (especially Canada, Australia, and New Zealand), and throughout European cinema programming schedule from the silent era until the 1960s when television news broadcasting completely supplanted its role. The National Film and Sound Archive in Australia holds the Cinesound Movietone Australian Newsreel Collection, a comprehensive collection of 4,000 newsreel films and documentaries representing news stories covering all major events.

The first official British news cinema that only showed newsreels was the Daily Bioscope that opened in London on May 23, 1909. In 1929, William Fox purchased a former cinema called the Embassy. He changed the format from a $2 show twice a day to a continuous 25-cent programme, establishing the first newsreel theater in the United States; the idea was such a success that Fox and his backers announced they would start a chain of newsreel theaters across the country. (Note: The six or seven minutes of newsreel exhibited in ordinary program houses are selected from many reels of current events. Nowhere could one be sure of seeing all the newsreels made in any one week. In Manhattan, William Fox, in collaboration with Hearst Metro tone, found what to do with the newsreels discarded weekly by their companies. He took over a Broadway theater (Embassy) and changed its program from a $2 show twice a day to a continuous 25¢ show. He made the program all newsreels, to run for an hour, a full photographic report of the pictorial parts of the week's news.) The newsreels were often accompanied by cartoons or short subjects.

The First World War saw the major countries using the newest technologies to develop propaganda for home audiences. Each used carefully edited newsreels to combine straight news reports and propaganda. During the Second World War, the Reich Ministry of Public Enlightenment and Propaganda, a state organization in Nazi Germany for disseminating stories favorable to the administration's goals, created Die Deutsche Wochenschau (1940–1945). There were no other newsreels disseminated within the country during the war.

Documentary on the official American film cameramen in World War I

In some countries, newsreels generally used music as a background for usually silent on-site film footage. In some countries, the narrator used humorous remarks for light-hearted or non-tragic stories. In the U.S., newsreel series included The March of Time (1935–1951), Pathé News (1910–1956), Paramount News (1927–1957), Fox Movietone News (1928–1963), Hearst Metrotone News (1914–1967), and Universal Newsreel (1929–1967). Pathé News was distributed by RKO Radio Pictures from 1931 to 1947, and then by Warner Brothers from 1947 to 1956.

An example of a newsreel story can be found in the film Citizen Kane (1941), which was prepared by RKO's actual newsreel staff. Citizen Kane includes a fictional newsreel called "News on the March" that summarizes the life of title character Charles Foster Kane while parodying The March of Time.

On August 12, 1949, one hundred twenty cinema technicians employed by Associated British Pathé in London went on strike to protest the dismissal of fifteen men on the grounds of redundancy while conciliation under trade union agreements was pending. Their strike lasted through to at least Tuesday August 16, the Tuesday being the last day for production on new newsreels shown on the Thursday. Events of the strike resulted in over three hundred cinemas across Britain having to go without newsreels that week.

== Television news ==
In 1936, when the BBC Television Service was launched in the United Kingdom, it was airing the British Movietone and Gaumont British newsreels for several years (except for a break during World War II), until 1948, when the service launched their own newsreel programme, titled Television Newsreel, that would last until July 1954, when it was replaced by News and Newsreel.

On February 16, 1948, NBC launched a ten-minute television program called Camel Newsreel Theatre with John Cameron Swayze that featured newsreels with Swayze doing voiceovers. Also in 1948, the DuMont Television Network launched two short-lived newsreel series, Camera Headlines and I.N.S. Telenews, the latter in cooperation with Hearst's International News Service.

On August 15, 1948, CBS started their evening television news program Douglas Edwards and the News. Later the NBC, CBS, and ABC (USA) news shows all produced their own news film.

In New Zealand, the Weekly Review was "the principal film series produced in the 1940s". The first television news broadcasts in the country, incorporating newsreel footage, began in 1960.

== Demise ==
Newsreel-producing companies excluded television companies from their distribution, but the television companies countered by sending their own camera crews to film news events.

Newsreels died out because of the nightly television news broadcast, and technological advances such as electronic news-gathering for television news, introduced in the 1970s, rendered them obsolete.

Newsreel cinemas either closed or went to showing continuous programmes of cartoons and short subjects, such as the London Victoria Station News Cinema, later Cartoon Cinema that opened in 1933 and closed in 1981.

The last American newsreel was released on December 26, 1967, the day after Christmas. Nonetheless, some countries such as Cuba, Japan, Spain, and Italy continued producing newsreels into the 1980s and 1990s.

== British newsreels ==
The first British newsreel was Pathé Animated Gazette (June 1910 – 1970). Other British newsreels include:

- Gaumont Graphic (1910–1932)
- Warwick Bioscope Chronicle
- Topical Budget
- Empire News Bulletin (1926–1930)
- British Movietone News ( -May 1979)
- British Paramount (1931–1957)
- Gaumont British (1934–1959)
- Visnews (1957–1984)

== Retrospectives ==
An Australian movie production dramatizing the camera operators and producers of newsreels was released in 1978. The title was Newsfront. Some events featured during the presentation were regarding the 1949 election of the Australian Prime Minister, the rabbit plague, and the introduction of television (1956).

A 2016 Irish documentary, Éire na Nuachtscannán ("Ireland in the Newsreels") looked at the newsreel age in Ireland, mostly focusing on Pathé News and how the (British) company altered its newsreels for an Irish audience.

== See also ==
- List of newsreels by country
- The March of Time newsreel series produced by Time-Life from 1935 to 1951
- Universal Newsreel newsreel series produced by Universal Studios from 1929 to 1967
- Hearst Metrotone News newsreel series produced by Hearst Corporation from 1914 to 1967 (distributed by Fox Film Corporation 1929–1934 and by MGM 1934–1967)
- Fox Movietone News produced by Fox 1928 to 1963
- Paramount News newsreel series produced by Paramount Pictures from 1927 to 1957
- Pathé News newsreel series produced by Pathé Film from 1910 to 1956 (distributed by RKO Radio Pictures 1931–1947 and by Warner Brothers 1947–1956)

== Bibliography ==
- Fielding, R. (2015). The American Newsreel: A Complete History, 1911-1967, 2d ed. McFarland, Incorporated, Publishers. ISBN 978-1-4766-0794-8.
- Popple, S.; Kember, J. (2019). Early Cinema: From Factory Gate to Dream Factory. Short Cuts. Columbia University Press. ISBN 978-0-231-85031-5.
- Diamonstein-Spielvogel, B. (2011). The Landmarks of New York, Fifth Edition: An Illustrated Record of the City's Historic Buildings. Excelsior Editions. State University of New York Press. ISBN 978-1-4384-3771-2.
- Ward, L.W. (1985). The Motion Picture Goes to War: The U.S. Government Film Effort During World War I. Studies in cinema. UMI Research Press. ISBN 978-0-8357-1683-3.
- Cohen, D. (2000). Yellow Journalism: Scandal, Sensationalism, and Gossip in the Media. Book Collection Nonfiction: Middle School Edition. Twenty-First Century Books. ISBN 978-0-7613-1502-5.
