= The Tale of Sim Ch'ŏng =

Korean folk story

- Hangul: 심청전
- Hanja: 沈淸傳
- Revised Romanization: Simcheongjeon
- McCune–Reischauer: Simch'ŏngjŏn

The Story of Sim Cheong or The Tale of Sim Ch'ŏng (Korean: 심청전; Hanja: 沈淸傳) is a Korean classical novel about a filial daughter named Sim Cheong. Simcheongga, the pansori version, performed by a single narrator, is believed to be the older version of the story, with the novel having been adapted from its script. Some examples of the story, though nominally referred to as novels, are practically the same as the pansori libretti, and are thus referred to as "pansori novels".

Woodblock-printed editions, written entirely in Hangul, were issued in the early 20th century. These books, printed in Jeonju (referred to as "Wanpan bon" editions), fall in the "pansori novel" category. The Seoul woodblock editions (called "Gyeongpan bon" editions) assume the more conventional literary style of the novel.

== Summary ==
Sim Cheong-jeon is a story about the titular Sim Cheong, who throws herself into the Indang Sea as a sacrifice so that her blind father can regain his eyesight. This selfless act of filial piety causes her to be resurrected and become an empress, and her father's blindness is cured.

== Literary forms and versions ==
=== Genres ===
The Tale of Sim Cheong (Korean: 심청전; Hanja: 沈淸傳; RR: Sim Cheong jeon) refers to the classical novel (or pansori novel) form of the legend, while the "Simcheongga (Song of Sim Cheong)" (심청가; 沈淸歌; Sim Cheong ga) refers to p'ansori performed version.

There is also the form performed by the mudang shamanesses at the gut ritual, and the recited text may be referred to as the "Shamanic Song of Sim Cheong" (심청긋무가; 沈淸巫祭巫歌; Sim Cheong gut muga).

=== Texts ===
There are handwritten, woodblock print, and metal-type print editions of Sim Cheong-jeon. And despite the aforementioned convention that the pansori works be distinguished as Sim Cheong ga ("Song") and not be referred to as Sim Cheong jeun ("Story"), The Complete Collection of Sim Cheong jeon (1997) edited by Kim Jinyoung, Kim Hyun Ju, et al. (1997) include p'ansori recordings and libretti also, and amassing 83 variant texts in the compilation.

The woodblock editions are largely divided into three groups: the “Hannam edition” version and the “Songdong edition” version in close-to-prose form, and the “Jeonju edition” version set down in verse. (Note: Rather than being characterized as "verses", perhaps the "Jeonju edition" should be described as oral-type literature. Other commentators note that the Jeonju/Wanpan editions are practically like the p'ansori libretti, and characterized as a "p'ansori novel", as will be explained below.)

The Hannam Seolim (한남서림; 翰南書林; Hannam Sărim, 1917) edition and Songdong (송동; 宋洞) editions were both printed in Seoul, and are collectively known as the Seoul editions version (남서림; 京板本; Gyeongpan bon). The Jeonju (전주; 全州) edition, named after the city, is also called the Wanpan (송동; 完板) version after Wansan, the archaic name for the city. These Seoul woodblock editions date to pre-1920, while the Wanpan woodblock editions were issued from 1905 to 1916.

Although referred to as novels, many of these (especially Wanpan editions) were virtually theatrical scripts in their style of writing, in fact, they are not much different from the p'ansori libretti. And they are referred to as "p'ansori novels" or "pansori-based novels" for that reason (Cf. §Pansori novel below). More like conventional novels, and written in the "literary style" (문장체; 文章體; munjang ch'e) are the Seoul editions.

Although the woodblock-printed texts are entirely in hangul, there are handwritten transcriptions which supply information on the equivalent Chinese characters.

Content-wise, the major differences among the three versions are: 1) the appearance of a celestial being who comes down to earth (Hannam edition version), 2) the appearance of Bbaengdeok's mother (Songdong edition version), and 3) the appearance of Lady Jang (Jeonju edition version). Generally, the Hannam edition is considered to be the earliest version of Sim Cheong-jeon, followed by the Songdong edition and the Jeonju edition. Sometimes the different editions of Sim Cheong-jeon are grouped by whether the writing style shows characteristics of pansori or written fiction; by the different spellings of the name of Sim Cheong's father; and by the differences in the section featuring Lady Jang. Most handwritten editions of Sim Cheong-jeonare considered to be the Jeonju edition version.

== Plot ==
A summary of the tale, common to both the Wanpan/Jeonju and Seoul editions, are as follows: (Note: A summary for the plot common to the Wanpan and Seoul editions is given in Jhong's paper (1997), written in Japanese, which references Kim Taejun 金台俊 (1975) [1933], History of the Korean novel (Korean title:Joseon Soseolsa). Pihl's English translation uses a Wanpan text as its base, and his spelling employs the McCune-Reischauer Romanization. Reformed spelling is used in the summary in the Encyclopedia of Korean Folk Literature, as well as the Sim Jeong-ga synopsis quoted by Kim Dong-keon.)

Long ago, northern Korea's Hwangju County had a district named Dohhwa-dong (도화동; 桃花洞; Tohwa ward), literally "Peach Blossom Village"), where lived a destitute family descended from the yangban (noble) class. The daughter Sim Cheong (심청; 沈清; Shim Ch'ŏng) had Blind Man Sim, full name Sim Hakgyu (심학규; 沈鶴圭; Shim Hakkyu, Blindman Shim) as father, raising the girl alone after the death of the mother, Lady Gwak (곽씨; 郭氏; Gwak ssi; Kwak-ssi).

Blind Man Sim received a tip from a Buddhist monk that he might recover his sight by offering 300 seom or "sacks" of rice to Buddha, and the Blind Man pledges to do so. To pay for this donation, the daughter Sim Cheong (who is now 15 years old) decides to sell herself to sea merchants who plan to sacrifice her to the Indang Sea (인당수; 印塘水; Indangsu). But after Sim Cheong throws herself into the water, by the grace of the Jade Emperor she is taken to the Dragon Palace of the Dragon King. She is later sent back up to the terrestrial world, contained inside a lotus flower, and is chosen as the new wife of the Chinese emperor of the Song dynasty. Now an empress, Sim Cheong hosts a feast for the blind and reunites with her father. Overjoyed at the reunion with his daughter, Blind Man Sim regains his eyesight.

Although the versions of editions printed in Seoul tend to be relatively unpolished, Jeonju edition versions are more detailed and elaborate, featuring a variety of characters, including Lady Jang, Bbaengdeok's mother, Gwideok's mother, and Blind Hwang. The time settings of the plot may also vary depending on the versions from different eras.

=== Bbaengdeok's mother ===
Bbaengdeok's mother (뺑덕어미; Ppaengdók's mother) is a character who appears after Sim Cheong falls into the waters of Indangsu. She swindles Blind Man Sim into marrying her, and steals his money. The negative image of Bbaengdeok's mother is apparent from the description of her appearance and actions. Although there are differences in different editions, in most cases, Bbaengdeok's mother is described as an ugly woman with a strong sexual appetite. She becomes a more prominent character in the Jeonju editions and the version written by Sin Jae-hyo (신재효; 申在孝; Shin Chae-hyo, 1812–1884), and Sim Cheong's father also becomes more important in the plot. This has led some scholars to argue that Sim Cheong's father becomes a main character in the Jeonju edition version, while Sim Cheong is the sole main character in earlier versions of Sim Cheong-jeon. On the way to the feast for the blind that Sim Cheong hosts as an empress, Bbaengdeok's mother falls in love with Blind Man Hwang and runs away with him, leaving Sim Cheong's father behind. In relation to the appearance of Bbaengdeok's mother, the yangban culture is often discussed as an important aspect shown through Sim Cheong's father, who is depicted as a foolish man who becomes infatuated with a woman and squanders his fortune away. This shows that while Sim Cheong-jeon tells the story of Sim Cheong's filial piety on the surface, the depiction of Sim Cheong's father shows people's criticism of the reality and ideologies of the time.

== Origins ==
The identity of the author is unknown, and the period in which this novel was created is also unknown. Since there is mention of a jeongisu (professional storyteller) reading Sim Cheong-jeon in Chujaejip (秋齋集 Collected Writings of Chujae Jo Susam), written by Jo Susam (趙秀三, 1762–1847), scholars have concluded that Sim Cheong-jeon must have existed as a complete work in the 18th century.

=== Pansori novel ===
There exist examples of the novel that closely resemble the p'ansori version, which are generically called "pansori novels". Hence it has been argued that Sim Cheong novel all derive from p'ansori, however, the converse has been argued as well, some believing that the novel version came before the pansori.

As mentioned earlier, Wanpan versions of the novels in particular are considered "p'ansori novels", and though called the novel, are practically the same as a p'ansori libretto or a script for a play. There are handwritten versions that are examples of "pansori novels" as well.

=== Folktale hypothesis ===
While some commentators consider the novel to be a folktale, detractors have noted that it is not a folktale as such. The folktale hypothesis stipulates that there must have existed a folk narrative (설화; 說話; seolhwa) about Sim Cheong early on. This later became the p'ansori, Sim Cheong-ga, thence adapted as pansori-based novels, represented by the Wanpan edition group. Meanwhile, the folk narratives may have first developed into novel style, later printed in Seoul woodblock editions, then adapted to (modern) p'ansori, or so it has been explained by one commentator.

=== Composite of different narratives ===
Another school of thought is that the Sim Cheong-jeon as is presently known did not anciently exist as a folk narrative, but was invented as a piece of fiction, cobbling together various plotlines and motifs from narratives recorded in old literature.

Thus the Sim Cheong narrative or novel may have been fictionally invented using source material found in the medieval Korean historical tracts, Samguk sagi and Samguk yusa. Specifically, Hyonyeo Jieun seolhwa (효녀지은설화; 孝女知恩說話, "Story of Jieun, a Filial Daughter") found in the former and Gwaneumsa yeongi seolhwa (관음사연기설화; 觀音寺緣起說話, "Story about the Origin of Gwaneumsa Temple") and Geotaji (居陀知) narratives found in the latter are the candidate source materials, according to the hypothesis by Kim Taejun.

Hyonyeo Jieun seolhwa tells the story of a girl named Jieun who took care of her mother by selling her body. Gwaneumsa yeongi seolhwa is about Won Hongjang who made an offering to the Buddha for her father and later became an empress. After becoming an empress, she sent a statue of Gwaneum to Korea, and Gwaneum Temple was built in Gokseong to house the statue. The Geotaji narrative (Samguk yusa, Book 2) contains closely similar motifs, such as the sacrifice being thrown into a pond, and the dragon transforming into a flower. (Note: Although the archer Geotaji was not himself thrown into the water, but wooden lots with the soldiers' names were cast in water and his name-tag which sank got him selected as the one to be abandoned by the dragon pond.)

According to one analysis (Jung Ha-young 鄭夏英), at the base are three types of narrative or tale-types: tales about regaining eyesight, (Note: 개안설화; 開眼說話; gaean seolhwa.) tales of virgin sacrifice, (Note: 처녀생지설화; 處女生贄說話; cheonyeo saengji seolhwa.) and heroic tales, (Note: 영웅설화; 英雄說話; yeong'ung seolhwa.) with some 17 additional folklore motifs added, such as birth origins and downfall of a blind man.

== Cultural references ==
This work has been rewritten as modern fiction and poem and also adapted into song, TV show, film, changgeuk (Korean classical opera), opera, musical, madang nori, and children's book.

=== Ballet ===
- Shim Chung (Korean: 심청; Hanja: 沈淸) (October 2019): Universal Ballet held a ballet performance.

=== Film ===
- Empress Chung (Korean: 왕후심청; Hanja: 王后沈淸; RR: Wanghu Simcheong) (2005)
- Simcheongjeon (Korean: 심청전; Hanja: 沈淸傳; RR: Simcheongjeon) (1925)
- Simcheongjeon (Korean: 심청전; Hanja: 沈淸傳; RR: Simcheongjeon) (1937)
- The Story of Sim Cheong (Korean: 대심청전; Hanja: 大沈淸傳; RR: Daesimcheongjeon) (1962)
- The Tale of Shim Chong (Korean: 효녀 심청; Hanja: 孝女沈淸; RR: Hyonyeo Simcheong) (1972)
- The Tale of Shim Chong (1985): The story was adapted twice on screen by Shin Sang-ok, once in South Korea in 1972, and as The Tale of Shim Chong in 1985 when he and his wife Choi Eun-hee were abducted to North Korea.

=== Literature ===
- Gangsangnyeon (Korean: 강상련; Hanja: 江上蓮; lit. 'Lotus in the River'): This work was also rewritten into a sinsoseol by Yi Hae-jo (Korean: 이해조; Hanja: 李海朝) (1869–1927). Gangsangnyeon was published in 33 installments in Maeil Shinbo from March 17 to April 26, 1912. Yi also adapted Gangsangnyeon into a changgeuk as well (Tale of Sim Cheong, 1912).
- I Become the Dragon King's Chef (Korean: 용왕님의 셰프가 되었습니다; RR: Yongwangnim ui syepeu ga doeeotseumnida) (2017)
- Shim Jung Takes the Dive by (2026): A middle grade novel by Julia Riew. A tween finds herself on an epic adventure across an underwater kingdom in this inventive middle-grade fantasy inspired by the tale of Sim Cheong.

=== Other ===
- Gokseong Simcheong Children's Grand Festival (Korean: 곡성 심청 어린이 대축제; RR: Gogseong Simcheong eolin-i daechugje) (2021–): The town of Gokseong in Jeollanam-do hosts the annual Sim Cheong Festival (Korean: 심청축제; Hanja: 沈淸祝祭; RR: Simcheongchukje) (2001–2020) in an attempt to celebrate Sim Cheong's filial piety and reinterpret the meaning of filial piety in modern society. Gokseong is considered to be the setting for Gwaneunsa yeongi seolhwa, which is known to be the original story on which this work is based.

=== Theater ===
- Japgeuk Sim Cheong wanghu-jeon (Korean: 잡극 심청왕후전; Hanja: 雜劇沈淸王后傳; lit. 'Miscellaneous Play: Tale of Queen Sim Cheong') (1907–1908): Yeo Gyu-hyeong (Korean: 여규형; Hanja: 呂圭亨) (1848–1921) rewrote this work in Chinese characters. This edition was created for a performance at Wongaksa, the first modern Korean theater, and therefore is presumed to have been written sometime between 1907 and 1908, when performances were staged at Wongaksa.
- The Tale of Sim Chong (Korean: 심청전; Hanja: 沈淸傳; RR: Simcheongjeon) (1993)

=== Video game ===
- MapleStory (2003) – Korean Folk Town quests (2006, 2015)

=== Webtoon ===
- Baramsori (Korean: 바람소리; lit. 'Wind Noise') (2014)
- Her Tale of Shim Chong (Korean: 그녀의 심청; RR: Geunyeoui Simcheong) (2017)
- Shimbongsajeon (Korean: 심봉사전; Hanja: 沈奉事傳) (2013)

== Translations ==
=== English ===
- J. S. Gale, "The Story of Sim Chung," Gale, James Scarth Papers, unpublished.
- H. N. Allen, "SIM CHUNG, The Dutiful Daughter," Korean Tales, New York & London: The Knickerbocker Press, 1889.
- Charles M. Taylor, Winning Buddha's Smile; A Korean Legend, Boston: Goham Press, 1919.
- Hyo-Yun Yun; Hyŏp Lee (illustr.), The story of Shim Ch'ŏng, Kum Sung Publishing Company, 1985
- W. E. Skillend, “The Story of Shim Chung,” Korean Classical Literature: An Anthology, London: Kengan Paul International, 1989.
- Marshall R. Pihl, “The Song of Shim Ch'ŏng,” The Korean Singer of Tales (The Harvard-Yenching Institute Monograph Series, 37), Harvard University Press, 1994.
- Riordan, James. "Blindman's Daughter Shim Chung". Korean Folk-tales. Oxford Myths and Legends. Oxford: Oxford University Press, 2000 [1994]. pp. 4–13.

=== French ===
- Le Bois Sec Refleuri, translated by HONG-TJYONG-OU, Ernest Leroux, 1895.

== See also ==
- Baengnyeongdo
- Korean folklore
