= Love, Love, My Love =

- Video CD cover
- Directed by: Shin Sang-ok
- Written by: Ri Hyong-su; Hang Tong-ho
- Based on: The Tale of Chunhyang
- Starring: Jang Song-hui; Ri Hak-chol; Kim Myong-hui; Son Wun-ju; Pang Pok-sung; Choe Chang-su; Choi Eun-hee
- Cinematography: Pak Seung-ho; Cho Myung-hon
- Music by: Jeun Chang-joun
- Production company: Shin Films
- Release date: 1985 (North Korea)
- Running time: 90 minutes
- Country: North Korea
- Language: Korean

Love, Love, My Love (Korean: 사랑 사랑 내사랑; MR: Sarang sarang naesarang) is a 1985 North Korean musical film in the genre of romantic melodrama. It was directed and produced by South Korea's Shin Sang-ok while he and his wife Choi Eun-hee were abductees in North Korea.

The plot is based on the Korean folk tale, The Tale of Chunhyang. Chunhyang falls in love with the upper-class Ri Mong-ryong, but they must marry in secret. Mong-ryong is sent away to become a government official. While he is away, Chunhyang is imprisoned by a corrupt governor. Mong-ryong returns just in time to save her from execution and the two can publicly proclaim their love.

Jang Song-hui who plays the lead part of Chunhyang was an unusual choice. Her features were sharp and Western, which was not what Kim Jong Il, whose preferences were usually followed, appreciated in a woman. Shin's wife Choi Eun-hee makes an appearance as Chunhyang's mother. Shin utilized techniques from North Korean mass games to realize the song-and-dance spectacles of the film.

Love, Love, My Love was an immense success that the North Korean audience loved. Its liberal view on sexuality, including the first kiss on North Korean screens, was what attracted many people to go and see the film several times. The popular success of the film even caused illegal ticket re-selling for the first time ever in Pyongyang.

== Plot ==
Chunhyang is the daughter of a kisaeng (Korean geisha), whose father has died. She loses her shoe during the Dano festival. It is found and returned to her by Ri Mong-ryong, a scholar-magistrate and son of an aristocrat. Chunhyang, embarrassed and modest, flees after this first encounter. Mong-ryong's valet Pang Ja and Chunhyang's servant Hyang Dan conspire to arrange a meeting between Mong-ryong, Chunhyang and her mother. After this proper introduction, the two fall in love, as do the servants. Mong-ryong's father does not approve of Chunhyang because of her lower social class, but the two get married in secret. Mong-ryong is sent to the capital to be educated as a government official. While he is away, the province where Chunhyang lives in gets a new governor. The governor wants to make Chunhyang his mistress, but when she refuses, he throws her in jail. When Chunhyang continues to oppose the governor, he commands her to be executed. Mong-ryong is sent back to Chunhyang's province to root out corrupt officials. He arrives just in time to save Chunhyang's life. He punishes the governor and publicly declares his love for Chunhyang.

== Production ==
Love, Love, My Love is a lighthearted musical in the genre of romantic melodrama. It is based on an ancient Korean folk tale, The Tale of Chunhyang. Shin Sang-ok had already filmed the story in 1961 in South Korea under the title Seong Chun-hyang. The story also had a previous North Korean film adaptation by Yu Won-jun and Yun Ryong-gyu called The Tale of Chunhyang (1980).

Love, Love, My Love, like many other films, was directed by Shin while he and his wife Choi Eun-hee were abducted in North Korea to make films for the regime. Shin started on the work after his previous North Korean film, An Emissary of No Return (1984). Love, Love, My Love was directed by Shin and produced by his North Korean company Shin Films. The script was written by Ri Hyong-su and Hang Tong-ho. The cast includes Jang Song-hui, Ri Hak-chol, Kim Myong-hui, Son Wun-ju, Pang Pok-sung, Choe Chang-su, and Choi Eun-hee. Jang Song-hui, in the role of Chunhyang, has sharp and Western-like features. They were the polar opposite of the preference of Kim Jong Il, who usually chose stars according to his personal liking. Ri Hak-chol plays the part of Mong-ryong. Choi Eun-hee makes an appearance as Chunhyang's mother.

Shin used techniques of North Korean mass games to produce large song-and-dance numbers in Love, Love, My Love. Hundreds, or even thousands, of extras were needed. The song that plays with the ending credits became one of the most recognizable songs of the country. Love, Love, My Love was released 1985.

== Reception ==
Love, Love, My Love became immensely popular. Many people went to re-watch the film over and over again. Many North Korean defectors have testified to seeing the film seven or eight times, and in one case as much as 20. For the first time ever, unauthorized ticket re-sellers appeared in Pyongyang selling tickets to the film. Paul Fischer, the author of A Kim Jong Il Production, describes the craze caused by the film:

Students put pictures of the film's leading man up in their rooms – the first time the picture of an ordinary North Korean other than Kim Il Sung or Kim Jong Il appeared on residence walls, albeit unframed and on a separate wall, hidden away – and went home to fantasize not about the revolution but about him, the first North Korean leading man to be allowed sex appeal and tenderness.

Love, Love, My Love is noted for its liberal attitude toward sex in a society that remained sexually conservative even after the revolution. This aspect of the film has been interpreted as trying to bring social norms to the level of social reality, although the focus is on interpersonal love. It was the first North Korean film to portray romance and expression of love for anything other than the ruling Workers' Party of Korea. Even the title was the first to include the word love. It features the first kiss in North Korean cinema, albeit partially obscured behind an umbrella, much more subtle than, for instance, the French kisses in Shin's 1958 South Korean film A Flower in Hell, the first kisses in any Korean film. It retained much audience attention. North Korean defectors have testified to remembering the film for its scandalous scenes in particular, something that they had come to appreciate as a new feature in North Korean cinema brought about by Shin's films: "The most attractive thing for audiences was that [Shin's films] were a bit erotic", one defector said. Love, Love, My Love was chosen as the 12th best North Korean film in a survey of 100 defectors.

Lee Hyangjin, the author of Contemporary Korean Cinema, interprets Love, Love, My Love as a distinctively male outlook on the Tale of Chunhyang. Even the title suggests that Chunhyang's life does not exist without the presence of a man. Another current in the film according to Lee is a conflict resulting from trying to present the story through the lenses of both Confucianism and socialism.

== See also ==
- Abduction of Shin Sang-ok and Choi Eun-hee
- Cinema of Korea
- List of North Korean films
