= An Emissary of No Return =

- Title screen
- Hangul: 돌아오지 않은 밀사
- RR: Doraoji aneun milsa
- MR: Toraoji anŭn milsa
- Directed by: Shin Sang-ok; Choi Eun-hee
- Written by: Shin Sang-ok
- Based on: Bloody Conference by Kim Il Sung
- Produced by: Lee Hyon-soo
- Starring: Kim Jun-sik; Ryang Hye-sung; Kim Yun-hong; Kim Chong-hwa; Kim Ok-hui; Hong-Sung-jong; Choe Chang-su; Mun Ye-bong
- Cinematography: Pak Gwan-yong
- Edited by: Kim Ryon-soon
- Music by: Kim Ji-hon
- Production company: Shin Film
- Distributed by: Joseon Yeonghwa
- Release date: 1984 (North Korea)
- Running time: 132 minutes
- Country: North Korea
- Language: Korean

An Emissary of No Return (Korean: 돌아오지 않은 밀사) is a 1984 North Korean historical drama film directed by Shin Sang-ok and Choi Eun-hee. Shin also wrote the script. It was the first of four films Shin and Choi made during their abduction to North Korea under the orders of Kim Jong Il. Adapted from Bloody Conference (Korean: 혈분만국회; Hanja: 血憤萬國會), a play allegedly written by Kim Il Sung during his guerrilla years, the film retells the dramatized story of the Hague Secret Emissary Affair. The affair ensued when the Korean Emperor Gojong sent three unauthorized emissaries to the talks of the Hague Convention of 1907.

The film focuses on the deeds of Ri Jun (played by Kim Jun-sik), one of the emissaries. The emissaries were to protest against Korea's occupation by Japan to the international community in order to get the great powers to overturn the Japan–Korea Treaty of 1905. The emissaries were refused because Korea had lost its sovereignty and its external affairs were now handled by Japan. Although in reality the Hague affair was an unremarkable diplomatic effort, a commonly believed myth among Koreans is that Ri Jun committed suicide inside the conference hall. An Emissary of No Return portrays this dramatized version in the form of a nationalist melodrama.

An Emissary of No Return was shot on-location in several Eastern Bloc countries, primarily Czechoslovakia, as well as in North Korea. The film features various elements never seen before in North Korean cinema, including crediting individual crew members, Western actors in roles of Westerners, and stock footage of The Hague, a Western location. After enthusiastic domestic reception, the film was sent to the Karlovy Vary Film Festival, where it won the Special Jury Prize for Best Director. The award went to Choi Eun-hee, because the film credits her as the main director. In North Korea, the film was used for propaganda, in spite of Shin Sang-ok's attempts not to make an overtly propagandist film. Limited releases were made abroad.

== Plot ==
The film begins with a North Korean man visiting The Hague in the 1980s to pay his respects at the grave of one of the secret emissaries, Ri Jun (played by Kim Jun-sik). The man meets a daughter of the landlord who provided lodging for the three secret emissaries in 1907. The woman's reminiscences point to the story of Ri Jun.

The rest of the film focuses on Ri Jun during the 1907 conference. He forces his way into the conference hall and delivers a long and fiery speech on independence and self-determination. The film features his historical speech in full. When Ri finds that the delegates of the great powers remain unsympathetic to the Korean cause, he commits harakiri in front of them, convincing them of his dedication.

== Cast ==
- Kim Jun-sik as Ri Jun
- Ryang Hye-sung
- Kim Yun-hong
- Kim Chong-hwa
- Kim Ok-hui
- Hong-Sung-jong
- Choe Chang-su
- Mun Ye-bong
- Son Dae-won
- Hwang Min
- Kim Ming-hui
- Miroslav Homola
- Jana Kasanová
- Miroslav Zounar
- Milan Riehs

== Historical basis ==
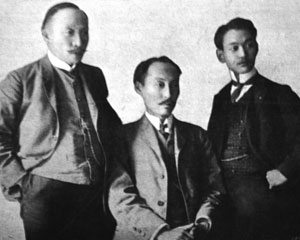
The three secret emissaries of Korea, whose dramatized story the film tells, focusing on Ri Jun (left)

An Emissary of No Return retells the story of a real historical event in 1907 known as the Hague Secret Emissary Affair. Korea had been colonized by Japan. In order to protest to the international community, the Korean emperor king Gojong sent three secret emissaries to the talks of the Hague Convention of 1907. Their mission was to get the great powers to overturn the Japan–Korea Treaty of 1905. The emissaries were refused on the basis that Korea had lost its sovereignty and its external affairs were now handled by Japan.

In reality, the incident was "quick and quiet". The emissaries worked behind the scenes, and one of them died of illness during the trip. Korean nationalist historiography, however, presents the affair in "mythical proportions". Even many South Koreans continue to believe in the dramatic suicide of one of the emissaries, which in reality, did not take place. An Emissary of No Return presents the dramatized story, resulting in a "typical nationalist melodrama", and, partly, a boring "lecture" on fictionalized history.

== Production ==
=== Background ===
Shin Sang-ok was abducted to North Korea on the orders of Kim Jong Il to make films for the country, whose own film industry had fallen out of times. Shin was initially uncooperative and was imprisoned for years. Then, after Kim Jong Il had him released, Shin decided to agree to his proposal. Shin had two motives. He could return to his career of film making that had become impossible abroad due to financial difficulties. Shin also decided that by creating films for Kim, he would be trusted enough to travel abroad, where he could escape. An Emissary of No Return would become the first film Shin made for Kim Jong Il.

Kim Jong Il ordered Shin to set up a production company for his film projects in North Korea. The company was called Shin Film, adopting the name of Shin's old company he had run in South Korea.

After discussing with Kim Jong Il, Shin had chosen the Hague Secret Emissary Affair as the theme of the film. Shin had, again, a dual motivation. He wanted to play it safe and create a film that was not too different from previous North Korean films, but not overtly propagandist. To achieve this, he suggested to Kim that he could adapt one of the plays allegedly written by Kim Il Sung during his guerrilla years on film. Shin settled on a particular play about the emissary incident, Bloody Conference, which he had also seen on stage. Shin was drawn to it because the event it portrays had taken place abroad, in The Hague, in hopes that he could escape on the pretext of filming at the actual location. On the other hand, Kim Jong Il was keen on international settings, hoping that they would elevate North Korean cinema to the international level. Kim accepted the film idea, but did not allow Shin to travel to The Hague, despite telling him earlier that he was free to travel "anywhere" to film. "Anywhere", Kim had to clarify, meant anywhere within the Eastern Bloc. It is not known whether Shin knew that the plot of Bloody Conference depicts nothing more than a historical myth, but that did not matter much to his ambitions. As Johannes Schönherr writes: "The myth was so much better... and Kim Il-sung had written a play about it. Kim Il-sung's every word was holy and not to be questioned in any way."

After having discussed his film ideas with Kim Jong Il on 19 October 1983, Shin had decided that Shin Film's first film should be ready by 15 April the next year, the birthday of Kim Il Sung.

=== Filming ===
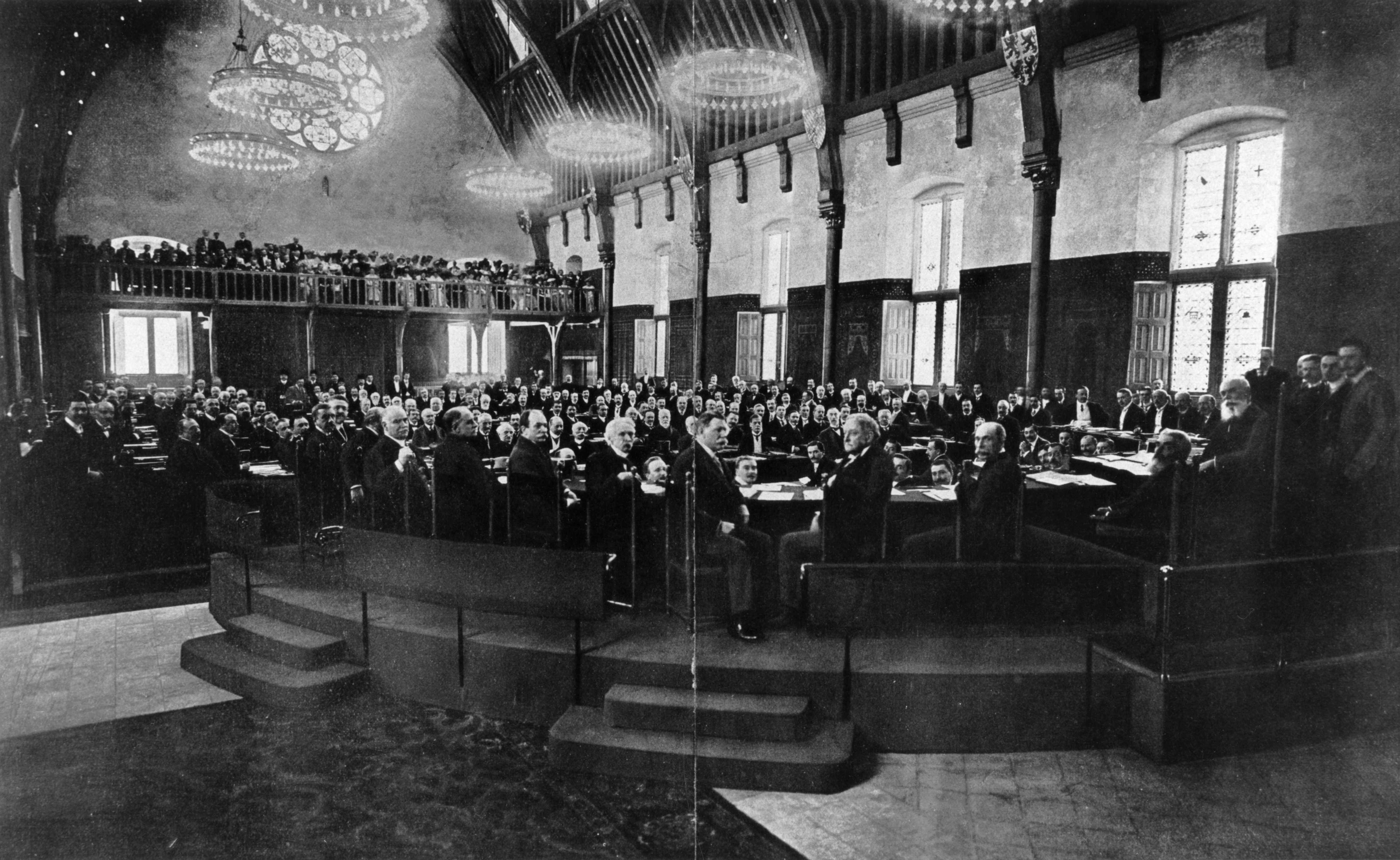
The Ridderzaal in The Hague during the conference. A replica was created at the Barrandov Studios for filming.

Shin first traveled to East Berlin for three days to scout for filming locations. He was accompanied by his wife, Choi Eun-hee, who was also abducted by Kim Jong Il. Choi, an actress, had no role in the film, so she would help Shin as the co-director. After Berlin, they traveled to Prague. They were minded by Kim's film tutor, Choe Ik-gyu during all their trips. In directing, Shin would employ aesthetic theories developed by Kim Jong Il.

Filming began at the Barrandov Studios in Prague a few days after Shin had arrived there, in November 1984. One of its spacious studio halls was turned into a replica of The Hague's Ridderzaal. Although the Czech technical crew was very qualified, the Koreans lacked a common language with them, causing problems in the production. Shots depicting The Hague were also filmed on the streets of Prague, which "might look strange to audiences with knowledge of European architecture but it certainly didn't bother anyone in North Korea." Stock footage of the actual city was also used. This was the first time that a North Korean film had footage shot outside of the country. The film also featured Western actors and extras for Western roles, something that likewise had never been done before in North Korean cinema. On Kim Jong Il's orders, all lines were dubbed into Korean. The final scene was rushed and shot in only one and a half day with massive 400 extras.

After filming had been completed in Prague, Shin returned to Pyongyang to film portions that take place in Korea. Then, he had to edit the film as quickly as possible so that he could make 15 April 1984 deadline. After a brief trip to Budapest, where Shin confided to his old friend that he and Choi were making films for Kim Jong Il against their will, they worked on the film in North Korea throughout January and February. The production was finished early, on 13 March 1984. A preview was scheduled for three days later at the Workers' Party of Korea headquarters. Kim Jong Il was very pleased with the film. He called it "fantastic" and "just like a European movie". He gave Shin and Choi two brand-new Mercedes-Benz as gifts.

Shin petitioned Kim Jong Il that he could travel to Leningrad to shoot additional scenes for the film to improve it. Kim agreed to this, and so Shin traveled to Moscow for three days in March 1984. Shin shot in the Baroque Quarter and the old Korean Legation in the city center. A second preview with the improved version was held on the birthday of Kim Il Sung in his presence.

== Release ==
An Emissary of No Return became a hit in North Korea and was the most significant release of the year. Few North Koreans had seen anything like it. For those born after the division of Korea in 1945, "the opening shots of The Hague were literally their very first glimpse of the world outside". According to Paul Fischer, author of A Kim Jong-Il Production, the film thus "marked a turning point in North Korean culture: the very first time that even the citizens with the lowest songbun [social status] were able to see, however subtly, that the world outside the Workers' Paradise was not the hell Kim Il-Sung had told them it was."

The film was, however, used for indoctrination. Screenings were made compulsory and were followed by group discussions in which cinema goers were supposed to relate the main character's suicide to their own lives.

Following the positive domestic reception, the film was sent to the Karlovy Vary Film Festival in Czechoslovakia, where it was screened in July 1984. The screening was attended by very few people due to neglected advertising. The film, however, scored a surprise victory in the Special Jury Prize for Best Director category. The award went to Choi, not Shin, because the credits of the film were worded: "Directed by Choi Eun-Hee, under the general direction of Shin Sang-Ok". This was Shin's decision, motivated by his personal dissatisfaction with the film. In reality, he had done most of the directing. An Emissary of No Return was the first North Korean film to credit its crew as individuals. Shin was there at the festival and announced at a press conference that, contrary to the truth, he had gone to North Korea voluntarily. Following this announcement Shin was given even freer hands to work on films in North Korea. After An Emissary of No Return, he would direct Runaway later that year.

An Emissary of No Return was subsequently also screened at the London Film Festival in November 1984, where South Korean protesters picketed the screening. There, it was freshly reviewed as having "a broad, oriental-flavoured theme in guises ranging from the march-like to patriotic and romantic for its story of Korean heroism at the turn of the century – a major surprise". To Shin, who was present at the festival accompanied by Choi, London was the ideal place to escape. The couple was, however, constantly surrounded by minders working for Kim Jong Il, so the plan never materialized.

The film was also released in Eastern Bloc countries, and saw limited distribution in Japan, where it was also released in 1984. It was released on DVD in North Korea by Mokran Video in 2015.

== See also ==
- Abduction of Shin Sang-ok and Choi Eun-hee
- Cinema of North Korea
- Culture of North Korea
- List of North Korean films
- Propaganda in North Korea
- Pulgasari
