= A Kim Jong-Il Production =

2015 book by Paul Fischer

- Book cover
- Author: Paul Fischer
- Language: English
- Genre: Non-fiction
- Publisher: Flatiron Books
- Publication date: February 2015
- Publication place: United States
- Pages: 368
- ISBN: 978-1250054265

A Kim Jong-Il Production: The Extraordinary True Story of a Kidnapped Filmmaker, His Star Actress, and a Young Dictator's Rise to Power is a 2015 non-fiction book by Paul Fischer about the abduction of South Korean filmmaker Shin Sang-ok and his wife Choi Eun-hee, their relationships with future North Korean leader Kim Jong Il, and the development of the 1986 monster film Pulgasari.

== Content ==
A Kim Jong-Il Production is split into three acts. Act 1 details Shin and Choi's careers in South Korea during the mid-20th century and Kim Jong Il's previous film-making experience, including how his films secured him as the heir to his father, Kim Il Sung. It presents the career of Shin in the 1960s as a highly successful filmmaker that had directed multiple film genres. Choi, meanwhile, is described as a talented actress that gained widespread fame after suffering through the Korean War. The book also details how during the 1960s, Kim Jong Il lived as a playboy and cinephile that required North Korea's embassies around the world to secretly gather films for him. Shin's filmmaking talent made him an idol to Kim. It makes note that Kim allegedly had one of his lovers, the most popular female film star in North Korea, executed for betraying his trust.

Act 2 describes Shin and Choi's separate abductions in Hong Kong and separate detainments, including Shin's two escape attempts. Shin and Choi were kept separate for five years and subjected to attempted indoctrination. This section of the book focuses on the cruel conditions of their lives in captivity.

Act 3 of the book is about their reunion and decision to help develop North Korean cinema in hopes of escape. It details how Kim came to trust Shin and Choi, and gave them creative freedom in their film development. It notes that Kim had intended for the films to reinvigorate North Korean national pride, but Shin and Choi included some subversive themes in their films that Kim seemingly did not notice. With Kim's supervision, Shin and Choi developed films in North Korea such as Salt and Hong Kil-Dong. These films were highly successful in North Korea as well as the Soviet Union and Eastern Bloc countries. They also notably developed Pulgasari, a kaiju film for which Kim kidnapped a Japanese production crew. Shin and Choi ultimately escaped from North Korean custody and lived in the United States before returning to South Korea.

== Development and release ==
According to author Paul Fischer, he initially planned to adapt the story of Shin and Choi into a fictional story similar to Cecil B. Demented. However, as he looked into the details of the case, he decided to write a non-fiction book. He stated that while researching the book, he was surprised to learn that there is far more research, documentation, and journalism about the internal politics and life in North Korea than he had expected. He said that media often depicts North Korea as a secretive and inscrutable, but that the country actually has a lot of comprehensive coverage.

The primary sources for the information in the book are a memoir by Shin and Choi as well as an interview with Choi. Fischer also went on multiple tours to North Korea as research and visited the Korean Art Film Studio. He stated that he had spoken to a North Korean guide about Shin Sang-ok, but she self-censored and pretended to not know his name. He said that interviewing defectors was more helpful because they can speak freely without fear of repercussion.

The book was released soon after the 2014 Sony Pictures hack by North Korea, prompted by the release of The Interview, a film about journalists trying to assassinate Kim Jong Un, the son of Jong Il. The timing of the book's release gained it attention. Journalist Julie Makinen, writing for Los Angeles Times, noted that "The Interview affair gives some much-needed contemporary resonance to A Kim Jong-Il Production."

== Reception ==
The book saw mixed reception. Hannah McGill of The Independent stated that the book puts too much trust into the version of events presented by Shin and Choi in their memoir, and that "closeness to his subjects' version of events reduces the level of moral complexity in the narrative". She also claimed that the book suffers from "melodramatic" tone and dialogue. Lawrence Levi Newsday of The Daytona Beach News-Journal said that the book suffers from "repetition", "heavy-handed epigraphs", and a "sentimental epilogue", although he claimed that the book is still good, and praised Fischer's humor and wit.

Julie Makinen, writing for Los Angeles Times, stated that "life in North Korea ultimately demands more complex analysis". Janet Maslin of The New York Times said that the part of the book about Kim Jong Il's life was more interesting than the part covering Shin and Choi. She said that the story in the book was "old and ultimately sad", but that not everything in the book can be taken seriously.
