= Galgameth =

1996 film by Sean McNamara

- DVD cover
- Directed by: Sean McNamara
- Written by: Michael Angeli
- Based on: Pulgasari by Shin Sang-ok (uncredited)
- Produced by: Martha Chang
- Starring: Devin Oatway; Sean McNamara; Stephen Macht; Lou Wagner; James Nixon
- Cinematography: Christian Sebaldt
- Edited by: Annamária Szántó; Joe Woo Jr.
- Music by: Richard Marvin
- Production company: Sheen Communications
- Distributed by: Galaxy International Releasing; Kidmark
- Release date: November 18, 1996 (Spain)
- Running time: 110 minutes
- Country: United States
- Language: English
- Budget: $10 million

Galgameth (also released under the titles The Legend of Galgameth and The Adventures of Galgameth) is a 1996 American fantasy film directed by Sean McNamara from a screenplay by Michael Angeli. The film stars Devin Neil Oatway, Johna Stewart and Stephen Macht. It is loosely based on a film Shin Sang-ok directed in 1985 while being held in North Korea, Pulgasari, itself supposedly a remake of a lost 1962 film. Galgameth was produced through Shin's production company Sheen Communications.

== Plot ==
In the medieval kingdom of Donnegold, a young prince named Davin (Devin Oatway) lives with his father, the noble King Henryk (Sean McNamara). This comes to an end when the King's black knight, El El (Stephen Macht), poisons him. As he lays dying, Henryk gives his son a small black statue of a creature. He tells him that it is called "Galgameth", the family guardian of legend. Davin takes it and while he is away mourning his father, El El secretly shatters the statue and takes command, thrusting the kingdom into turmoil under Davin's name. Davin is given the broken statue by a maidservant and cries. The next morning he finds that the statue has become a living creature which he nicknames "Galgy" (Felix Silla and Doug Jones). Brought to life by the prince's tears, Galgameth becomes his friend and guardian as he finds himself chased by El El and in the company of disgruntled peasants who are planning a revolt in order to dethrone the man they think is the source of all their trouble, Prince Davin.

== Cast ==
- Devin Oatway as Prince Davin
- Sean McNamara as King Henryk
- Stephen Macht as El El
- Lou Wagner as Zethar
- Time Winters as Templeton
- James Nixon as Bertrand
- Felix Silla as Little Galgy
- Doug Jones as Big Galgy
- Brendan O'Brien as Heretic
- Tom Dugan as William
- Richard Steven Horvitz as Kinch
- Elizabeth Cheap as Periel
- Patrick Richwood as Grecy
- Ken Thorley as Footy
- Johna Stewart-Bowden as Julia
- Corneliu Țigancu as Zhidao

== Production ==
The production was filmed on locations in Romania, including Bucharest and Zărnești.

== Release ==
Original release was in Spain on November 18, 1996, followed by release in Japan on November 21. Its original Romanian title was Galgameth and had differing titles dependent upon the country and language of later releases. In Germany it was released as Galgameth - Das Ungeheuer des Prinzen. In Spain its video title was as La leyenda de Galgameth and its television release title was Galgameth - El guerrero invencible. In France it was released as Galgameth: L'apprenti dragon. English release titles included both The Legend of Galgameth and the later The Adventures of Galgameth, which was released by Trimark Home Video on July 29, 1997.

== See also ==
- Pulgasari
