= The Lovers and the Despot =

- Theatrical release poster
- Directed by: Robert Cannan; Ross Adam
- Written by: Robert Cannan; Ross Adam
- Produced by: Ross Adam; Robert Cannan; Sheryl Crown; Natasha Dack
- Starring: Choi Eun-hee; Shin Sang-ok; Kim Jong Il
- Narrated by: Choi Eun-hee
- Edited by: Jim Hession
- Music by: Nathan Halpern
- Production companies: BFI; Creative England; BBC Storyville; The Documentary Company; Hellflower Film; Submarine Films; Tigerlily Films
- Distributed by: Soda Pictures; Magnolia Pictures
- Release dates: 22 January 2016 (Sundance Film Festival); 23 September 2016
- Running time: 95 minutes
- Country: United Kingdom
- Languages: English; Korean; Japanese

The Lovers and the Despot is a 2016 British documentary film written and directed by Robert Cannan and Ross Adam, about the 1978 abduction of South Korean actress Choi Eun-hee, and film director Shin Sang-ok, by Kim Jong Il of North Korea. It was pitched at Sheffield Doc/Fest's 2014 MeetMarket.

== Release ==
=== Critical response ===
The Lovers and the Despot has received positive reviews from critics. Review aggregator Rotten Tomatoes gives the film an approval rating of 77%, based on 57 reviews, with an average rating of 6.7/10. The site's consensus states: "The Lovers and the Despot offers a compelling—albeit by no means comprehensive—look at one of the more bizarrely stranger-than-fiction episodes in cinematic history." On Metacritic, the film has a score of 65 out of 100, based on 23 critics, indicating "generally favorable reviews".

Writing for The New York Times, Manohla Dargis stated that "Despite its flaws and will to kitsch, The Lovers and the Despot has enough enigmas and chills to merit a look, even if some of its spookier moments involve cinephilia rather than the usual weapons of mass destruction."

In Jordan Hoffman's review for The Guardian, he wrote that "there's an incredible story somewhere in this tale [...], but this documentary buries it by way of over-measured effects and chronic pussy-footing." In a review for RogerEbert.com, Matt Zoller Seitz called it a "frustrating missed opportunity", saying it "takes a fascinating story about filmmaking, politics, kidnapping and propaganda and gives us almost no insight into the work of its two main characters."

=== Box office ===
As of 3 November 2016, the film has grossed $55,511 at the box office.

== See also ==
- Abduction of Shin Sang-ok and Choi Eun-hee
- Pulgasari
