= Ghosts of Chosun =

- Theatrical poster
- Directed by: Shin Sang-ok
- Written by: Gwak Il-ro
- Produced by: Kim Han-geuk
- Starring: Jo Su-hyeon; Choe Ji-suk; Jeon Young-ju; Lee Gang-hui
- Cinematography: Choi Seung-woo
- Edited by: O Seong-hwan
- Music by: Jeong Yoon-joo
- Production company: Shin Films Co.
- Release date: April 25, 1970
- Running time: 81 minutes
- Country: South Korea
- Language: Korean

Ghosts of Chosun (Korean: 이조괴담; RR: Ijogoedam), or A Ghost Story of Joseon Dynasty, is a 1970 South Korean horror drama film directed by Shin Sang-ok.

== Plot ==
Prince Yeonsan-gun lusts after Yahwa, whose husband Yun Pil-u was executed after being branded a traitor. Yahwa chooses to take her own life in order to be reunited with Pil-u, but before she dies she asks her cat to take revenge for them. Afterwards, the bodies of court ladies and patrol guards are found dead in the palace every morning, and the ghosts of Yahwa and Pil-u are seen accompanied by the mewing of a cat. Kim Chung-won, Pil-u's friend and head of the guardsmen, uses the power of a Buddhist priest to get rid of the ghosts and restore peace to the nation.

== Cast ==
- Jo Su-hyeon
- Choe Ji-suk
- Jeon Young-ju
- Lee Gang-hui
- Choe Gwang-ho
- Lee Ki-young
- Choe In-suk
- Yun So-ra
- Gang Seong-hui
- Lee Nam-hui
- Park Bu-yang
- Jeon Shook
- Sin Dong-ok
- Lee Jong-cheol
- Ji Bang-yeol
