= Phantom Queen =

- Theatrical poster for Phantom Queen (1967)
- Hangul: 다정불심
- Hanja: 多情佛心
- RR: Dajeongbulsim
- MR: Tajŏngbulsim
- Directed by: Shin Sang-ok
- Written by: Choi Keum-dong
- Produced by: Shin Sang-ok
- Starring: Choi Eun-hee
- Cinematography: Kim Jong-rae
- Edited by: O Seong-hwan
- Music by: Kim Hee-jo
- Production company: Anyang Films
- Distributed by: Shin Films Co., Ltd.
- Release date: April 28, 1967
- Running time: 90 minutes
- Country: South Korea
- Language: Korean
- Box office: $5,512

Phantom Queen (Korean: 다정불심) aka Tender Heart (다정불심) is a 1967 South Korean historical drama film directed by Shin Sang-ok.

== Synopsis ==
Towards the end of the Goryeo Dynasty, King Gongmin, grieving for the death of Princess Noguk, gives power to a corrupt and lecherous monk.

== Cast ==
- Choi Eun-hee
- Kim Jin-kyu
- Park Nou-sik
- Choe Seong-ho
- Han Eun-jin
- Choi Sam
- Seong So-min
- Go Seon-ae
- Lee Gi-hong
- Seo Wol-yeong

== Bibliography ==
- 다정불심. Cine21 (in Korean).
