= The Houseguest and My Mother =

- Poster to The Houseguest and My Mother
- Hangul: 사랑방 손님과 어머니
- RR: Sarangbang sonnimgwa eomeoni
- MR: Sarangbang sonnimgwa ŏmŏni
- Directed by: Shin Sang-ok
- Written by: Lim Hee-Jae; Chu Yo-Sup
- Produced by: Shin Sang-ok
- Starring: Choi Eun-hee; Jeon Young-seon
- Cinematography: Choe Su-yeong
- Edited by: Yang Seong-ran
- Music by: Jeong Yun-ju
- Distributed by: Shin Films Co., Ltd
- Release date: August 26, 1961
- Running time: 103 minutes
- Country: South Korea
- Language: Korean

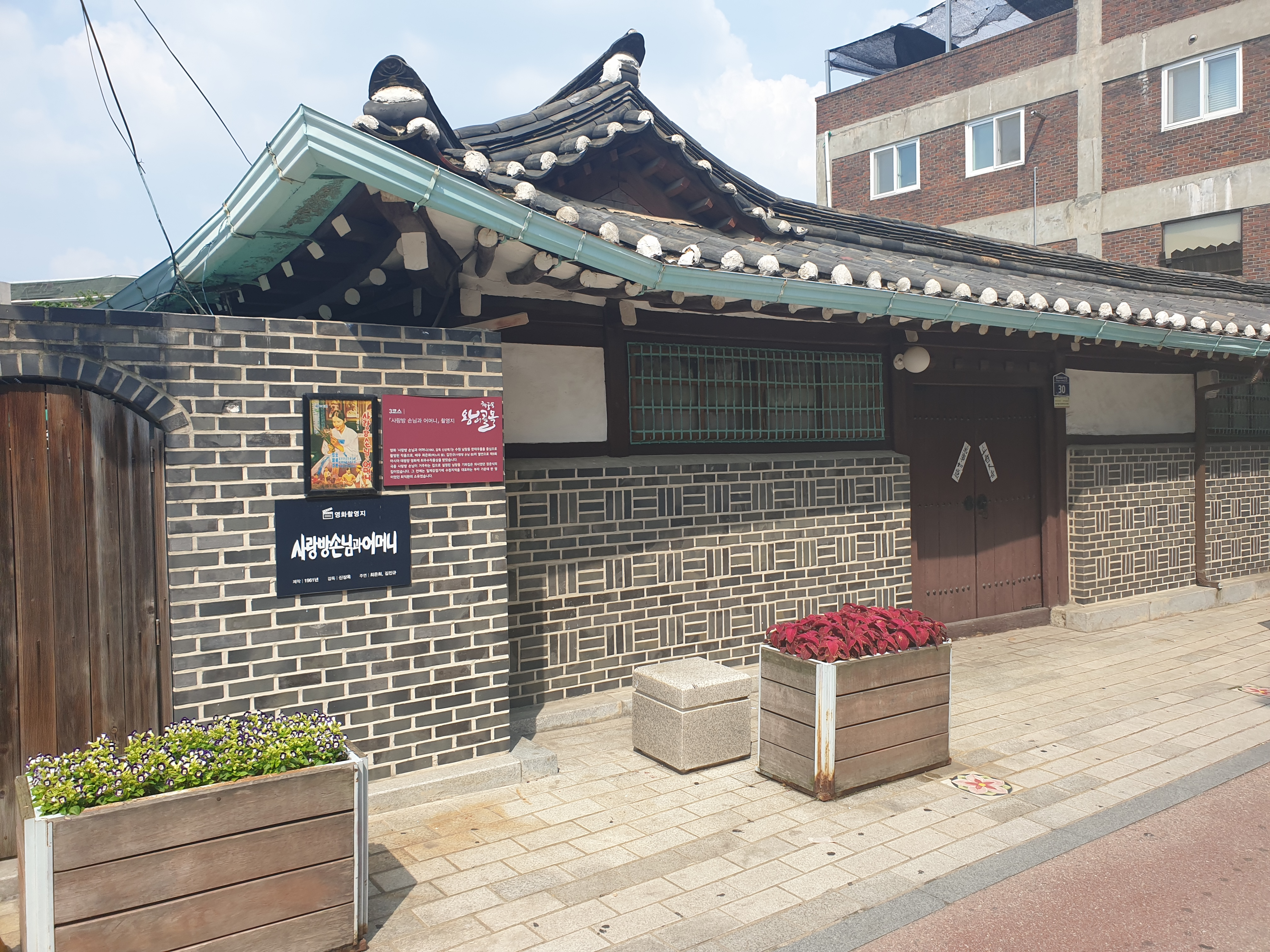
Filming site, at Paldal District, Suwon. This hanok was built in 1937.

The Houseguest and My Mother (Korean: 사랑방 손님과 어머니), also known as Mother and a Guest, is a 1961 South Korean romantic drama film directed by Shin Sang-ok. It is based on a best-selling novel by Chu Yo-Sup.

The film was given the Best Film award at the 1962 Asia Pacific Film Festival. The film was also selected as the South Korean entry for the Best Foreign Language Film at the 35th Academy Awards, but was not accepted as a nominee.

== Plot ==
An artist from Seoul visits the widow of a deceased friend in the countryside. The relationship between the friend's wife, her mother and the artist is depicted with reference to their concerns about social disapproval.

== Cast ==
- Choi Eun-hee
- Jeon Yeong-seon
- Kim Jin-kyu
- Han Eun-jin
- Do Kum-bong

== See also ==
- List of submissions to the 35th Academy Awards for Best Foreign Language Film
- List of South Korean submissions for the Academy Award for Best Foreign Language Film

== Bibliography ==
- 사랑방 손님과 어머니 1961. Cine21 (in Korean).
