= To the Last Day =

1960 film

- Film poster
- Hangul: 이 생명 다하도록
- RR: I saengmyeong dahadorok
- MR: I saengmyŏng tahadorok
- Directed by: Shin Sang-ok
- Written by: Han Woon-sa; Lim Hee-jae
- Produced by: Shin Sang-ok
- Starring: Choi Eun-hee
- Cinematography: Jeong Hae-jun
- Edited by: Kim Yeong-hie
- Music by: Kim Seong-tae
- Production company: Shin Films
- Release date: 1 July 1960
- Running time: 109 minutes
- Country: South Korea
- Language: Korean

To the Last Day (Korean: 이 생명 다하도록, Saengmyeong Dahadorok) is a 1960 South Korean drama film directed by Shin Sang-ok. It was entered into the 12th Berlin International Film Festival where it won the Silver Bear Extraordinary Jury Prize.

== Cast ==
- Choi Eun-hee
- Kim Jin-kyu
- Namkoong Won
- Shin Seong-il
- Kim Hye-jeong
