= Ken Thorley =

American actor (1950–2026)

- Born: July 14, 1950; Hammond, Indiana, U.S.
- Died: April 14, 2026 (aged 75)
- Occupation: Actor
- Years active: 1986–2004

Ken Thorley (July 14, 1950 – April 14, 2026) was an American actor who portrayed various characters in television and film. One of his recurring roles was that of the fictional character "Mot", a Bolian barber on the USS Enterprise-D on Star Trek: The Next Generation (who was also portrayed by Shelly Desai). He also played a seaman in another episode of The Next Generation.

Thorley died on April 14, 2026, at the age of 75.

== Filmography ==
Year	Title	Role	Notes
1988	Wildfire	Bernie	
1991	Defending Your Life	Frank	
1992	White Sands	Kleinman	
1992	Man Trouble	Dr. Monroe Park	
1993	Ghost in the Machine	Salesman	
1996	Galgameth	Footy	
1997	Men in Black	Zap-Em Man	
1997	Switchback	Morgue Attendant	
1999	My Favorite Martian	KGSC-TV Floor Manager	

== Television ==
Year	Title	Role	Notes
1993	NYPD Blue	George Stipley	
2004	Curb Your Enthusiasm	Judge	

== See also ==
- Star Trek: The Next Generation
