= Pulgasari =

1986 film by Shin Sang-ok

- Japanese VHS flyer
- Directed by: Shin Sang-ok (uncredited); Chong Gon-jo
- Written by: Kim Seryun; Ri Chun-gu (uncredited)
- Produced by: Shin Sang-ok; Takeshi Miyanishi (both uncredited)
- Starring: Chang Sŏnhŭi; Ham Kisŏp; Ri Chongguk; Ri Ingwŏn; Yu Kyŏngae; Kenpachiro Satsuma
- Cinematography: Cho Myŏnghyŏn; Pak Sŭngho
- Edited by: Kim Ryŏnsun
- Music by: Sŏ Chŏnggŏn
- Production companies: Korean Art Film Studio; Shin Films; Toho; Beijing Film Studio
- Distributed by: Twin (1995); Raging Thunder (1998)
- Release dates: February 28, 1986 (North Korea); January 21, 1995 (VHS); July 4, 1998 (Tokyo)
- Running time: 95 minutes
- Countries: North Korea; Japan; China
- Language: Korean
- Budget: ¥200–300 million ($2–3 million)

Pulgasari (Note: Korean: 불가사리; RR: Bulgasari; MR: Pulgasari. The film was released in Japan as Giant Monster Pulgasari (Japanese: 大怪獣プルガサリ, Hepburn: Daikaijū Purugasari) and Pulgasari: The Legendary Giant Monster (プルガサリ 伝説の大怪獣, Purugasari: Densetsu no Daikaijū) in 1995 and 1998, respectively. Its title has also been spelled Pulgasary.) is a 1986 monster film (Note: Genres attributed to the following sources:) directed and produced by Shin Sang-ok during his North Korean abduction. A co-production between North Korea, Japan, and China, it is supposedly a remake of Bulgasari, a 1962 South Korean film that also depicts Bulgasari/Pulgasari, a creature from Korean folklore. The ensemble cast includes Chang Sŏnhŭi, Ham Kisŏp, Ri Chongguk, Ri Ingwŏn, and Yu Kyŏngae, with Kenpachiro Satsuma in the title role. Set during the Goryeo dynasty, Pulgasari follows a blacksmith's daughter who brings to life a metal-eating monster her late father created to defeat the monarchy.

Shin and his wife, Choi Eun-hee, were kidnapped in 1978 by agents of Kim Jong Il and held captive in North Korea. Pulgasari was put forward in February 1985 to capitalize on the success of The Return of Godzilla (1984) and became Shin's last film made under Kim Jong Il's orders. Kim Seryun and Ri Chun-gu collaborated on the screenplay. Principal photography took place in Pyongyang from June to August 1985 on an estimated ¥200–300 million ($2–3 million) budget, making it one of the most expensive films produced in North Korea to that time. Some sources suggest that North Korean filmmaker Chong Gon-jo, who was given sole director credit, completed filming on behalf of Shin. A team of 15 Toho employees, including Teruyoshi Nakano, handled special effects photography from September to December.

Pulgasari premiered in North Korea on February 28, 1986, with plans for subsequent international release later that year. However, the film was banned in March after Shin and Choi escaped North Korean supervision and fled to the United States, where Shin later worked on a remake. Pulgasari eventually debuted on VHS in Japan on January 21, 1995, and had its official premiere in Tokyo on July 4, 1998, to commercial success. Critical reception in Japan was positive, with many favorable comparisons to Godzilla (1998). It has since become the most-widely-seen North Korean film internationally, and a cult classic.

== Plot ==
In feudal Korea, toward the end of the Goryeo dynasty, a king strictly controls the land, subjecting the peasantry to misery and starvation. Takse, the finest blacksmith in the land, is imprisoned and starved to death for defending his people. Shortly before he dies, Takse makes a tiny rice figurine of a monster and asks the gods to make his creation into a living creature that protects the rebels and the oppressed. The blacksmith's daughter Ami soon receives the figurine, which springs to life upon contact with her blood after she accidentally wounds herself while sewing. The figurine becomes a metal-eating monster Ami dubs Pulgasari, which is the name of the mythical beast her father used to mention as an eater of iron and steel. Pulgasari shares a special bond with Ami. After eating a farmer's tools, it turns into a powerful figure.

The peasants become fed up with their poverty and suffering, and form an army intent on overthrowing the monarchy with the aid of Pulgasari, which has now become gigantic. Imperial generals kidnap Ami and threaten to kill her if Pulgasari does not enter a large cage they have created. The monster lets itself be trapped to save Ami and is set ablaze, but is unharmed. The rebels later storm the palace of the region's Governor and kill him. Soon after, the king becomes aware that a rebellion is being planned in the country and intends to crush it. The king runs into Pulgasari, who wins many battles against his army because it devours their metal weapons.

Eventually, the royal army seemingly kills the creature by burying it under the ground, captures and executes InDe (the rebellion's leader to whom Ami is betrothed), and threatens to kill Ami if she and the rebels do not surrender. After escaping, Ami revives Pulgasari by pouring some of her blood on the burial site. The creature again grows strong and attacks the king's palace, destroying it and killing the king.

After defeating the king, Pulgasari starts eating the rebels' weapons and farmers' tools, given to the creature without objection because the peasants still believe it is a benign savior. Ami realizes Pulgasari's hunger will never be sated and that the monster is inadvertently oppressing the people it fought for. She sacrifices herself by hiding inside a large bell that Pulgasari finds and quickly eats. The monster yells in anguish as Ami's presence in its body causes it to turn to stone and crumble into pieces, killing both of them but saving the people.

== Cast ==
- Chang Sŏnhŭi (장선희) as Ami, the blacksmith's daughter
- Ham Kisŏp (함기섭) as InDe, Ami's boyfriend
- Ri Chongguk (리종국) as Ana, Ami's brother
- Ri Ingwŏn (리인권) as Takse, the blacksmith
- Pak Yŏnghak (박영학) as the King
- Ri Ryongun (리룡운) as General Hwang, the King's disciplinary
- Pak Pongik (박봉익) as the Governor
- Yu Kyŏngae (유경애) as InDe's mother
- Ro Hyech'ŏl (로혜철) as InDe's brother
- Tae Sanghun (태상훈) as a member of the rebellion
- Kim Kich'ŏn (김기천) as a member of the rebellion
- Ri Ŏnchŏl (리언철) as a member of the rebellion
- Kenpachiro Satsuma as Pulgasari (uncredited) (Note: Attributed to multiple references:)
  - Masao Fukazawa as the infant Pulgasari (uncredited)

== Production ==
=== Crew ===
- Shin Sang-ok – director and producer (uncredited)
- Chong Gon-jo (Note: Attributed to multiple references:) (정건조) – director (Note: Many publications have claimed that Chong Gon-jo was the assistant director and finished the film on behalf of Shin. However, The New Yorker contended that his name was merely used to replace Shin's in the credits. Shin maintained that he directed the film himself. Satsuma reinforced this by saying that Shin was the de facto director and Chong was his assistant. Nonetheless, he said: "I think in the latter half of the shooting, he gave Chong Gon-jo some [free] rein to finish the film." Lee Dong-jin of The Chosun Ilbo asserted that Shin directed 80% of Pulgasari.)
- Takeshi Miyanishi – producer and compositor (uncredited)
- Kim Jong Il – executive producer
- Ro Tongch'ŏn (로동천) – lighting
- Ri Inpŏm (리인범) – lighting
- Ri Toik (리도익) – art director
- Teruyoshi Nakano – special effects director (uncredited)
- Pak Ch'ŏnggil (박청길) – special effects art director
- Yoshio Suzuki – special effects art director (uncredited)
- Kim Tŭkho (김득호) – special effects cinematographer
- Kenichi Eguchi – special effects cinematographer (uncredited)
- Kohei Mikami – special effects lighting (uncredited)
- Nobuyuki Yasumaru – Pulgasari suit modeler (uncredited)

=== Development ===
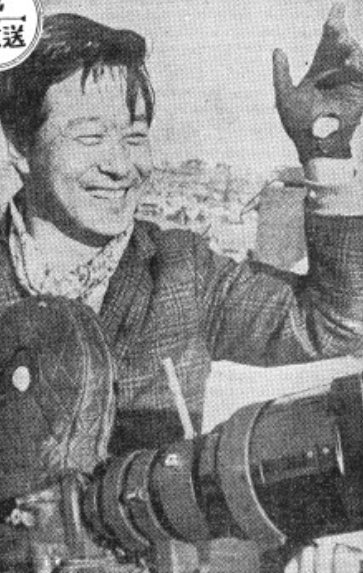
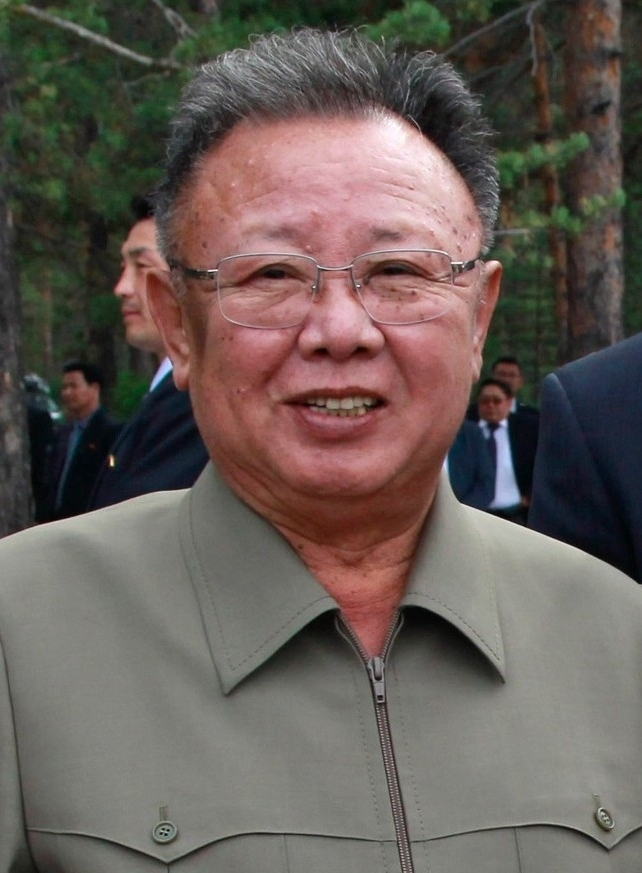
Shin Sang-ok (pictured in 1964) and Kim Jong Il (2011)

Kim Jong Il, the heir apparent to his father Kim Il Sung, the ruler of North Korea, was an admirer of cinema and of South Korean filmmaker Shin Sang-ok. Kim was reported to have a collection of around 15,000 to 20,000 film titles in his possession. Major new releases from around the globe were typically added to his collection shortly after opening in theaters. In 1978, Kim arranged the kidnapping of Shin and his wife, famed actress Choi Eun-hee, intending for them to make propaganda films to gain North Korean cinema external recognition. (Note: Attributed to multiple references:) Shin was imprisoned for attempting to flee North Korea; he was released from jail in 1983 but forced to work in the country's film industry until he and Choi escaped in 1986. Pulgasari was Shin's seventh directorial effort supported by Kim, his fifth of 1985 (following Love, Love, My Love, Salt, The Tale of Shim Chong, and Breakwater), and his last North Korean production. (Note: Pulgasari was not, however, their final collaboration altogether. In the time leading up to his escape, Shin was preparing a film inspired by The Conqueror (1956) for Kim. Takeshi Miyanishi recalled starting to work with Shin to prepare another film immediately after Pulgasari, but decided to back out.)

The script of Pulgasari was written by Kim Seryun (김세륜) in collaboration with Ri Chun-gu (이춘구); the duo were regarded as the best screenwriters in North Korea at the time. The film's story is based around Bulgasari or Pulgasari, a creature from Korean folklore. Furthermore, according to retrospective sources, Pulgasari is a remake of Kim Myeong-je's 1962 South Korean film Bulgasari. The 1962 film—which is now considered lost—was the first-ever Korean film in the kaiju (giant monster) genre, predating Space Monster Wangmagwi and Yongary, Monster from the Deep by five years.

Pulgasari would become a collaboration between the Korean Art Film Studio (Note: Attributed to multiple references:) and Shin Films of North Korea, (Note: Korean film importer SN21 Enterprises claimed in a 1999 trial that Shin Films was a distributor based in Vienna, not one of the film's North Korean production companies.) Toho of Japan, and Beijing Film Studio of China. Special-effects art director Yoshio Suzuki flew to North Korea on April 20, 1985, to attend the first meeting between the film's Japanese and North Korean crews, with the help of an interpreter. The meeting was held at a studio near the Taedong River that produced films about Kim Il Sung and his family. The studio had been set up as a temporary office for Shin's production team while a larger studio was constructed for the film. The Japanese crew developed the Pulgasari suit at Toho from April 28 to late May, with Nobuyuki Yasumaru in charge of modeling it.

=== Conception and pre-production ===
The suit actor Kenpachiro Satsuma stated that Pulgasari was put forward in mid-February 1985, and location scouting started in Pyongyang and Beijing that April. The planning of Pulgasari was credited to Shin, but according to author Paul Fischer, Shin showed no interest in the Japanese kaiju genre and never said who originally conceived the project. Kim Jong Il is said to have been a fan of Toho's Godzilla franchise and saw its 1984 reboot The Return of Godzilla because it was the first in the series to receive a Korean-dubbed release. He reportedly loved the reboot and sought to capitalize on its significant commercial success in Japan by hiring employees from Toho's tokusatsu (Japanese special effects) department to work on North Korea's own monster movie. Shin recalled Kim's suggestion that the monster should resemble a bull.

Twenty-one-year-old Chang Sŏnhŭi, who had previously starred in Love, Love, My Love, played the lead in Pulgasari. Chang was a trainee flight attendant who met Shin at Pyongyang International Airport, and was immediately asked to become a full-time employee at Shin Films. Through his Japanese office, (Note: Nakano recounted how Shin directly approached the team since he was allowed to travel to Japan and some other countries during his abduction. He added that Shin often did so to "figure out the best way to escape" his North Korean overseers.) Shin invited 15 of Toho's special-effects-sector staff, including Satsuma and Nakano, to work on the film. Kim had reportedly praised Satsuma's portrayal of Godzilla in The Return of Godzilla and demanded he play Pulgasari. Satsuma accepted an invitation to work on the film in April 1985, having been deceived into believing it would be a Hollywood production. Satsuma believed that he became the first foreigner to appear in a North Korean film. Many Chinese special effects specialists were hired to collaborate with the Japanese crew to shoot a scene at the Beijing Film Studio.

=== Filming ===
Principal photography took place in Pyongyang from June to August 1985 while special-effects photography was done from September to December. Cho Myŏnghyŏn (조명현) and Pak Sŭngho (박승호) served as the film's main cinematographers. Satsuma later said the film had a budget of ¥200–300 million (equivalent to $2–3 million), making it one of the largest and most-expensive North Korean productions to date. Some sources described its production budget as "unlimited", that it was supported by the Korean People's Army, and featured 13,000 extras. In regards to the extras and military, Satsuma commented:

I think, you can get any North Korean people to appear in a film for free. Shin Sang-ok told me that you can have as many people as you want for the extra scenes. The military would go and fetch the people and they would come. So, it wasn't a matter of money at all in that sense.

According to Shin, Kim Jong Il was "very supportive" of Pulgasari's production despite never being present during filming. For Shin to create the film, Kim ordered the construction of Munsu Studio, an immense complex described by Satsuma as a "state of the art film studio". The facility featured a four-story building covering approximately 20,000 pyeong (66,000 square meters (710,000 sq ft)), four studios, six screening rooms, six recording studios, and around 300 waiting rooms and other spaces to store art equipment. Munsu Studio was still under construction when it was used for special effects photography.

During an interview with author Johannes Schönherr, Satsuma said Shin did not indicate that he had been kidnapped and was "extremely busy and ... often absent". Furthermore, Fischer claimed that Satsuma only spoke to Shin once during production and asked him whether he would ever return to South Korea, to which Shin replied: "It would be too complicated, politically, to go back". According to Satsuma and some South Korean reports, Chong Gon-jo substituted for Shin towards the end of filming. (Note: Attributed to multiple references:)

==== Special effects ====
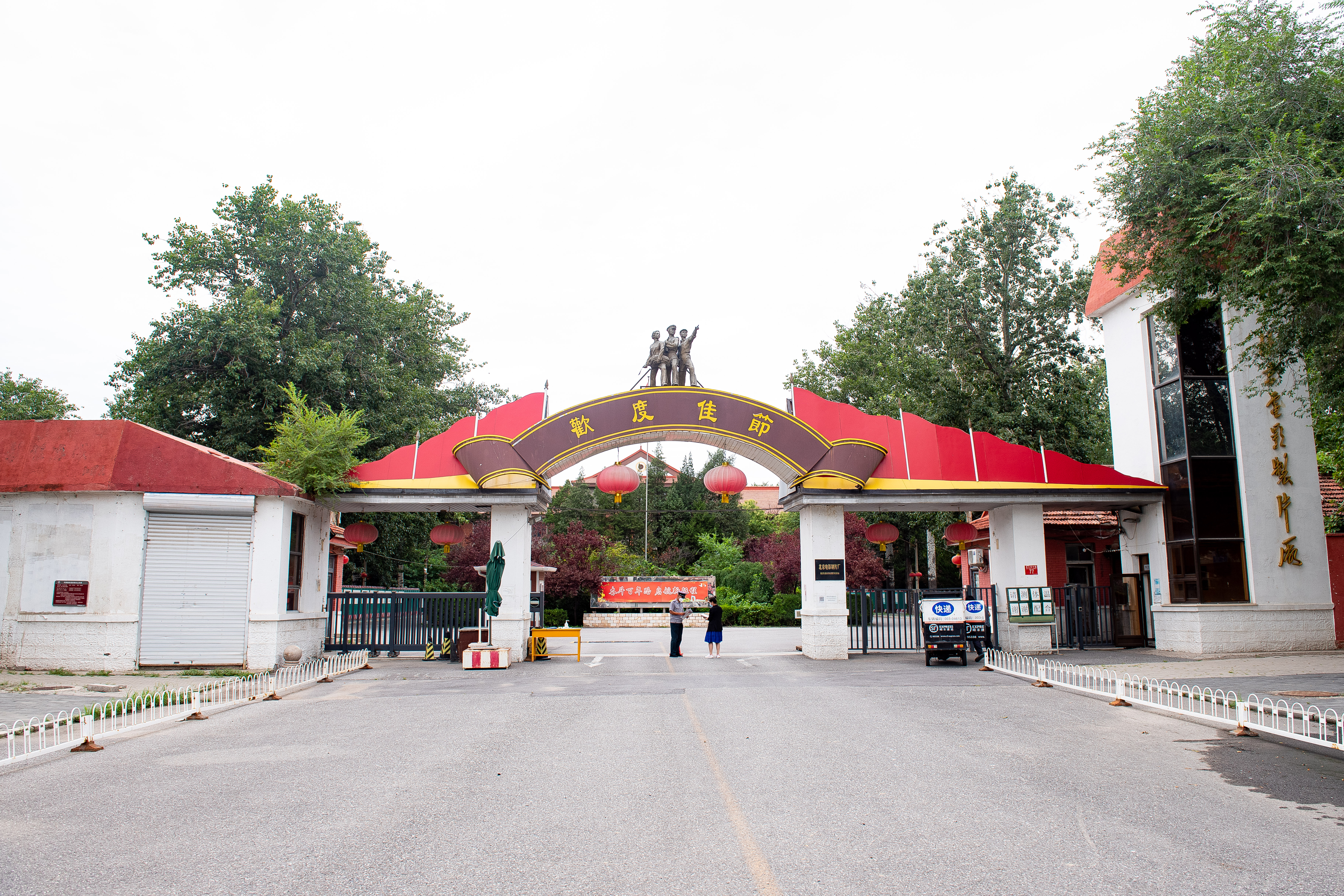
The Beijing Film Studio in China (pictured in 2022) where the scene of Pulgasari destroying the king's palace was filmed

Shortly before departing Japan in mid-September 1985, the Japanese crew filmed footage depicting Pulgasari wandering around a miniature village in Studio 9 at Toho Studios, but this footage was omitted from the film's final cut. Satsuma and an assistant director flew from Tokyo to Beijing via Shanghai on China Airlines Flight 930 on September 11, 1985. On September 14, they began working at Beijing Film Studio to prepare the miniature of the king's palace and set for the film's climax, which the Chinese crew had already been creating. Satsuma noted that the Chinese team based the set on the Forbidden City complex in Beijing, and the two special effects crews referred to it as the Hall of Supreme Harmony during production. Conflict between the two crews soon arose; the Chinese believed the Japanese team "just walked in and started damaging the [Hall of Supreme Harmony] set that we put our heart and soul into building for three months". Satsuma mentioned he was "impressed that the Chinese government could allow such an ambitious filming, even if it was just a movie" when talking about the destruction of the palace in the Pulgasari suit for the film.

After spending two weeks shooting in Beijing, the Toho team traveled to Pyongyang to complete the two months of overseas special effects photography. According to Satsuma, upon arrival in North Korea, their passports were confiscated "for our own safety". He and the other Japanese were kept for one-and-a-half months as guests at Kim Jong Il's villa, where each of them had a large, well-ventilated room with a bed, a television, a bookshelf, and a radio. One of the Japanese employees said their rooms were bugged; this was allegedly evident when one of them, while alone in his room, was talking to himself about how he missed drinking Japanese beer, only to discover the next day it had been added to his refrigerator. According to Satsuma, Kim often visited the villa but seemingly refused to meet the Japanese guests and avoided them. Nakano, however, claimed that Kim personally took him to see his international film collection; he also described how Kim was "not really a kaiju fan; he [was] a movie fan. But he did know a lot about kaiju."

On-site filming in North Korea became challenging for the special effects team, due in part to electrical constraints, a power outage, and equipment theft. Satsuma and Eiichi Asada noted that the windows in Shin's studio had no glass, with the former adding that this environment "felt like mid-winter". They also filmed some scenes on a hill behind the Korean Art Film Studio rather than inside that facility.

=== Post-production ===
Post-production partly took place in Japan and concluded in December 1985. Miyanishi continued working on the film in North Korea for over a month after the rest of the Toho crew returned to Japan. Kim Ryŏnsun (김련순) edited the film and Sŏ Chŏnggŏn (서정건) composed the score. Kim Jong Il was reportedly reluctant for Shin to be acknowledged as the director. Accordingly, only the North Korean staff was credited within the film; Chong received sole directorial credit. (Note: Attributed to multiple references:)

== Release ==
=== Distribution ===
An English-language poster published in the 1994 edition of Kenpachiro Satsuma's book The North Korea that Godzilla Saw

Pulgasari was intended to receive an international release. Satsuma noted that it was lauded upon its first screening at Toho Studios in January 1986. On February 16, Shin, under the supervision of North Korean bodyguards, flew to Berlin to offer the film to several Western film distributors at the 36th Berlin International Film Festival. The film's 1995 Japanese flyer stated an unidentified major enterprise had acquired Pulgasari for Japanese distribution. Satsuma said Shin agreed with a Japanese company representing North Korea and an Osaka-based distributor to release the film in Japan on home video and in theaters. As many retrospective sources have stated, the film was, however, banned when Shin and Choi escaped their North Korean supervisors in Vienna in March 1986, and subsequently fled to the United States. (Note: Attributed to multiple references:)

Sources differ on whether Pulgasari was ever distributed in North Korea. According to a listing on the Information Center on North Korea's website, the North Korean newspaper Minju Joson reported on February 28, 1986, that the film had been released. However, some suggest that the film has never been shown theatrically there, and Fischer contends that it was released in North Korea a few weeks after Shin's escape and achieved financial success. According to Fischer, two North Korean defectors said it was exceedingly popular in North Korean theaters, so much that there were casualties because of large and overly enthusiastic crowds. Michihiro Amano of the Japanese website Tocana writes the film was prepared for release to celebrate Kim Il Sung's birthday (occurring on April 15). American home video distributor ADV Films claimed that Pulgasari was "banned by the North Korean government for its anti-communism leanings". Steven Chung explains in his 2014 book Split Screen Korea: Shin Sang-ok and Postwar Cinema that "it is not clear whether the film was released publicly in North Korea ... though there is some indication that it was screened for Kim Jong Il and other cultural and news officials."

==== Japan ====
Satsuma attributed the film's eventual Japanese release to Kim Jong Il assuming the role of North Korea's Supreme Leader in 1994. On January 21, 1995, the Japanese home video distributor Twin released Pulgasari on VHS in Japan; according to its flyer, this release was the film's first public distribution in any format. The VHS copy of the film could only be purchased by mail order per the distribution agreement. Although Twin's president Yoshimitsu Yoshitsuru claimed to have acquired permission from Shin for the release, Kinema Junpo and Amano later said this release was piracy. The film's official debut took place in Tokyo at the Kineca Ōmori theater on July 4, 1998; it remained playing there until September due to high demand. Later that year, Raging Thunder released it in several other Japanese cinemas and on home video, with optional Japanese subtitles or dubbing.

==== South Korea ====
In November 1998, Munhwa Broadcasting Corporation (MBC) announced it would broadcast Pulgasari on its television channel in 1999. Shin later accused MBC of copyright infringement, filed a lawsuit against it, and petitioned for a ban on broadcasting Pulgasari and Love, Love, My Love in South Korea. The following year, Judge Shin Jeong-chi of the Seoul High Court dismissed Shin's request to ban the film in two trials, and concluded that although Shin held the moral rights to the films, the North Korean production company owned the broadcasting rights.

Park Jie-won of the Ministry of Culture, Sports and Tourism said in May 2000 that Pulgasari had been reviewed to confirm it does not contain any Juche and approved for release in South Korea as part of a cultural exchange agreement for the June 15th North–South Joint Declaration. On July 22 that same year, Pulgasari became the first North Korean film to be distributed in South Korean theaters. (Note: Attributed to multiple references:) The same month, Sisa Journal reported its release was attracting controversy on whether films from North Korea should be handled as foreign or domestic distributions, and that it was being considered for classification as a domestic film, which would lead to it benefitting from the South Korean screen quota system. Starmax later distributed the film on home video in August 2000.

Pulgasari was screened at the 22nd Bucheon International Fantastic Film Festival in July 2018. On June 5 of the following year, it opened the seventh Muju Film Festival.

==== Other territories ====
In 2001, A.D. Vision distributed Pulgasari on VHS in the United States through its subsidiary Rubbersuit Productions. The film had its New York premiere in 2006 as part of Columbia University's Godzilla film festival. It later received several additional screenings in the US, the United Kingdom, and Canada; and was shown in Paris at the Jeu de Paume museum in April 2015. The film has also become available for viewing on YouTube. (Note: Attributed to multiple references:)

=== Box office ===
The film achieved several Japanese box-office records, attracting around 18,000 attendees during its theatrical run at Kineca Ōmori. In 2018, Ju Seong-cheol of Cine21 stated Pulgasari outperformed TriStar's Godzilla (1998) in Japan and held the record for the highest-grossing North Korean film of all time.

In South Korea, Pulgasari opened in 50 theaters, and was a box-office bomb, drawing under 1,000 theatergoers. Due to its low number of initial attendees, many theaters decided to remove the film within the first week of its release. Johannes Schönherr cited reasonings by contemporaneous publications on its failure in South Korea, including the unpopularity of Japanese kaiju films there and the lack of interest from adolescents in low-budget special effects.

== Reception ==
=== Critical response ===
Japanese critics widely praised Pulgasari. Jun Edoki, one of the film's main advocates, referred to it as "one of the greatest monster movie masterpieces in history, something that neither Hollywood nor Japan can ever replicate". According to the Choson Sinbo, Japanese reviewers positively compared Pulgasari to Godzilla (1998) at the time, saying Pulgasari is not "sophisticated" like Godzilla and "reminds the viewers of Japanese monster movies of their good old days". Similarly, Lee Dong-jin of the South Korean newspaper The Chosun Ilbo compared Pulgasari's technical prowess to Godzilla (1998); he wrote Pulgasari "feels a bit old, but is a fun work that cutely mixes drama and spectacle".

Reviewing the film's initial American video release, Film Threat noted its background and said it should have been parodied in an episode of Mystery Science Theater 3000.

=== Participants' response ===
Satsuma said he adored Pulgasari and that he fondly remembered performing in it, deeming it to be the "most memorable work in [his] long acting career". He later authored a book titled The North Korea that Godzilla Saw, which details his experiences of working on the film. He told Choson Sinbo in 1998 his favorite scene in the film was the one in which the titular monster is caged and set ablaze, and that he wanted to return to North Korea to work on a sequel. The Daily Telegraph also said Satsuma considered the film to be better than Godzilla (1998).

In 2005, Shin told The New Yorker he believed the film's special effects were outdated. According to Fischer, Kim Jong Il considered Pulgasari to be a masterpiece. Likewise, Miyanishi called it a "good movie" and considered it among the best films he had worked on.

=== Interpretations ===
According to Johannes Schönherr, there has been some speculation Shin included a hidden message in Pulgasari. The film's titular monster is often interpreted as a metaphor for Kim Il Sung betraying a revolution for his own purposes and as a plea to the North Korean people to rise against the Kim regime. Some believe this is represented by Pulgasari demanding his subjects feed him more iron, even after the monarchy has been defeated, leading to the workers rebelling against and defeating their savior. Shin rejected interpretations that the film contains a message on North Korea's contemporaneous class conflict. In his late life, he explained that Pulgasari was rather meant as a plea for pacifism, a warning against nuclear war. A 2019 article quoted Shin saying: "It was a pure monster film, I didn't put any ideology in it".

== Remake ==
In 1995, under the alias Simon Sheen, Shin worked on an American remake of Pulgasari. Galgameth (released in 1996), which was directed by Sean McNamara and written by Michael Angeli, tells the story of a young prince who is aided by a benevolent monster, reclaiming his deceased father's medieval kingdom. Shin said Galgameth, along with The Gardener (1998), "caused [him] a big financial loss". Fischer described Galgameth as "a film so bad that it makes Pulgasari look good".

== Legacy ==
Pulgasari is now considered a cult classic. Modern sources have stated it has become the most widely-seen North Korean movie worldwide and Shin's best-known film, partly due to public interest in his abduction by North Korea. (Note: Attributed to multiple references:) Fischer said the film "defined [Shin's] career and changed his life". It has, however, fallen into obscurity in South Korea.

Since its US premiere in 2001, Western reviewers and kaiju fans have frequently mocked the film, according to Schönherr. In a 2015 retrospective, Fischer described it as Shin's worst film. A 2016 review on Screen Anarchy called it propaganda, and only praised Shin's efforts and the monster's depiction. In 2014, Simon Fowler of The Guardian ranked it the third-best North Korean film ever made but noted: "it's [easy] to get lost in the ridiculousness of it all". Jonathan Ross said Pulgasari was among the few North Korean films he had seen, and described it as a "peculiar but enjoyably campy kaiju flick". In 2024, Vulture called it "quite bad as a film"; saying its behind-the-scenes story is more fascinating than the film itself. A 2024 retrospective by Mattie Lucas suggested that Pulgasari was more evocative of The Golem: How He Came into the World (1920) than the Godzilla series, which it is commonly compared to. She also believed it was a worthy homage to the kaiju genre, despite noting that it may contain controversial ideology.

In 2018, filmmaker Anna Broinowski recalled that after watching Pulgasari she became interested in North Korean cinema, ultimately leading her to shoot a documentary partly in North Korea titled Aim High in Creation (2013). Gorillaz referenced the film in their 2016 short story "The Book of Russel", in which virtual band member Russel is mistaken for Pulgasari and apprehended in Pyongyang.

== See also ==
- Daimajin – a 1966 Japanese film trilogy with similar plot elements
