= Runaway (1984 North Korean film) =

- Title screen
- Hangul: 탈출기
- RR: Talchulgi
- MR: T'alch'ulgi
- IPA: [tʰa̠ɭt͡ɕʰuɭɡi]
- Directed by: Shin Sang-ok
- Screenplay by: Kim Hui Bong
- Based on: Runaway by Chae Seo-hae
- Produced by: Ri Hyon Su; Jong Yong Son
- Starring: Choe Chang Su; Choi Eun-hee
- Cinematography: Pak Kwan Yong; Hwang Ryong Chol
- Edited by: Kim Ryon Sun
- Music by: ABBA (cover songs of); Kim Ji Hon (original music)
- Production company: Shin Film
- Release date: 1984 (North Korea)
- Running time: 105 minutes
- Country: North Korea
- Language: Korean

Runaway (Korean: 탈출기; pronounced [tʰa̠ɭt͡ɕʰuɭɡi]) is a 1984 North Korean melodrama film directed by Shin Sang-ok. It was the second film in North Korea by South Korea's Shin after he and his wife Choi Eun-hee had been abducted there. Runaway stars Choe Chang Su as the protagonist and Choi as his wife.

Runaway is based on a short story of the same name set in the 1920s and written by Chae Seo-hae. The protagonist, Song Ryul has to return to the countryside to see his ill father. After his cousin conspires with the Japanese occupiers to sell their crop, Song Ryul is forced to emigrate to Kando (Jiandao) in Manchuria. His family faces numerous adversities there and after a row with a local pharmacist, he is imprisoned. The prison is raided by Kim Il Sung and his guerrillas, who free the inmates, who then take revenge on the Japanese by blowing up a railway.

A real train was filled with explosives and exploded for the finale after Shin had jokingly asked for one. Shin considered the scene a pinnacle of his career, and it became a memorable one in the history of North Korean cinema. Shin had to balance his artistic desires with the propaganda goals of North Korea. The result is very much like other North Korean films, but also reminiscent of Shin's previous films he had made to impress South Korean President Park Chung Hee in the 1960s.

== Plot ==
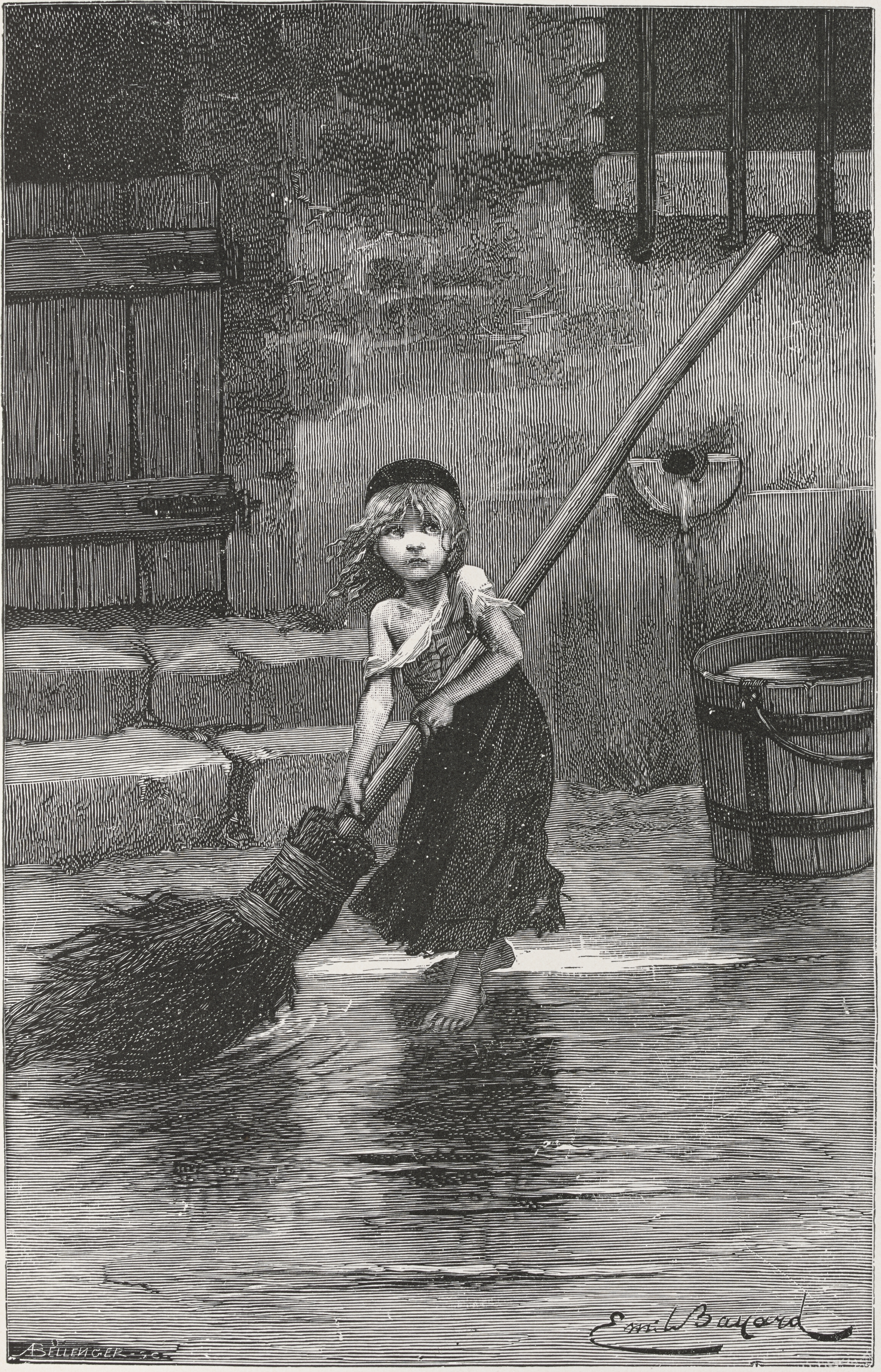
Runaway opens with a Les Misérables quote: "So long as ignorance and misery remain on Earth, books like this cannot be useless..."

Runaway is based on a short story of the same name written by Chae Seo-hae in 1924.

The film opens with a quote from Victor Hugo's Les Misérables: "So long as ignorance and misery remain on Earth, books like this cannot be useless..." The opener was highly unorthodox for a North Korean film, since North Korean works of culture habitually only referenced texts written by the leader Kim Il Sung, and certainly not of foreigners. Footage of Paris and Tokyo is seen in the film.

The film is set in the 1920s in Korea under Japanese occupation. Song Ryul (played by Choe Sang-soo) is a peasant studying in Seoul when he hears the news that his father is ill and he has to return to the countryside. His richer cousin gives him a plot of land to farm on. Song, his wife (played by Choi Eun-hee), and his parents tend to the land, but right before harvest the cousin sells the land and its crop to the Japanese. Song's father voices his opposition but is killed by the police. Song and his family are ruined and they have to move to Kando (Jiandao) in Manchuria. The area has a reputation for being a lawless territory. The life of Song's family there is a "numbing catalog of their difficulties": being robbed, exploited, and cheated. Song's mother is attacked by a pack of rabid dogs owned by a businessman in "a horrific scene", and has to buy medicine. The local pharmacist, however, refuses to sell it without being paid immediately. Song is enraged and smashes the pharmacy with an axe and sets it on fire. He is arrested and sent to prison by train. The prison is however attacked by Kim Il Sung and his guerrillas who free the inmates. Song joins them in their fight against the Japanese occupiers. He partakes in an operation to blow up the train tracks he was transported to prison on and a Japanese army train.

== Production ==
The climax of the film features an exploding and derailing train. Shin was unable to figure out how to shoot the scene with either scale models or other special effects, so he jokingly asked if Kim Jong Il could supply him with a real train instead. To Shin's surprise, his request was met without delay. The scene was thus shot with a real train loaded with live explosives. For Shin, this meant that there was no room for error, as the scene could not be shot again. The shooting was successful, and the result is "one of North Korean cinema's iconic images." Shin himself later called it the high point of his entire career, admitting that such a spectacle "is only possible in North Korea". Overall, he also thought of Runaway as the best out of his films made in North Korea, a statement that he made often. Of its novelty, he said: "I introduced words like 'love' in North Korean film".

The film uses visual techniques such as slow-motion freeze frames. The scene in which Song Ryul smashes the local pharmacy is shot in slow motion and the movie ends with the shot of the exploding train being frozen as the credits start to roll. The final scene also contains a voice-over explaining Song's sudden conversion to communism. Runaway was Shin's second North Korean film, made after Shin had completed An Emissary of No Return, also in 1984. Shin's next film made in the North would be Salt, also set in Kando during the anti-Japanese struggle.

== Soundtrack ==
The soundtrack of Runaway features cover versions of songs by ABBA. Following the release of the film, North Korean youths adopted these songs and organized illegal parties.

== Reception ==
On the one hand, Runaway conforms to well to the "juche Socialist realist standard" of North Korean film. The conflict between the rich and the poor that serves as the backdrop of the story in particular is archetypal. Shin himself thought of the original short story as "a point of origin" of communism in Korea, although by and large the relationship with literature from that period and North Korea's official ideology is "at best problematic". On the other hand, Runaway retains many characteristics from Shin's early melodrama films made in the 1960s while he was still in South Korea which he used to impress the country's president Park Chung Hee. Indeed, both North and South Korean cinema shared a preoccupation with realism at the time, and in both political contexts, an authoritarian regime was hungry for the success of the cinematic arts. Thus according to Steven Chung, a "tension between cinematic pleasure and political edification" is evident in Runaway. The result is a nationalistic drama film "in the usual propagandist mold".

Leonid Petrov calls it Shin's "finest film". Choi Eun-hee's acting in particular is strong in the powerful supporting role of the wife of Song Ryul. Kim Il Sung himself praised the film for its powerful drama.

Thematically, Runaway is very much like classic North Korean films, such as The Flower Girl and Sea of Blood: it is propaganda but in the classic mode of portraying the struggles of everyday people instead of attributing all good things to the deeds of Kim Il Sung. Shin was awarded the prize for best director at a film festival in Prague in 1984.

A retrospective of Shin's filmography was held at the Busan International Film Festival in 2001. The screening was initially meant to include two of his films made in North Korea: Runaway and Salt. The public prosecutor of South Korea, however, forbade the screening just one day before Runaway was to be shown to guests, on the basis of the National Security Act. This forced the organizers to show the film as a private screening instead of their original intention of letting the general public watch it.

== See also ==
- Abduction of Shin Sang-ok and Choi Eun-hee
- Cinema of North Korea
- Juche
- List of North Korean films
- North Korean literature
- Propaganda in North Korea
