= The Tale of Shim Chong (film) =

- Hangul: 심청전
- Hanja: 沈淸傳
- RR: Sim Cheongjeon
- MR: Sim Ch'ŏngjŏn
- Directed by: Shin Sang-ok
- Based on: The Tale of Sim Chong
- Produced by: Choi Eun-hee; Shin Sang-ok
- Starring: Choi Eun-hee
- Production company: Bavaria Film Studios
- Release date: 1985 (North Korea)
- Running time: 100 minutes
- Country: North Korea
- Language: Korean

The Tale of Shim Chong (Korean: 심청전) is a 1985 North Korean musical film directed by Shin Sang-ok.

It is based on the traditional story of the same name. The story centers on Shim Chong, the daughter of a poor blind farmer. The peasant signs a deal with a monk to deliver 300 sacks of rice in return of his sight, but is unable to deliver the goods. Shim Chong agrees to be sacrificed to the God of the Sea on behalf of sailors who wish to appease the deity. She is thrown into the sea and meets the god, who praises her for her filial piety. Shim Chong returns to the surface inside a giant orchid that fishermen take to the king of the land. The king falls in love with her and helps her find her desperate father who has gone missing by organizing a feast for all the blind people in the kingdom.

The Tale of Shim Chong was made when Shin and his wife Choi Eun-hee, who plays the part of Shim Chong's mother, were abducted by North Korea. The two were allowed to complete the filming of the underwater sequences of the film at the Bavaria Film Studios in Munich, West Germany. The negatives of the film went missing for some time, before Shin re-discovered them in Pyongyang.

The Tale of Shim Chong has been likened to the work of Busby Berkeley.

== Plot ==
Shim Chong is the daughter of a poor, blind farmer whose wife has passed away. Visiting a temple, her father is informed by a monk that his blindness can be cured with 300 sacks of rice. The farmer agrees to supply the sacks, but soon realizes that he is not able to.

Meanwhile, a group of sailors lament that they have angered the God of the Sea. The only way to appease the god is to sacrifice a young girl. Shim Chong agrees to be the sacrificial offering if the sailors provide the sacks of rice her father is missing and some money. Once the farmer finds out about this deal he unsuccessfully tries to stop Shim Chong.

Shim Chong is taken to the sea in the sailors' ship and thrown overboard. The seas immediately calm. Shim Chong sinks to the bottom of the sea and meets the God of the Sea. The god, who had been expecting her, commends her for her devotion. In the underwater realm, Shim Chong also reunites with her deceased mother.

Shim Chong leaves the world of the God of the Sea by floating to the surface inside a giant orchid. A group of fishermen discover the orchid and take it to the king who rules the land. Shim Chong emerges from the orchid and the king falls in love with her. Shim Chong, however, can only think about her father who has gone missing. It turns out he had found a new woman, but the woman cheats her and takes all of the money that Shim Chong had asked from the sailors.

The king helps Shim Chong find her father by organizing a feast for all blind people in his kingdom. When Shim Chong recognizes her father at the feast, he miraculously regains his eyesight.

== Cast ==
Choi Eun-hee acts the part of Shim Chong's mother.

== Themes ==
The theme is of suffering and filial piety.

== Production ==
The Tale of Shim Chong was directed by Shin Sang-ok while he and his wife Choi Eun-hee were abducted to North Korea. It is in the genre of a musical film. The story is based on an ancient Korean folk tale The Tale of Sim Chong about a princess of a realm at the bottom of the sea. Shin had already made a film based on the story in 1972 in South Korea.

The underwater world is populated by dancers in exotic outfits. Although they are masked, their way of dancing gives away the fact that they are Western actors. This otherworldly realm is contrasted with the kingdom on dry land, which is inhabited by people acted by Koreans.

With the permission of Kim Jong Il, Shin and Choi traveled to the Bavaria Film Studios in Munich, West Germany, where they shot the underwater sequences of the film. Shin was helped in special effects by the team that made the film The NeverEnding Story. Shin and Choi's every move in Munich was followed by seven North Korean bodyguards. According to Johannes Schönherr, the author of North Korean Cinema: A History, it would have been comparatively easier for the pair to escape in Munich, but Shin and Choi instead returned to North Korea after the filming was complete. The pair instead escaped from their abductors while in Vienna in 1985, the same year The Tale of Shim Chong and Shin's next film Salt were released.

Shin sent the negatives of The Tale of Shim Chong to Kim Guh-wha, a Shin Film representative in Hong Kong to add Chinese subtitles. Kim was the man whom, as Shin later discovered, had handed him over to North Korean agents in Hong Kong in 1978. The negatives went missing at some point. Shin rediscovered the negatives when he visited Kim Jong Il's film archives in Pyongyang.

== Critical response ==
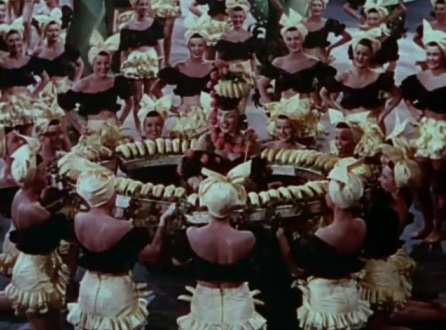
The Gang's All Here (1943) choreographed by Busby Berkeley

Paul Fischer, the author of A Kim Jong Il Production likens it with the work of Busby Berkeley, calling it "an extravagant musical ... with fantasy creatures, expensive costumes, and underwater scenes".

== See also ==
- Abduction of Shin Sang-ok and Choi Eun-hee
- Cinema of North Korea
- Human sacrifice
- List of North Korean films
- Simcheongga – pansori (traditional musical storytelling) of the same story
