= Seong Chun-hyang =

- Poster of Seong Chun-hyang
- Hangul: 성춘향
- Lit.: Seong Chun-hyang
- RR: Seong Chunhyang
- MR: Sŏng Ch'unhyang
- Directed by: Shin Sang-ok
- Screenplay by: Im Hee-jae
- Based on: Chunhyangjeon
- Produced by: Shin Sang-ok
- Starring: Choi Eun-hee; Kim Jin-kyu
- Cinematography: Lee Hyeong-pyo
- Edited by: Kim Young-hee
- Music by: Jeong Yun-ju
- Production company: Shin Films
- Distributed by: Seoul Film Corporation
- Release date: 1961
- Running time: 107 minutes 144 minutes (restored version)
- Country: South Korea
- Language: Korean
- Box office: $17,715

Seong Chun-hyang (Korean: 성춘향) is a 1961 South Korean romantic drama film directed by Shin Sang-ok. It is a film adaptation of the pansori folktale of Chunhyangga.

== Plot ==
On Dano Day, Namwon magistrate Lee Do-ryeong (Kim Jin-kyu) visits Gwanghallu Pavilion and sees Chun-hyang (Choi Eun-hee) swinging. He orders his servant Bang-ja (Heo Jang-gang) to summon her, but Chun-hyang, whose mother Wol-mae (Han Eun-jin) is a former gisaeng and whose late father was a high-ranking official, refuses. Instead of following her mother’s profession, she devotes herself to reading, painting, and calligraphy.

That night, Lee visits Chun-hyang’s home and swears before Wol-mae that he will take her as his wife. The two spend their first night together and enjoy a brief period of happiness as newlyweds. Soon after, however, Lee must leave Namwon to accompany his father, who has been reassigned to a new post in Hanyang. Though Chun-hyang hopes to join him, Lee departs alone after receiving a harsh rebuke from his father for visiting a gisaeng house. He promises to return.

In Lee's absence, Byun Hak-do (Lee Ye-chun) is appointed as the new magistrate. Captivated by Chun-hyang’s beauty, he orders her to come to him. She refuses, declaring that though she is the daughter of a gisaeng, she will not dishonour herself. Enraged, Byun has her imprisoned, where she endures severe hardships.

Meanwhile, Lee passes the civil service examination with the highest score and is secretly appointed as a royal inspector. Disguised as a beggar, he returns to Namwon and secretly meets Wol-mae. When he encounters Chun-hyang in prison, she remains steadfast, even urging Wol-mae and her maid Hyang-dan (Do Geum-bong) to show him kindness despite her own suffering.

At Byun Hak-do's birthday celebration, Chun-hyang is brought out to be executed for her continued defiance. At the last moment, Lee reveals himself as the secret royal inspector. He exposes Byun's corruption, orders his dismissal, and rescues Chun-hyang, reuniting with her in triumph.

== Cast ==
- Choi Eun-hee as Chun-hyang
- Kim Jin-kyu as Lee Do-ryeong
- Han Eun-jin as Wol-mae
- Lee Ye-chun as Byun Hak-do
- Heo Jang-gan as Bang-ja
- Do Geum-bong Hyang-dan

== Production ==
Seong Chun-hyang and Chunhyangjeon directed by Hong Seong-gi were produced around the same time.

This concurrent production led to controversy over excessive competition. Director Shin Sang-ok, who began production first, petitioned the Korean Film Producers Association (KOFIA), citing its regulation that “if one-third of the content is the same, production is not permitted.” Although the Korean Film Council recognized Shin’s prior application, Chunhyangjeon proceeded with the support of Chairman Cho Yong-jin, who was involved in its production. As a result, the Youngjae Association split into factions, with the new faction supporting Seong Chun-hyang and the old faction backing Chunhyangjeon.

During this period, an incident occurred in which an unknown assailant broke into the Shin Films office, damaged furniture, assaulted an employee, and fled. The investigation suggested the attack was related to the competition between the two film companies.

== Reception ==
=== Box office ===
Seong Chun-hyang drew 350,000 spectators in Seoul alone.

The film was exported to Japan under a contract with a British theater, earning a royalty of $5,000, and was released in six major Japanese cities.

=== Critical response ===
While early predictions favoured Chunhyangjeon, Seong Chun-hyang achieved commercial and critical success. The competition with Chunhyangjeon also highlighted the technical and artistic achievement of Seong Chun-hyang, as critics and audiences noted its superior use of color, cinematography, and CinemaScope compared to its rival.

Shot on Kodak film and printed at the Toyo Development Company in Japan, Seong Chun-hyang was praised for its vivid, dazzling, and authentic colors, as well as its rich mise-en-scène that fully utilized CinemaScope. Director Shin Sang-ok’s use of witty dialogue and a blend of comedic and melodramatic elements maintains the film’s tempo and pacing.

Although the film does not reinterpret the classic Chunhyangjeon, Shin’s strategy of retelling a familiar story in a popular cinematic style was highly successful.

=== Awards ===
Name of the award ceremony, year presented, category, nominee of the award, and the result of the nomination
Award	Year	Category	Nominee/Work	Result	Ref.
Buil Film Awards	1961	Best Actor	Kim Jin-kyu	Won	

== Legacy ==
Seong Chun-hyang is considered as one of South Korea’s first colour CinemaScope films. The rivalry between Seong Chun-hyang and Chunhyangjeon extended beyond production to include the lead actresses – Choi Eun-hee (in her 30s) and Kim Ji-mee (in her 20s) – and directors Shin Sang-ok and Hong Seong-gi.

The film was digitally restored by the Korean Film Archive (KOFA) over two years, beginning in 2017. The original negative was used as the basis for restoration, supplemented by scenes only available in existing prints. The restored version runs 144 minutes and preserves the film as closely as possible to its original release. Seong Chun-hyang is recognized as a landmark in Korean cinema for pioneering colour CinemaScope techniques and popularizing a classic story in a commercially successful style.
