= Salt (1985 film) =

- Promotional poster
- Hangul: 소금
- RR: Sogeum
- MR: Sogŭm
- IPA: /sʰo̞ɡɯm/
- Directed by: Shin Sang-ok
- Based on: Salt by Kang Kyeong-ae
- Starring: Choi Eun-hee
- Production company: Shin Film
- Release date: 1985 (North Korea)
- Running time: 96 minutes
- Country: North Korea
- Language: Korean

Salt (Korean: 소금, Korean pronunciation: [sʰo̞ɡɯm]) is a 1985 North Korean tragedy film directed by Shin Sang-ok. It is the third of Shin's North Korean films after he and his wife Choi Eun-hee were abducted and brought to the country against their will. Choi stars in Salt as an unnamed mother who disapproves of her son after he runs away with guerrillas, but eventually comes to see them as fighting for a just cause. The film is set in 1930s Kando (Jiandao) where ethnic Koreans are persecuted by the Chinese and Japanese.

The film employed a new virtue in North Korean cinema of short and condensed stories instead of multi-part epics. Unusual for a North Korean film, it was favorably reviewed by foreign critics. Choi's performance in particular is praised for realism. She was awarded the Best Actress prize at the 14th Moscow International Film Festival in 1985 for her role.

== Plot ==
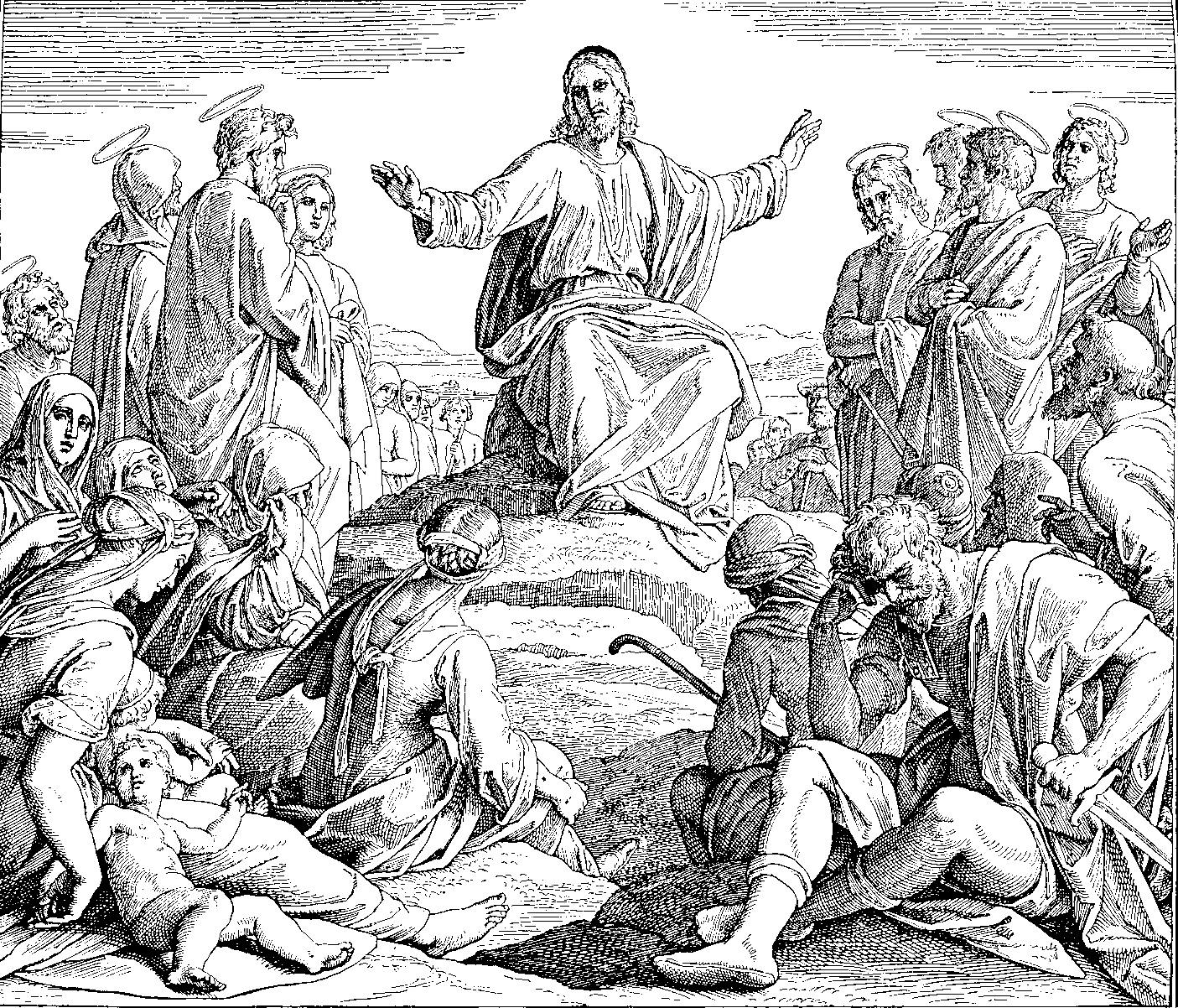
The film opens with "You are the salt of the earth. But if the salt loses its saltiness, how can it be made salty again?" (Matthew 5:13)

The film opens with a quote from the Bible (for the first time in the history of North Korean cinema where only quotations from Kim Il Sung were typical): "You are the salt of the earth. But if the salt loses its saltiness, how can it be made salty again?" (Matthew 5:13).

The setting of the film is Kando (Jiandao) in the 1930s, torn apart by ethnic conflict in which the Koreans are "literally caught in the crossfire" of Japanese occupiers, Chinese bandits, and communist guerrillas. The local policing force is supposed to protect the peasants, but in truth only works when the interests of the Japanese occupiers are at stake.

The protagonist is an anonymous mother whose husband is killed by bandits. Her son Pong Shik runs off with a band of guerrillas, and her other children fall ill and are denied care by a doctor. The youngest of her sons was born after she was raped by a Chinese landlord, in a scene described as the darkest in the film. After a failed abortion attempt, the mother tries to suffocate the unwanted child before finally deciding to hang herself. However, her neighbor comes to her rescue, cutting the noose just as she is about to breathe her last. The neighbor, although poor, gives the mother's family some salt and suggests it as an opportunity to help alleviate her plight.

At the end of the film, the mother carries an expensive sack of salt on a mountain trail with other smugglers. They are attacked by bandits, who in turn are chased away by the communist guerrillas. The guerrillas vow to protect the common people and the mother realizes that her son did not run away from his family with bad intent, but was in fact a hero. She is now determined to find her son and follow the guerrillas.

== Production ==
Shin directed Salt in 1985, following his second North Korean film, Runaway (1984). Like Runway, Salt was produced by Shin's North Korean company Shin Film. Salt was released in 1985, the same year that he directed Pulgasari and saw the release of his film The Tale of Shim Chong.

Salt is based on a 1934 novel of the same name by Kang Kyeong-ae set in Kando (Jiandao). Like Runaway, Salt is a film in the "juche Socialist realist standard" of North Korean film. In Salt, however, the suffering of the poor people is even more ruthlessly portrayed. In a socialist realist fashion, the landowning and rich classes are displayed as devoid of morals, with the landowner committing rape and the doctor refusing care to the rape victim. The poor, in turn, are generous and their relations filled with solidarity. Another dimension of conflict is between the Koreans, portrayed as innocent, and the Chinese. Like Runaway, the film embodies a tension between Shin's desire for what is good cinema and the political motives it had to serve.

Choi Eun-hee stars in the film as the unnamed mother. Choi's character speaks in the dialect of the northern part of the country, instead of the usual Pyongyang dialect, which broke the customs of North Korean cinema. Choi is often on camera in "patient", even "torturous" shots. Her performance was "unprecedented in North Korean cinema history for its naturalism and nuance". Anna Broinowski goes so far as to say that "the suffering [of Choi] depicted on screen was real". A tragedy in the social realist genre, Salt is "full of sex and eroticism". It includes a scene of Choi breastfeeding with frontal nudity, as well as a rape scene. A North Korean defector has testified to remembering going to watch the film several times with friends for the rape scene that exposes the mother's milky thigh "just to see that brief white flash of flesh".

In addition to Shin's contribution as the director, the success of Salt is also attributable to a conscious change of policy in North Korean film making. While typically North Korean films were bland multi-part productions with up to 20 films in a series, it was decided that films should be more condensed, realistic, and lyrical; the way Salt ended up being made.

== Reception ==
Foreign critics reviewed the film favorably, which was unusual for a North Korean film. Leonid Petrov calls it a "masterpiece". Johannes Schönherr, author of North Korean Cinema: A History writes: "Salt [is] an extraordinary piece of cinema. It feels like 1970 exploitation meeting socialist-realist art".

Shin and Choi were allowed to travel to the 14th Moscow International Film Festival in 1985, where Choi won the Best Actress award for her role. It is the highest honor a North Korean film has received to date. Kim Il Sung praised the film for its "commitment to realism". Many North Korean defectors have reportedly approached Choi, thanking her for her role in Salt.

Salt was included in a retrospective of Shin's filmography at the Busan International Film Festival in South Korea 2001. A South Korean catalog of female directors mistakenly attributes the film's direction to Choi, who however had already stopped directing when the film was made and was focusing on acting.

== See also ==
- Abduction of Shin Sang-ok and Choi Eun-hee
- Exploitation film
- Juche
- List of North Korean films
- Propaganda in North Korea
- Salt and light
- Salt road
