= A Flower in Hell =

1958 Korean film directed by Shin Sang-ok

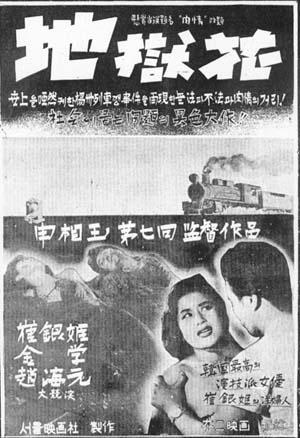
- Poster for A Flower in Hell (1958)
- Hangul: 지옥화
- Hanja: 地獄花
- RR: Jiokhwa
- MR: Chiokhwa
- Directed by: Shin Sang-ok
- Written by: Lee Jeong-seon
- Produced by: Shin Sang-ok
- Starring: Choi Eun-hee; Kim Hak
- Cinematography: Gang Beom-gu
- Edited by: Kim Yeong-hui
- Music by: Son Mok-in
- Distributed by: Seoul Films Co., Ltd.
- Release date: April 20, 1958
- Running time: 86 minutes
- Country: South Korea
- Language: Korean
- Box office: $7,203

A Flower in Hell (Korean: 지옥화; RR: Jiokhwa) is a 1958 South Korean drama film directed by Shin Sang-ok. For her performance in the film, Shin's wife, Choi Eun-hee was given the Best Actress award at the 2nd Buil Film Awards. During the Korean War, director Shin Sang-ok had shared an apartment with a prostitute in order to live more comfortably rather than sharing a one-room evacuation apartment with several families, giving him insight in the subject of the film.

== Plot ==
Two weeks after leaving the army, Dong-shik (Cho Hae-won), arrives in post-Korean War Seoul in search of his brother, Yeong-shik (Kim Hak-a), hoping to bring him back home to take care of their mother. The city is destitute, with few jobs, high crime, a huge American military presence, and a thriving black-market economy.

The next day, Dong-shik finds Yeong-shik at the market and chases him through the streets. He only catches up when Yeong-shik stops to flirt with his girlfriend, Sonya, an in-demand prostitute. Later at the river, Dong-shik meets Sonya's friend Julie, who speaks about the tribulations of being a prostitute and jokingly offers to marry him. When Yeong-shik comes back from his date, Dong-shik tries to make his case for them to leave the city but Yeong-shik insists on staying. Yeong-shik tries to leave him with some money before being called out to work.

Later that night, Yeong-shik and his gang sneaks onto the American base during a party to steal supplies, employing prostitutes to distract the guards. Dong-shik arrives at Sonya's residence to try to convince her to stop seeing his brother. Instead, Sonya seduces Dong-shik and his family photograph drops out of his pockets as he lays with her. They later go on a date by the river, which Yeong-shik eventually finds out about and beats Dong-shik for.

Dong-shik, having failed to retrieve his brother and unable to pursue his relationship with Sonya, prepares to head back home. At the crossroad, he sees Sonya greeting Yeong-shik goodbye. Before Dong-shik leaves, he has one final lunch with her.

Sonya offers to leave Yeong-shik for good and suggest that they could move to Hong Kong. She even reports Yeong-shik's heist so that she could run away with Dong-shik with no strings attached. When Dong-shik finds out, he leaves immediately to find his brother. Sonya follows shortly after.

With the tip, the military police easily prevent the gang's activities. Yeong-shik and others are slowly killed one after another as they attempt to escape from the police's pursuit. Yeong-shik eventually gets shot himself and crashes into the river.

Dong-shik finally catches up to Yeong-shik and retrieves him from the riverbank. When Sonya arrives, she tries to convince Dong-shik not to leave her. He ignores her pleas and leaves to retrieve his truck. Yeong-shik overhears her confessions and slowly chases Sonya further into the river. Deterred by the mud and failing to beg for mercy, Sonya eventually succumbs to Yeong-shik's approach and dies by his knife. Yeong-shik then dies by his own injuries.

With his brother and lover dead, Dong-shik prepares to head home. Julie sees him off and returns his family photograph. Dong-shik proposes to Julie then they both head back to the countryside.

== Cast ==
- Choi Eun-hee as Sonya
- Kim Hak as Yeong-shik
- Jo Hae-won as Dong-shik
- Kang Sun-hee as Julie

== Reception ==
Wally Adams of Asian Movie Pulse said that "despite the rather questionable buildup in places, The Flower in Hell is potent and mostly progressive early South Korean cinema that manages respectably level-headed examination of the society's outcasts". He then elaborated that "it serves as a fascinating progenitor of the genre-meshing trends that the industry would become known for worldwide today".

According to Panos Kotzathanasis of HanCinema, the film was a "great production", adding that it "[is] one of those movies that stay relevant forever, through a combination of artistry and realism".
