= Shin Sang-ok =

South Korean filmmaker (1925/26–2006)

- 신상옥
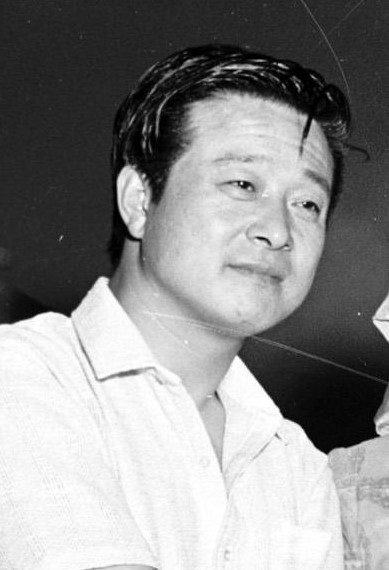
- Shin on May 29th, 1966
- Born: Shin Tae-ik (신태익); 1925 or 1926 (Note: Sources conflict on Shin's birth date. Screen International, Koreanfilm.org, and Far East Film Festival suggest that he was born in 1925. The Independent and The Guardian said he was born on October 11 of the following year, the Korean Movie Database claimed his birthday was September 12, 1926; the latter year was also mentioned by Korea JoongAng Daily and The Japan Times. Upon his death, Screen International, JoongAng Daily, and The New York Times reported his age to be 80 whereas The Guardian said he was 79. The Hankyoreh claimed that he was born on October 18, 1926, but also asserted he was 80 at the time of his death. During Shin's funeral, filmmaker Lee Jang-ho declared that he was born in 1926.); Seishin, Korea, Empire of Japan
- Died: April 11, 2006 (aged 79 or 80); Seoul, South Korea
- Other names: Shin Tae-seo (신태서); Simon S. Sheen
- Citizenship: South Korea; United States (from 1989)
- Education: Tokyo University of the Arts
- Occupations: Film director; producer
- Years active: 1945–2004
- Spouses: Choi Eun-hee (m. 1954; div. 1976) (m. 1983)
- Partner: Oh Soo-mi (c. 1973–1978)
- Children: 4

Korean name
- Hangul: 신상옥
- Hanja: 申相玉
- RR: Sin Sangok
- MR: Sin Sangok

Shin Sang-ok (Korean: 신상옥; Hanja: 申相玉; 1925 or 1926 – April 11, 2006), anglicized as Simon Sheen, was a South Korean filmmaker who directed 74 films in a career spanning over five decades. He is best known in South Korea for his efforts during the 1950s and 1960s, many of them collaborations with his wife Choi Eun-hee. Shin posthumously received the Gold Crown Cultural Medal, the country's top honor for an artist.

In 1978, Shin and Choi were kidnapped by order of Kim Jong Il, who wanted them to improve the North Korean film industry. The couple remained in captivity for 8 years and Shin directed seven films for Kim, including An Emissary of No Return, Runaway (both 1984), Love, Love, My Love, Salt, and Pulgasari (produced in 1985), before they escaped in 1986 and sought asylum in the United States. Shin gained American citizenship in 1989, and continued to produce films in the United States, now under his adopted name Simon S. Sheen. He and Choi eventually returned to South Korea for his final years.

== Early life ==
Sometime between 1925 and 1926, Shin was born Shin Tae-ik (신태익) or Shin Tae-seo (신태서) in Chongjin, in the northeastern part of the Korean Peninsula, at the time occupied by Japan and currently a part of North Korea. His father was a prominent doctor of Korean medicine. Shin studied in Japan at Tokyo Fine Arts School, the predecessor of Tokyo National University of Fine Arts and Music, before returning to Korea three years later.

== Career in South Korea (1946–1978) ==
Shin started his film career as an assistant production designer on Choi In-kyu's Viva Freedom!, the first Korean film made after the country achieved independence from Japan. During the "Golden Age" of South Korean cinema in the late 1950s and 1960s, Shin worked prolifically, often directing two or more films per year, earning the nickname the "Prince of South Korean Cinema". Shin featured the Western princess, female sex workers for American soldiers, in The Evil Night (1952) and A Flower in Hell (1958). The production company he started, Shin Films, produced around 300 films during the 1960s, including Prince Yeonsan (1961), the winner of the Best Film prize at the first Grand Bell Awards ceremony and a Grand Bell Award-winning 1964 remake of Na Woon-gyu's 1926 Beongeoli Sam-ryong. His 1961 film The Houseguest and My Mother became the first South Korean submission for the Academy Award for Best Foreign Language Film.

During the 1970s, Shin became less active, while South Korea's cinema industry in general suffered under strict censorship and constant government interference. Most of the films he directed during this period ended up being flops. After Shin ran afoul of the repressive government in 1978, Park Chung Hee closed Shin's studio.

== North Korean period (1978–1986) ==
In 1978, Shin's former wife, Choi Eun-hee, an actress who starred in many of his films, was kidnapped in Hong Kong and taken to North Korea. Shin himself came under suspicion of causing her disappearance and when he traveled to Hong Kong to investigate, he was kidnapped as well. The kidnappings were on orders of future leader Kim Jong Il, who wanted to establish a film industry for his country to sway international opinion regarding the views of the Workers' Party of Korea. The North Korean authorities have denied the kidnapping accusations, claiming that Shin came to the country willingly. Shin and Choi made secret audiotapes of conversations with Kim Jong Il, which supported their story.

Shin was put in comfortable accommodation, but after two escape attempts was placed in a prison for over two years. Once his re-education in North Korean ideology was thought to be complete, he was taken to Pyongyang in 1983 to meet Kim Jong Il and learn why he had been abducted to North Korea. His ex-wife was brought to the same dinner party, where she first learned that Shin was also in North Korea. They remarried shortly afterwards, as suggested by Kim Jong Il.

From 1983 on, Shin directed seven films, with Kim Jong Il acting as an executive producer. The last and best-known of these films is Pulgasari, a giant-monster film similar to the Japanese Godzilla. In 1986, eight years after his kidnapping, Shin and his wife escaped while in Vienna for a film festival. They managed to obtain political asylum from the US embassy in Vienna and Kim Jong Il became convinced that the couple had been kidnapped by the Americans. Shin and his wife lived covertly for two years in Reston, Virginia, under American protection and authorities debriefed the couple about Kim Jong Il and their experience in North Korea.

== Late life (1986–2006) ==
The couple finally staged their escape in 1986 while on a trip to Vienna, where they fled to the United States embassy and requested political asylum. According to former CIA officer Michael Lee, Choi and Shin became American citizens in 1989 (three years after their escape) and adopted the names Theresa Sheen and Simon Sheen respectively. They lived in Reston, Virginia, then Beverly Hills, California, where Shin worked in the 1990s, directing 3 Ninjas Knuckle Up and working as an executive producer for 3 Ninjas Kick Back and 3 Ninjas: High Noon at Mega Mountain, before returning to South Korea in 1999.

In 1994, he was invited to the Cannes Film Festival as a jury member. At first, Shin was reluctant to go back to South Korea, because he feared that the government's security police would not believe the kidnapping story; he eventually returned to South Korea permanently in 1999 and continued to work on new movies. His last movie as a director was a 2002 film called Kyeoul-iyagi (The Story of Winter). The film's editing was finished by Sin's son, Shin Jung-kyun and cinematographer Jo Dong-gwan, and released finally in 2023.

Shin ended his career in 2004. That year, Shin underwent a liver transplant. He died of complications caused by hepatitis two years later. At the time of his death he was planning a musical about Genghis Khan. South Korean President Roh Moo-hyun posthumously awarded Shin the Gold Crown Cultural Medal on April 12, 2006, the country's top honor for an artist.

== In media ==
In 2015, an English language biography of his life (along with Choi Eun-hee), called A Kim Jong-Il Production: The Extraordinary True Story of a Kidnapped Filmmaker, was published by Paul Fischer.

In January 2016, at the 2016 Sundance Film Festival, in the World Cinema Documentary Competition, a documentary about the North Korean ordeal, entitled The Lovers and the Despot and directed by Robert Cannan and Ross Adam, was presented.

In 2017, BBC Radio 4 broadcast a drama Lights, Camera, Kidnap!, based on Shin's ordeal, written by Lucy Catherine, directed by Sasha Yevtushenko, and starring Paul Courtenay Hyu as Shin and Liz Sutherland as Choi.

== Works ==
=== Filmography ===
Partial filmography as director:

- A Flower in Hell (1958)
- To the Last Day (1960)
- Prince Yeonsan (1961)
- Seong Chun-hyang (1961)
- The Houseguest and My Mother (1961)
- The Memorial Gate for Virtuous Women (1962)
- Tyrant Yeonsan (1962)
- Rice (1963)
- Red Scarf (1964)
- Deaf Sam-yong (1964)
- Phantom Queen (1967)
- Prince Daewon (1968)
- Ghosts of Chosun (1970)
- A Woman with Half Soul (1973)
- The Three-Day Reign (1973)
- At 13 Years Old (13세 소년) (1974)
- An Emissary of No Return (1984)
- Runaway (1984)
- Love, Love, My Love (1985)
- Salt (1985)
- The Tale of Shim Chong (1985)
- Pulgasari (1985)
- Breakwater (방파제) (1985)
- Mayumi (1990)
- Vanished (증발) (1994)
- 3 Ninjas Knuckle Up (1995)

=== Executive producer ===
- Galgameth (1996)

=== Bibliography ===
- Shin Sang-ok (2007). I Was a Film (in Korean). Seoul: Random House Korea.
- Shin Sang-ok; Choi Eun-hee (1988). Chogugŭn Chŏhanŭl Chŏmŏlli [My Motherland is Faraway] (in Korean). Vol. 2. Monterey: Pacific Artist Cooperation.
- —; — (1988). The Kingdom of Kim Jong-il (in Korean). Tonga Il-bosa.
- —; — (1994). Sugi: Nere Kim Jong il Ipnida [Diary: My Name is Kim Jong-il] (in Korean). Seoul: Haenglim Publisher.
- —; — (2001). Uriŭi Talchurŭn Kkŭnaji Anatta [Our Escape has not Ended yet] (in Korean). Seoul: Wŏlgan Chosŏnsa.
- Shin Sang-ok; Choi Eun-hee; Yi Chang-ho (2009). Yŏnghwa kamdok Sin Sang-o: kŭ ŭi sajin p'unggyŏng kŭrigo parŏn 1926-2006 영화 감독 신 상옥: 그 의 사진 풍경 그리고 발언 1926-2006 [Walks and Works of Shin Sang-ok: The Mogul of Korean Film] (in Korean). P'aju-si: Yŏrhwadang. ISBN 9788930103459.

== See also ==
- North Korean abductions of South Koreans
