= Abduction of Shin Sang-ok and Choi Eun-hee =

Abduction by North Korea

- Part of the North Korean abductions of South Koreans
- (Left to right) Shin Sang-ok, Kim Jong Il, and Choi Eun-hee, c. 1984
- Native name: 신상옥·최은희 납치 사건
- Location: Abduction: Hong Kong; Confinement: North Korea (Note: Shin also traveled abroad during his abduction, but remained under North Korean surveillance. According to Teruyoshi Nakano, the special effects director of Shin's last North Korean production Pulgasari, "he kept going to other countries like Japan to figure out the best way to escape.")
- Date: 1978 – March 13, 1986
- Target: Shin Sang-ok
- Attack type: Kidnapping
- Perpetrator: Kim Jong Il
- Motive: To improve North Korean cinema

The abduction of Shin Sang-ok and Choi Eun-hee occurred in North Korea between 1978 and 1986. Shin Sang-ok was a famous South Korean filmmaker who was married to actress Choi Eun-hee. Together, they established Shin Film and made many films through the 1960s, which garnered recognition for South Korea at various film festivals. In January 1978, Choi was abducted in Hong Kong and taken to North Korea to the country's future supreme leader Kim Jong Il. The abduction of Shin followed six months later.

After three years in prison, Shin was united with Choi. The two were instructed by Kim Jong Il to make films for him to gain global recognition for North Korea's film industry. Shin directed seven films for Kim from 1984 until 1985: An Emissary of No Return, Love, Love, My Love; Runaway, Breakwater, Salt, The Tale of Shim Chong, and most famously, Pulgasari. In 1986, Choi and Shin escaped from North Korean supervision to the US embassy while in Vienna. Under Kim's orders, Shin's films were banned in North Korea thereupon.

== Kim Jong Il and film ==
Kim Jong Il joined the Propaganda and Agitation Department in 1966 and soon became director of the Motion Picture and Arts Division. He was a big fan of films, with a library of 15,000 at his disposal. As director, he reached the public with films and operas homogeneous in theme: pride in the nation and specifically in Kim Il Sung.

Charles K. Armstrong writes in his book, Tyranny of the Weak: North Korea and the World 1950–1992, that "Kim took North Korean arts in a direction that seemed specifically designed to ensure his father's favor: under his guidance, new films and operas focused as never before on the anti-Japanese struggle of Kim Il Sung and his comrades in Manchuria during the 1930s".

Kim Jong Il was frustrated with North Korean films in the early 1970s. He could tell that in contrast to the other films being released globally, North Korea's were stiff and lifeless. His diagnosis was a lack of enthusiasm from his actors and crew. Bradley K. Martin, author of Under the Loving Care of the Fatherly Leader: North Korea and the Kim Dynasty, explains this while quoting a 1983 tape recording of Kim: "The difference, he suggested, was that North Korean film industry people knew that the state would feed them even if they performed only minimally, so they didn't try hard... 'Because they have to earn money,' Kim said, Southern movie industry people expended blood, sweat, and tears to get results."

He needed fresh and passionate voices that would advance North Korean cinema. In the grand scale of Kim Jong Il's plan, further excerpts from the recording went as follows: "If we continually show Western films on television, show them without restraint, then only nihilistic thoughts can come about... all those things, patriotism, patriotism – we have to increase this, but we only make them idolize Western things... So we must advance the technology before opening... thus, because of this, I want to give rights to a limited degree."

== Capture ==
On January 11, 1978, actress Choi Eun-hee traveled to Hong Kong having been offered to direct a film, with the possibility of running a performing academy in a Hong Kong school. According to an April 1984 report by South Korea's Agency for National Security Planning (ANSP), Choi was abducted by North Korean agents in Hong Kong on January 14, 1978. She was taken from Repulse Bay and arrived in Nampo Harbor, North Korea, on January 22, 1978. She was housed in a luxury villa called Building Number 1. Choi toured the city and was shown both Pyongyang and Kim Il Sung's birthplace, among other landmarks and museums. She was later given a private tutor, who instructed her on the life and achievements of Kim Il Sung. Kim Jong Il took her to movies, operas, musicals, and parties. He asked her opinion on various films and respected her perspective. She was not informed that she had been kidnapped as bait for Shin until five years after her capture.

After Choi disappeared, Shin Sang-ok began searching for her. They had been divorced and Shin had another family at that time. Shin had also been struggling with the South Korean government because his film license for Shin Studios had been revoked. He had been traveling the world hoping for one of his films to be greenlit. Six months after Choi's capture, Shin was kidnapped by North Korean operatives while he was staying in Hong Kong. ANSP stated that Shin's abduction began on July 19. Though he was also given lavish accommodations, he initially was not told about the capture of Choi. After two failed escape attempts, he was sent to prison for disobedience. On February 23, 1983, Shin received a letter saying he was to be released from jail. On March 7, 1983, Shin and Choi were reunited at a party hosted by Kim Jong Il.

== Films ==
Shin and Choi were shown Kim Jong Il's vast personal film library, which reportedly consisted of over 15,000 films from around the world. The couple was instructed to watch and critique four films per day. The majority of films were from the communist bloc, though there were also the occasional Hollywood films. Shin and Choi displayed respect for Kim's film knowledge and perspective. Eventually, Kim shared how he wanted Shin to direct a film and enter it into an international contest. Shin would have an office at Choson Film Studios in Pyongyang. Kim was aware that the internal propaganda slant of his films might not appeal to an international audience and garner spots in international contests, so he allowed Shin to broaden the subject material and select themes that would be more acceptable abroad. Shin began work on 20 October 1983. Shin and Choi won an award for one of their films at a festival in Czechoslovakia. The final and most expensive film that they made under Kim Jong Il was called Pulgasari, which was heavily influenced by the recently popular Godzilla films.

All of the films Shin and Choi worked on in North Korea were banned upon their escape. According to Shin's obituary in Munhwa Ilbo in 2006, the seven films Shin directed in North Korea are considered milestones in the history of Korean cinema, especially Pulgasari since it later became the first North Korean film to be shown in South Korean theaters.

Their films included the following:

1. An Emissary of No Return (Doraoji annun milsa, 1984): Based on a stage play called Bloody Conference written by Kim Il Sung. In the film, Ri Jun, a Korean emissary at The Hague International Peace Conference in 1907 tries to convince the international community to help reverse the Japanese-Korean Protective Treaty of 1905, which left Korea under Japanese leadership. Ri Jun delivers a speech at the conference and when he fails to win support from the Western powers, he commits hara-kiri in front of the diplomats. Shin shot sections of the film in Czechoslovakia and used European actors, something never done before in North Korean cinema.
2. Love, Love, My Love (Sarang sarang nae sarang, 1984): A take on the ancient Korean folk tale, The Tale of Chunhyang. The film was shot as a musical and featured a first in North Korean cinema, a slightly veiled kiss between the two leading actors. Chunhyang falls in love with Mongnyong, a wealthy aristocrat, but he must leave to the capital to train to be a government official. While he is gone, a new governor takes over the province and falls for Chunhyang. When rejected, he imprisons her. Just before she is about to be executed, Mongnyong returns to save her.
3. Runaway (Talchulgi, 1984): A story set in the 1920s in the Japanese colonial period. Protagonist Song-ryul and his wife (played by Choi Eun-hee) live in poverty. The family moves to the Gando area of Manchuria looking for a better life, but their suffering persists. Song-ryul joins the ranks of the Kim Il Sung group and once he is with the guerrillas, he blows up a Japanese army train.
4. Breakwater (Bangpaje, 1985): Bangpaje (Korean: 방파제) This film depicts the construction of the Nampo Sea Barrage on North Korea's west coast. According to Shin Sang-ok and Choi Eun-hee's 2001 memoir, the film centers on workers and engineers tasked with closing off “20 ri” of open sea in order to build the massive breakwater. The narrative emphasizes collective labor, industrial heroism, and dedication to socialist construction. Model workers, technicians, and Party officials confront natural obstacles and technical failures as they attempt to complete the barrage. The breakwater itself serves as the film's central symbolic element, representing the triumph of human organization and ideological resolve over nature. Detailed scene-level descriptions, character lists, and specific dramatic developments are unknown because the film has never been made available for public viewing outside North Korea. Film scholars note that unlike several of Shin's other North Korean productions, it has never circulated and cannot be viewed in archives or public collections. As a result, academic writing on the film relies solely on memoir descriptions and filmographic records rather than visual analysis.
5. Salt (Sogum, 1985): A story set in Gando in the 1930s. A family hides a wealthy Korean-Chinese merchant, and the husband is killed in a fight between Japanese police and Chinese bandits. The wife (played by Choi Eun-hee) believes that her husband died because of the communists. Then the wife, in poverty, asks for the Korean-Chinese merchant's help, but he rapes her. After a series of tragedies, a neighbor tells her about a lucrative illegal business: smuggling salt. While she is smuggling salt, the group she is with is attacked by the Japanese, and a communist group saves her. She discovers that the communists were actually the ones fighting for the common people and sets out to join them. Choi won best actress at the Moscow International Film Festival for this role.
6. The Tale of Shim Chong (Simcheongjeon, 1985): Shin directed a musical version of this classic tale of filial piety. Shim Chong lives with her blind father. She sacrifices herself so that his blindness can be cured, so she is taken by merchant sailors. They toss her overboard and she goes down to the palace of the God of the Sea. She is put back on land inside of a giant floating orchid. She is found by the king, and they fall in love and are married. In the end, Shim Chong is reunited with her father, and he is cured of his blindness.
7. Pulgasari (1985): This film was heavily influenced by the popular Godzilla films at the time. It is about a farmers' uprising in medieval Korea. A little girl pricks her finger while sewing, and the blood falls on a little toy of a monster made out of rice, causing it to come to life as a monster. It fights for the farmers and smashes the emperor's palace. Nevertheless, his appetite is so big that he starts eating the farmers' tools, so the girl who spawned it decides to sacrifice herself by disguising herself as Pulgasari's food. When the monster accidentally eats the girl, he explodes and dies.

== Escape ==
To defend themselves should they ever escape North Korea, Choi and Shin decided to sneak in a tape recorder to their conversations with Kim Jong Il so they would have proof that they did not willingly leave the South. In one conversation recorded on October 19, 1983, Kim spoke openly about his plot to kidnap Shin and Choi to upgrade North Korea's film industry. He told Shin and Choi that it would be best if they spoke to the press saying that they came to North Korea voluntarily. Shin and Choi attended a press conference on April 12, 1984, in Belgrade, Yugoslavia where they said they were in North Korea by their own choosing.

After finishing Pulgasari, the two were in talks with Kim about another film when they took a trip to Vienna in 1986. Kim had requested Choi and Shin travel to the Austrian city to find someone that would finance a biographical film about Genghis Khan. On March 12, 1986, the couple checked into the InterContinental Vienna to meet a journalist named Akira Enoki under the pretense of an interview, and convinced their North Korean bodyguards to leave the room. Choi and Shin managed to get into a taxi and, after being chased by the North Koreans into traffic congestion, the pair got out of the taxi and sprinted into the United States embassy. The New York Times posted an article on March 22, 1986, announcing that the couple got away from their North Korean caretakers and sought political asylum in the US embassy.

Following their escape, Shin lived in the United States for many years working in the film industry before returning home to South Korea. North Korea issued a statement denying the claims that Shin and Choi had been kidnapped and instead maintained that Shin and Choi had voluntarily defected to North Korea and claimed they embezzled a large amount of North Korean money intended to finance the Genghis Khan film.

== Legacy ==
After the release of Paul Fischer's book, A Kim Jong-Il Production, in 2015, the abduction of Shin Sang-ok and Choi Eun-hee piqued the interest of those outside Korea. Vanity Fair documented a screening of Pulgasari in Brooklyn, New York, in April 2015. The Washington Post suspects a film will be made retelling the story. BBC Radio Four broadcast a 90-minute dramatisation in September 2017.

In January 2016, at the 2016 Sundance Film Festival, in the World Cinema Documentary Competition, a documentary about the North Korean ordeal, entitled The Lovers and the Despot and directed by Robert Cannan and Ross Adam, was presented.

In 2017, Arte released Kim Kong, a French dark comedy mini-series written by Simon Jablonka and Alexis Le Sec and directed by Stephen Cafiero. Loosely based upon the Shin Sang-Ok case, the series stars Jonathan Lambert as a French director coerced into working for the dictator of a fictional East Asian country.

== See also ==
- Cinema of North Korea
- List of kidnappings
- Lists of solved missing person cases
- North Korean abductions of South Koreans
- On the Art of the Cinema
- Residences of North Korean leaders
