= Choi Eun-hee =

South Korean actress (1926–2018)

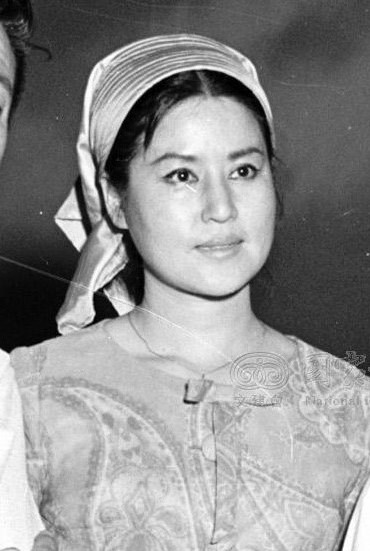
- Choi in 1966
- Born: November 20, 1926; Kōshū, Keiki Province, Korea, Empire of Japan
- Died: April 16, 2018 (aged 91); Gangseo District, Seoul, South Korea
- Other name: Theresa Sheen
- Citizenship: South Korea; United States (from 1989)
- Occupation: Actress
- Years active: 1942–2006
- Spouses: Shin Sang-ok (m. 1954; div. 1976) (m. 1983; died 2006)

Korean name
- Hangul: 최은희
- Hanja: 崔銀姬
- RR: Choe Eunhui
- MR: Ch'oe Ŭnhŭi

Choi Eun-hee (Korean: 최은희; November 20, 1926 – April 16, 2018) was a South Korean actress. She was one of South Korea's most popular stars of the 1960s and 1970s. In 1978, Choi and her then ex-husband, movie director Shin Sang-ok, were abducted to North Korea, where they were forced to make films until they sought asylum at the United States embassy in Vienna in 1986. They returned to South Korea in 1999 after spending a decade in the United States.

== Biography ==
=== Early career and success in South Korea ===
Choi was born in Kōshū, Keiki Province, Japanese Korea, (today Gwangju, Gyeonggi Province), in 1926. Her first acting role was in the 1947 film A New Oath. She rose to fame the following year after starring in the 1948 film The Sun of Night and soon became known as one of the "troika" of Korean film, alongside actresses Kim Ji-mee and Um Aing-ran.

After she married director Shin Sang-ok in 1954, the two founded Shin Film. Choi went on to act in over 130 films and was considered one of the biggest stars of South Korean film in the 1960s and 1970s. She starred in many of Shin's iconic films, including 1958's A Flower in Hell and 1961's The Houseguest and My Mother.

After she was diagnosed with infertility, they adopted two children together, Jeong-kyun and Myung-kim.

=== Abduction and years in North Korea ===
In 1976, Choi divorced Shin after seeing news that he had fathered two children with young actress Oh Su-mi. Choi's career began to suffer after her divorce, and she traveled to Hong Kong in 1978 to meet with a person posing as a businessman who offered to set up a new film company with her. In Hong Kong, Choi was abducted and taken to North Korea by the order of Kim Jong Il. While searching for Choi after her abduction, Shin was also abducted and taken to North Korea soon after.

In North Korea, Choi and Shin were remarried, at Kim's recommendation. Kim had them make films together, including 1985's Salt, for which Choi won best actress at the 14th Moscow International Film Festival. Choi later said that the couple was able to make "films with artistic values, instead of just propaganda films extolling the regime," but that she could not forgive Kim for kidnapping her. While in North Korea, Choi converted to Catholicism.

=== Escape and later life ===
The couple finally staged their escape in 1986 while on a trip to Vienna, where they fled to the United States embassy and requested political asylum. According to former CIA agent Michael Lee, Choi and Shin became American citizens in 1989 (three years after their escape) and adopted the names Theresa Sheen and Simon Sheen respectively. They lived in Reston, Virginia, then Beverly Hills, California, before returning to South Korea in 1999.

On April 16, 2018, Choi died at 91 in a hospital where she was due to undergo kidney dialysis in the afternoon. Her death resulted in widespread mourning across South Korea.

== In media ==
In 2015, film producer and writer Paul Fischer released an English-language biography of Choi's and Shin's lives titled A Kim Jong-Il Production: The Extraordinary True Story of a Kidnapped Filmmaker, His Star Actress, and a Young Dictator's Rise to Power. In January 2016, at the 2016 Sundance Film Festival, in the World Cinema Documentary Competition, a documentary about the North Korean ordeal, entitled The Lovers and the Despot, directed by Robert Cannan and Ross Adam, was presented.

== Select filmography ==
Year	Title	Role	Ref.
Korea, Empire of Japan
1947	A New Oath		
1948	The Sun of Night		
1949	A Hometown in Heart	Widow	
South Korea
1958	A Flower in Hell	Sonya	
1960	To the Last Day		
1961	Evergreen Tree		
1961	Prince Yeonsan	Deposed Queen Shin	
1961	Seong Chun-hyang	Seong Chunhyang	
1961	The Houseguest and My Mother	Mother	
1962	A Happy Day of Jinsa Maeng	Ip-bun	
1962	The Memorial Gate for Virtuous Women		
1963	Rice		
1964	Red Scarf	Ji-seon	
1964	Deaf Sam-yong		
1965	The Sino-Japanese War and Queen Min the Heroine		
1967	Phantom Queen		
1968	Woman		
North Korea
1984	Runaway	Song Ryul's wife	
1985	Love, Love, My Love	Chunhyang's mother	
1985	Salt	Mother	
1985	The Tale of Shim Chong	Shim Chong's mother	

== Awards ==
=== Buil Film Awards ===
Year	Category	Nominated work	Result	Ref.
1959	Best Actress	A Flower in Hell	Won	
1962	Best Actress	The Houseguest and My Mother	Won	
1966	Best Actress	The Sino-Japanese War and Queen Min the Heroine	Won	

=== Blue Dragon Film Awards ===
Year	Category	Nominated work	Result	Ref.
1964	Popular Star Award	—N/a	Won	
1966	Popular Star Award	—N/a	Won	

=== Grand Bell Awards ===
Year	Category	Nominated work	Result	Ref.
1962	Best Actress	Evergreen Tree	Won	
1965	Best Actress	The Sino-Japanese War and Queen Min the Heroine	Won	
2010	Korean Film Achievement Award	—N/a	Won	

=== Other awards ===
Year	Award	Category	Nominated work	Result	Ref.
2006	Korean Film Awards	Achievement Award	—N/a	Won	
2008	Korean Association of Film Critics Awards	Special Achievement Award	—N/a	Won	
2009	Chunsa Film Festival	Chunsa Award	—N/a	Won	
2014	Korean Popular Culture and Arts Awards	Order of Cultural Merit	—N/a	Won	

== Bibliography ==
- Choi Eun-hee (2007). Confessions of Choi Eun-hee [최 은희 의 고백: 영화 보다 더 영화 같은 삶] (in Korean). Seoul: Random House Korea. ISBN 9788925513997.
- Choi Eun-hee; Shin Sang-ok; Yi Chang-ho (2009). Walks and Works of Shin Sang-ok: The Mogul of Korean Film - Photos and Words, 1926-2006 [영화 감독 신 상옥: 그 의 사진 풍경 그리고 발언 1926-2006] (in Korean). Paju: Youlhwadang Publishers. ISBN 9788930103459.
