= List of North Korean actors =

This is a list of North Korean actors.

== List of actors ==
Titles and awards	Name	Korean Name	Main appearance(s)	Notes	Ref(s)
	James Joseph Dresnok	제임스 조새프 드레스녹	Unsung Heroes, From 5 p.m. to 5 a.m	American soldier who defected 1962 and has since played the part of Westerners in several films.	
	Pak Mi-hyang	박미향	The Schoolgirl's diary		
	Song Hye-rim	성혜림		Consort of the late Kim Jong Il, mother of the late Kim Jong Nam	
People's Actress	Woo In-hee	우인희	The Story of a Detachement Commander, The Town Where We Live	Mistress of Kim Jong Il, executed and purged from all media in 1981	
	Kim Hyon-hui	김현희		One of the agents responsible for the bombing of Korean Air Flight 858	
Kim Jong Il Prize People's Actress	Hong Yong-hui	홍영희	The Flower Girl, The Star of Korea	Born in 1955, performed live at Great Party, Rosy Korea.	
Merited Actor	Kim Son-nam	김선남	The Star of Korea, Comrade Kim Goes Flying	Born in 1948, performed live at Great Party, Rosy Korea	
Labour Hero People's Actor	Choe Chang-su	최창수	Nation and Destiny, Wolmi Island	Died in February 2020. Kim Jong Un sent a wreath of flowers to his grave.	
People's Actor	Choe Pong-sik	최봉식	Nation and Destiny		
Labour Hero People's Actor	Yu Won-jun	유원준	Nation and Destiny		
Merited Actress	Ryu Kyong-ae	류경애	Nation and Destiny		
Merited Actor	Han Yong-phal	한영팔	Nation and Destiny		
	Ri Yong-chol	리영철	The Tale of 15 Children		
People's Actress	Ri Sol-hui	리설휘	Song of Love		
People's Actor	Kim Chol	김철	Run and Run		
Merited Actor	Kim Myong-mun	김명문	The Third Golden Medal		
	Yom Myong-hui	염명희	The Third Golden Medal		
People's Actress	O Mi-ran	오미란	A Broad Bellflower, Nation and Destiny	One of North Korea's biggest film stars. Died in 2006 from breast cancer at the age of 51. She is buried in the Patriotic Martyrs' Cemetery alongside independence fighters.	
Kim Il Sung Prize People's Actress	Kim Jong-hwa	김정화	My Happiness, Nation and Destiny		
People's Actor	So Kyong-sop	김경섶	Ask Yourself		
People's Actress	So Sin-hyang	서신향	Ask Yourself		
	Ri Hyon	리현	The Country I Saw		
	Jo Il-mi	조일미	The Country I Saw		
People's Actress	Jong Son-hwa	정선화	Cradle		
People's Actor	Ri Jong-chon	리정천	A Day Before, The Star of Korea	Born in 1945, performed live at Great Party, Rosy Korea	
People's Actress	Kim Yong-hui	김영희	A Day Before		
People's Actor	Sin Myong-suk	신명숙	Japanese Invasion in 1592		
People's Actor	Jo Myong-son	조명선	Soul of Celadon		
People's Actress	Ri Kyong-hui	리경휘			
People's Actor	Ri Won-bok	리원벅			
	Pak Jong-thaek	박정택	A Promise Made in Pyongyang		
	Ham Pok-sil	함벅실	Formation of Girl-Piloted Raider		
	Pak Kum-sil	박금실	An Ambitious Girl		
	Kim Ryon-hwa	김련화	We Live Here		
People's Actor	Jong Un-mo	정은모	Speeding to the Sky		
Merited Actress	Ri Wol-suk	리월숙	Their Life Continues		
	Kim Sun	김순	The Kites Flying in the Sky		
	Ryo Chol	료철	The Kites Flying in the Sky		
Kim Jong Il Prize People's Actor	Ri Ik-sung	리익성	Inheritance, Comrade Kim Goes Flying		
	Kim Chong-gil	김청길	Inheritance		
	Kim Hye-gyong	김혜경	Pyongyang Nalpharam		
	Ri Kyang-hak	리걍학	Soldier's Image		
	Kim Ho-song	김호성	Soldier's Image		
	Jong Kwang-nam	정광남	A Bouquet of Dandelion Flowers		
People's Actor	Rim Yong-ho	림영호	Our Life		
	Thae Sang-hun	태상훈	The Call of the Naval Port		
	Ri Chol-min	리철민	A Day of Training		
	Sin Hak-myong	신학명	A Big-Game Hunter		
Merited Actor	Han Ki-sop	한기섭	A Small House at the Forefront		
Kim Il Sung Prize People's Actor	Kim Ryong-rin	김룡린	Lifeline, Nation and Destiny, They Met on the Taedong River		
	Pak Yong	박영	Distress, Comrade Kim Goes Flying		
	Ri Yong-jun	리영준	Distress		
	Ri Hyang-suk	리향숙	Inseparable Human Feelings		
	Kim Jong-gwang	김정광	Inseparable Human Feelings		
	Kwon Yong-thae	권원태	Brotherly Feeling		
	Kim Chon-il	김천일	Brotherly Feeling		
	Ri Mi-hyang	리미향	The Wheels of Happiness		
	Ri Kwang-sun	리광순	The Wheels of Happiness		
	Pak Na-ri	박나리	Bright Sunshine		
	Yun Hyang-chun	윤향춘	My Family		
Merited Actress	Kim Ryong-ok	김령옥	My Family		
	Jon Kyong-son	전경선	My Family		
	Jong Un-sil	정은실	My Family		
	Ri Song-gwang	리성광	Wish		
Merited Actress	Yun Su-gyong	윤수경	A Rice Flower		
	Kim Ryong-man	김령만	A Rice Flower		
	Paek Sol-mi	백설미	The Story of Our Home		
	Choe Yong-ho	최영호	Footprints of Military Service		
	Pak Su-hyang	박수향	A Diploma of Graduation		
	Choe Song	최성	A Diploma of Graduation		
Merited Actor	Ko Sung-ryong	고숭령	Setting Sail		
People's Actor	Sok Song-jae	석성재	Setting Sail		
	Pak Song-uk	박성윽	Our Warm House		
	Kang Nam-hun	강남훈	The White Gold Mountain		
Merited Actress	An Son-yong	안선영	Our Neighbors		
	Kim Song-ho	김성호	Our Neighbors		
	Kang Il-sim	강일심	Small Playground of a Primary School		
	Kim Un-mi	김은미	Long-Awaited Father		
	Hyon Jong-hun	현정훈	Flames		
	Ri Su-ryong	리수령	The Bulletproof Wall		
	Ri Su-gyong	리수경	The Bulletproof Wall		
	Hong Il-myong	홍일명	The Bulletproof Wall		
	Kim Won-il	김원일	Chastisement	Not to be confused with Kim Won-il, synthesizer player in the Pochonbo Electronic Ensembe	
	Kim Yong-min	김영민	Chastisement		
	Kim Hyok-sin	김혁신	Chastisement		
	Ri Kwang-gyu	리광규	Glow of the North		
	Song Su-ryon	성수련	Glow of the North		
	Ku Song-bok	구성복	Glow of the North		
	Choe Yui-yong	최희영	Glow of the North		
People's Actor	Pak Ki-ju	박기주	Nation and Destiny, The Country I Saw, The Family of Choe Hak Sin, Guarantee	One of the "three celebrated actors" of North Korea	
Merited Actress	Kim Yong-suk	김영숙	Nation and Destiny, O Youth!, The Story of a Blooming Flower	Wife of famous conductor Kim Il-jin	
People's Actor	Ri Yong-ho	리영호	On the Green Carpet, Hong Kil Dong, Our Lifeline, Nation and Destiny, Comrade Kim Goes Flying	Ri Yong-ho also acted in music videos. Ri Yong-ho was described as a 'North Korean sex symbol'.	
	Ri Un-jun	리은주		Voice actor	
	Choe Sun-bong	최순봉		Voice actor	
	Song Yong-chol	성영철		Voice actor	
	Rim Pok-hui	림복희		Voice actor	
	Kim Yong-chol	김영철		Voice actor	
People's Actor	Jang Yu-song	장유성	The Story of a Blooming Flower, Nation and Destiny, Forever in Our Memory, Magnolia	Described as a pillar actor of the 4.25 Korean Film Studio	

== Creative Staff ==
Titles and awards	Name	Korean Name	Profession	Main Work	Notes	Ref(s)
	Ri Jong-hyon	리정현	Scriptwriter	What I Must Do		
Kim Il Sung Prize	Ri Hui-chan	리희찬	Scriptwriter	Let's Go to Mt Kumgang, They Met on the Taedong River, The Problem of Our Family	Specializes in comedy and light films.	
People's Artiste	Pak Se-ung	발세웅	Director	A Broad Bellflower		
Kim Il Sung Prize People's Prize	O Hye-yong	오혜영	Scriptwriter	My Happiness		
Labour Hero Kim Il Sung Prize People's Artiste	Pak Jong-ju	박정주	Scriptwriter	Ask Yourself		
Kim Il Sung Prize	Choe Il-sim	최일심	Scriptwriter	The Country I Saw		
	Kim Hak	김학	Scriptwriter	Sisters		
Kim Il Sung Prize	Jang Yu-son	장유선	Scriptwriter	An Urban Girl Comes to Get Married	Her most well-known work is one of the few feature-length films produced by students in North Korea	
Merited Artiste	Jon Jong-phal	전정팔	Director	O Youth!, A Family Basketball Team	Most films directed by Jon are comedy films	
Kim Il Sung Prize	Yui Ung-yong	위웅용	Scriptwriter	Two Families in Haeun-dong, Myself in the Distant Future		
	Son Kwang-su	선광숙	Scriptwriter	She was a Student		
	Sin Myong-sik	신명식	Scriptwriter	Comrade Kim Goes Flying		
	Kim Chol	김철	Scriptwriter	Comrade Kim Goes Flying		
	Kim Kwang-hun	김광훈	Director	Comrade Kim Goes Flying		
Kim Il Sung Prize People's Artiste	Jon Hong-sok	정홍석	Camera operator	Hong Kil Dong		
	Won Yong-sil	원영실	Scriptwriter	Be Proud of the Youths		
	So Chan	서찬	Scriptwriter	The Kites Flying in the Sky		
	Sin Myong-hak	신명학	Camera operator	Pyongyang Nalpharam		
	Jon In-gwang	전인광	Scriptwriter	Young Brigade Commander		
	Pak Chol-hak	박철학	Director	A Small House at the Forefront		
Merited Artiste	U Yuwang	우유광	Director	Distress		
	Kim Un-ok	김운옥	Scriptwriter	Inseparable Human Feelings		
Merited Artiste	Jang In-hui	장인희	Director	Inseparable Human Feelings		
Kim Il Sung Prize	Pak Ho-il	박호일	Scriptwriter	Bright Sunshine		
	Ri Suk-gyong	리숙경	Scriptwriter	The Daisy Girl		
	Kim Song-rim	김성림	Scriptwriter	A Rice Flower		
	Ri Yun-ho	리윤호	Director	The Story of Our Home		
	Ha Kyong-chol	하경철	Camera operator	The Story of Our Home		
	Hwang Chol-jin	황철진	Scriptwriter	Devote Yourself		
	Han Jong-su	한정수	Director	Kye Wol Hyang		
	Ko Myong-chol	고명철	Camera operator	Small Playgrounf of a Primary School, An Urban Girl Comes to Get Married		
	Ri Ryong-u	리령우	Camera operator	Long-Awaited Father		
	Jong Yong-bom	정영범	Scriptwriter	Bulletproof Wall		
	Om Chang-gol	엄창걸	Director	Bulletproof Wall		
	Ra Jin-ho	라진호	Camera operator	Bulletproof Wall		
Merited Artiste	Choe Sin-suk	최신숙	Make-up artist	Bulletproof Wall		
	Kim Tae-yang	김대양	Camera operator	Chastisement		
	Kim Mun-sik	김문식	Director	Glow of the North		
	Ri Song-un	리성은	Director	Glow of the North		
	Kim Yong-jin	김영진	Camera operator	Glow of the North		
	Ri Kye-won	리계원	Scriptwriter			
	Rim Chun-hui	림춘희	Scriptwriter			
	Kim Chol-su	김철수	Director			
	Pak Un-ok	박은옥	Director			
	RI Song-chol	리성철	Director			
	Ryu Pyong-su	류병수	Director			
	Ryom Hyang-sun	렴향순	Director			
	Kang Ki-chol	강기철	Camera operator			
	Han Chol	한철	Camera operator			
	Kim Ha-ik	김하익	Camera operator			
	Ryu Chol-nam	류철남	Camera operator			
	Jo Jung-hwa	조정화	Narrator			
	Kim Chun-won	김춘원	Scriptwriter			
	Ri Yong-chun	리영춘	Scriptwriter			
	Jang Chol-su	장철수	Director			
	O Yong-rim	오영림	Scriptwriter			
	Ho Jong-yon	호정연	Scriptwriter			
	Kim Hyok-chol	김혁철	Scriptwriter			
	Ri Pong-hwa	리벙화	Scriptwriter			
	Ri Chol	리철	Director			
Kim Il Sung Prize	O Jin-hung	오진흥	Scriptwriter	The Story of a Blooming Flower, Nation and Destiny, Cannot Be Chained	Specializes in adaptions of true stories to cinema.	
Kim Il Sung Prize People's Artiste	Ri Chun Gu	리춘구	Scriptwriter, song writer	A Broad Bellflower, Nation and Destiny, The Fourteenth Winter, Traces of Life	Known for lengthy stories. Ri specializes in films featuring the stories of labour and workers. Ri also wrote lyrics to some of his films' themes.	
	Yun Yong-gil	윤영길	Director			
	Yu Ju-song	유주성	Director			
	Kim Jon-hyok	김전혁	Director			
	Kim Hyong-ho	김형호	Director			
	Ri Il-hyok	리일혁	Director			
	Pak Chol	박철	Director			
	Kang Chol	강철	Director			
	Kim Un-yong	김은영	Editor			
	Gwon Un	권은	Editor			
	Kim Song-hui	김성희	Composer		Film music composer	
	Min Yu-chol	민유철	Composer		Film music composer	
	Pak Jong-ho	박정호	Sound recordist			
	Ko Yu-mi	고유미	Sound recordist			
	Hong Son-hwa	홍선화	Singer		Singer for the Pyongyang Cinema and Radio Music Orchestra.	
Merited Artiste	Jang Un-ae	장은애	Singer	The Story of a Blooming Flower, My Happiness, The Letter	Singer for the Pyongyang Cinema and Radio Music Orchestra.	
People's Artiste	Choi Sam-suk	최삼숙	Singer	My Happiness, Traces of Life, The Fourteenth Winter	Singer for the Pyongyang Cinema and Radio Music Orchestra.	
Merited Artiste	Ri Kyong-hun	리경훈	Singer		Singer for the Pyongyang Cinema and Radio Music Orchestra.	
Merited Artiste	Kim Yun-mi	김윤미	Singer	Comrade Kim Goes Flying	Singer for the Pyongyang Cinema and Radio Music Orchestra.	
Merited Artiste	Kim Hui-ok	김희옥	Singer		Singer for the Pyongyang Cinema and Radio Music Orchestra.	
	Ko Yong-hui	고영희	Singer		Singer for the Pyongyang Cinema and Radio Music Orchestra.	
	Kim Su-yong	김유성	Singer		Singer for the Pyongyang Cinema and Radio Music Orchestra.	

== See also ==
- List of South Korean actresses
- List of South Korean male actors
- Cinema of North Korea
