= List of North Korean films =

This is a list of North Korean films and film series from 1945 to present. Films, and film parts or halves with names, that are part of film series or multi-part films are not included separately to keep the list shorter and more readable. For South Korean films from September 1948 see list of South Korean films. Earlier Korean films made during Japanese rule are in the list of Korean films of 1919–1948. For an alphabetical list of Korean-language films, see List of Korean-language films.

== List of films ==
Year(s)	English title (Note: This list uses Schönherr's list of translations for English titles of the movies. Official North Korean translations by Korea Film Export & Import Corporation(조선영화수출입사), such as the translations appearing in the book Korean film, are preferred in the rest of the cases.)	Original title	Director	Cast	Genre	Notes	Ref(s)
1946	Our Construction	우리의 건설			Documentary	First North Korean film. Due to lack of equipment at the time, the film is silent.	
1946	Democratic Election	민주 선거			Documentary	The film was a silent film.	
1947	People's Committee	인민 위원회			Documentary	The film was the first sound film in North Korea.	
1948	August 15th of 1947	1947년 8•15	Sang-in Cheon		Documentary		
1948	Victorious Democratic Election	승리의 민주 선거	Min chong sik		Documentary		
1948	Victorious May 1st	승리의 5•1절	Sang-in Cheon		Documentary		
1948	Growing Democracy	자라는 민주 모습	Ri su kun		Documentary		
1948	The Silent Star	홍광	Sang-in Cheon		Documentary		
1948	People's Army	인민군대	Chon dong min		Documentary		
1948	South and North Korea Meeting	남북 조선 년석회	Sang-in Cheon		Documentary		
1948	38th Parallel	38선	Kang Hong-sik		Documentary		
1948	Eternal Goodwill	영원한 친선	Min jong sik		Documentary		
1949	National Civil Service 3rd Congress 3	전국 민청 3차 대회 3	Kim ha yeon		Documentary		
1949	Shining Victory	빛나는 승리	Pyon dong wook		Documentary		
1949	Asian Women's union congress	아세아 녀맹 대회	Sang-in Cheon		Documentary	Film documenting the asian women's conference in 1949 in Beijing hosted by All-China Women's Federation and the WIDF	
1949	Foundation of the democratic nation	민주 건국	Sang-in Cheon		Documentary		
1949	Supung dam	수풍댐	Sang-in Cheon		Documentary		
1949	May 1st of 1949	1949년 5•1절	Yun duk chun		Documentary		
1949	August 15th of 1949	1949년 8•15	Cheon sang-in		Documentary		
1949	Epidemic encephalititis	류행성 뇌염	Pyon dong wook		Documentary		
1949	Song of goodwill	친선의 노래	Chong chun chae		Documentary		
1949	Trial of the Horim guerillas	호림부대 공판	Yun duk chun		Documentary		
1949	First national sports day	전국 제1차 체육절	Yun duk chun		Documentary		
1949	My Home Village	내 고향	Kang Hong-sik	Yu Wonjun, Yu Kyongae, Mun Yebong	War film	First North Korean feature film	
1950	The second World Festival of Youth and Students	제 2차 세계청년 학생축전	Cheon sang in		Documentary		
1950	February 8th of 1950	1950년 2•8절	Yun duk chun		Documentary		
1950	May 1st of 1950	1950년 5•1절	Kim Un-mong	Hong Il-sung	Documentary		
1950	Railroad of the mines	광산철도	Ri chun sop		Documentary		
1950	The Blast Furnace	용광로	Min Chongshik	Moon Ye-bong		Released during Korean War, the film is about workers trying to restore the blast furnace during the development of industry in north korea.	
1950	People protecting their posts	초소를 지키는 사람들	Joo In kyu			The film is about north korean soldiers who fight against the "invasion" by south korean soldiers during the korean war.	
1950	The Frontier Guards	국경수비대				Released during Korean War	
1951	Announcing to the World	세계에 고함	Sang-in Cheon		Documentary	Released during Korean War	
1951	Righteous War	정의의 전쟁	Sang-in Cheon		Documentary	Released during Korean War, the film is divided into three parts.	
1951	Rimsan	림산	Hong pil son		Documentary		
1951	Frontline of food	식량 전선	Min chong sik		Documentary		
1951	Prisoners crying for peace	평화를 부르짖는 포로들	Yun duk chun		Documentary		
1951	May 1st of 1951	1951년 5•1절	chong chun chae		Documentary		
1951	Boy Partisans	소년빨찌산	Yoon Yong-gyu	Moon Ye-bong		Released during Korean War, the film was a winner of the "fight for freedom award" in the 6th Karlovy Vary International Film Festival in 1951.	
1952	Armistice negotiations	정전담판	Hong pil son		Documentary		
1952	The Evil Night	악야				Shin Sang-ok's South Korean film made before his abduction by North Korea.	
1952	Again to the Front	또 다시 전선으로	Chon Sangin			Released during Korean War	The film was a winner of the "fight for freedom award" in the 7th Karlovy Vary International Film Festival in 1951.
1952	US Germ Warfare in Korea	미제의 세균만행			Documentary	Released during Korean War	
1952	People protecting the homeland	향토를 지키는 사람들	Yoon Yong-gyu				
1953	The Combat Unit of a Fighter Plane also known by its Chinese release name 'Dui Kong she ji zu(對空射擊組)'	전투기사냥군조 (also known as 비행기사냥군조) (Note: South Korean sources use the name 전투기, while North Korean sources use the name 비행기.)	Kang Hong Shik				
1953	Scouts	정찰병	Chon Dong-min	Pak Hak, Chon Unbong			
1954	Partisan Girl	빨치산처녀				First North Korean feature film made after the Korean War	
1954	Restoration of Pyongyang	평양시 복구	Cheon Sang-wol	Lee Myeong-je	Documentary		
1954	Korea	코리아	Shin sang ok				
1955	Marshal Kim Il-sung's Anti-Japanese Activities	김일성 원수 항일 유격 전적지	Kim Il-shin		Documentary		
1956	Never Can Live Like That	다시는 그렇게 살수 없다	Sang-in Cheon				
1956	The Road of Happiness	행복의 길	chon dong min, chon sang in				
1957	Orang Chon(or Orang River)	어랑천	Riyong Gyu Yun	Hak Su Kim, Hyo Gyong Dzo, Un Bong Che, Dzong Bok Mun, Sob Pak			
1957	3rd Party Congress	3차 당 대회			Documentary		
1958	Moranbong	모란봉				Korean-French co-production. Received the Special Award of Festival Organizing Committee at the 12th PIFF.	
1958	Geumgang Mountain	금강산			Documentary		
1959	Love the Future also known by its chinese name, "Yao ai mi lai(要愛未來)"	미래를 사랑하라	Cheon Sang In				
1959	The Tale of 15 Children	열다섯 명의 아이들 이야기			Feature Film	First commercial color film produced in North Korea	
1960s	The Family of Choe Hak Sin	최학신의 일가	O Pyong Chol	Pak Ki Ju		In two parts	
1961	Youth in Ship "Seagull"	갈매기호 청년들	Om Kil Son				
1962	A red agitator	붉은 선동원					
1962	The Tale of Hung Bu	흥부전					
1963	Paek Il Hong	백일홍					
1963	The red flower	붉은 꽃	Cheon sang-in				
1963	The Defenders of Height 1211	1211고지 방위자들	Ri Gi Song (리기성)				
1963	The Spinner	정방공(精紡工)	O Byong-cho				
1964	Long Live The Banner of the Republic	공화국 기치 만세				Released in two parts	
1964	Namgang Village Women	남강마을녀성들	Pak dae sik, Ham Un Bong				
1964	A tale of Noblemen	량반전					
1964–1965	The Path to Awakening	성장의 길에서	Om Kil-son			Released in two parts.	
1965	My Counter	나의 매대	An Mun-ha	Gilmyeong Han	Drama		
1965	Ongjongryon	온정령					
1965	Invisible front(Boidchi annun dchonson)	보이지 않는 전선					
1966	On the Railways	철길우에서					
1967	Naega cadshun gilThe Road I Found	내가찾은길	Seng In Chen	Kil-Son Om, Song Hye-rim, Pak Hak, In-sun Hon, Hak-mag Mun	Drama	The film was released on August 1970 in East Germany.	
1968	Sea of Blood	피바다	Choe Ik Gyu		Drama	Released in two parts. Based on an opera of same name.	
1968	The secret of the gold coin	금화의 비밀				Re-released on DVD in 2007.	
1969	Five Guerilla Brothers	유격대의 오형제	Om Kil-son				
1969	The Strange Radio Waves	수상한 전파					
1970	The Girl Barber	처녀리발사					
1970	A Flourishing Village	꽃피는 마을	Kim Yong Ho				
1970	We Are the Happiest	세상에 부럼없어라	Pak Hak, Kim Se Ryun				
1970	Mt. Jongbang	정방산	Baa-ek Up		Documentary		
1971	When Picking Apples	사과딸때			Drama		
1971	A Locomotive Engineer's Son	기관사의 아들					
1971	The Songs Sung on the Frontline	화선에서 부르던 노래					
1971	The Story of a Nurse	한 간호원에 대한 이야기					
1972	Flying Circus	공중무대					
1972	Flower Girl	꽃파는 처녀	Choe lk-gyu Pak Hak			Winner of Prix Special at the Karlovy Vary International Film Festival	
1972 or 1973	Black Rose	검은 장미					
1973	The Problem in Our Family	우리집 문제					
1975	A Fate of Kum Hui and Un Hui	금희와 은희의 운명	Om Kil-son				
1975	You've Taken Me Wrong	당신은 나를 잘못봤소					
1976	An Unforgettable Man (Ichulsu omnym saram)	잊을수없는 사람	Ki Mo Jung	Yae Yon Yung, Kyong Sun Yu, Tae Hyon Choe, In Hi U, Pyong Yun Kim	Action		
1977	A Fire Burning All Over the World	누리에 붙는 불				A film about Kim family members' Kang Pan Sok's and Kim Hyong Gwon's revolutionary deeds. It was also the first film in which Kim Il Sung was portrayed.	
1977	To the End of the Earth	이세상 끝까지					
1977	I'll Beat the Drum	북은 내가 치겠소					
1978	A Day at the Pleasure Ground	유원지의 하루					
1978	Centre Forward	중앙공격수	Kil-in Kim, Chong-Song Pak	In Son Cha	Sport Drama		
1978	Growth Hormone	성장호르몬 생산기술	Chae pung gi		Documentary		
mid 1970s to 1980s	My New Family	새 가정	Chae pung gi				
1978–1981	Unsung Heroes	이름 없는 영웅들		James Joseph Dresnok, Kim Ryong Rin, Kim Jong Hwa.		A multi-part serial made between 1978 and 1981. Also known as Unsung Heroes or Nameless Heroes	
Some time between 1979 and 1983	The Problem in My Wife's Parents' Home	처가집문제					
1979	Among the Conspirators	음모자들 속에서					
1979	An Jung Gung Shoots Ito Hirobumi	안중근 이등박문을 쏘다	Om Gil-son		Drama	Presented at the Karlovy Vary International Film Festival. Released in two parts. See An Jung-geun.	
1980	The Tale of Chunhyang (1980)	춘향전	Yu Won Jun, Yun Ryong Gyu	Kim Yong Suk, Choe Sun Gyu		See The Tale of Chunhyang (1935)	
1980	The Prosecutor Accuses	검사는 말한다					
1980	My new family	새 가정	Chae Pung Gi				
1980	The 14th Winter	열네번째 겨울					
1980	Aspect of Pyongyang	평양의 모습	Sao Beng Hyongsong		Documentary		
1981–1987	The Star of Korea	조선의 별	Om Kil Son			Released in eleven parts.	
1982	On the Juche Idea				Short film/Documentary	See Juche	
1982	Wolmi Island	월미도	Jo Kyong Sun	Choe Chang Su, Jo Kyong Sun, Choe Thae Hyon	Historical/War	See Wolmido	
1982	The Forest Sways	숲은 설레인다	Jang Yong Bok	So Kyong Sim, Kim Yong Suk	Drama		
1982	Song of Love	사랑의 노래	Rim Chang Bom	Ri Sol Ri, Kim Son Ok, Ri Song Sim	Romance		
1982	Notes of a War Correspondent	종군기자의 수기	Choe Bu Kil	Kim Kwang Bun, O Mi Ran, Kwak Myong So	War		
1982	The Road to the Front	전선길	류호선			Released in two-halves	
1983	Morning Star	새별		O Mi Ran			
1983	We Met Again on Mt. Myohyang	우리는 묘향산에서 다시 만났다				See Mt. Myohyang	
1983	The Girl We Met on Our Trip	운행길에서 만난 처녀					
1983	A New Legend on the Piryu	비류강의 새 전설					
1983	The Anti-Japanese Struggle					See anti-Japanese struggle	
1983	The People of Yangji Town	양지말 사람들		Shin Myong-uk		In two parts	
1984	An Ambitious Girl	꿈많은 처녀					
1984	Don't Wait for Us	우리를 기다리지 말라			War	Features North-Korean built planes based on the Il-2 and Il-10, models which were never used by the KPA.	
1984	A Hedgehog Defeats a Tiger	호랑이를 이긴 고슴도치			Children's film		
1984	An Emissary of No Return	돌아오지 않은 밀사	Shin Sang-ok	Kim Jun Sik, Ryang Hae Sung, Kim Yun Hong	Historical/Drama	Shin's first film in North Korea. Based on a stage play named Bloody Conference	
1984	Love, Love, My Love	사랑 사랑 내사랑	Shin Sang-ok	Choi Eun-hee, Jang Son Hui, Ri Hak Chol			
1984	Runaway	탈출기	Shin Sang-ok			Considered by Shin to be his best North Korean film	
1985	Breakwater	방파제	Shin Sang-ok				
1985	The Tale of 15 Children	열다섯소년에 대한 이야기			War movie	Released in two parts.	
1985	Pulgasari	불가사리	Shin Sang-ok	Jang Son Hui, Ham Ki Sop, Ri Jong Guk	Kaiju		
1985	Salt	소금	Shin Sang-ok	Choi Eun-hee		Choi won Best Actress award at Moscow Film Festival	
1985	The Tale of Shim Chong	심청전	Shin Sang-ok				
1985	The Outpost Line	전초선					
1985	After a Long Separation	헤여져 언제까지					
1985	Peony	목란꽃				Two part film	
1985	In Their Noble Image	그들의 모습에서					
1985	Run and Run	조선아 달려라					
1985	Kwangju Appeals	광주는 부른다	Jong Kon Jo	Kim Chol, Pak Mi Hwa, Choe Bong Sik	Historical	See Gwangju Uprising	
1985	Silver Hairpin	은비녀		Seo Gyeong Seop, Hong Yeong Hui		Co-production by the Korean Film Studio and Chongryon Film Studios.	
1985 or 1986	One Second for a Feat	영원한 전우	Om Kil Son, Eldor Urazbayev	Andrei Martynov, Chang su Choi and Oleg Anofriev	Adventure/War	Two part, DPR Korea/Soviet Union co-production	
1986	A Traffic Controller on Crossroads (a.k.a. Guards on the Crossing)	네거리초병					
1986	Thaw (Also known as Snow Melts in Spring)	봄날의 눈석이				Co-production by the Korean Film Studio and Chongryon Film Studios.	
1986	Hong Kil Dong	홍길동	Kim Kil-in	Chang Son Hui, Gwon Ri, Riyonun Ri, Yong Ho Ri, Kenpachiro Satsuma	Fantasy / Martial arts	First North Korean entertainment film	
1986	Order No. 027	명령 - 027호	Ki Mo Jung, Eung Suk Kim	Sung Chol Cha, Jeong Woon Kim	War		
1986	Let's Go to Mt. Kumgang	금강산으로 가자	Pak Sang Bok	Jo Myong Son, Kon Kong Hui, Kim Dong Sik		See Mt. Kumgang	
1986	Kangrung chonyowa Pyöngyang dzholmuni	강릉처녀와평양젊은이	Yong Bok Chang	Kuang Chun Ryu, Ryon-gu Nam and In-suk Ro			
1986	A Day Before	하루를 앞두고					
1986	Song of Retrospection	추억의 노래	Ryu Ho-son	Kim Jong Hwa, Yun Chan	Action & Adventure/ War		
1986	The Dear Nest	보금자리					
1986	The Tale of On Dal	온달전					
1986	Our Street	우리가 사는 거리					
1986	The Story of the Kayagum	가야금에 깃든 사연					
1987–1989	Rim Kkok Jong	림꺽정				Released in five parts	
1987	Brother in law and sister in law	시형과 제수					
1987	A Mother's Hope	어머니의 소원					
1987	An Architect's Story	한 건축가에 대한 이야기				Released in two parts.	
1987	A Bellflower	도라지꽃	Jo Kyong Sun	O Mi-ran, Sung Yon Ok, Kim Ryong Jo		Also known as A Broad Bellflower	
1987	A Country I Saw	내가 본 나라	Ko Hak Rim	Pak Ki Ju, Kim Ryong Rin, Pak Song		Released in five parts	
1987	My Happiness	나의 행복	Kim Yong Ho	Kim Jong Hui, Kim Ok Hui, Kim Kwang Ryol			
1988	From Spring to Summer	봄부터 여름까지	Nikita Orlov, San Bok Pak	Elena Drobysheva, Chkhol Kim, Yuriy Kuznetsov, Aleksey Buldakov, Gyen Sob So, Yen-gin Kim, Yun-hon Kim, Tõnu Mikiver		A Soviet Union-North Korea co-production.	
1988	Cradle	요람				Released in two parts.	
1988	Gandahar					French co-production.	
1988	Ten Zan – the Ultimate Mission	마지막임무	Ferdinando Baldi; Pak Jong-ju			Italian co-production.	
1988	Ask Yourself	자신에게 물어 보라	Pak Song Ju	So Kyong Sib, Kim Yong Suk, Ri Gun Ho	Drama	Screened during the 13th World Festival of Youth and Students	
1989	The Man Who Remained in My Heart	심장에 남는 사람					
1989	Traces of Life	생의 흔적				Released in two-halves. Received the Special Jury Award at the second PIFF.	
1989	What I Must Do	내가 설 자리					
1989	Hail Lim Su-kyung, the Flower of Unification	통일의 꽃 임수경				Documentary film Received the Gold Torch Prize at the second PIFF.	
1989–1995	A Life Full of Ups and Downs(also known as A Checkered Life)	곡절많은 운명				Released in four parts	
1990s	Fighting Animals	동물들의 싸움 or 야수들의 싸움			Nature documentary	At least 5 volumes of the documentary film series exist. It was made by the Korean Science Film Studio. In 2006 the documentary raised concern that animals at Korea Central Zoo were being mistreated.	
1990–1993	The Red Maple Leaves	붉은 단풍잎				Released in seven parts.	
1990	The Third Golden Medal	세번째 금메달					
1990	From 5p.m. to 5a.m.	5시부터 5시까지	Kim Yu Sam	Jong Ui Kyom, Kim Chol Hyon, Hyon Chang Kol	War		
1990	Prince Ho Dong and Princess of Raknang	호동왕자와 락랑공주			Children's film		
1990	The Shore of Salvation	'구원의 기슭	Arya-zhav Dashiev, Ryu-kho Son	Dmitry Matveev, Viktor Stepanov, Boris Nevzorov, Vitaly Serov, Aleksandr Slastin		The last Soviet Union-North Korea co-production.	
1990	A Happy Family with Songs	노래속에 꽃피는 가정					
1991	Harang and General Jin	하랑과 진장군				Released in two parts.	
1991	Girls in My Hometown	내고향의 처녀들	Pak Sang bok				
1991	The ear is ripening	이삭은 여물어간다					
1992–2003	Nation and Destiny	민족과 운명				Multi-part film released in 62 parts (58 in cinemas from 1992 to 2002, 3 in home video in 2003)	
1992	Sisters	자매들				The film is about three sisters living in Pyongyang whose father is a shoemaker.	
1992	Bird	새					
1992	The Story of a Blooming Flower	꽃에 깃든 사연	Ri Sang Gyu	Jang Yu Song, Kim Yong Suk, Pak Haeng Suk	Drama	The film tells a romanticised story of the creation of the Kimjongilia flower	
1992	A Far-Off Islet	멀리 있는 섬					
1993	They Met on the Taedong River	대동강에서 만난 사람들	Kim Kil In, Kim Kil Ha	Kim Ryong Rim, Han Kil Myong, Son Won Ju		Released in two parts	
1993	Daughter of War Veteran	로병의 딸					
1993	An Unattached Unit	소속없는 부대	Kang Jung Mo	Choe Bong Sik, Pyon Mi Hyang, Choe Thae Hyon			
1993	An Urban Girl Comes to Get Married	도시처녀 시집와요	Jong Yun and five others	Ri Kyong Hui, Ri Gun Ho, Kim Chun Nam	Romantic Comedy	Created by students of the Pyongyang University of Cinematic and Dramatic Arts.	
1993	The Secret of Nano Addition	나노첨가제의 비밀	Andrew Myeoson		Documentary	A multi-part documentary	
1994	My Mother Was a Hunter	어머니는 포수였다					
1994	Bears and Rabbits	곰동산과 토끼동산			Children's film		
1994	Always Working Together for the People	인민을위한길에언제나함께계셨습니다			Documentary		
1994	Unqualified Sense of Duty	보심록					
1994	An Obliging Girl	고마운 처녀	Jong Jin Jo, Jong Kwang Il			Kim Kyong Ae won best actress for her role in the film at the 4th PIFF	
1994	Bear's Hill and Rabbit's Hill	곰동산과 토끼동산			Children's film		
1994	Oh, Youth!	청춘이여!	Jon Jong Phal	Kim Yong Suk, Jang Yu Song, Hwang Song Ok	Comedy	Also known as Young People	
1995	Japanese Invasion in 1592	임진왜란				See Imjin War. Released in three parts	
1995	Stretcher Platoon Leader	담가소대장					
1995	Lightning and Thunder	번개와 우뢰	Kang Jung Mo	Ri Won Bok, Hyon Chang Kol, Jong Un Chan	War	Released in two parts	
1995	Two Soldiers	두병사					
1996	Two Families in Haeun-dong	해운동의 두 가정					
1996	He Is Still in the Ranks	그는 오늘도 대오에 서 있다				Documentary film Received the Bronze Torch Prize at the fifth PIFF.	
1996	My Father	나의 아버지		So Kyong Sop		Received the Special Award of Festival Organizing Committee at the fifth PIFF.	
1996	Quiet Front Line	고요한 전방			War		
1997	The World-famous Peak	천하제일봉			Documentary	Received the Gold Torch Prize at the 6th PIFF.	
1997	Myself in the Distant Future	먼 후날의 나의 모습	Jang In-hak	Kim Myong Mun, Kim Hye Kyong, Choe Chang Su	Drama	Received the Gold Torch Prize at the 6th PIFF.	
1997	Taehongdan responsible secretary	대홍단책임비서			Drama		In the 2023 version one of the actors was digitally replaced.The movie was released in six parts.
1998	Airman Kil Yong Jo	비행사 길영조					
1998	Trunks Grow from Roots	줄기는 뿌리에서 자란다				Released in two parts	
1998	Changes of Pyongyang During the Forced March	강행군길에서 변모된 평양	Chang Wu Feng				
1999	Forever in Our Memory(Chu uk sok eh Young won han ree ran)	추억속에 영원하리					
1999	The Earth of Love (also known as Affection-Permeated Land)	사랑의 대지				Released in two-halves	
2000	The End of the US Armed Spy Ship ''Pueblo''	미제무장간첩선 <<푸에블로>>호의 말로			Documentary	Based on the capture of the USS Pueblo	
2000	Korean Women's Costume, Chima and Jogori	조선치마저고리			Documentary	See Hanbok	
2000	Marathon Runner	달려서 하늘까지	Li Chju Ho		Drama	Based on the story of Jong Song Ok	
2000	Green Shoulder-Strap	푸른 견장					
2000	Mt. Chilbo, Noted Mountain of Korea	조선의 명산 칠보산			Documentary		
2000	Souls Protest	살아있는 령혼들	Kim Chun Song	Kim Chol, Kim Ryon Hwa, Ri Yong Ho	Historical drama		
2000	Respected Comrade Kim Jong Il Is a Great Thinker and Theoretician	경애하는 김정일동지는 위대한 사상리론가이시다					
2000	Earthquake – Moving Flat Mass	지진 움직이는 판덩이들	Taeng Hwuk		Documentary	A multi-part documentary.	
2000	Your Son Came Back	아들은 돌아왔다					
2001	The First Violin	제1바이올린수		Ryu Kyong Ae			
2001	Military Service	복무의 길					
2001	On the Green Carpet	푸른 주단우에서	Rim Chang-bom	Ri Yong Ho, Ri Kyong Hui, Rim Kum Suk	Romantic comedy		
2001	The Big-game Hunter	맹수사냥군					
2001	Welcome to Pyongyang Animal Park	어서오세요	Yoon Chan		Coming-of-age story		
2002	Historic Relics in Pyongyang	평양의 력사유적			Documentary		
2002	Footsteps	발걸음					
2002	In the Days of Creating Extravaganza "Arirang"	김일성상 계관작품 대집단체조와 예술공연 아리랑 창조의 나날			Documentary		
2002	Spirit of Korean Celadon	청자의 넋	Phyo Kwang	So Kwang, Kim Hye Kyong, Choe Sun Bok	Historical		
2002	The Blood Stained Route Map	피묻은 략패	Phyo Kwang	Ri Ryong Hun, Ri Yong Ho, Kim Hye Kyong	Martial Arts, Adventure	Released in two-halves	
2002	Their Life Continues	이어가는 참된 삶		O Mi Ran		Released in two parts.	
2003	Our Life	우리의 생명					
2003	Letters from hometown	고향의 편지					
2003	They were discharged soldiers	그들은 제대병사였다					
2003	The sound that calls me	나를 부르는 소리					The film is about the land reform that was conducted in South Hwanghae Province.
2003	Notes of a Woman Soldier	녀병사의 수기	Jang Kil Hyon	Kim Yun Mi, Ri Wol Suk, Pak Kum Byol	Military		
2003	My Last Home	내 삶이 닻을 내린곳	Hong Kwang Sun	Hyon Chang Kol, Ri Yong Nam, Ri Un Kyong			
2003	Mother's Happiness	어머니의 행복					
2003	Our Fragrance	우리의 향기	Jon Jong Pal	Jong Un Mo, Kim Un Yong, Ri Yun Su	Comedy		
2003	A Photo	한 장의 사진					
2003	Ding of Love	사랑의 종소리					
2004	The Turtle-ship, a Pride of Korean Nation	우리민족의 자랑 거북선			Documentary	See Turtle ship	
2005–2021	Keep Traffic Rules	교통질서를 잘 지키자요			Children's film	A multi-part film. The first part is named Chol Nam's Ball	
2005	Inheritance	유산				Released in two parts	
2005	They Were Common Fighters	그들은 평범한 전사들이였다					
2005	Empress Chung	왕후 심청	Nelson Shin			North-South co-production. Unusually for Korean film industry, the character voices were separately recorded in both North and South due to differences in dialect.	
2006	Crabs and a Crane	참게와 왁새			Children's film		
2006	Pyongyang International Film Festival				Documentary	See Pyongyang International Film Festival	
2006	Let's Prevent Bird Flu	조류독감을 미리 막자			Documentary		
2006	Pyongyang Nalpharam	평양 날파람	Phyo Kwang; Maeng Cheol-min	Ri Ryong Hun, Kim Hye Kyong, Ri Yun Su	Martial Arts		
2006	The Schoolgirl's Diary	한 녀학생의 일기	Jang In-hak	Pak Mi-hyang, Kim Chol, Kim Yong-suk		Also known in alternate titles A Schoolgirl's Diary and The Journal of a Schoolgirl. Distributed in limited release abroad.	
2007	Kang Ho Yong	강호영	Jong Yun	Kim Chol Nam, Rim Yong Ho, Ju Jin A	War		
2007	Reception of Metal Samples	금속표본들이 오는날			Children's film		
2007	Profitable Sea Cucumber Farming	실리가 큰 해삼양식			Documentary		
2007	A Butterfly and a Cock	나비와 수탉			Children's film		
2007	A Present from the Old Tree	나무할아버지가 준 선물			Children's film		
2007	Extraordinary Crime Against Humanity of the 20th Century	20세기 반인륜특대형범죄			Documentary		
2007	Swordtail Brothers	쏠치형제들			Children's film		
2007	The 25th April Spring Friendship Art Festival	제25차 4월의 봄 친선예술축전			Documentary		
2007	The Boy Takes Revenge	원쑤갚은 소년			Children's film		
2007	The Idle Pig	놀고먹던 꿀꿀이			Children's film		
2007	The Oriole's Song	꾀꼴새가 부른 노래			Children's film	Received the Prize for Best Composition at the 11th PIFF.	
2008	The Lieutenant of Those Days	그날의 중위	Pak Se Ung	Rim Yong Ho, Kim Ho Song, Kim Chong Kil	Military		
2008	Korean Traditional Dish-Ssukttok	민족음식 쑥떡			Documentary		
2008	Follow What We Are Doing	우리를 지켜보라					
2008	The Call of the Naval Port or Call of Naval Port	군항의 부름소리	Ri Myong Su	Thae Sang Hun, Pak Yong, Choe Yong Ho	Military		
2008	The Kites Flying in the Sky	저 하늘의 연	Phyo Kwang; Kim Hyon-chol	Kim Sun, Ryo Chol, Ri Kyong Hui			
2008	The Respected Comrade Supreme Commander Is Our Destiny	경애하는 최고사령관동지는 우리의 운명			Documentary		
2009	The Great Bear	북두칠성	Kim Kwang Hun	Ri Wol Suk, Rim Yong Ho, Choe Bong Sik	War		
2009	The White Birch of Mt. Paektu	백두의 봇나무	Phyo Kwang	Kim Un Yong, Ri Hui Yong, Hong Yong Hui			
2009	White Gem	백옥				Released in two parts Based on the final years of O Jin U	
2009	Lifeline	생명선					
2009	Distress	조난					
2009	A Day of Training	훈련의 하루					
2009	Song of the East Sea	동해의 노래				Released in two parts	
2009	Petition	청원					
2009	Let Us Take Medicine in Time	꼭 지키자요			Children's film, Educational film		
2009	This Is My Hometown	여기는 내 고향					
2009	The Name Given by the Era	시대가 주는 이름	Kim Hyon Chol				
2010	The Poplar Company	황철나무중대					
2010	Sŏlp'unggyŏng	설풍경					
2010	Along the Climbing Route of Love for People	인민사랑의 등산길을 따라			Documentary		
2010	Never Gave Up the Future	미래를 포기하지 않았던 사람들	Park Yeong‐I			Documentary film produced by Chongryon. Received the Prize for Best Composition at the 12th PIFF.	
2010	My Family	내가 사는 가정	Kim Won Ha	Yun Hyang Chun, Ryu Kyong Ok, Jong Un Sil			
2010	Our Political Instructor	우리 정치지도원					
2010	Bright Sunshine	해빛 밝아라				Released in two parts. Also known as Lovely Sunshine	
2010	The Wheels of Happiness	행복의 수레바퀴					
2010	Brotherly Feeling or Brother's Feelings	형제의 정					
2010	Mt. Kuwol, A Scenic Spot by the West Sea of Korea	서해명승구월산			Documentary	See Mt. Kuwol	
2010	Along the Climbing Route of Love for People	인민사랑의 등산길을 따라			Documentary		
2011	Wish	소원					
2011	Brighter is our Future	우리의 래일은 더 푸르다	Kim Yong	Kim Chol-nam			
2011	Case Closed	미결건은 없다	Chong Yong-min	Choe Kyong-hui		Crime film	
2011	Do People Know You	인민이 너를 아는가	Ri Kwan-am	Mun Jong-ae			
2011	Flower in Snow	눈속에 핀 꽃	Kim Hyon Chol	Sin Yong Ni, Ryo Chol, Kim Yong Suk			
2011	The Morning Glow of the Countryside	산촌에 피는 노을	Jong Song Jin, Kang Rim, Ri Myong Chol, Kim Hwa Song	Kim Rye Kyong, Pak Jin Hyok, Han Song I		Created by students	
2012 (Note: Sometimes misattributed to 2018, due to its screening at the 2018 Pyongchang film festival)	The Other Side of the Mountain, also known as The Day the Mountain Cried (Note: The Day the Mountain Cried was the English title for the 2018 release.)	산 너머 마을	Joon Bai, Jang In Hak	Hyang Suk Kim, Ryung Min Kim, Jung Taik Park	War	A joint American-Chinese-North Korean production	
2012	Comrade Kim Goes Flying	김동무는 하늘을 난다	Kim Gwang Hun, Nicholas Bonner, Anja Daelemans		Romantic comedy	A joint British-Belgian-North Korean production. Received the Award for Best Director at the 13th PIFF.	
2012	The Daisy Girl	들꽃소녀					
2012	A Promise Made in Pyongyang	평양에서의 약속				Chinese-Korean co-production. Received the Special Award of Festival Organizing Committee at the 13th PIFF.	
2012	The Explosive Remover	폭발물처리대원	Ri Song Phil	Pae Won Kil, Hyon Chang Kol, Ri Wol Suk			
2012	Kim Ok Song, War Composer	종군작곡가 김옥성				Divided into two parts.	
2015	Rice Flower	벼꽃	Sim Yong Hak, Jong Bok Nam	Yun Su Kyong, Kim Kyong Ae, Kim Song Chol		Movie is about the leader of a collective farm.	
2016	The Story of Our Home	우리 집 이야기	Ri Yun-Ho, Ha Yong Ki	Jang Sun Yong, Won Yong-Sil	Drama	Received the Prize for Best Actress and the Grand Prix at the 15th PIFF.	
2019	Feats of the Rainbow	무지개의 기적			Documentary	Documentary film produced by Chongryon. Received the Special Jury Award at the 17th PIFF. Film covers North Korean schools in Japan.	
2019	A Great Harmonious Family	화목한 대가정			Documentary	Received the Award for Best Documentary at the 17th PIFF.	
2019	A shining history of victory achieved through one's own efforts	자력으로 승리떨쳐온 빛나는 력사			Documentary(Propaganda)		
2020	Mixed forest	혼성림			Documentary		
2022	A Day and a Night(also known as "one day one night")	하루낮 하루밤	Pak Kyong Jin	Kim Ryu Kyong, Pak Song Uk, Choe Song		Character is based on the real story of the Hero Ra Myong Hui. Released for the 110th birth anniversary of Kim Il Sung.	
2024	72 Hours	72시간	Ri Yun Ho	Kang Dok, Hyon Jong Hun, Sin Kwang Song, Choe Hyon	War	Film about the occupation of Seoul in three days during the Korean War. Divided into two parts. Released for the 70th anniversary of the Korean Armistice Agreement.	
2024	Zelkova trees are good for roadside tree arrangements	가로수조성에 좋은 느티나무			Documentary		
2025	Days and Nights of Confrontation	대결의 낮과 밤			drama	sequel to the 2022 film one day one night	
2025	Waste materials of the human body and health	인체의 로폐물과 건강			documentary		
2025	Near-infrared polarization therapy device good for disease treatment	질병치료에 좋은 근적외선편광치료기			documentary		

== See also ==
- Cinema of North Korea
- List of North Korean television series
- On the Art of the Cinema
