= List of Korean television series =

List of Korean television series may refer to:

- List of North Korean television series
- List of South Korean television series

== See also ==
- List of North Korean actors
- List of South Korean actors
- List of North Korean films, for North Korean multi-part films series
