= Choe Chang Su =

North Korean actor (1942–2020)

Hero of Labour People's Artiste of the DPRK Choe Chang Su
- 최창수
- Born: May 15, 1942; Yonho-dong, Songjin, North Hamgyong Province, Korea, Empire of Japan
- Died: February 10, 2020 (aged 77); North Korea
- Resting place: Patriotic Martyrs' Cemetery
- Occupation: Actor
- Notable work: Nation and Destiny
- Children: 5

Korean name
- Hangul: 최창수
- Hanja: 崔昌洙
- RR: Choe Changsu
- MR: Ch'oe Ch'angsu

Choe Chang Su (Korean: 최창수; 15 May 1942 - 10 February 2020) was a North Korean actor.

== Early life and career ==
Choe was born on 15 May 1942 in Yonho-dong of Songjin (today knows as Kimchaek), North Hamgyong Province of Japanese-occupied Korea. Choe was born in a family of eleven, quickly losing his siblings and parents due to the Japanese occupation of Korea and the subsequent Korean War. Choe worked different jobs as a young adult, working at the Kyongsong Ceramics Factory from 1959 to 1962, and as a security officer in Kyongsong County until some time in the 1960s.

== Film career ==
Choe would go on to follow an acting course, and become an actor at the Korean Film Studio, eventually receiving his first lead role in the 1966 film The Family of Choe Hak Sin (최학신의 일가). Other major roles in his career would include Yong Su and Yong Ok Visiting Their Socialist Homeland (사회주의 조국을 찾은 영수와 영옥이, 1969), The Fourteenth Winter (열네번째 겨울, 1980), Wolmido (월미도, 1982), The Story of a Squadron Commander (한 지대장의 이야기, 1983), and Rim Kkok Jong (림꺽정, 1986-1993).

In 1992, Choe would take on was is described as the "climax" of his career, the role of Choe Hyon Dok (based on Choe Deok-sin) in the first four chapters of the film series Nation and Destiny. The film series was extremely important to the North Korean government, with the series being described as "the work of summing up the Juche-based literature and art in the 20th century." Kim Jong Il, who would succeed his father in 1994, would say about the first chapters of Nation and Destiny: "[...] among our male film actors, the three stars are those who played Choe Hyon Dok [actor: Choe Chang Su], Yun Sang Min [actor: So Kyong-sop] and Cha Hong Gi [actor: Pak Ki Ju]." The first two parts of Nation and Destiny, which starred Choe Chang Su in the lead role, would go on to win the Golden Torch Award at the 1992 Pyongyang International Film Festival.

In the mid-1990s, Choe would take up administrative positions, becoming director of the acting department of the Korean Film Studio, and vice chairman of the Central Committee of the Korean Film Workers' Union. In 2006, Choe became a professor at the Pyongyang University of Dramatic and Cinematic Arts, also heading its film production team.

During his career, Choe was awarded the titles of Merited Artiste in 1980, People's Artiste in 1983, and Hero of Labour in 1992.

== Death and legacy ==
Choe died at his home from "an acute convulsion of the intestines" on 10 February 2020 at the age of 77. North Korean Leader Kim Jong Un, and the Central Committee of the Workers' Party of Korea sent a wreath of flowers to the bier of Choe.

In an obituary printed in The Pyongyang Times, fellow actors were quoted about Choe's acting skill. Actress An Chang Sun said, "It is a single expression of stardom to which he was elevated as a film actor." Fellow professor and veteran actress Kim Jong Hwa said, "Choe played such a big yet fine role as Ri Thae Un in Wolmi Island, Rim Kkok Jong in the namesake feature and Choe Hyon Dok in multi-part film The Nation and Destiny. It was his charm." After death, Choe continues to be an inspiration for film students. A student said, "It is my dream to be a film star like Choe Chang Su, Labour Hero and People's Artiste, who added lustre to the Korean moviedom."

== Filmography ==
Year	Title (English)	Title (Korean)
1966	The Family of Choe Hak Sin Parts 1-2	최학신의 일가
1969	Yong Su and Yong Ok Visiting Their Socialist Homeland	사회주의 조국을 찾은 영수와 영옥이
1972	The Story of the Pothong River	보통강반에 깃든 이야기
1980	The Fourteenth Winter Parts 1-2	열네번째 겨울
1982	For Higher Ground	더 높은 곳으로
1982	Wolmido	월미도
1983	Year of Reversals	전환의 해
1983	The Story of a Squadron Commander	한 지대장의 이야기
1984	Pioneers Parts 1-2	개척자들
1984	Runaway	탈출기
1985	The Eternal Comrade-in-Arms	영원한 전우
1986-1993	Rim Kkok Jong Parts 1-5	림꺽정
1987	The Place Where We Meet	우리가 만나는 곳
1988	Their Day	그들의 하루
1990	The People Whom I Met	내가 만난 사람들
1990	Longing for Sunshine Parts 1-2	해빛이 그리워
1990	A Tough Tree	억센 나무
1991	The Great Heart	큰 심장
1991-1997	The Japanese Invasion of 1592 Parts 1-3	임진왜란
1992	Nation and Destiny Parts 1-4: Choe Hyon Dok	민족과 운명
1994	Nation and Destiny Parts 17-18: Ho Jong Sun	민족과 운명
1996	The Master's Heart Parts 1-2	주인된마음
1997	Myself in the Distant Future	먼 후날의 나의 모습
1999	Embers	불씨

== See also ==
- Kim Ryong-lin
- So Kyong-sop
