= Kim Ryong-lin =

North Korean actor (1936–2015)

Kim Il Sung Prize Laureate People's Artiste of the DPRK Kim Ryong-lin
- 김룡린
- Born: 29 July 1936; Pungsan-ri, North Hamgyong Province, Japanese-ruled Korea
- Died: June 2015 (aged 78); North Korea
- Occupation: Actor · director
- Years active: 1963–2000s
- Known for: Unsung Heroes

Korean name
- Hangul: 김룡린
- RR: Gim Ryongrin
- MR: Kim Ryongnin

Kim Ryong-lin (Korean: 김룡린; 29 July 1936 – June 2015) was a North Korean actor and director. A recipient of the Kim Il Sung Prize and honored with the title of People's Artiste, he appeared in over 100 films across his career. Along with Choe Chang Su and So Kyong-sop, he was considered one of the three greatest North Korean actors.

== Biography ==
Kim was born on 29 July 1936 in Pungsan-ri, Hoeryong, North Hamgyong Province, Korea, Empire of Japan. He came from a family of teachers and attended Kyongsong Senior Middle School No. 1, where he graduated in 1956. After receiving his education, he served as a tunnel worker at the Kyongsong Coal Mine and a lumberjack for the Kyongsong Forestry Enterprise. In 1959, Kim enrolled at Pyongyang University of Theatre and Film in the school's Department of Acting, which started his acting career.

Kim joined the Korean Art Film Studio in 1963, that year starring as a country party secretary in the film Son of the Earth (대지의 아들). Over the next several decades, he became one of the most famous actors in the country, appearing in over 100 films and having over 80 leading roles. Among his most notable roles were as Jun Ho in Five Guerilla Brothers (유격대의 오형제, 1968), Dal Sam in Sea of Blood (피바다, 1969), Du Sok in The Flowering Village (꽃피는 마을, 1970), Chol Ryong in The Flower Girl (꽃파는 처녀, 1972), Choe Kyong Un in Flames Spreading Over the Land (누리에 붙는 불, 1977), Yu Rim in Unsung Heroes (이름없는 영웅들, 1978–1981), Hyong Chol in Snow Melts in Spring (봄날의 눈석이), Won Sok Hae in Guarantee (보증, 1986), and Dae Sik in Nation and Destiny (민족과 운명). His role in Unsung Heroes is one of his most well-known, where he played the protagonist, a spy who is tasked with gathering intelligence on the U.S. Forces, in each of the 20 chapters in the film series. In an 1981 interview, Kim remarked that people had begun calling him Yu Rim instead of his real name after the series began, which he enjoyed because of his admiration for the character.

Kim was honored with the title of People's Artiste in 1979, and, in 2000, was awarded the Kim Il Sung Prize for his role in the film People of Jagang Province (자강도 사람들), becoming the first actor to receive the honor. His performance in the film received praise from Supreme Leader Kim Jong Il, who said Kim "played the lead role exceptionally well. Comrade Ryong-lin has been a longtime friend of mine since our youth". In addition to acting, Kim served as the director of several films, including Red Mountain Ridge (붉은 산마루, 1986), Mother's Heart (어머니의 마음, 1986), and Where We Meet (우리가 만나는 곳, 1987). He also led an acting troupe at the Korean Art Film Studio.

Kim, along with Choe Chang Su and So Kyong-sop, was considered one of the three greatest North Korean actors. The Joseon Local History Encyclopedia described him as someone who "possessed all the qualities required of an actor. He stood unrivaled in terms of the number of films he appeared in, his acting prowess, and the diversity of roles he undertook". An article by the Korean American National Coordinating Council noted that he had "a humble attitude and a flexible mindset that allowed him to accept meaningful feedback ... [and] his popularity continued to grow even as he aged". According to the government-run Korean Central News Agency (KCNA), his success was through his "ability to quickly grasp a character's inner world and complex psychology, bringing the role to life with vivid authenticity".

Kim was honored with the Order of the National Flag first class, and the Order of Labour. He was married to Kang Yo-son, who held the title of Merited Artiste. He died in June 2015, at the age of 78. A floral tribute was sent by Supreme Leader Kim Jong Un, and the KCNA, in announcing his death on 20 June, reported, "Comrade Kim Jong-un expressed deep condolences over the passing of Kim Ryong-lin, a laureate of the Kim Il Sung Prize and a 'People's Artiste' who served as an actor at the Korean Art Film Studio."
