= North Korean films =

Articles on North Korean films include:

- Cinema of North Korea
- List of North Korean films
