= The Kites Flying in the Sky =

- Hangul: 저 하늘의 연
- RR: Jeo haneurui yeon
- MR: Chŏ hanŭrŭi yŏn
- Directed by: Phyo Kwang; Kim Hyon-chol
- Release date: 16 February 2008
- Running time: 88 minutes
- Country: North Korea
- Language: Korean

The Kites Flying in the Sky (Korean: 저 하늘의 연; sometimes rendered as 하늘을 나는 연들 (Note: Despite the original Korean title of the film being 저 하늘의 연, a re-translation into Korean of the film's English title seemed to be mentioned when the film screened in foreign film festivals outside North Korea)) is a 2008 North Korean film. Directed by Phyo Kwang and Kim Hyon-chol, the film is based on the true story of a former marathon champion (Note: The bit about the marathon champion seems to be an original addition in the film, as the woman is only considered as a person who raised orphans.) who devotes her life to caring for orphans.

The film was unusual in that no reshoots were required prior to approval for release.

== The film's basis ==
The film modelled the protagonist after North Korean woman Sŏ Hyesuk, who, according to the North Korean periodical "Tongil sinbo", is widely known as the "maternal hero" for the Songun era. Sŏ, a resident of Sŏn'guja-dong, Mangyongdae-guyok, Pyongyang, is known to have raised 33 orphans as if they were her own and sent 15 of them to the military.

== Plot ==
A woman born in a foreign land, who also experienced the death of her father, achieves her dream to be a marathon champion in North Korea. North Korea goes through an "Arduous March", and she raises the orphans during that time.

== Premiere and screening ==
The film officially premiered on 16 February 2008, and was the first film to be shown on television prior to a general release in June.

The Kites Flying in the Sky won an award for special screening at the 11th Pyongyang International Film Festival, where it was the only North Korean feature film to be screened that year.

The film was also screened at the 2013 Sydney International Film Festival(SIFF).

== Reception ==
=== Domestic reaction ===
The March 1st edition of the North Korean periodical "Tongil sinbo" said that the film "touchingly showcases the profound philosophical idea that the true value of human life and happiness in the Songun era lies in the dedication to the society and the group and those who follow those very ways will eternally shine into a vivid artistic drawing."

=== Foreign evaluations ===
Despite local success, the film was poorly received by American critics, who dismissed it as "syrupy and propagandistic".
