= Kim Se Ryun =

North Korean screenwriter (1928–1998)

Kim Seryun
- 김세륜
- Born: August 11, 1928; Unjon County, Heianhoku Prefecture, Korea, Empire of Japan
- Died: February 27, 1998 (aged 69)
- Burial place: Patriotic Martyrs' Cemetery
- Occupation: Screenwriter
- Years active: 1962–1990s

Kim Se Ryun (Korean: 김세륜; August 11, 1928 – February 27, 1998) was a North Korean screenwriter who specialized in the comedy genre. He was a recipient of the Kim Il Sung Prize and title of Labor Hero.

== Biography ==
Kim was born on August 11, 1928, in Unjon County, North Pyongan Province during the Japanese occupation of Korea. He later lived in Seoul for a brief period with his family and went to college there, but left to serve as a volunteer soldier upon the Korean War commencing in 1950. His family remained in South Korea during and after the war; Kim's experiences of being a defector from South Korea to the North and separated from his family due to the Korean War later inspired his script for the 1979 drama film Blood Relative.

Shortly after the war ended, Kim worked at the Pyongyang City Theater. He started his career as a screenwriter at the Korean Film Literature Creation Company in 1962. His first script, entitled The Girl Skipper, was published in 1963.

Kim gained fame for pioneering North Korea's comedy film genre during the mid-1960s. According to the July 2002 issue of the North Korean magazine Korean Art, the characteristics of his comedy works were "above all, beautifully singing the socialist reality with an optimistic smile and praising a hopeful future." The publication considered him equal to Charlie Chaplin as a comedian.

Among his scripting credits outside of the comedy genre are When Picking Apples (1971), a socialist reality film which received positive reviews in China, Blood Relative (1979), Pulgasari (1985; with Ri Chun-gu who was uncredited), Hong Kil-dong (1986), the Rim Kkok Jong film series (1986–1993), and Bird (1992). He was working at Shin Films for Shin Sang-ok in the 1980s. In December 1992, he earned the Kim Il Sung Prize and the title of a "Labor Hero" for participating in the creation of the Nation and Destiny film series.

In 1993, he wrote the script for the two-part comedy film They Met on the Taedong River, which at the time was the most expensive film produced in North Korean cinema's history.

Kim died on February 27, 1998, at the age of 69. According to the Korean Central News Agency in 2014, he was buried at the Patriotic Martyrs' Cemetery in Pyongyang.

== Filmography ==
- The Girl Skipper (1963)
- A Worker University Student (1964)
- The Joyful Stage (1966)
- We Have Nothing to Envy (1970)
- The Wife's Workplace (1970)
- Two Foremen and Two Soldiers (1971)
- When We Pick Apples (1971)
- Flying Circus (1972)
- The Songs Sung at the Frontline (1972)
- The Road to the Hometown (1973)
- The Sandfish Incident (1974)
- A Day at the Pleasure Park (1975)
- After the Rain Stops (1978)
- Boasting Too Much (1978)
- The Day Our Brother-In-Law Came (1978)
- Flesh and Blood (1979)
- The First Birthday Party (1979)
- How Do You Do? (1979)
- Our Rewarding Lives (1980)
- Tomorrow Will Last Forever (1985)
- Run and Run (1985)
- Hong Kil Dong (1986)
- Rim Kkok Jong Parts 1-5 (1986–1993)
- The Favourite Young Man (1988)
- Nation and Destiny Parts 9-10: Cha Hong Gi (1992) [with Choe Sang Gun, Sin Sang Ho, Ri Chun Gu, and Jang Rye Sun]
- Bird (1992)
- They Met on the Taedong River (1993) [with Jang Kwang Nam]
