= Ukishima Maru =

1937–1945 Japanese transport vessel

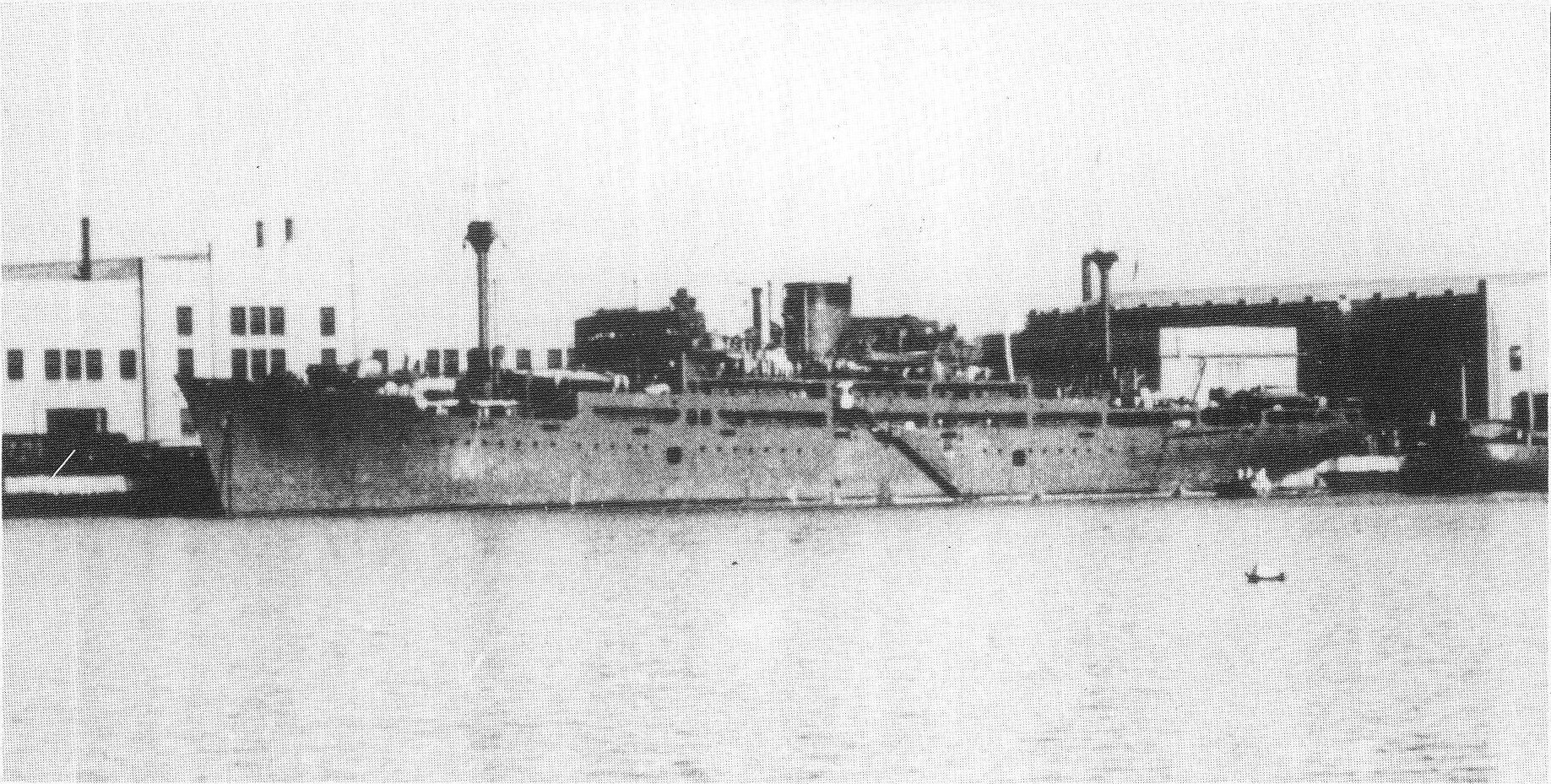

History

Japan
- Name: Ukishima Maru (浮島丸)
- Owner: Osaka Shosen Kaisha Lines
- Operator: Imperial Japanese Navy from Sep. 1941
- Port of registry: Osaka, Japan
- Builder: Mitsui Tama Shipyard
- Launched: March 1937
- Fate: Sank 24 August 1945

General characteristics
- Tonnage: 4,731 GRT
- Length: 108.43 m
- Beam: 15.70 m
- Depth: 9.75 m
- Capacity: 219 tons; 677 passengers
- Crew: 89

Ukishima Maru was a 4,731-ton Japanese naval transport vessel originally built as a passenger ship in March 1937. On 24 August 1945, while on a trip to repatriate Koreans in the wake of World War II, it exploded and sank in the harbor of Maizuru, Kyoto Prefecture. The sinking caused controversy in Korea and became the subject of documentaries films years later, such as the 2000 the North Korean film Souls Protest.

== Service prior to sinking ==
The vessel was originally used as a passenger transport between Osaka and Okinawa. The Imperial Japanese Navy requisitioned it in September 1941 and primarily employed it on a routing between Aomori and Hakodate, connecting the main islands of Honshu and Hokkaido.

== Final voyage and sinking ==
Japan surrendered to the United States on 15 August 1945. Seven days later, on 22 August, Ukishima Maru departed Ominato in Aomori Prefecture, bound for Pusan. The number of people aboard the ship is disputed. Although the Japanese government officially recorded 3,735 passengers and 225 Japanese crew, there have been estimates of as many as 10,000 Koreans on board.

=== Detour to Maizuru ===
Two days before the ship's departure, General Douglas MacArthur, still in the Philippines, ordered all Japanese ships over 100 tons to report their positions to the nearest Allied radio station and proceed to the nearest Allied port no later than 6:00 p.m. on 24 August, following which the Japanese government issued an order declaring it illegal for Japanese ships to be out of port after 6:00 p.m. on 24 August. According to the ship's communication officer, Ukishima Maru did not receive this message until the morning of 24 August. Other accounts maintain that the ship's captain received the order prior to departure from Ominato. Ukishima Maru arrived at Maizuru around 5:20 p.m. on 24 August.

=== Explosion ===
The harbor at Maizuru had been extensively mined by the United States in the final weeks of the war, and after its surrender Japan had the responsibility to clear the harbor of mines. Although at least ten other vessels safely entered the harbor on 24 August, the harbor was not declared completely safe from mines until 1952.

The Japanese government officially reported that Ukishima Maru struck an American mine in Maizuru Harbor and exploded, but the accuracy of the report was contested by numerous Koreans including the survivors from the incident, who viewed the explosion as a deliberate action by the Japanese imperial government.

According to eyewitness accounts from seven Korean survivors, Japanese marines threw documents and other items off the ship, and some marines left the ship in a smaller boat before the explosion. Survivor Jeong Gi-young also stated that he overheard the Japanese marines, who were looking at the woman feeding her baby on board and said it was such a pity that the baby was going to die soon at young age without ever fully blooming. Kang Yi-sun, also the survivor from the incident, stated that he witnessed many Japanese marines on the ship strangely running to the engineering room and disappearing prior to the explosion. Survivor Jang Yeong-do recalled that the rumor, which said that the ship was going to explode if it was to change its course from Busan, was already circulating around the vessel.

In 2016, a team from the Research Institute of Korean and Japanese Cultural Studies led by Kim Moon-gil obtained the document of the Japanese government instructing ships including Ukishima Maru to discard loaded explosives less than three hours prior to the departure. With neither witness accounts nor records of the explosives ever being discarded from the ship, Kim and others suggest that Ukishima Maru likely left with the explosives on board. Kim also argued that only 25 out of 300 Japanese crews on board died compared to the thousands of the Korean passengers who were never officially reported, suggesting that many Japanese crews were aware of the planned explosion and escaped by boats as the Korean survivors witnessed. Meanwhile, the Korean passengers were unaware and thus killed in much large number by the sudden explosion.

According to the incident report the team also found in 2019, a Japanese naval admiral told the officers of the ship to sacrifice their lives by completing the duty when the officers protested that they did not want to sail through the dangerous area.

The explosion and sinking killed 524 Koreans and 25 Japanese on board according to Japanese government figures. Unofficial estimates of the death toll vary and are as high as 6,000. Part of the reason for the discrepancy, according to historian Mark Caprio, is that the official numbers did not count bodies that sunk with the ship.

Around 900 survivors returned to Korea after the incident by traveling to Yamaguchi Prefecture and boarding other repatriation ships there.

== Legacy ==
=== Official response ===
The sinking was first reported in the Korean press on 18 September, and in the Japanese press on 8 October.

The United States occupation authorities collected several Korean accounts in the wake of the incident which described it as a "wholesale killing of Korean civilians," but dismissed them as hearsay. In July 1946, the US authorities concluded that there was not enough evidence to carry the investigation further.

Shortly after the incident, the Japanese government offered compensation of up to 1,550 yen to families of victims, but at the time they were only capable of paying this compensation to families living in Japan as there was no means of transferring money to Korea. An internal Japanese foreign ministry document in 1950 described the explosion as an accident, characterized the repatriation mission as an act of "goodwill" by the Imperial Navy and stated that "any moves to seek compensation by accusing the navy cannot be accepted at all."

In 1965, Japan and South Korea signed a Treaty of Basic Relations that established a $364 million compensation fund for victims of colonial occupation. After this treaty was signed, Japan stopped accepting compensation claims from victims, but the South Korean government offered compensation payments of 30,000 won from the fund in the mid-1970s.

The Japanese government interred the remains of 521 victims at the temple of Yutenji in Meguro, Tokyo in 1971. Some of these remains were returned to Korea in the early 1970s, but the remains of 280 victims remained at Yutenji as of December 2022.

Eighty South Koreans, including the survivors and relatives of the incident's victims, filed a lawsuit against the Japanese government in 1992 seeking monetary compensation, an official apology, and return of nineteen victims' remains from Japan to South Korea. In 2001, the Kyoto District Court ordered the Japanese government to pay ¥45 million to 15 South Koreans, including the survivors and relatives of the victims from the incident, ruling that the Japanese government had failed in its duty to transport passengers safely, but rejected the demands for official apologies and return of the victims' remains. The entire decision was rejected on appeal in 2003 by the High Court of Osaka, and the rejection was upheld by the Supreme Court of Japan in 2004, resulting in no legal redress for the plaintiffs.

The Roh Moo-hyun government investigated the incident between 2004 and 2008 as part of its truth and reconciliation efforts.

In December 2022, citizens' groups from Tokyo, Maizuru, and Aomori petitioned the Japanese government to return the victims' remains at Yutenji to Korea.

=== Salvage ===
Incomplete salvage attempts were carried out in 1950 and 1954, which recovered some remains from the shipwreck.

=== Memorials ===
An annual memorial service was held in Maizuru starting in 1954, and a monument to the tragedy was sculpted by a local Japanese schoolteacher between 1977 and 1978. The monument now stands in the Ukishima-maru Victims Memorial Park.

Annual memorial services at the ship's departure site in Ominato have been held since 1994, and a permanent information board was erected at the site in 2012.

=== Media ===
- Asian Blue: the Ukishima-maru Incident (1995) – Japanese film depicting the incident
- Souls Protest (2000) – North Korean film depicting the incident
