= List of Korean actors =

List of Korean actors may refer to:

- List of North Korean actors
- List of South Korean actresses
- List of South Korean male actors
