= Spirit of Korean Celadon =

- Hangul: 청자의 넋
- Hanja: 靑瓷의 넋
- RR: Cheongjaui neok
- MR: Ch'ŏngjaŭi nŏk
- Directed by: Phyo Kwang
- Release date: 2002
- Running time: 137 minutes
- Country: North Korea
- Language: Korean

Spirit of Korean Celadon (Korean: 청자의 넋) is a 2002 North Korean film directed by Phyo Kwang. A drama with "fun, unconventional musical sequences", the film is set during the Goryeo period and tells the story of a craftsman devoted to making traditional Korean celadon.

Spirit of Korean Celadon was one of three North Korean films shown at the Special Screening section of the 6th Jeonju International Film Festival, held in South Korea from 28 April–6 May 2005.

== Cast ==
- Sol jirok - artisan master of the celadon played by Merited actor Cho myong son, he is wrongfully accused of selling the celadon to the japanese but is later acquitted.
- Sol chong -adopted son and apprentice of Sol jirok played by Ri song kwang
- Sol so na -family of Sol chong played by Kim ryon hwa
