= Walking to School =

- Directed by: Peng Chen, Peng Jiahuang
- Screenplay by: Peng Cheng
- Produced by: Jiang Xiaorong
- Starring: Ding Jiali; Anamuling
- Cinematography: Li Yixu
- Edited by: Zhou Ying
- Music by: Ruan Kunshen
- Production companies: Film Bureau State Administration Of Radio Film & TV
- Distributed by: Shenzhen New Classic
- Release date: 2009
- Country: China
- Language: Mandarin

Walking to School (Mandarin: 走路上学 | English: Zou lu shang xue) is a 2009 Chinese film directed by Peng Chen and Peng Jiahuang and starring Ding Jiali and Anamuling. The film was screened at the Shanghai International Film Festival and won awards at the Pyongyang International Film Festival and the 11th Abuja International Film Festival.

== Plot ==
In a village in the Yunnan province of Southern China, going to school is a treacherous and hard task for the local Lisu people and involves sliding over a narrow valley between hills or mountains, typically with steep rocky walls and a stream running through it via a cable. Two siblings – consisting of an elder sister Naxiang and her younger brother Wawa – lived in the village. Naxiang manages the hard path of going to school, but Wawa is too young. However, he is desperate to learn and secretly makes the dangerous journey so he can listen to his sister Naxiang's lessons in school.

== Cast ==
- Ding Jiali as Wawa
- Anamuling as Naxiang
- Cao Xiwen as Miss Nie
- Chen Yifei

== Reception ==
A critic from Variety wrote that "A simple story, well told, of a rural tragedy that leads to the building of a bridge, “Walking to School” is a solid feature debut by brothers Peng Chen and Peng Jiahuang". A critic from The Hollywood Reporter wrote that "Being a “main rhythm” film puts the “Walk” into a catch 22 situation. On the one hand, it tries to rally audience concern by highlighting the protagonists’ miserable plight. On the other hand, it stops short of exposing any fallacies in the system, and instead drowns their problems in a jingoistic ending glorifying public roadwork".
