= Welcome to Pyongyang Animal Park =

2001 film

- Title screen for the film with a peacock.
- Hangul: 어서 오세요
- RR: Eoseo oseyo
- MR: Ŏsŏ oseyo
- Directed by: Yun Chan (윤찬)
- Release date: 2001
- Running time: 120 minutes
- Country: North Korea
- Language: Korean

Welcome to Pyongyang Animal Park (Korean: 어서 오세요) is a 2001 North Korean film directed by Yun Chan. Originally made as a two 60 minute episode television series, the film is a coming of age drama about a young woman, Un A (은아), who achieves her goals in spite of interference from her family.

Welcome to Pyongyang Animal Park was one of three North Korean films shown at the Special Screening section of the 6th Jeonju International Film Festival, held in South Korea from 28 April–6 May 2005.
