= Until the Azalea Blooms =

1998 South Korean television series

- Also known as: Red Azalea
- Hangul: 진달래꽃 필 때까지
- RR: Jindallaekkot pil ttaekkaji
- MR: Chindallaekkot p'il ttaekkaji
- Based on: Until the Rhododendron Blooms by Shin Young-hee
- Written by: Yoon Hyuk-min; Park Young-sook; Jung Sung-san
- Directed by: Yum Hyun-sub; Lee Won-ik; Hong Sung-duk; Kim Yoo-chul
- Starring: Yum Jung-ah; Yoo Tae-woong; Yoon Dong-hwan; Park Geun-hyung; Jung Dong-hwan; Heo Jin
- Country of origin: South Korea
- Original language: Korean
- No. of episodes: 8

Production
- Executive producer: Eom Hyun-sup
- Producer: Lee Won-ik
- Running time: 70 minutes

Original release
- Network: KBS2
- Release: January 5 – January 27, 1998

Until the Azalea Blooms (Korean: 진달래꽃 필 때까지) is a South Korean miniseries starring Yum Jung-ah and Yoo Tae-woong. It aired on KBS2 from January 5 to January 27, 1998.

Based on the 1996 essay by Mansudae ballerina Shin Young-hee Until the Rhododendron Blooms, which portrays North Korean society during Kim Il Sung's regime, the show dramatizes her life in the north of the peninsula, the public execution of Woo In-hee, a mistress of North Korean leader Kim Jong Il, which she personally witnessed, and her defection to South Korea. One of its three writers, Jung Sung-san, was also a defector from North Korea, and the series was his first work in South Korea.

The first two episodes achieved a viewership rating of 16–21%, but the series was criticized for being overly sensational, ridiculing North Korea and distorting the original work. The author herself, in early October 1997, tried to stop the show from airing, filing an injunction against KBS for copyright infringement and asking for a halt of the production of the drama. On January 5, 1998, the same day the series began airing, the Seoul Central District Court rejected the injunction, saying "There is no reason".

Until the Azalea Blooms, remembered nowadays as one of the first entertainment programs that portrays North Korea without propaganda purposes, was negatively received by North Korea, which threatened to kill the staff and bomb KBS headquarters if the channel aired it, as the drama deals with corruption in the North. Listeners in North Korea, however, sent letters to encourage the producers to expose "the atrocities of dictators". North Korea banned it as well, but it has nevertheless circulated and people have been punished and executed for watching it. The series was extremely sensitive in North Korea, as it revealed the very existence of Kippumjo (pleasure group).

== Cast ==
- Yum Jung-ah as Joo Myung-hee (Shin Young-hee)
- Yoo Tae-woong as Kang Ryong-nam
- Yoon Dong-hwan as Han Ji-wook
- Jung Dong-hwan as Kim Jong Il
- Heo Jin as Kim Kyong-hui
- Park Geun-hyung as Lee Chul-kyu
- Park Woong
- Park Won-sook
- Jeong Wook as Hwang Jang-yop
- Jeon Moo-song
- Baek Yoon-sik
- Kim Chung as Rim Hye-ok
- Lee Chi-woo as O Jin-u
- Na O-mi as Woo In-hee
- Han Young-sook as Choi Eun-hee
- Heo Yoon-jung
- No Hyun-hee as Geum-shil
- Hong Seung-hee
- Kim Ji-yeon as Kim Seung-hee
- Choi Yeo-reum as Hee-sook
- Park Geon-shik
- Kim Il-woo
- Kim Ji-won
- Jo Seung-hee as Rim Sook-hee
