= The Blast Furnace =

- 용광로
- Directed by: Min Chongshik (민정식)
- Screenplay by: Kim Yonggun (김영근)
- Produced by: Division of Film Productions of the Workers' Party of Korea (국립영화촬영소)
- Release date: 1950 (North Korea)
- Country: North Korea
- Language: Korean

The Blast Furnace is a 1950 North Korean film directed by Min Chongshik. The script was written by Kim Yonggun. It was produced by the Division of Film Productions of the Korean Workers' Party.

The film was released during the Korean War.

== Plot ==
Ryongsu, a worker at the blasting furnace, suggests a way to develop fire bricks with their own technology without relying on import, but the technicians at the plant ignore Ryongsu's suggestions. Ryongsu and his assistant Hyeyoung work day and night researching fire bricks. This upsets Ryongsu's Ryongyeon who is jealous of their relationship. Ryongsu sends a letter to Ryongyeon to clear the air, but the misunderstanding remains, due to her inability to read. Ryongyeon studies Hangul. Ryongsu's research is endangered by spies, and Ryongyeon appears and saves the day.

== Reception ==
The film was the second feature film to be made and released in North Korean cinema. Many famous stars of Korean film, including Moon Ye-bong, were in the film.

== See also ==
- Cinema of North Korea
- List of North Korean films
