= Ri Chun-gu =

North Korean screenwriter (1942–2023)

- 리춘구
- Born: April 12, 1942; Pyongyang, Korea, Empire of Japan
- Died: June 2023 (aged 81)
- Education: Kim Il Sung University
- Occupation: Screenwriter
- Years active: 1967–c. 2000

Ri Chun-gu (Korean: 리춘구; April 12, 1942 – c. June 2023) was a North Korean screenwriter who was allegedly imprisoned in 2008. One of the most famous and acclaimed screenwriters in North Korea, he was awarded the Order of Kim Il Sung, Kim Il Sung Prize, and earned the title of Hero of Labour twice.

== Early life and career ==
Ri was born on April 12, 1942, in Pyongyang, at the time occupied by Japan and currently a part of North Korea. After leaving Pyongchon High School, he enrolled at Kim Il Sung University in 1963 and remained there for several years. According to Radio Free Asia, Ri first met Kim Jong Il in 1967; Kim was impressed by Ri's comments on how new screenwriters are treated and requested he start submitting scripts to him immediately. Ri debuted with The Heat Management Ball.

He later became one of the most influential writers in North Korean cinema, scripting films such as The Fourteenth Winter (1980), Youthful Heart (1981), Secretary in Charge of the County Party (1982), Pulgasari (1985; albeit uncredited), A Broad Bellflower (1987), Man Remaining in Our Heart (1989), and Traces of Life (1989). He also wrote an important part of the Nation and Destiny (1992–2002) film series.

== Alleged imprisonment ==
A 2012 report from Radio Free Asia said that Ri had been "stripped of all his honorary positions and dismissed as a farm worker in [R]yanggang Province. His crime is that he dared to speak against Kim Jong-il’s wishes." In 2013, North Korean defectors included Ri on a list alleged to consist of writers in captivity in North Korea. The defectors claimed that he had been imprisoned under Kim Jong Il's orders in 2008 for infuriating Kim when they were discussing revision on a script.

In 2012, a defector told Johannes Schönherr in an interview that Ri had been sent to Ryanggang Province for hard labour following the 1989 release of Man Remaining in Our Heart, saying the film's premise "was considered too impure". The defector also says that this was the end of Ri's writing career, even though Ri went on to write about 60 films after 1989.

== Death ==
His death was reported on June 15, 2023; a day after his funeral. The Korean Central News Agency stated: "Kim Jong Un sent a wreath to express his deep condolences on the death of comrade Ri Chun-gu, a writer of the Paekdu Mountain Creative Troupe who was a recipient of the Order of Kim Il-sung, the recipient of the Kim Il-sung Prize, and a double hero of labour."

== Filmography ==
- The Heat Management Ball - debut
- To the End of This Earth (1977)
- The Fourteenth Winter (1980)
- Youthful Heart (1981)
- Secretary in Charge of the County Party (1982)
- Please Wait for Me (1982)
- Pulgasari (1985) [with Kim Se Ryun; uncredited]
- Snow Melts in Spring (1985)
- The Girls of Jangsan-ri (1985)
- Revolutionary (1985)
- The Birth of a New Government (1986)
- A Broad Bellflower (1987)
- Guarantee (1987)
- The Sun of the Nation (1987-1991) [with Paek In Jun]
- Ask Yourself (1988)
- Man Remaining in Our Heart (1989)
- Traces of Life (1989)
- A Life Full of Ups and Downs (1989-1990)
- You, In My Heart (1990)
- The Girls in My Hometown (1991)
- The Symphonic Poem for Seniors (1991)
- The Filial Daughter (1991)
- Nation and Destiny Parts 1-4: Choe Hyon Dok (1992) [with Choe Sang Gun, Sin Sang Ho, Pak Chong Ryong, Kim Yong Jun, and Hyon Sang Mu]
- Nation and Destiny Parts 5-8: Yun Sang Min (1992) [with Choe Sang Gun, Sin Sang Ho, Ri Hui Chan, O Jin Hung, and Ri Dok Yun]
- Nation and Destiny Parts 9-10: Cha Hong Gi (1992) [with Choe Sang Gun, Sin Sang Ho, Jang Rye Sun, and Kim Se Ryun]
- Nation and Destiny Parts 11-13: Hong Yong Ja (1992) [with Choe Sang Gun, Sin Sang Ho, Jang Rye Sun, and Kim Se Ryun]
- Nation and Destiny Parts 14-16: Ri Jong Mo (1993) [with Choe Sang Gun, Sin Sang Ho, Ri Hui Chan, and Ri Dok Yun]
- Nation and Destiny Parts 17-19: Ho Jong Sun (1994) [with O Jin Hung, Hyon Sang Mu, and Ryu Bu Yon]
- Nation and Destiny Parts 20-25: Naturalized Japanese Women (1995) [with O Jin Hung, Ryu Bu Yon, and O Hyon Rak)
- Nation and Destiny Parts 26-36: Workers (1995-1998) [with Ri Dok Yun, Hong Sun Bok, and Pak Chol Ryong]
- The Secretary in Charge of Taehongdan County (1997-2001) [with Ri Dok Yun, and O Hyon Rak]
- A Forest is Swaying (1997) [with O Jin Hung]
- The Bloodstained Mark (1998)
- Nation and Destiny Parts 46-51: Choe Hyon (1999-2000) [with Ri Dok Yun, and O Hyon Rak]
- Nation and Destiny Parts 52-56: People of the Past, Present and Future (2000-2001) [with O Jin Hung, and Pak Jong Ju]
