= Our Fragrance =

- DVD cover
- Hangul: 우리의 향기
- Hanja: 우리의 香氣
- RR: Uriui hyanggi
- MR: Uriŭi hyanggi
- Directed by: Jon Jong Pal
- Written by: Ri Suk Gyong
- Starring: Jong Un Mo, Kim Un Yong, Ri Yun Su, Kim Yong Suk, Kim Son Ok, Ri Kwang Son
- Release date: 2003
- Country: North Korea
- Language: Korean

Our Fragrance (Urie Hyanggi) is a 2003 North Korean film written by Ri Suk Gyong and produced and directed by Jon Jong Pal. It falls under the genre of comedy and reflects the period following the 2002 market-oriented economic reforms. Although an initial match-making attempt between Pyongho and Saebyol through their grandparents is unsuccessful, the two are brought together by fate to participate in the Pyongyang spring fashion show. Modelling both the fashion and the virtues of a wedding couple, their families convene to judge their potential union. However, tradition versus the foreign influence seeping into society becomes the theme as misunderstandings come to create drama between the two families and the young couple.
