= Na O-mi =

South Korean actress (born 1951)

- Born: Jeong Yeong-il; 29 May 1951 (age 74); Mokpo, South Korea
- Occupation: Actress
- Years active: 1971–1973, 1992–1998
- Spouse: Unknown (m. 1974; died 1989) (Note: The husband's name varies between sources: the initial report of her marriage made by the JoongAng Ilbo writes that her husband's name was Choi Jiyoung, a Dong-A Ilbo article written in 1990 says that his name was Choi Myeong-hwan, and an article in the magazine TV Times states that he was named Choi Myeong-gwang.)
- Children: 3

Korean name
- Hangul: 정영일
- RR: Jeong Yeongil
- MR: Chŏng Yŏngil

Stage name
- Hangul: 나오미
- RR: Na Omi
- MR: Na Omi

Na O-mi (Korean: 나오미; born 29 May 1951), born Jeong Yeong-il (정영일), is a South Korean actress. In her three years active as a film actress, she starred in more than 10 films, debuting in Lovers' Classroom, directed by Shin Seong-il.

== Biography ==
Na O-mi was born Jeong Yeong-il on 29 May 1951, in Mokpo, South Korea. She attended primary and middle school in the city but moved to Seoul in high school. Her stage name, Na O-mi, was inspired by the song I Dream of Naomi performed by Hedva and David.

Na's career started when she came second place in the Miss Young International beauty pageant. Shin Seong-il, who was one of the pageant's judges, directed her debut film Lovers' Classroom, which made her into a star. Her planned second film role was in A Love Story alongside Sin Yeong-il, who had also served as her partner in Lovers' Classroom; however, the burden of being the lead actress made Na quit a day into filming. Afterwards, she starred in Spring, Summer, Fall, and Winter, another Shin Seong-il film—her role earned her Best New Actress at the Baeksang Arts Awards.

In October 1973, Na moved to the United States. At first, it was said that her stay was to visit her older sister, who lived in Washington, DC. She married a businessman in March of the following year, with whom she had three children. After the death of her husband in 1989, Na inherited his business, but she returned to South Korea following the 1992 Los Angeles riots. She came back to the entertainment industry the same year, starring in the morning drama Autumn Woman as a makeup artist.

As of 2020, she is operating a tea house in Los Angeles. In 2024, she was appointed to be a judge at the 2024 World Grand Prix Model Competition Korea Final.

== Filmography ==
Note: the whole list is referenced.

=== Film ===
Year	Title	Role
1971	Lovers' Classroom	Hyeon-seon
1971	Spring, Summer, Fall, and Winter	Hyeon-a
1972	Friendship	Ji-ae
1972	Sun, Moon, Star and Love	Eun-ha
1972	A Man Between Walls	Ju-hui
1972	An Unmarried Teacher	Han In-suk
1972	The Midnight Sun	Hye-ryeong
1972	My Beloved Sons and Daughters	Go Eun-suk
1972	Gate of Woman	Lady
1972	A Tiger of In Wang Mountain	Ae-ra
1973	Mother's Glory	Jin-suk
1973	Wrath of an Angel	Teacher Kim
1973	Homecoming	Setsuko
1973	A Lodger's Life	
1973	25 O'Clock of Youth	Jeong-uk
1973	Disembowelment	Akiko
1973	Private Kim and Yi Ppeun Yi	Yi Ppeun-yi
1973	A Field Full of Happiness	Gyeong-suk
1973	College Days	Yeong-ja
1973	A Family with Many Daughters	Mia
1973	Love and Hatred	Dal
1973	During Mother's Lifetime	Hye-mi

=== Television series ===
Year	Title	Ref.
1992	Autumn Woman	
1994	Magpie	
1998	Until the Azalea Blooms	
