= Woo In-hee =

Actress, mistress of Kim Jong Il (c. 1940–1981)

- Woo as Chunhyang in The Tale of Chunhyang (1959)
- Born: c. 1940; Kaesong, Korea, Empire of Japan
- Died: 1981 (aged c. 41); Kang Kon Military Academy, Pyongyang, North Korea
- Cause of death: Execution by firing squad
- Occupation: Actress
- Known for: Mistress of Kim Jong Il
- Notable work: The Tale of Chunhyang, The Story of a Detachment Commander, The Town where We Live, The Girl from Diamond Mountain
- Title: People's Actress
- Spouse: Yoo Ho-sun
- Partner: Kim Jong Il
- Children: Three

Korean name
- Hangul: 우인희
- Hanja: 禹仁姫
- RR: U Inhui
- MR: U Inhŭi

Woo In-hee (Korean: 우인희; c. 1940–1981) was a North Korean actress and a mistress of Kim Jong Il.

Having reached stardom in the 1960s and 1970s, Woo, renowned for her beauty, acted in dozens of films. She married Yoo Ho-sun, a famed film director, but she was involved in affairs outside of her marriage. In the late 1970s, she became a secret mistress of Kim Jong Il. After Woo began an affair with another man, Kim had her publicly executed in front of 6,000 people.

== Early life ==
Woo In-hee was born in Kaesong. Though her exact date of birth remains unknown, it is believed to be in the late 1930s or early 1940s. She worked during the Korean War. Already a dancer, she was later taken to Pyongyang to become an actress and was dubbed the most beautiful woman in North Korea ever since.

== Career ==
After just one year in Pyongyang, Woo In-hee was given the main part in The Tale of Chunhyang, (Note: South Korean scholar Lee Hyang-jin does not mention the film and traces the earliest North Korean film of the traditional folk tale in 1980, but the film could well be a lost film that is only available for domestic viewing. This was the first major appearance in Woo's career that peaked in the 1960s and 1970s.) earning her instant stardom. She would go on to act in dozens of successful films. In The Girl from Diamond Mountain, for instance, Woo acted the role of a woman spanning her whole life from her youth to advanced age. Woo earned dozens of awards and had the prestigious title of People's Actress conferred upon her. Her feats attracted the personal interest and attention of Kim Jong Il. As a gesture of confidence, she was given an extraordinary permission to travel abroad to Czechoslovakia and study acting there. Woo's career flourished during the 1960s and 1970s.

== Personal life ==
=== Marriage to Yoo Ho-sun ===
Upon returning from Czechoslovakia, Woo In-hee married Yoo Ho-sun, one of North Korea's most gifted directors. The couple had three sons. Woo, however, started affairs with various other men in the 1970s, which ruined her reputation. Her first extramarital relationship was with a member of her camera crew. Others were also involved in the film industry. By the end of the 1970s, rumors had spread to the point that her colleagues confronted her directly. They accused her of adultery during a mutual criticism session, but Woo reacted with defiance, pointing out that her accusers were in fact men who had begun affairs with her and thus adulterers themselves. Her career was ruined as she was stripped of her title of People's Actress and instead of acting was made to tend to the boiler of the film studio for a year, a dangerous job with 12-hour shifts. In 1979, however, she was suddenly allowed to return to acting, and was even given some lead roles.

=== Affair with Kim Jong Il ===
Woo started an affair with Kim Jong Il. It is not known for certain when they began their courtship, other than it took place sometime in the late 1970s. At the time, Unsung Heroes was being filmed and her husband Yoo Ho-sun acted in the film. It is possible that Kim and Woo had courted for years before Woo's fall from grace, or that her ruin made it possible for Kim to initiate a relationship in exchange for allowing her to return to acting. Kim had a fellow actor follow her around and report on her activities. The relationship was top secret and was being kept from everyone including Yoo.

After Kim, Woo fell in love with a young Zainichi Korean who had come to North Korea to work at a radio station. Woo met him and he overcame her initial reluctance. The couple could not meet in public, so they met driving around for hours in the man's Mercedes. In the winter of 1980, after such a joyride, they were found in the car suffering from carbon monoxide poisoning caused by the engine left running with windows shut to keep the cold out. The man had died and Woo had to spend two weeks at a hospital recovering. While interrogated over the death, she mentioned Kim Jong Il.

== Execution ==
Kim Jong Il had Woo executed for talking about her secret relationship with the Zainichi man. In 1981, Woo was told she was free to go, but was instead taken to the Kang Kon Military Academy shooting grounds just north of Pyongyang. She was tied to a post and shot in front of 6,000 people. Twelve gunmen each fired 10 rounds from their AK-47s, mutilating her body beyond recognition. Woo's husband was forced to watch the execution. Kim nullified Woo and Yoo's marriage and forced the latter to finish Unsung Heroes.

Woo's name and image were purged from magazines and film catalogs. She was edited out of films she had performed in, rendering their plots incomprehensible. Although the 6,000 witnesses to her execution were told not to talk about what they had seen, the incident is widely known in North Korea. A South Korean TV drama, Until the Azalea Blooms, portrays her life. The show was banned in North Korea, but has nevertheless circulated in the country and people have been punished for watching it.

== Filmography ==
- The Story of a Detachment Commander (1966) (한 지대장의 이야기)
- The Town where We Live (우리가 사는 고장)
- The Girl from Diamond Mountain (1968) (금강산처녀)

== Other works ==
- The Tale of Chunhyang (1959) (춘향전)

== See also ==
- Cinema of North Korea
- List of North Korean actors
- Song Hye-rim – Actress, mistress of Kim Jong Il (1939–2002)
