= Souls Protest =

- DVD cover
- Hangul: 살아있는 령혼들 (Note: The South Korean spelling Korean: 살아있는 영혼들 is more common online. See dueum beopchik for details on this orthographical difference.)
- Hanja: 살아있는 靈魂들
- RR: Sarainneun ryeonghondeul
- MR: Sarainnŭn ryŏnghondŭl
- Directed by: Merited Artiste Kim Chun Song
- Written by: Ko Won Kil; Kim Yong Sik
- Starring: Merited Actor Kim Chol; Kim Ryon Hwa; Merited Actor Ri Yong Ho
- Cinematography: Merited Artiste Han So Yong
- Edited by: Jong Yong Sim
- Music by: People's Artiste So Jong Kon
- Production company: Korean Film Studio
- Distributed by: Mokran Video; Korean Film Export & Import Corporation
- Release date: 2000
- Running time: 100 minutes
- Country: North Korea
- Language: Korean

Souls Protest (Korean: 살아있는 령혼들; lit. 'Living Souls') is a 2000 North Korean film directed by Kim Chun-song.

The film is an epic dramatisation of a mysterious explosion sinking the Ukishima Maru, while it was on a trip to repatriate Koreans in the wake of World War II. The explosion ship sank 10 days after Japan surrendered to the United States on 15 August 1945. The film supports the Korean view that the explosion was deliberately set off by the ship's Japanese crew. It has been dubbed as "Korea's Titanic".

Souls Protest was imported to South Korea by Narai Film, a Seoul-based film trader, and was approved for release after five minutes of footage was cut which showed jubilant Koreans crediting Kim Il Sung with liberating Korea from Japanese colonial rule. The film was shown intact, however, for its Seoul premiere on 24 August 2001, the 56th anniversary of the incident. One survivor of the incident, Lee Chul-woo, said of the film: "I didn't like the propaganda stuff about Kim Il Sung... But the scene about the explosion was so real, and it is laudable for North Korea to make a movie about this incident."

Souls Protest was later screened at the 2003 Jeonju International Film Festival.
