= Paek Sol-mi =

North Korean actress (fl. 21st century)

Paek Sol-mi; 백설미
- Born: North Korea
- Occupation: Actress

Paek Sol-mi (Korean: 백설미) is a North Korean actress. She was named Best Actress at the 2016 Pyongyang International Film Festival for her performance in the North Korean drama film The Story of Our Home.

== Career ==
Paek studied acting in Pyongyang. At age 24, she made her screen debut as Ri Jong-A in The Story of Our Home, for which she was awarded Best Actress at the 2016 Pyongyang International Film Festival. Due to the success of the film, Paek was briefly introduced to international audiences as the film screened in South Korea and was presented at the Moscow International Film Festival.

== Filmography ==
Year	Title	Role
2016	The Story of Our Home	Ri Jong-A
