= A Hedgehog Defeats a Tiger =

1984 film by Shin Sang-ok

A Hedgehog Defeats a Tiger (Korean: 호랑이를 이긴 고슴도치) is a 1984 children's animated film released exclusively in North Korea. It was directed by Shin Sang-ok during his abduction in North Korea. The movie's screenwriting was made by Kim Jong Il, who allegedly was inspired by a fable he told in his early school life.

The film follows a hedgehog, who challenges an arrogant tiger that confronts and attempts to bully a group of forest animal friends into submission.
