= So Kyong-sop =

North Korean actor (born 1939)

People's Artiste of the DPRK So Kyong-sop
- 서경섭
- So Kyong-sop (center) at the opening of the Arirang Mass Games in October 2005.
- Born: 31 March 1939 (age 87); Ryongchon County, North Pyongan Province, Korea, Empire of Japan
- Occupation: Actor

Korean name
- Hangul: 서경섭
- RR: Seo Gyeongseop
- MR: Sŏ Kyŏngsŏp

So Kyong-sop (Korean: 서경섭; born 31 March 1939) is a North Korean actor. A holder of the title People's Artiste, he starred in over 80 films in his career. Along with Kim Ryong-lin and Choe Chang Su, he is considered one of the three greatest North Korean actors.

== Biography ==
So was born on 31 March 1939, in Ryongchon County, North Pyongan Province, Korea, Empire of Japan. In 1958, he started acting for the Korean Art Film Studio. At the start of his acting career, he simultaneously attended the Pyongyang University of Theatre and Film from 1963 to 1970. He portrayed major characters in many films starting in the 1960s, having appeared in lead roles in over 80 feature films by the 2000s.

Among So's notable lead roles were in the films Affection (애착, 1964), Rolling Mill Workers (압연 공 들, 1972), The Forest Sways (숲은 설레인다, 1982), A Silver Hairpin (은비녀, 1985), and Guarantee (보증, 1989). He was widely known in North Korea for his portrayal of Hong Sik, an intelligence scout, in the series Unsung Heroes (1979–1980). He was also praised for his role of Yun Sang Min (based on real-life composer Isang Yun) in the series Nation and Destiny, where, according to the Joseon Local History Encyclopedia, "he brought the character ... to life with a unique performance, fully demonstrating his talent as a renowned actor". Other film appearances by So included In the Village on the Demarcation Line (분계 마을 에서, 1961), Red Simcheong (붉은 심청, 1961), Sanul Forest (산울 선 림, 1962), The Aggressor Ship General Sherman (침략 선 셔먼호, 1964), Endless Is My Hope (끝 없어 라 나의 희망, 1964), Youth Vanguard (청년 전위, 1965), New Star (새별, 1966), First Mission (첫 임무, 1969), Nothing to Envy in the World (세상에 부럼 없어 라, 1970), The Story of Tractor No. 1 (뜨락또르 1. 호 에 깃든 이야기, 1971), County Party Committee Secretary (군당 책임 비서, 1983), Snow Melts in Spring (봄날 의 눈석, 1985), Ask Yourself (자신 에게 물어 보라, 1988), and My Father (나의 아버지, 1996).

So was known for "sincerity and authentic performances in his roles", and for being a "model for portraying positive characters" with "flawless performances in lead roles across numerous films and dramas". He was given the title of People's Artiste in 1983 and awarded many honors including the Order of the National Flag first class. Along with Kim Ryong-lin and Choe Chang-su, he is considered one of the three greatest North Korean actors.

So has worked part-time with the faculty at the Pyongyang University of Theatre and Film. He is married to an actress, and their daughter is also in the profession.
