= Moon Ye-bong =

North Korean actress (1917–1999)

- 문예봉/文藝峰
- Moon in 1941
- Born: January 3, 1917; Hamhung, Korea, Empire of Japan
- Died: March 26, 1999 (aged 82); North Korea
- Occupation: Actress

Moon Ye-bong (Korean: 문예봉; Hanja: 文藝峰; January 3, 1917 – March 26, 1999) was a North Korean actress.

== Biography ==
Her career began on the stage as an early teen, and by the early 1930s, she appeared in her first film: A Ferry Boat That Has No Owner (1932).^{:352} Moon Ye-Bong was widely seen as representative of the "New Woman," or of modern Korean women. By the 1930s and 1940s, she was one of the most popular actresses in Korea.

She starred in many pro-Japanese films during the Japanese occupation of Korea. In 1941, she starred in the Korean-made, Korean-language film Angels without a Home, which was about Korean street children; despite the fact that the Japanese occupiers had outlawed as a language of instruction except in primary schools, was supported by the Japanese Ministry of Education and shown widely in Japan.

She migrated to North Korea in 1948.^{:349} Moon Ye-Bong was in the second film ever made in North Korea, The Blast Furnace. She starred in the 1954 film A Partisan Maiden as a communist guerilla fighting the Americans during the Korean War.^{:350}

While she received awards from the North Korean government during the 1950s, she fell victim to the political purges of 1969; in 1980, she was rehabilitated and named a "people's actress."^{:352}

== Selected filmography ==
- A Ferry Boat That Has No Owner (Imja eomneun narutbae, 1932)
- Wanderer (Nageune, 1937)
- Military Train (Gunyong yeolcha, 1938)
- Tuition (Sueomnyo, 1940)
- Volunteer (Jiwonbyeong, 1941)
- Angels without a Home (1941)
- Straits of Chosun (Joseon haehyeop, 1943)
- My Home Village (Nae gohyang, 1949)
- The Blast Furnace (Yonggwangno, 1950)
- A Boy Partisan (Sonyeon ppalchisan, 1951)
- A Partisan Maiden [A Partisan Woman] (Ppalchisan cheonyeo, 1954)
- A Newly-Wed (Sinhon bubu, 1955)
