= The Story of Our Home =

2016 film by Ri Yun-Ho

- Hangul: 우리집 이야기
- RR: Urijip iyagi
- MR: Urijip iyagi
- Directed by: Ri Yun-Ho
- Screenplay by: Jang Sun-Yong; Won Yong-Sil
- Based on: The life of Jang Jong Hwa
- Starring: Paek Sol-mi; Kim Thae-Gum; Kim Pom-Gyong; O Hyon-Choi
- Production company: Korean Film Studio
- Release date: September 20, 2016
- Running time: 100 minutes
- Country: North Korea
- Language: Korean

The Story of Our Home (Korean: 우리집 이야기) is a 2016 North Korean drama film based on the life of Jang Jong Hwa, the "child mother" who adopted several orphans at a young age. Directed by Ri Yun-Ho, the film won the top prize at the 2016 Pyongyang Film Festival.

In 2018, The Story of Our Home became the first North Korean film to be screened publicly in South Korea when it was presented at the Bucheon International Fantastic Film Festival.

== Premise ==
Eighteen-year-old Ri Jong-A cares for a family of orphaned children. The eldest of the siblings, Un-Jong, is unreceptive to the help.

== Cast ==
- Paek Sol-mi as Ri Jong-A, the eighteen-year-old caretaker of several orphaned children
- Kim Thae-Gum as Un-Jong, the eldest of the children cared for by Jong-A
- Kim Pom-Gyong and O Hyon-Choi as Un-Hyang and Un-Chol, Un-Jong's siblings

== Release ==
The Story of Our Home premiered at the 2016 Pyongyang International Film Festival, where it was recognized with the top film prize, the Torch Award. Paek Sol-mi was awarded Best Actress for her performance as Ri Jong-A, her on-screen debut.

Unlike many North Korean films, The Story of Our Home was screened at film festivals outside the country, most notably at the Bucheon International Fantastic Film Festival in South Korea.

== Accolades ==
| Award | Date of ceremony | Category | Recipient(s) | Result | Ref. |
|---|---|---|---|---|---|
| Pyongyang International Film Festival | September 23, 2016 | Torch Award | The Story of Our Home | Won | |
| Pyongyang International Film Festival | September 23, 2016 | Best Actress | Paek Sol-mi | Won | |
