= Myself in the Distant Future =

- Hangul: 먼 후날의 나의 모습
- Hanja: 먼 後날의 나의 모습
- RR: Meon hunarui naui moseup
- MR: Mŏn hunarŭi naŭi mosŭp
- Directed by: Jang In-hak
- Written by: Yui Ung-jong
- Starring: Kim Hye-gyong; Kim Myong-mun
- Cinematography: Kang Sung-chan
- Release date: 1997
- Running time: 107 minutes
- Country: North Korea
- Language: Korean

Myself in the Distant Future (Korean: 먼 후날의 나의 모습) is a 1997 North Korean film directed by Jang In-hak.

== Summary ==
A young man falls in love with the leader of a shock brigade of plasterers who are working to modernize their home village. He attempts to win her heart and take her back to Pyongyang by becoming a model worker, but she chooses to continue her plastering.

The film's central theme is that a person should be happy and content in the place of their birth, regardless of conditions, and supports the willingness of the North Korean government to restrict migration from the countryside into the cities. Another theme is for people to "eat potatoes, not rice", which reinforces an official government campaign encouraging the consumption of potatoes. Despite being filmed during the 1994–1998 North Korean famine, Myself in the Distant Future depicts a country blessed with a plentiful supply of food.

== Festival screenings ==
Myself in the Distant Future was screened at the 6th Pyongyang International Film Festival in 1998, where it was awarded both the Golden Torch and Acting prizes. In 2000, it was one of eight North Korean films played at the Udine Festival of Far East Film, where it was regarded by Richard James Havis of Asiaweek as being "one of the more obvious propaganda movies".
