= The Respected Comrade Supreme Commander Is Our Destiny =

The Respected Comrade Supreme Commander is Our Destiny
- Hangul: 경애하는 최고사령관동지는 우리의 운명
- Hanja: 敬愛하는 最高司令官同志는 우리의 運命
- RR: Gyeongaehaneun choego saryeonggwan dongjineun uriui unmyeong
- MR: Kyŏngaehanŭn ch'oego saryŏnggwan tongjinŭn uriŭi unmyŏng
- Release date: 2008
- Country: North Korea
- Language: Korean

The Respected Comrade Supreme Commander Is Our Destiny (Korean: 경애하는 최고사령관동지는 우리의 운명) is a 2008 North Korean film, described by the North Korean State news agency KCNA as a documentary film.

It was screened at the People's Palace of Culture in Pyongyang in August 2008 for the 48th anniversary of Kim Jong Il's first steps in his Songun revolution leadership, and aimed at celebrating him as the author of the policy. Selected spectators included Party, army and state officials, as well as "officials of working people's organizations" and of "national institutions".

KCNA published the following review:

The film impressively deals with the immortal feats Kim Jong Il performed by developing the Korean People's Army into invincible revolutionary armed forces and leading the confrontation with the imperialists and the U.S. to victory in the 90s of the last century under the uplifted banner of Songun and thereby demonstrating the might of Juche Korea.
