= Oh, Youth! =

- DVD cover
- Directed by: Jon Jong Pal
- Written by: Ri Il Chol
- Starring: Merited Actress Kim Yong Suk; Merited Actor Jang Yu Song; Hwang Song Ok
- Cinematography: Ryu Sung Chol
- Edited by: Ju Suk Kyong
- Music by: Merited Artiste Han Si Jun
- Production company: Korean Film Studio
- Distributed by: Korea Film Export and Import Corporation; Mokran Video
- Release date: 1995 (North Korea)
- Running time: 92 minutes
- Country: North Korea
- Language: Korean

Oh, Youth!, also called O Youth!, is a 1995 North Korean comedy drama film directed by Jon Jong Pal and written by Ri Il Chol, which was originally titled "Chongchuniyo!". While North Korea is not typically known for releasing comedies, Oh Youth! is a rare example of a comedic film produced in the DPRK, with English subtitles, and can be viewed on YouTube. Of note is that, while mention of the late North Korean leader Kim Jong Il is a typical occurrence, the success of the characters is not attributed to him.

The film focuses on the life of a Korean family, and a romance between two characters with an interest in tae kwon do, an ancient martial art with its origins in Korea.

Oh Youth! contains scenes from Pyongyang. Locations shown in the film include the Grand People's Study House, a Pyongyang amusement park, and the Pothong River.
