= Pyongyang International Film Festival =

North Korean film festival

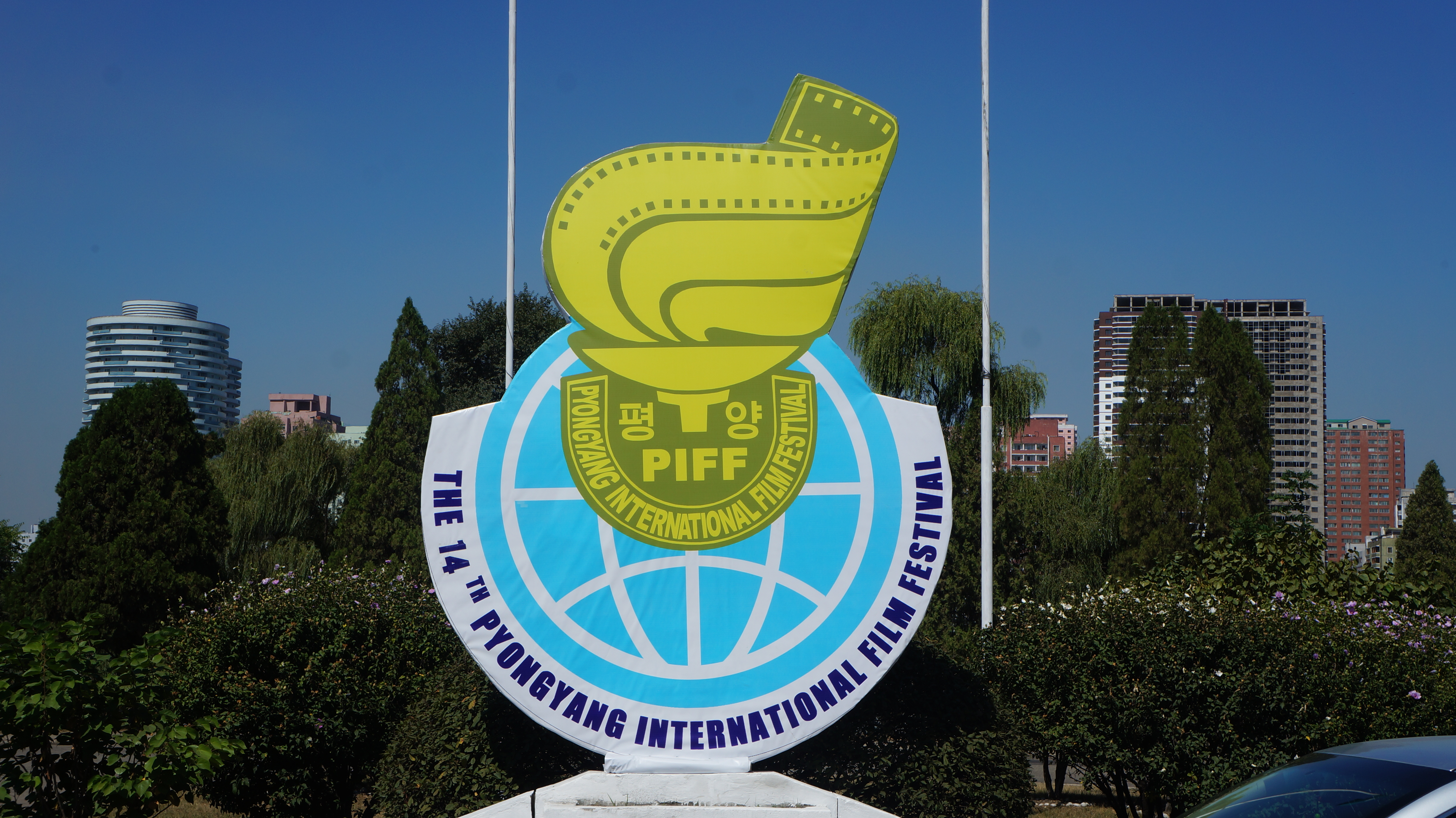

Korean name
- Hangul: 평양 국제 영화 축전
- Hanja: 平壤國際映畵祝典
- RR: Pyeongyang gukje yeonghwa chukjeon
- MR: P'yŏngyang kukche yŏnghwa ch'ukchŏn

The Pyongyang International Film Festival (Korean: 평양 국제 영화 축전) is a biennial cultural exhibition held in Pyongyang, North Korea. Until 2002, the film festival was reserved to "non-aligned and other developing countries".

== History ==
The event originated in 1987 as the Pyongyang Film Festival of the Non-aligned and Other Developing Countries (쁠럭불가담 및 기타 발전도상나라들의 평양 영화 축전). The maiden event, held from September 1 through September 10, showed short films, features, and documentaries that were judged for competitive awards.

The film festival returned in 1990 and would be regularly held every other year. Recurrent subject matter included domestic cinema that commonly praised the high leadership such as a film shown at the 1992 film festival, verbosely translated, Glory of Our People in Holding the Great Leader in High Esteem, and foreign films about revolutionary resistance.

In 2000, officials widened the acceptable breadth of film watching by screening Japanese films for the first time when Yoji Yamada arrived to present six of his films. 2002 saw further relaxation of rules and since then the festival has been open to more than just "non-aligned and other developing countries".

The ninth festival, held in 2004, moderated cultural restrictions further with the screening of a dubbed and censored version of the British comedy Bend It Like Beckham and U.S.-produced South African drama Cry, The Beloved Country. Bend it like Beckham won the music prize and later it became the first Western-made film shown on television in North Korea.

In 2006, the Swedish horror comedy Frostbite was shown at the festival, the first foreign horror film to ever be shown in North Korea. The Schoolgirl's Diary, which was released the same year, became the first North Korean film in several decades to be picked up for international distribution, when it was purchased by French company Pretty Pictures. It was released in France in late 2007.

== Organization ==
The festival was held in the autumn every two years until 2018; after that, the festival has become yearly, with the 17th edition organized in September 2019. It has an international jury and both competitive and non-competitive submissions. In that sense, it is "structured ... very much like any other international film festival".

Since 2000, the festival has been dominated by films from Western Europe. Many of the films are censored and often have themes emphasising family values, loyalty and the temptations of money. In 2008, 110 films were shown from a total of 46 countries. South Korean films are not shown because of the current political climate. Films critical of North Korea from anywhere in the world are not allowed and neither are sexually explicit films. Anything else goes, and the organizers try to get as many films and visitors to attend. Diplomatic connections or the personal initiative of filmmakers is what often results in a film being admitted. The result is often "an odd mix" of films that are not united by one genre. In recent years, the festival has enjoyed recent popularity abroad, mainly due to the success of South Korean cinema prompting foreign film enthusiasts' curiosity about the North. Consequentially, film submissions have increased and the selection of films has improved in quality.

The festival is one of the few North Korean functions that actively seeks connection with the outside world. Johannes Schönherr, author of North Korean Cinema: A History and a festival delegate in 2000, said "The Pyongyang International Film Festival is a big propaganda event and foreigners who attend the event become extras in the big propaganda show."

Most Japanese films and all American, Taiwanese and South Korean films are banned in North Korea. Taiwanese and South Korean films are banned because of the anti-communist nature of their countries.

== Major award winners ==
Year		Golden Torch Award	Best Director	Best Actor	Best Actress
1987	1st	(North Korea) A Broad Bellflower		(Iran) Jamshid Mashayekhi for The Grandfather	(North Korea) O Mi-ran for A Broad Bellflower
1990	2nd	(Iran) Little Bird of Happiness		(Egypt) Omar Sharif for The Puppeteer	(North Korea) O Mi-ran for Traces of Life
1992	3rd	(North Korea) Nation and Destiny (Parts 1 & 2)		(Iran) Alireza Khamseh for Apartment No.13	(India) Shabana Azmi for Libaas
1994	4th	(Vietnam) The Wild Reed (Cỏ lau) (directed by Vuong duc)		(Iran) Abolfazl Poorarab for The Bride	(North Korea) Kim Kyong-ae for The Kind-Hearted Girl
1996	5th	(China) Red Cherry			(China) Guo Keyu for Red Cherry
1998	6th	(North Korea) Myself in the Distant Future		(Iran) Khosrow Shakibai for Long Lost Sisters	(North Korea) Kim Hye-gyong for Myself in the Distant Future
2000	7th	(Iran) The Lost Love		(Syria) Bassam Kousa for The Extras	(North Korea) Jang Son-hui for The Earth of Love
2002	8th	(Russia) The Star		(North Korea) Kim Chol for Souls Protest	(Iran) Hedieh Tehrani for Party
2004	9th	(China) Gone Is the One Who Held Me Dearest in the World		(China) Wang Zhiwen for On the Other Side of the Bridge (《芬妮的微笑》)	(Russia) Svetlana Khodchenkova for Bless the Woman
2006	10th	(Germany) Before the Fall	(France) Stéphane Brizé for Not Here to Be Loved	(Belgium) Jan Decleir for Off Screen	(Switzerland) Sara Capretti for Sternenberg
2008	11th	(China) Assembly	(China) Feng Xiaogang for Assembly	(Bosnia and Herzegovina) Saša Petrović for It's Hard to Be Nice	(Iran) Bita Farrahi for Mainline
2010	12th	(China) Walking to School	(Iran) Khosro Masumi for Wind Blows in the Meadow	(Russia) Fyodor Dobronravov for A Man at Home	(Germany) Martina Gedeck for Bets and Wedding Dresses
2012	13th	(Germany) Lessons of a Dream	(North Korea) (Belgium) Nicholas Bonner, Anja Daelemans, Ryom Mi Hwa for Comrade Kim Goes Flying	(Germany) Daniel Brühl for Lessons of a Dream	(Russia) Polina Kutepova for Wind House
2014	14th	(Germany) My Beautiful Country	(China) Shi Wei(石伟) for The Ferry(我的渡口)	(China) Zhou Guangda(周光大) for The Ferry	(Russia) Svetlana Khodchenkova for Vasilisa
2016	15th	(North Korea) The Story of Our Home	(Russia) Oleg Asadulin for Green Carriage	(Russia) Andrey Merzlikin for Green Carriage	(North Korea) Paek Sol-mi for The Story of Our Home
2018	16th	(China) Old Aunt(老阿姨)(North Korean title for the film meant "The Woman Behind the Man")	(Russia) Klim Shipenko for Salyut	(China) Li Xuejian for Old Aunt(老阿姨)(North Korean title for the film meant "The Woman Behind the Man")	(China) He Saifei for Goddesses in the Flames of War
2019	17th	(Iran) Orange Days	(Russia) Aleksey Sidorov for T-34	(China) Shen Teng for Pegasus	(China) E Jingwen for The New King of Comedy
2025	18th	(Russia) (China) Red Silk	(Russia) (China) Andrey Volgin for Red Silk	(North Korea) the actor for Days and Nights of Confrontation(대결의 낯과 밤)	(Russia) Elizaveta Ischenko for Liar(Лгунья)

== See also ==
- International Cinema Hall
- Cinema of North Korea
