= A Broad Bellflower =

- Video cover
- Hangul: 도라지꽃
- Hanja: 桔梗
- RR: Dorajikkot
- MR: Torajikkot
- Directed by: People's Artist Jo Kyong-sun
- Written by: Ri Chun-gu
- Starring: People's Artiste Kim Ryong Jo; Merited Artiste O Mi Ran; Merited Artiste Song Yon Ok
- Cinematography: Pak Se Ung; People's Artist Choe Thae Guk
- Edited by: Ri Sun Sil
- Music by: Hwang Jin Yong
- Production company: Korea February 8 Studio
- Distributed by: Korea Film Export and Import Corporation; Mokran Video
- Release date: 1987
- Running time: 92 minutes
- Country: North Korea
- Language: Korean

A Broad Bellflower (Korean: 도라지꽃) is a 1987 North Korean drama film directed by Jo Kyong-sun from a script by Ri Chun-gu. Kim Ryong Jo, O Mi-ran, and Song Yon Ok star as lead roles within this movie. The film was screened at the 2013 Melbourne International Film Festival.

== Plot ==
The film centers on two orphan sisters, Song Rim (played by O Mi-ran) and Song Hwa, who live together in a rural mountain town. Song Rim aspires to develop their underdeveloped town. However, her lover Won Bong, who lives in the city, does not show much excitement for her plans, leading to their breakup. While Song Rim tries to expand the town, she dies in a mudslide caused by a rainstorm. Song Hwa continues the work of her late sister, and the town's development plans end up being successful. Won Bong eventually regrets breaking up with Song Rim, after her success in the endeavor he initially criticized.

== Background for production and reception ==
The film was produced by the Korea February 8 Film Studio. It was made in the context of the 1980s trend of North Korea, which aimed to honor "hidden heroes". Kim Jong Il inspected the demo film himself in 1987. The film tries to provide a solution to the problems of urban-centric developments, which led many young people to go to the city. The film was well-received by critics and audiences alike. O Mi-ran won the award for best actress at the 1987 Pyongyang International Film Festival.
