= Kim Il Sung Prize =

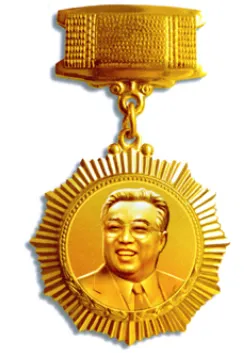
- Awarded for: Service to the values of Juche
- Country: North Korea
- Presented by: Government of North Korea

The Kim Il Sung Prize (Korean: 김일성상) is an award given by the Government of North Korea to persons in various fields who demonstrate exemplary service to the values of Juche idea. Past winners include the Korean composer Kim Won-gyun, judoka Kye Sun-hui, and the Arirang Festival.

== Recipients ==
- Hwang Jin Yong (Merited Artist and composer, vice director of the Moranbong Band)
- Ri Chun-hee (2012, news presenter)
- CNC instrument automatic streamline (2011)
- Among the People (book series, 2017)
- Arirang Festival
- Glorifying the Era of Juche (book series)
- Jong Kwan-chol (painter)
- Kim Won-gyun (composer, 1972)
- Ku Hui-chol (poet)
- Kye Sun-hui (judoka, 2003)
- Om Kil-son (actor and director)
- Pak Jong-ju (film director)
- Ri Hui-chan (scriptwriter)
- Rim Kum-dan (children's writer)
- Ro Ik-hwa (sculptor)
- Jong Yong-man (painter)
- O Tae-hyong (sculptor)
- U Chi-son (potter,1989)
- Kim Sok-hyong (academician)
- Kim Jong Il (leader of North Korea, February 1973 and March 2012)
- Kim Si Kwon (poet, 1988)
- Kim Pyong-hwa (writer of Arirang)
- Kim Chun-hui (weightlifting coach)
- People's Actress Kim Jong Hwa (actor)
- People's Actor Kim Ryong Rim (actor)
- Ri Hui Chan (film author)
- O Hye Yong (film author)
- Labour Hero People's Artist Pak Jong Ju (film director)
- Choe Il Sim (film author)
- Jang Yu Son (film author)
- Yui Ung Yong (film author)
- People's Artist Jon Jong Sok (cameraman)
- Pak Ho Il (film author)
- Kim Seryun (1992, screenwriter)
- Ri Chun-gu (screenwriter)
- Ho Mun Yong (orchestra conductor)
- Sol Thae Song (composer)

== See also ==
- International Kim Il Sung Prize
- Orders and medals of North Korea
- People's Prize
