= O Mi-ran =

North Korean actress (1954–2006)

- 오미란
- O Mi-ran holding the trophy of Best Actress, 1987
- Born: 28 August 1954; Chung-guyok, Pyongyang, North Korea
- Died: 27 June 2006 (aged 51)
- Education: National Theater Company Actors' Training Institute
- Occupation: Actress
- Notable work: A Broad Bellflower; Traces of Life
- Spouse: Unknown (m. 1982)
- Awards: Pyongyang International Film Festival Award for Best Actress (1987 and 1990); Merited Artiste (1983); People's Artiste (1987)

O Mi-ran (Korean: 오미란; 28 August 1954 – 27 June 2006) was a North Korean actress. Originally a dancer at the Pyongyang Art Troupe (now the Mansudae Art Troupe), she started acting in 1979, appearing in films like A Broad Bellflower and The Nation and Destiny, winning the Best Acting Award at the 1st and 2nd Pyongyang International Film Festival, and gaining a national reputation as a cinema star.

== Biography ==
She was born on 28 August 1954 in Ot'an-dong in Chung-guyok, Pyongyang. Her father O Hyang-mun was an actor from Jeongok-eup, a town in Yeoncheon County (now in South Korea), with a North Korean defector connected to the cinema of North Korea informing Yonhap News Agency that the younger O had originally suffered prejudice due to her South Korean ancestry. She also had several siblings, including actress O Gum-ran.

After she was educated at the National Theater Company Actors' Training Institute, she joined the Pyongyang Art Troupe (now the Mansudae Art Troupe) as a dancer in 1972. Afterwards, she joined the April 25 Film Studio in 1979 and started working in acting, with her debut in Gun Salute (1980). She later starred as Song Rim in the 1987 film A Broad Bellflower and appeared in the 1990 film Traces of Life, for which she won the Best Acting Award at the 1st and 2nd Pyongyang International Film Festival, respectively. She also appeared in the films Morning Star (1983), A Life Full of Ups and Downs (1989–1990), The Nation and Destiny (1999–2000), and Their Life Continues (2002). In 1990, she won Best Korean Actress in 1st New York Inter-Korean Film Festival.

Following the start of her film career, she subsequently became well known as a film star in the country, and she reportedly had as much monthly living expenses as the average North Korean general. She was named Merited Artiste in 1984 and People's Artiste in 1987. Yonhap News Agency called her "North Korea's top actress", with the Choson Film Yearbook calling her "a comrade who kindly guides the audience to the film world by her elegant and delicate expression, clear voice, and passion." Outside of the country, North Korean defectors consider her "the first North Korean star".

She was married to a painter since 1982. In 2007, Bradley K. Martin said that she was rumoured in the Pyongyang elite to have been among the mistresses kept by Kim Jong Il. O Mi-ran died on 27 June 2006 from breast cancer; she was 51. She was interred at the Patriotic Martyrs' Cemetery, with Kim Jong Il himself giving her grave a wreath in her memory.

== Filmography ==
Year	Title	Role	Source
1980	Gun Salute		
1982	Notes of a War Correspondent	Hye Kyong	
1983	Morning Star	Yong Hui	
1983	Following the Traces	Line Girl	
1984	Miles Along the Railway	Jong Hui	
1984	In Their Noble Image	So Jin A	
1984	Youth in the Shellfire	Pun Hui	
1986	The Birth of a New Government Part 1, 2	Ryong Mae	
1986	On Unforgettable Days	Son Nyo	
1987	A Broad Bellflower	Song Rim	
1987	Chief of the Military Safety Department		
1987	Revolutionary Soldier		
1988	Rights of Life	Po Kum	
1989	Traces of Life	So Jin Ju	
1989–1990	A Life Full of Ups and Downs Part 1-4	Rim So Yong	
1991	Musician Jong Ryul Song Part 1, 2	Jong Sol Song	
1992	Nation and Destiny Part 9-10: Cha Hong Gi	Hong Yong Ja	
1992	Nation and Destiny Part 11-13: Hong Yong Ja	Hong Yong Ja	
1994	My Mother Was a Hunter		
1998	Bloostained Mark		
1999–2000	Nation and Destiny Part 46-51: Choe Hyon	Sol Ran	
2002	Their Life Continues	So Jin Ju	
