= Hong Kil-dong (1986 film) =

North Korean period martial arts film

- DVD cover
- Hangul: 홍길동
- Hanja: 洪吉童
- RR: Hong Gildong
- MR: Hong Kiltong
- Directed by: Kim Kil-in
- Screenplay by: Kim Seryun
- Based on: Hong Gildong jeon
- Starring: Ri Yong-ho; Pak Chun-hui; Choe Sun-bok
- Cinematography: Jon Hong-sok
- Edited by: Om So-yong
- Music by: Jon Chang-il; Hwang Jin-yong
- Production companies: Korean Art Film Studio; Hong-Jong Corporation; Korea February 8 Film Studio
- Distributed by: Korea Film Export and Import Corporation; Mokép; Shochiku Home Video
- Release dates: June 15, 1986 (North Korea); July 31, 1988 (Soviet Union)
- Running time: 108 minutes
- Country: North Korea
- Language: Korean

Hong Kil-dong (Korean: 홍길동) is a 1986 North Korean historical drama film directed by Kim Kil-in from a screenplay by Kim Seryun. The film was based on the Hong Gildong jeon, an anonymous Korean novel about a Robin Hood-like bandit.

== Plot ==
In Joseon-era Korea, Hong Kil-dong is born in Hanseong (modern Seoul) as the illegitimate son of a nobleman. His stepmother tries to have him killed by bandits, but he is rescued by a monk who uses magic and martial arts. Hong goes on to train with the monk and defend the oppressed villagers, later fighting an invasion by Japanese ninjas.

== Release ==
Hong Kil-dong was released in 1986. It received a wide release in the Soviet Union and the Eastern bloc, and was very popular in Poland and Bulgaria.

== Reception ==
Hong Kil-dong is often listed as among the best North Korean films; authors have noted the influence of Shin Sang-ok, a South Korean director abducted by the North Korean regime in 1978 and forced to make films. It is also known for its lack of propaganda and its criticism of policies of the North Korean regime (most notably the Songbun policy). In 2002, North Korean defectors in South Korea were surveyed by The Chosun Ilbo, and declared it the best North Korean film. Simon Fowler of The Guardian wrote that "With heaped spoonfuls of Shaw Brothers-inspired kung fu, the film is unlike the entire pantheon of North Korean cinema that had gone before it. This is a film that needs no historical context to be watched and most unusually for North Korean film, can quite easily be enjoyed."
