= The Schoolgirl's Diary =

- French film poster
- Hangul: 한 녀학생의 일기
- Hanja: 한 女學生의 日記
- RR: Han nyeohaksaengui ilgi
- MR: Han nyŏhaksaengŭi ilgi
- Directed by: Jang In-hak
- Starring: Pak Mi-hyang
- Distributed by: Pretty Pictures (international) Korean Film Studio
- Release dates: September 2006 (Pyongyang International Film Festival); 29 November 2007 (Festival du film d'éducation)
- Country: North Korea
- Language: Korean

The Schoolgirl's Diary (or The Journal of a Schoolgirl) is a 2007 North Korean film directed by Jang In-hak. It debuted at the 2006 Pyongyang Film Festival as one of two films produced domestically that year, and was released in France at the end of 2007. In 2016, Radio Free Asia, a U.S. government-funded agency, incorrectly claimed that the film had been banned in North Korea. However, the film has been broadcast on North Korean state television KCTV and archived on the state-controlled news website Uriminzokkiri.

== Plot ==
The film depicts a North Korean teenager's struggle to understand her father's devotion to his country, and to scientific achievement at the expense of his own family's happiness. Spending the vast majority of his time at work as a computer engineer in a distant town, he leaves his two daughters, wife, and mother-in-law to live in their dilapidated rural home. In questioning her father's values, the rebellious teen begins to defy her mother, a hardworking librarian who spends her evenings translating scientific articles for her absentee husband.

The protagonist realizes how selfish she has been only after her father makes a major breakthrough in his scientific research and is lavished with praise for his self-sacrifice and devotion to the state.
