= Nation and Destiny =

1992–2002 North Korean film series

- Title screen
- Screenplay by: Ri Chun-gu et al.
- Produced by: Kim Jong Il
- Running time: 1,070 minutes (parts 1-13)
- Country: North Korea
- Language: Korean

Nation and Destiny (Korean: 민족과 운명; MR: Minjokkwa unmyŏng) is a 62-part North Korean film series released between 1992 and 2002. It aims to show that the Korean people "can live a glorious life only in the bosom of the Great Leader and socialist fatherland". Kim Jong Il personally chose the title and was extensively involved in the early episodes. Conceived as the largest film series ever produced in any country, it was the largest investment ever made in the history of North Korean cinema. Initially, the most senior writers, directors and actors were involved in the project and it was heavily promoted by the North Korean media. The series was projected to reach 100 episodes, but none have been released since 2002.

Nation and Destiny is notable for its scenes set in the West and South Korea, some of which even filmed on location in western countries not officially at war with North Korea, such as France. It is also noteworthy for its portrayal of the "anti-system figure" Han Sorya, who was purged in the 1960s by Kim Il Sung, in a positive role. This was the first time that an "anti-system figure" has been portrayed heroically on the North Korean screen. According to defectors' testimony, North Korean audiences were engrossed by its depiction of First World affluence.

== Synopsis ==
- Parts 1–4 were based on the life of Choe Deok-sin
- Parts 5–8 were based on the life of Isang Yun
- Parts 9–13 were based on the life of Choi Hong Hi
- Parts 14–16 were based on the life of Ri In-mo
- Parts 17–19 were based on the life of Ho Jong-suk
- Parts 20–25 were based on the life of naturalized Japanese women, including Rim Un-jong (Izumi Kiyoshi)
- Parts 26–36 were based on the life of workers
- Parts 46–51 were based on the life of Choe Hyon
- Parts 52–60 were based on the life of people past, present and future across generations
- Parts 61–62 were based on the life of peasants

== Part list ==
Some parts are said to be censored, as they were not aired on television during chronological airings of the series. Days where a censored part was to be aired featured a regular film until a non-censored part was scheduled to air. As they are censored, information on their creative staff is also unknown. Other films including the series Unsung Heroes have been censored during the transition of power from Kim Jong Il to Kim Jong Un.

Episode	Subject	Main Scriptwriter	Main Director	Photography	Music	Main Actors	Main Studio
1	Choe Deok Sin	Choe Sang Gun	Choe Sang Gun	Jong Ik Han	Ri Jong O	Choe Chang Su, Jon Jae Yon, Kim Ok Hui	Korean Film Studio
2	Choe Deok Sin	Choe Sang Gun	Choe Sang Gun	Ui Yun Song	Ri Jong O	Choe Chang Su, Kim Ok Hui, Pak Ki Ju	Korean Film Studio
3	Choe Deok Sin	Choe Sang Gun	Choe Sang Gun	Ui Yun Song	Ri Jong O	Choe Chang Su, Kim Jun Sik, Kim Ryong Rin	Korean Film Studio
4	Choe Deok Sin	Choe Sang Gun	Choe Sang Gun	Ui Yun Song	Ri Jong O	Choe Chang Su, Kim Jun Sik, Kim Ryong Rin	Korean Film Studio
5	Isang Yun	Choe Sang Gun	Choe Sang Gun	Jong Ik Han	Ri Jong O	So Kyong Sop, So Jin Hyang, Pak Yong Mi	Korean Film Studio
6	Isang Yun	Choe Sang Gun	Choe Sang Gun	Jong Ik Han	Ri Jong O	So Kyong Sop, So Jin Hyang, Pak Hyo Sin	Korean Film Studio
7	Isang Yun	Choe Sang Gun	Choe Sang Gun	Jong Ik Han	Ri Jong O	So Kyong Sop, So Jin Hyang, Pak Hyo Sin	Korean Film Studio
8	Isang Yun	Choe Sang Gun	Choe Sang Gun	Jong Ik Han	Ri Jong O	So Kyong Sop, So Jin Hyang, Pak Hyo Sin	Korean Film Studio
9	Choi Hong Hi	Choe Sang Gun	Choe Sang Gun	Jong Ik Han	Ri Jong O	Pak Ki Ju, Kim Jong Hwa, O Mi-ran	Korean Film Studio
10	Choi Hong Hi	Choe Sang Gun	Choe Sang Gun	Jong Ik Han	Ri Jong O	Pak Ki Ju, Kim Jong Hwa, O Mi-ran	Korean Film Studio
11	Hong Yong Ja	Choe Sang Gun	Choe Sang Gun	Jong Ik Han	Ri Jong O	Pak Ki Ju, O Mi-ran, Kim Jong Hwa	Korean Film Studio
12	Hong Yong Ja	Choe Sang Gun	Choe Sang Gun	Jong Ik Han	Ri Jong O	O Mi-ran, Kim Jong Un, Ri Sol Hui	Korean Film Studio
13	Hong Yong Ja	Choe Sang Gun	Choe Sang Gun	Choe Byong Ryol	Ri Jong O	O Mi-ran, Pak Ki Ju, Kim Jong Hwa	Korean Film Studio
14	Ri In Mo	Choe Sang Gun	Choe Sang Gun	Pak Se Ung	Ri Jong O	Jong Un Mo, Jong Chun Ran, Kim In Kon	Korean 2.8 Film Studio
15	Ri In Mo	Choe Sang Gun	Choe Sang Gun	Pak Se Ung	Ri Jong O	Jong Un Mo, Jong Chun Ran, Kim In Kon	Korean 2.8 Film Studio
16	Ri In Mo	Choe Sang Gun	Choe Sang Gun	Pak Se Ung	Ri Jong O	Jong Un Mo, Jong Chun Ran, Hong Kyong Ran	Korean 2.8 Film Studio
17	Ho Jong Suk	Ri Chun-gu	Ri Jae Jun	Choe Byong Ryol	Ri Jong O	Kim Yong Suk, Choe Chang Su, Kim Ok Hui	Korean Film Studio
18	Ho Jong Suk	Ri Chun-gu	Ri Jae Jun	Choe Byong Ryol	Ri Jong O	Kim Yong Suk, Choe Chang Su, Kim Ok Hui	Korean Film Studio
19	Ho Jong Suk	Ri Chun-gu	Ri Jae Jun	Choe Byong Ryol	Ri Jong O	Kim Yong Suk, Kim Kwang Mun, Hong Hwal Cho	Korean Film Studio
20							
21							
22							
23							
24							
25							
26	Workers	Ri Chun-gu	Kim Yong Ho	Ui Yong Song	Ri Jong O	Yu Won Jun, Ri Ji Yong, Ryu Kyong Ae	Korean Film Studio
27	Workers	Ri Chun-gu	Kim Yong Ho	Ui Yun Song	Ri Jong O	Yu Won Jun, Ri Ji Yong, Ryu Kyong Ae	Korean Film Studio
28	Workers	Ri Chun-gu	Kim Yong Ho	Ui Yun Song	Ri Jong O	Yu Won Jun, Ri Ji Yong, Ryu Kyong Ae	Korean Film Studio
29	Workers	Ri Chun-gu	Kim Yong Ho	Ui Yun Song	Ri Jong O	Yu Won Jun, Kwak Myong So, Mun Jong Ae	Korean Film Studio
30	Workers	Ri Chun-gu	Kim Yong Ho	Ui Yun Song	Ri Jong O	Yu Won Jun, Ri Ji Yong, Ryu Kyong Ae	Korean Film Studio
31	Workers	Ri Chun-gu	Kim Kil In	Han Ryong Su	Ri Jong O	Yu Won Jun, Ryu Kyong Ae, Ri Ji Yong	Korean Film Studio
32	Workers	Ri Chun-gu	Kim Kil In	Han Ryong Su	Ri Jong O	Yu Won Jun, Ryu Kyong Ae, Ri Ji Yong	Korean Film Studio
33	Workers	Ri Chun-gu	Kim Kil In	Han Ryong Su	Hwang Jin Yong	Yu Won Jun, Ri Kyong Hui, Ko Sung Ryong	Korean Film Studio
34	Workers	Ri Chun-gu	Kim Hyon Chol	Han Ryong Su	Ri Bong Ryong	Yu Won Jun, Ryu Kyong Ae, Ri Ji Yong	Korean Film Studio
35	Workers	Ri Chun-gu	Kim Hyon Chol	Han Ryong Su	Ri Bong Ryong	Yu Won Jun, Ryu Kyong Ae, Ri Ji Yong	Korean Film Studio
36	Workers	Ri Chun-gu	Kim Hyon Chol	Han Ryong Su	Ri Jong O	Yu Won Jun, Ryu Kyong Ae, Choe Kwang Song	Korean Film Studio
37							
38							
39							
40							
41							
42							
43							
44							
45							
46	Choe Hyon	Ri Chun-gu	Jo Kyong Sun	O Thae Yong	So Jong Kon	Choe Bong Sik, Ri Won Bok, O Mi-ran	Korean 4.25 Film Studio
47	Choe Hyon	Ri Chun-gu	Jo Kyong Sun	O Thae Yong	Pak Sang Su	Choe Bong Sik, Ri Won Bok, O Mi-ran	Korean 4.25 Film Studio
48	Choe Hyon	Ri Chun-gu	Jo Kyong Sun	O Thae Yong	Pak Sang Su	Choe Bong Sik, Ri Won Bok, O Mi-ran	Korean 4.25 Film Studio
49	Choe Hyon	Ri Chun-gu	Choe Bu Kil	O Thae Yong	Pae Yong Sam	Choe Bong Sik, Ri Won Bok, O Mi-ran	Korean 4.25 Film Studio
50	Choe Hyon	Ri Chun-gu	Choe Bu Kil	O Thae Yong	Pae Yong Sam	Choe Bong Sik, Ri Won Bok, O Mi-ran	Korean 4.25 Film Studio
51	Choe Hyon	Ri Chun-gu	Choe Bu Kil	O Thae Yong	Pae Yong Sam	Choe Bong Sik, O Mi-ran, Ri Won Bok	Korean 4.25 Film Studio
52	People of the past, present and future	Ri Chun-gu	Pak Jong Ju	Han Ryong Su	Ko Su Yong	Kim Jong Hwa, Kim Chol, Ri Kum Suk	Korean Film Studio
53	People of the past, present and future	Ri Chun-gu	Pak Jong Ju	Han Ryong Su	Ko Su Yong	Kim Ryong Rin, Ri Kum Suk, Kim Myong Mun	Korean Film Studio
54	People of the past, present and future	Ri Chun-gu	Pak Jong Ju	Han Ryong Su	Ko Su Yong	Kim Ryong Rin, Ri Kum Suk, So Sin Hyang	Korean Film Studio
55	People of the past, present and future	Ri Chun-gu	Pak Jong Ju	Han Ryong Su	Ko Su Yong	Kim Chol, Kim Son Ok, Kim Myong Mun	Korean Film Studio
56	People of the past, present and future	Ri Chun-gu	Pak Jong Ju	Han Ryong Su	Ko Su Yong	Kim Ryong Rin, Kim Jong Hwa, Ri Kum Suk	Korean Film Studio
57	People of the past, present and future	Pak Jong Ju	Pak Jong Ju	Han Ryong Su	Ko Su Yong	Kim Jong Hwa, Kim Ryong Rin, Choe Kwang Song	Korean Film Studio
58	People of the past, present and future	Pak Jong Ju	Pak Jong Ju	Han Ryong Su	Ko Su Yong	Kim Jong Hwa, Kim Ryong Rin, Ri Kum Suk	Korean Film Studio
59	People of the past, present and future	Pak Jong Ju	Pak Jong Ju	Han Ryong Su	Ko Su Yong	Kim Jong Hwa, Kim Ryong Rin, Hyon Chang Kol	Korean Film Studio
60	People of the past, present and future	Sol Ju Yong	Pak Jong Ju	Han Ryong Su	Ko Su Yong	Kim Jong Hwa, Kim Ryong Rin, Kim Chol	Korean Film Studio
61	Peasants	Ri Tok Yun	Jong Kon Jo	Jong Hong Sok	Song Tong Hwan	Kim Yong Suk, Choe Tae Hyon, Kim Kyong Ae	Korean Film Studio
62	Peasants	Ri Tok Yun	Jong Kon Jo	Jong Hong Sok	Song Tong Hwan	Choe Tae Hyon, Kim Yong Suk, Ri Yong Ho	Korean Film Studio

== Music ==
The use of South Korean popular songs was part of a "mosquito-net strategy", whereby it was hoped the North Korean public would be immunised to the culture of the outside world by gradual exposure.

Some of the music used throughout the series include (but not limited to),

- Nakhwa Yusu / Falling Blossom (낙화유수) - Episode 1 & 10
- Hey, Jude - The Beatles - Episode 2
- Rock Me - ABBA - Episode 2 & 5
- Colonel Bogey March - Episode 5 & 9
- Paris au mois d'août - Charles Aznavour - Episode 12
- Hongdoya Uji Mala / Hongdo, Don't Cry (홍도야 우지 마라) - Episode 12
- Sen'yū - Episode 13
- Geuttae Geusalam / The One I Remember (그때 그사람) - Episode 13
- Mamma Mia - ABBA - Episode 15
