= List of awards and honours received by Kim Il Sung =

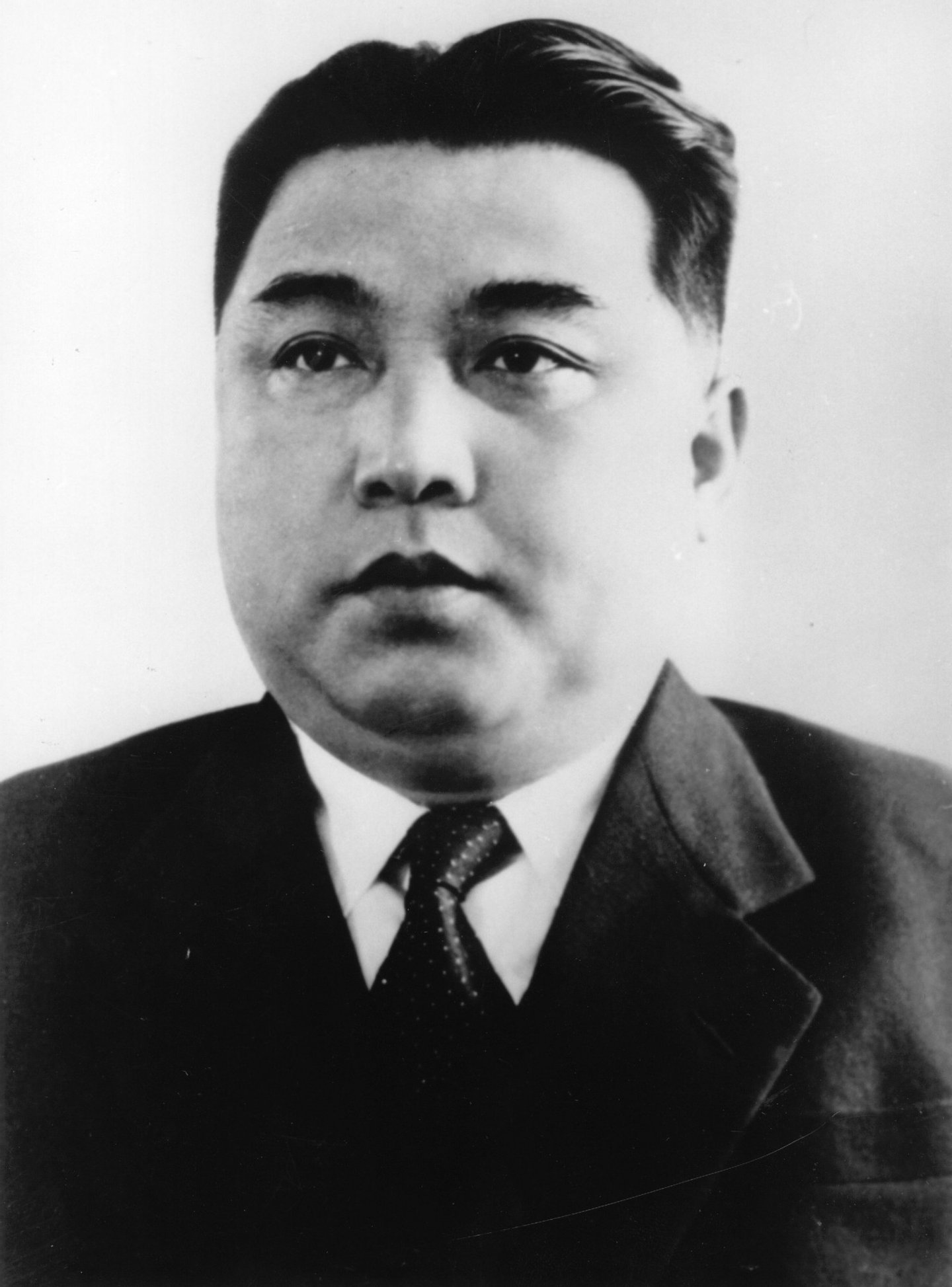
Kim Il Sung

Kim Il Sung was the founder and first leader of North Korea. According to North Korean sources, the country awarded him "the title of Hero of the DPRK three times, the title of Labour Hero of the DPRK, 26 orders and 3 medals". In addition, foreign countries and organizations conferred upon him 74 orders and 152 medals.

== North Korean ==
Award or decoration	Date
Order of the National Flag (1st Class with Neck Chain, six times)	6 February 1951, 28 July 1953
Hero of Labor	7 September 1958
Hero of the Republic (thrice)	28 July 1953, 15 April 1972, April 1982
Order Commemoration of the Founding of the Democratic People's Republic of Korea (twice)	
Order of Freedom and Independence (1st Class, twice)	1953
Medal for Agricultural Merits	
Medal of Military Service Honour	
Commemorative Order "60th Year Anniversary of the Fatherland Liberation War Victory"	posthumous
Commemorative Order "70th Year Anniversary of the Fatherland Liberation War Victory"	posthumous

== Foreign ==
Award or decoration	Country	Date
Order of Liberty (1st Class)	PSR Albania	June 1956
National Gold Medal	Laos	3 February 1992
Order of Lenin (twice)	Soviet Union	14 April 1972, 14 April 1987
Jubilee Medal "In Commemoration of the 100th Anniversary of the Birth of Vladimir Ilyich Lenin"	Soviet Union	8 May 1970
Order of the Red Banner	Soviet Union	29 August 1945
Medal "For the Victory over Japan"	Soviet Union	30 September 1945
Jubilee Medal "Thirty Years of Victory in the Great Patriotic War 1941–1945"	Soviet Union	15 August 1975
Jubilee Medal "Forty Years of Victory in the Great Patriotic War 1941–1945"	Soviet Union	9 May 1985
Order of the Yugoslav Star (Great Star)	Socialist Federal Republic of Yugoslavia	29 August 1977
Xirka Ġieħ ir-Repubblika (Honorary Member)	Malta	1 August 1985
Order of Karl Marx (twice)	East Germany	15 April 1982, 15 April 1987
National Order of the Thousand Hills (Grand Cross)	Rwanda	15 June 1978
Star of the Republic of Indonesia (1st Class)	Indonesia	10 April 1965
Order of Georgi Dimitrov (twice)	Bulgaria	October 1973, 11 April 1987
100th Anniversary of the Birth of Georgi Dimitrov	Bulgaria	28 January 1983
Order of Mono (Grand Cross)	Togo	11 September 1974
Order of José Martí (twice)	Cuba	13 April 1982, 10 March 1986
Order of Playa Girón	Cuba	4 April 1987
Order of the Grand Star of Honour of Socialist Ethiopia (Grand Cross)	Derg	10 November 1985
Augusto Cesar Sandino Order (Batalla de San Jacinto, 1st Class)	Nicaragua	25 August 1986
Gold Star Order	Vietnam	9 September 1988
Order of Victory of Socialism	SR Romania	15 April 1987
Order of the Star of the Romanian Socialist Republic (twice, 1st Class and 1st Class with Band)	SR Romania	6 July 1972, 9 April 1982
Order of Klement Gottwald	Czechoslovakia	29 January 1987
Order of the White Lion (1st Class with Collar)	Czechoslovakia	7 June 1973
30th Anniversary of Liberation Medal	Czechoslovakia	May 1975
Order of Polonia Restituta (Grand Cross, 1st Class)	Poland	5 July 1956
Order of the Umayyads (Grand Belt)	Ba'athist Syria	25 September 1974
National Order of Mali (Grand Cross)	Mali	18 May 1976
Order of the Star of Palestine	Palestine	26 July 1993
Royal Order of Cambodia (Grand Cross)	Cambodia First Kingdom of Cambodia	9 October 1965
Order of National Independence	Cambodia First Kingdom of Cambodia	
National Order of Madagascar (Grand Cross, 1st Class)	Madagascar	6 October 1985
Order of Sukhbaatar (twice)	Mongolia	January 1953, 29 June 1988
Order of Eduardo Mondlane (1st Class)	PR Mozambique	14 July 1984
Order of the Gold Star of Nahouri	Burkina Faso	5 September 1985
Order of Operation Bokassa (Grand Cross)	Central African Empire	1 May 1978
Order of Central African Merit (Grand Cross with Necklace)	Central African Empire	1 May 1978
November 17 Medal	International Union of Students	17 January 1986
Order of Independence (Grand Cross)	Equatorial Guinea	18 April 1992
Ongulumbashe Medal	Namibia	11 September 1992
Order of the Equatorial Star	Gabon	May 1977
Order of Amílcar Cabral	Guinea-Bissau	15 April 1982
30th Anniversary of Victory Over Fascist Germany	PR Bulgaria	June 1975
National Order of Merit (Grand Cross)	Mauritania	30 May 1975
National Order of the Republic	Burundi	22 March 1979
Order of Merit of the People's Republic of Poland (Grand Ribbon)	Poland	31 March 1987
Order of the Great 1st September Revolution (twice)	Libyan Arab Jamahiriya	30 September 1989, 18 April 1992
Order of the Grand Conqueror	Libyan Arab Jamahiriya	
Order of Excellence of Guyana	Guyana	
National Order of the Leopard (Grand Cordon)	Zaire	April 1992
National Order of Niger (Grand Cross)	Niger	20 September 1986
Order of the Grand Companion of Freedom (1st Class)	Zambia	26 February 1988
Congolese Order of Merit (Grand Cross)	PR Congo	14 March 1983
Order of the Nile (Necklace)	Egypt	4 April 1983
National Order of the People's Republic of Benin (Grand Cross)	PR Benin	10 July 1976
National Order of the Lion (Grand Cross)	Senegal	
Order of the 14th of October	South Yemen	
National Order of Merit (Grand Cross)	Guinea	2005 (posthumous)

== See also ==
- Awards and decorations received by Kim Jong-il
- Awards and decorations received by Leonid Brezhnev
- List of awards and honours received by Nikita Khrushchev
- List of awards and honours bestowed upon Joseph Stalin
- List of awards and honours bestowed upon Fidel Castro
- List of awards and honours bestowed upon Muammar Gaddafi
- Awards and decorations received by Josip Broz Tito
- Orders, decorations, and medals of North Korea
- List of things named after Kim Il Sung
- International Friendship Exhibition
