= List of awards and honours received by Kim Jong Il =

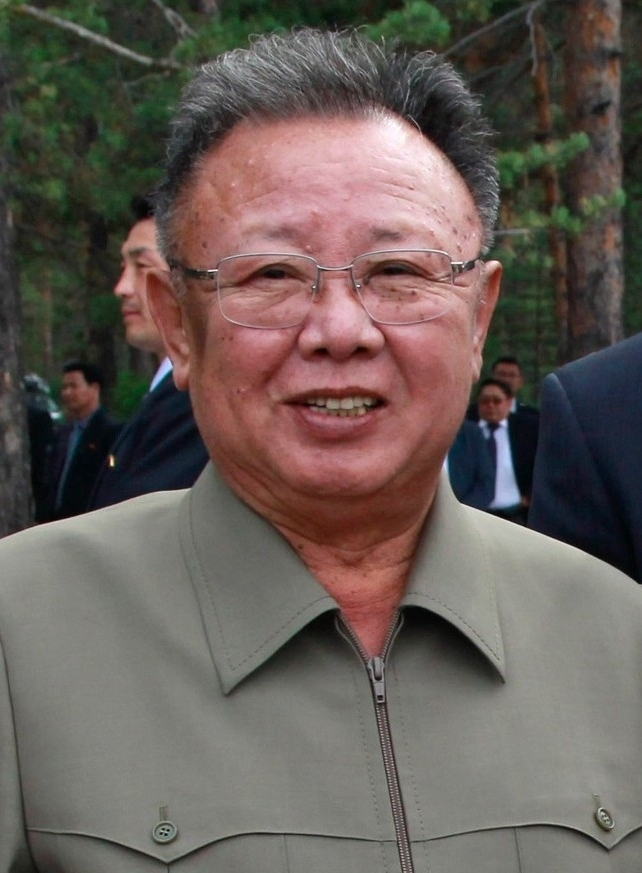
Kim Jong Il

This is a list of awards and decorations received by Kim Jong Il. According to North Korean sources, North Korea "conferred ... the title of Hero of the DPRK four times, the Order of Kim Il Sung four times, Kim Il Sung Prize two times, 22 orders and 9 medals" on Kim Jong Il. Additionally, "many countries and international organizations conferred 39 orders, 141 medals and 201 honorary titles on him".

== North Korean ==
Award or decoration	Date
Order of Kim Il Sung (four times)	3 April 1979, 7 April 1982, 7 April 1992, 29 March 2012
Kim Il Sung Prize (twice)	February 1973, 29 March 2012
International Kim Il-sung Prize	16 February 2007
Hero of the Republic (four times)	15 February 1975, 15 February 1982, February 1992, 19 December 2011
Order of the National Flag (1st Class with Neck Chain, five times individually and four times with Hero of the Republic)	1982
Order of the National Flag (2nd Class)	
Order of Freedom and Independence (1st Class, twice)	
Order of Freedom and Independence (2nd Class)	1960s
Order of Soldier's Honor (1st Class)	
Order of Labor (thrice)	
Commemorative Order "Founding of the Democratic People's Republic of Korea"	
Commemorative Order "50th Anniversary of the Foundation of the Democratic People's Republic of Korea"	
Commemorative Order "60th Anniversary of the Foundation of the Democratic People's Republic of Korea"	
Commemorative Order "Foundation of the Foundation of the People's Army"	
30th Anniversary of the Publication of the Rural Theses Order	
Commemorative Order "60th Anniversary of the People's Army"	
Commemorative Order "40th Anniversary of Fatherland Liberation War Victory"	
Order of the Red Banner of Three Great Revolutions	
Commemorative Order "Capital Construction"	
Commemorative Medal "The Foundation of the Democratic People's Republic of Korea"	
Commemorative Medal "60th Anniversary of the Foundation of the Democratic People's Republic of Korea"	
Commemorative Medal "Fatherland Liberation"	
Merited Service Medal (twice)	
Commemorative Medal "Mt. Kumgang Power Plant Construction"	
Commemorative Medal "Pyongyang-Nampho Highway Construction"	
Commemorative Medal "Huicheon Power Plant Construction"	
Commemorative Order "60th Year Anniversary Of the Fatherland Liberation War Victory"	posthumous
Commemorative Order "70th Year Anniversary of the Fatherland Liberation War Victory"	posthumous

== Foreign ==
Award or decoration	Country	Date
National Order of Merit (Grand Cross)	Guinea	20 April 2005
Order of Kiyatikun	Laos	April 1992
National Gold Medal	Laos	
National Order of Niger (Grand Cross)	Niger	20 September 1986
Order of the Republic (Collar)	Egypt	4 April 1983
Order of the Nile (Collar)	Egypt	
Order of Independence (Grand Cross)	Equatorial Guinea	13 April 1992
Order of Democracy	Colombia	12 January 1995
Jubilee Medal "In Commemoration of the 100th Anniversary of the Birth of Vladimir Ilyich Lenin"	Soviet Union	
Jubilee Medal "Forty Years of Victory in the Great Patriotic War 1941–1945"	Soviet Union	9 May 1985
Jubilee Medal "50 Years of Victory in the Great Patriotic War 1941–1945"	Russia	22 March 1995
Medal "In Commemoration of the 300th Anniversary of Saint Petersburg"	Russia	2 December 2005
Jubilee Medal "60 Years of Victory in the Great Patriotic War 1941–1945"	Russia	10 March 2005
Jubilee Medal "65 Years of Victory in the Great Patriotic War 1941–1945"	Russia	4 May 2010
Medal of Zhukov	Russia	
Order of Solidarity	Cuba	31 January 1992
National Order of the Leopard (Grand Cordon)	Zaire	1992
Commemoration Medal of the 80th Anniversary of Independence	Finland	
Royal Order of Cambodia (Grand Cross)	Cambodia	31 July 2004
Order of National Independence (Grand Collar)	Cambodia	31 July 2004
Legion of Holy Jerusalem	Palestine	27 July 1993
World Friendship Order	Libyan Arab Jamahiriya	February 2002
Order of the Grand Conqueror	Libyan Arab Jamahiriya	
National Order of the Thousand Hills (Grand Cross)	Rwanda	May 1983
Most Brilliant Order of the Sun	Namibia	20 March 2008
Order of the Welwitschia (1st Class)	Namibia	26 August 2002
Ongulumbashe Medal	Namibia	11 September 1992
National Order of the Lion (Grand Cross)	Senegal	June 2011
Order of Central African Merit (Grand Cross)	Central African Republic	9 July 1983
Order of Roraima of Guyana	Guyana	4 December 1983
Order of the Grand Star of Honour of Socialist Ethiopia (1st Class)	Derg	16 November 1985
National Order of Mali (Grand Cross)	Mali	17 December 1992

== See also ==
- Awards and decorations received by Kim Il-sung
- Awards and decorations received by Leonid Brezhnev
- List of awards and honours received by Nikita Khrushchev
- List of awards and honours bestowed upon Joseph Stalin
- List of awards and honours bestowed upon Fidel Castro
- List of awards and honours bestowed upon Muammar Gaddafi
- Awards and decorations received by Josip Broz Tito
- Orders, decorations, and medals of North Korea
- International Friendship Exhibition
