= List of awards and honours received by Nikita Khrushchev =

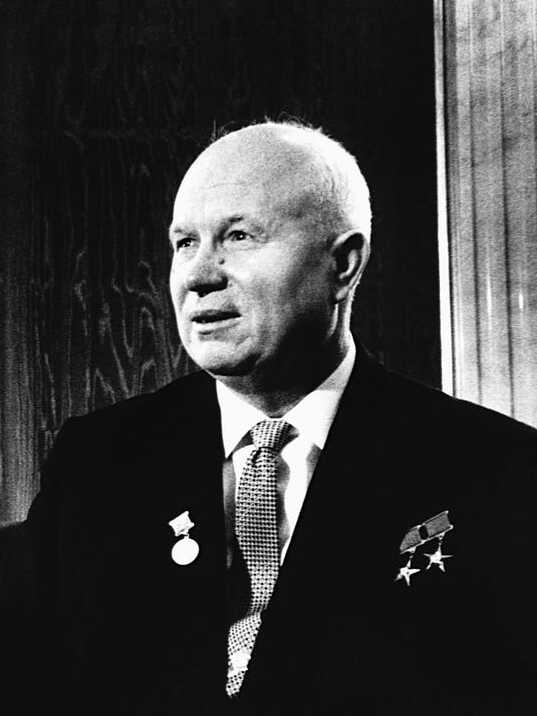
Nikita Khrushchev

This is a list of awards and honours received by Nikita Khrushchev, a Soviet political leader who served as both General Secretary of the Communist Party of the Soviet Union (1953–1964) and Premier of the Soviet Union (1958–1964).

== USSR ==
Award or decoration	Date	Awarded for	Citation
Hero of the Soviet Union	16 April 1964	In connection with the 70th anniversary of his birth and for "outstanding services to the Communist Party and the Soviet state in the construction of a communist society, strengthening the economic and defensive power of the Soviet Union, developing the fraternal friendship of the peoples of the USSR, implementing Lenin's peace-loving policy, and noting exceptional services in the fight against Hitler's invaders during the Great Patriotic War."	
Hero of Socialist Labour	16 April 1954; 8 April 1957; 17 June 1961	In connection with his 60th birthday and noting his services to the Soviet state. For "outstanding services in the development and implementation of measures for the reclamation of virgin and fallow lands." For "outstanding services in leadership in the creation and development of the rocket industry, science, and technology, and the successful implementation of the world's first manned space flight by a Soviet citizen on the Vostok satellite ship, ushering in a new era in space exploration."	
Order of Lenin	13 May 1935; 16 April 1944; 23 January 1948; 16 April 1954; 8 April 1957; 17 June 1961; 17 April 1964	For "successful fulfillment of the party and government's decision, ensuring Bolshevik pace in work, and timely completion of the construction of the first stage of the Moscow Metro." In connection with the 50th anniversary of his birth and "taking into account his outstanding services to the party and the Soviet people." In connection with the 30th anniversary of the establishment of Soviet power in Ukraine and "successes in the development and restoration of industry, agriculture, science, culture, and arts." Awarded in lieu with the first Hero of the Socialist Labour Awarded in lieu with the second Hero of the Socialist Labour Awarded in lieu with the third Hero of the Socialist Labour Awarded in lieu with the Hero of the Soviet Union	
Order of the Red Banner of Labour	7 February 1939	For "outstanding achievements in agriculture, and in particular for overfulfilling plans for basic agricultural work."	
Order of Suvorov, 1st class	1945		
Order of Suvorov, 2nd class	1943		
Order of Kutuzov, 1st class	1943		
Order of the Patriotic War, 1st class	1945		
Medal "To a Partisan of the Patriotic War", 1st class		Awarded to partisans, to leaders and organizers of partisan units.	
Medal "For the Defence of Stalingrad"	1943	For all the participants of the defence of Stalingrad	
Medal "For the Victory over Germany in the Great Patriotic War 1941–1945"	May 1945	To all civilian and military personnel in the Soviet army, navy and the NKVD.	
Medal "For Valiant Labour in the Great Patriotic War 1941–1945"	1945	Awarded to workers, technicians and employees of industry and transport, farmers and agricultural experts, scientists, artists, authors, officials, party members, trade union members and members of other public organisations who contributed to the Soviet war effort against Germany.	
Medal "For the Restoration of the Black Metallurgy Enterprises of the South"	1948	Awarded to all citizens who took part in the restoration of the Black Metallurgic Enterprises of the Soviet Union which were destroyed during the Great Patriotic War.	
Jubilee Medal "In Commemoration of the 100th Anniversary since the Birth of Vladimir Il'ich Lenin"	1970	Awarded to commemorate the 100th birth anniversary of Vladimir Lenin.	
Jubilee Medal "Twenty Years of Victory in the Great Patriotic War 1941–1945"	1965	To all civilian and military personnel in the Soviet army, navy and the NKVD.	
Medal "For the Development of Virgin Lands"		Collective farmers, workers on state farms, common labourers, Party and state officials, trade union members and Komsomol members for contributions they made during the Virgin Lands Campaign	
Jubilee Medal "40 Years of the Armed Forces of the USSR"	1958	Awarded to marshals, generals, admirals, officers and servicemen to celebrate the 40th anniversary of the Soviet armed forces	
Jubilee Medal "50 Years of the Armed Forces of the USSR"	1968	Awarded to marshals, generals, admirals, officers and servicemen to celebrate the 50th anniversary of the Soviet armed forces	
Medal "In Commemoration of the 800th Anniversary of Moscow"	1947	Awarded to all citizens who participated in the restoration and reconstruction of Moscow.	
Medal "In Commemoration of the 250th Anniversary of Leningrad"	1957	Awarded to all citizens who participated in the restoration and reconstruction of Leningrad.	
Lenin Peace Prize	1959		
State Prize of the Ukrainian SSR named after T. G. Shevchenko	1959	"For the great contribution to the development of Ukrainian Soviet socialist culture."	
Honorary Miner of the USSR	7 April 1960		
Miner's Glory Medal, 1st class	7 April 1960		

== Russia ==
Award or decoration	Date	Awarded for	Citation
Order of Merit of Ingushetia	29 April 2006 (posthumously)	"For outstanding services in restoring historical justice in relation to repressed peoples, the rights and freedoms of the Ingush people."	

== Foreign ==
Award or decoration	Country	Date	Citation
Hero of the People's Republic of Bulgaria	Bulgaria	1964	
Order of Georgi Dimitrov	Bulgaria	1964	
Order of the White Lion, 1st class	Czechoslovakia	1955	
Commemorative Medal for the 20th Anniversary of the Slovak National Uprising	Czechoslovakia	1964	
Order of Karl Marx	East Germany	1964	
Order of Sukhbaatar	Mongolia	1964	
Order of the Star of the Romanian Socialist Republic, 1st class	Romania	1964	
Grand Cordon with necklace of the Order of the Nile	United Arab Republic	1964	
Gold Medal 'Laying the First Stone of the Aswan Dam'	United Arab Republic	1964	
Sadd el-Aali Medal 'Diversion of the Nile River'	United Arab Republic	1964	
Silver Jubilee Medal	World Peace Council	1960	

== See also ==
- Awards and decorations received by Kim Jong-il
- Awards and decorations received by Kim Il-sung
- Awards and decorations received by Leonid Brezhnev
- List of awards and honours received by Joseph Stalin
- List of awards and honours bestowed upon Fidel Castro
- List of awards and honours bestowed upon Muammar Gaddafi
- Awards and decorations received by Josip Broz Tito
- Orders, decorations, and medals of the Soviet Union
