= List of awards and honours received by Joseph Stalin =

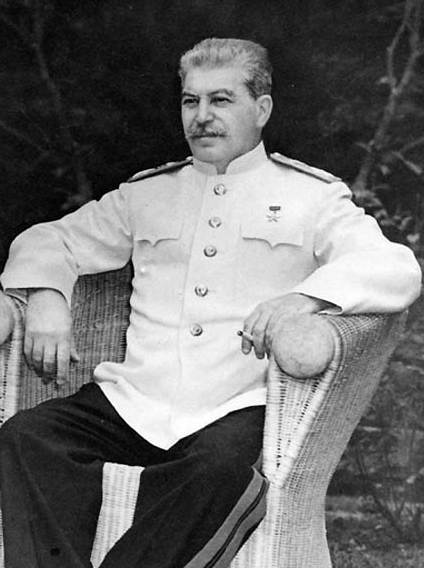
Joseph Stalin

This is a list of awards and honorary titles received by Joseph Stalin, a Georgian revolutionary and Soviet political leader who served as both General Secretary of the Communist Party of the Soviet Union (1922–1952) and Chairman of the Council of Ministers of the Soviet Union (1941–1953).

== USSR ==
Award or decoration		Date	Awarded for
	Marshal's Star	6 March 1943	Promoted to Marshal of the Soviet Armed Forces.
	Hero of the Soviet Union	26 June 1945	"For leading the Red Army in the defense of the Soviet Union and its capital Moscow, and for leading the fight against Hitler's Germany."
	Hero of Socialist Labour	20 December 1939	"For exceptional services in organizing the Bolshevik Party, building a socialist society in the USSR and strengthening friendship between the peoples of USSR."
	Order of Victory	29 July 1944; 26 June 1945	"For exceptional services in organizing and conducting offensive operations of the Red Army, which led to the largest defeat of the German army and to a radical change in the situation on the front of the struggle against the German invaders in favor of the Red Army." "For exceptional services in the organization of all the armed forces of the Soviet Union and their skillful leadership in the Great Patriotic War, which ended in complete victory over Nazi Germany."
	Order of Lenin	20 December 1939; 26 June 1945; 20 December 1949	"For exceptional services in organizing the Bolshevik Party, building a socialist society in the USSR and strengthening friendship between the peoples of USSR." "For leading the Red Army in the defense of the Soviet Union and its capital Moscow, and for leading the fight against Hitler's Germany." "In connection with his 70th birthday and taking into account his exceptional merits in strengthening and developing the USSR, building communism in the country, organizing the defeat of the German fascist invaders and Japanese imperialists, as well as in restoring the national economy in the post-war period."
	Order of the Red Banner	27 November 1919; 13 February 1930; 30 November 1944	"In commemoration of his services in the defense of Petrograd and selfless work on the Southern Front, during the Russian Civil War." "For great services on the front of social construction." "For 20 years of service"
	Order of Suvorov, 1st class	6 November 1943	"For the correct leadership of the operations of Red Army in the Patriotic War against the German invaders and the successes achieved."
	Medal "For the Defence of Moscow"	20 July 1944	For all the participants of the defence of Moscow.
80px80px	Medal "For the Victory over Germany in the Great Patriotic War 1941–1945"	May 1945	To all civilian and military personnel in the Soviet army, navy and the NKVD.
	Medal "For the Victory over Japan"	October 1945	To all civilian and military personnel in the Soviet army, navy and the NKVD, who took part in the Soviet–Japanese War.
	Jubilee Medal "XX Years of the Workers' and Peasants' Red Army"	1938	Awarded to marshals, generals, admirals, officers and servicemen to celebrate the 20th anniversary of the Soviet armed forces.
	Medal "In Commemoration of the 800th Anniversary of Moscow"	September 1947	Awarded to all citizens who participated in the restoration and reconstruction of Moscow.

== Soviet republics ==
Award or decoration	Date	Republic
Order of the Red Star, 1st class	18 August 1922	Bukharan People's Soviet Republic

== Foreign ==
Award or decoration	Country	Date
Order of the White Lion, 1st class	Czechoslovakia	1945 (Note: Although Stalin was awarded the Order of the White Lion, he refused to accept the award.)
Military Order of the White Lion, "For Victory", 1st class	Czechoslovakia	1945
Czechoslovak War Cross	Czechoslovakia	1943; 1945
Hero of the Mongolian People's Republic	Mongolia	17 December 1949
Order of Sukhbaatar	Mongolia	1945; 17 December 1949
Medal "For the Victory over Japan"	Mongolia	1945
Medal "25 Years of the Mongolian People's Revolution"	Mongolia	1946
Order of the Republic	(Tuvan People's Republic) Tuva	1943

== Honorary titles ==
=== USSR ===
Title	Place	Date
Honorary Red Army soldier of the 1st Cavalry Army	USSR	1923
Honorary Deputy of the City Council of Yuzovka	Ukrainian SSR	9 March 1924
Honorary Miner of Yuzovka	Ukrainian SSR	9 March 1924
Honorary Cadet of the Chirchiq Higher Tank Command and Engineering School	Uzbek SSR	1925
Honorary Rector of the Communist University of the Toilers of the East	Russian SFSR	
Honorary Member of the Academy of Sciences of the Soviet Union	Russian SFSR	1939
Honorary Member of the VASKhNIL	Russian SFSR	1939

=== Foreign ===
Title	Country	Date	Notes
Honorary Citizen of Varna	Bulgaria	1949	
Honorary Citizen of České Budějovice	Czechoslovakia (present-day Czech Republic)		Title revoked on 15 May 2017
Honorary Citizen of Košice	Czechoslovakia (present-day Slovakia)		Title revoked in 2007
Honorary Citizen of Budapest	Hungary	7 November 1947	Title revoked on 29 April 2004
Honorary Citizen of Szczecin	Poland	1949	
Honorary Citizen of Wrocław	Poland	1949	
Honorary Distinguished Chieftain of Mohawk nation	Kahnawake	1942	Chieftain's War bonnet was gifted to Stalin by Native American tribes. It is now on display in the State museum of modern history of Russia (formerly "Museum of Revolution").

== See also ==
- Awards and decorations received by Kim Jong-il
- Awards and decorations received by Kim Il-sung
- Awards and decorations received by Leonid Brezhnev
- List of awards and honours received by Nikita Khrushchev
- List of awards and honours bestowed upon Fidel Castro
- List of awards and honours bestowed upon Muammar Gaddafi
- Awards and decorations received by Josip Broz Tito
- Orders, decorations, and medals of the Soviet Union
