= Purple Heart (disambiguation) =

The Purple Heart is a United States military decoration.

Purple Heart may also refer to:

== Awards ==
- Purple Heart (Ethiopia), given to military personnel wounded during a war action
- DEA Purple Heart Award, given by the U.S. Drug Enforcement Administration
- Law Enforcement Purple Heart, a generic term to describe an American law enforcement medal
- Texas Purple Heart Medal, given within the Texas Military Forces

== Film ==
- The Purple Heart, a 1944 American war film starring Dana Andrews
- Purple Hearts (1984 film), an American war film starring Ken Wahl and Cheryl Ladd
- Purple Heart (film), a 2006 American war film by Bill Birrell
- Purple Hearts (2022 film), an American romance film created for Netflix

== Music ==
- The Purple Hearts (Australian band), a 1960s R&B and rock group
- Purple Hearts (British band), a 1970s/1980s English mod revival group
- 💜 a.k.a. The Purple Heart, a 2018 EP by American singer-songwriter Left at London
- Purple Hearts (soundtrack), from the 2022 film
- Purple Hearts, a song by Kendrick Lamar, Summer Walker, and Ghostface Killah from Mr. Morale & The Big Steppers, 2022
- Purple Hearts, a song by Lil Poppa, 2018
- Purple Heart, a song by Odetari, and Don Toliver from Door to Dusk, 2023

== Plants ==
- Peltogyne, genus of tropical deciduous trees, whose heartwood is sold under the name purpleheart or purple heart
- Tradescantia pallida 'Purpurea', a herbaceous cultivar with purple foliage commonly grown as an onamental perennial or houseplant

== Other uses ==
- Purple Heart Trail, a highway name used in the United States
- Purple Heart, a novel by Patricia McCormick
- Purple Heart, a main character in the Hyperdimension Neptunia video game series
- Purple Heart Memorial Bridge, in the Alexandria, Louisiana area
- Dexamyl or "purple hearts", an obsolete antidepressant used as a recreational drug
