= Mirta Roses Periago =

Argentine epidemiologist

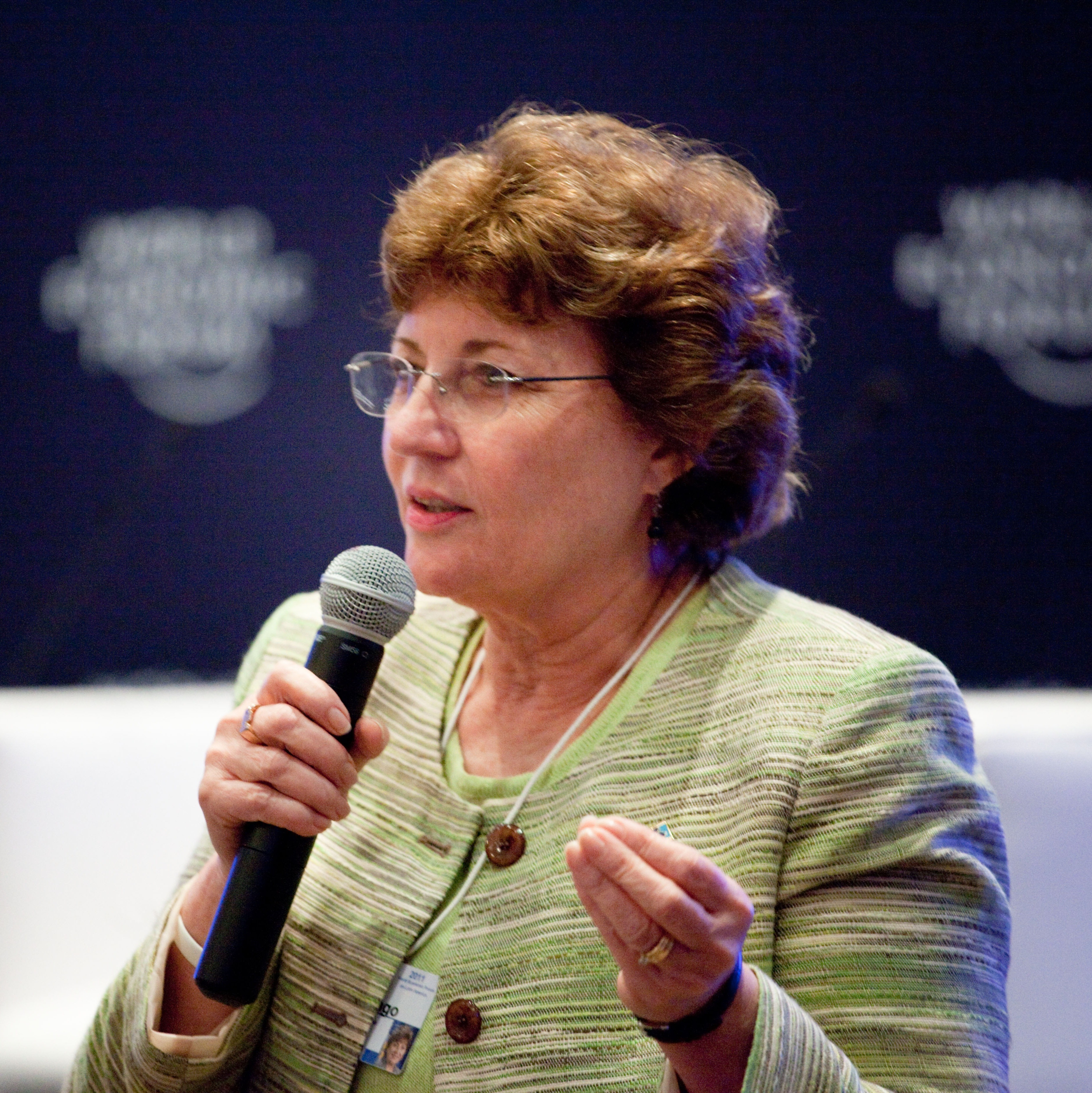
- Mirta Roses Periago at the World Economic Forum on Latin America in 2011
- Education: Universidad Nacional de Córdoba
- Scientific career
- Fields: Epidemiology
- Workplaces: Pan American Health Organization

Mirta Roses Periago is an Argentine epidemiologist who served as Director of the Pan American Health Organization (PAHO) from 2003 until 2013.

== Education ==
Roses Periago received a medical degree in 1969 from Universidad Nacional de Córdoba, Argentina, and additional qualifications in tropical medicine, public health, and epidemiology at other institutions in Argentina. Her graduate studies also include a diploma in public health (1974) and a specialization in epidemiology (1982) at the Escuela de Salud Pública in Buenos Aires, Argentina, as well as the specialist degree in clinical medicine and epidemiology of infectious diseases at the Universidad de Buenos Aires, in 1976.

== Career ==
Roses Periago took office as director of PAHO on February 1, 2003, for an initial five-year term, the first woman to head the organization as well as the first female Regional Director of the World Health Organization; she was re-elected in 2007. After the end of her second term, she retired and returned to Buenos Aires.

Roses Periago also serves on the Lancet-O'Neill Institute Georgetown University Commission on Global Health and Law. In early 2020, WHO Director General Tedros Adhanom Ghebreyesus appointed her as one of his six special envoys on Coronavirus disease 2019 (COVID-19) to provide strategic advice and high-level political advocacy.

== Other activities ==
- Gulbenkian Global Mental Health Platform, Member of the Advisory Committee
- Drugs for Neglected Diseases Initiative (DNDi), Member of the Friends of DNDi
- Global Network for Neglected Tropical Diseases, Special Ambassador
- Global Fund to Fight AIDS, Tuberculosis and Malaria, Alternate Member of the Board (representing the Latin American and Caribbean group)
- Global Polio Eradication Initiative (GPEI), Member of the Polio Transition Independent Monitoring Board (TIMB)
- Mundo Sano, Member of the Advisory Board
- RBM Partnership To End Malaria, Member of the Board
- German Ministry of Health, Member of the International Advisory Board on Global Health (2018-2019)

== Recognition ==
=== Awards ===
Roses Periago's many awards include Civil Order of Health (Spain); Order of Public Health, the Order of Marshall Santa Cruz (Armed Forces), the Agricultural Medal of Merit, and the Order of Bolívar the Liberator (Bolivia); Decoration of Merit in Public Health and Honorato Vásquez National Order (Ecuador); José de Marcoleta Order and the Pedro Joaquín Chamorro Order of Freedom (Nicaragua); and Order of Merit of Duarte, Sánchez and Mella (Dominican Republic). In 2003 Konex Foundation from Argentina granted her the Diamond Konex Award, one of the most prestigious awards in Argentina, as the most important Scientific in the last decade in his country.

=== Honorary degrees ===
Roses Periago has been awarded honorary professorships at the Escuela Andaluza de Salud Pública in Granada, Spain; the Universidad Mayor de San Andrés, Bolivia; the Universidad Tecnológica Equinoccial, Ecuador; the Universidad Nacional Autónoma de Nicaragua en León; the Universidad de San Marcos, Peru; and the Universidad Autónoma de Santo Domingo, the Dominican Republic. She has also received honorary doctorates from the Universidad Nacional de Córdoba, Argentina; the Universidad Autónoma Metropolitana, Mexico; the Universidad Nacional Autónoma de Nicaragua en León; the Universidad Peruana Cayetano Heredia, and the Universidad Central del Este, Dominican Republic.
