= Order of Public Health (Bolivia) =

The Order of Public Health is a decoration of Bolivia, given for services beneficial to national health.

It was created by Decree Law 7403 of November 26, 1965, to "reward the eminent and distinguished services of national and foreign professionals in the medical and paramedical fields, whose work has resulted in a better state of health for the community." The Order of Public Health is awarded in several grades: Grand Officer, Commander, Officer, and Knight. The Minister of Health and Sports is the Chancellor of the Order, and the director of the Bolivian National Health Service is the Secretary of the Order.

The medal is a gold coloured piece of metal (it is circular in form for the grade of Grand Officer, and is triangular for the grade of Knight), the medal is suspended from a ribbon composed of national colours.

Recipients include:

Fidel Castro (president of Cuba),

Luis Hurtado Gómez (founder of the Paediatric Society of Bolivia)

Mirta Roses Periago (representative of the OPS/OMS in Bolivia)

Gordon Jonathan Lewis (representative of UNICEF in Bolivia)

Christian Darras (representative of OPS/OMS to Bolivia),

Domenico Bruzzone (representante de la Cooperación Italiana en Bolivia).
