= List of awards and honours received by Fidel Castro =

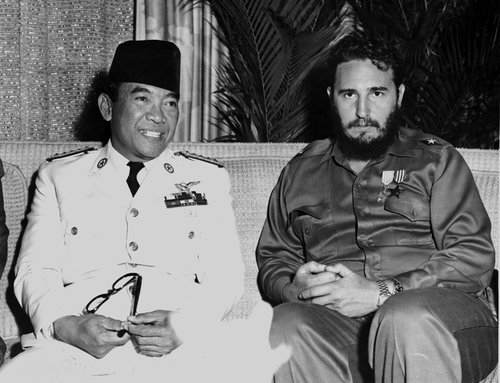
Sukarno and Fidel Castro. The Cuban leader has his two Indonesian decorations.

This is a comprehensive list of awards and honours bestowed upon the Cuban revolutionary and statesman Fidel Alejandro Castro Ruz (except things named after him).

== State decorations ==
Prizes of Cuba, other states, state institutions and subnational entities.

Image	Decoration	Country	Date	Note	Ref.
	Star of the Republic of Indonesia	Indonesia	22 January 1960	Country's highest decoration.	
	Guerrilla Star	Indonesia	22 January 1960		
	International Lenin Peace Prize	USSR	30 April 1961	"For his dedication to the struggle of the peoples for freedom and independence."	
	Hero of the Soviet Union	USSR	23 May 1963	Country's highest decoration. "For their successful struggle for freedom and independence of the heroic Cuban people, who has made his worthy contribution to the great cause of peace and socialism and for his great role in strengthening and development of the fraternal Soviet-Cuban friendship."	
	Order of Lenin	USSR	23 May 1963	Awarded with Hero of the Soviet Union.	
	Jubilee Medal "In Commemoration of the 100th Anniversary of the Birth of Vladimir Ilyich Lenin"	USSR	5 April 1971		
	National Order of Fidelity to People	Guinea	6 May 1972	Country's highest decoration.	
	Order of Georgi Dimitrov	PR Bulgaria	17 May 1972		
	Order of the Star of the Romanian Socialist Republic, First Class	SR Romania	26 May 1972	"For special merits in the revolutionary struggle for national liberation and social development of Cuba, for the defense of national independence and sovereignty of the motherland socialism against imperialism, for the special contribution made to the expansion of multilateral relations of cooperation, international friendship and solidarity between the Communist Party of Cuba and the Romanian Communist Party, between the Republic of Cuba and the Socialist Republic of Romania, between Cuba and the Romanian people."	
	Order of the Flag of the Hungarian People's Republic, First Class	Hungarian People's Republic	31 May 1972		
	Honorary Miner of the Polish People's Republic	Polish People's Republic	7 June 1972		
	Grand Star of People's Friendship	GDR	13 June 1972		
	Collar of the Order of the White Lion	Czechoslovak Socialist Republic	22 June 1972		
	Order of Lenin	USSR	27 June 1972	Awarded by second time.	
	Collar of the Order of Merit	Chile	13 December 1972	Country's highest decoration.	
	Grand Cross of the Order of Polonia Restituta	Polish People's Republic	24 April 1973	Country's highest decoration. For the ideals of Marxism–Leninism, this brotherly friendly and cooperation.	
	Insignia of Fighter of Dien Bien Phu	Vietnam	13 September 1973		
	Jubilee Medal "Thirty Years of Victory in the Great Patriotic War 1941–1945"	USSR	9 May 1975		
	Order of the October Revolution	USSR	13 August 1976		
	Commemorative Medal 20th Anniversary of the Revolutionary Armed Forces	Cuba	25 November 1976	First person awarded.	
	Order of Courage	Libyan Arab Jamahiriya	10 March 1977	Country's highest decoration. First foreigner awarded with this order. "In appreciation of its historic role in confronting imperialism."	
	Order of the Somali Star, First Class	Somali Democratic Republic	14 March 1977	Country's highest decoration.	
	Order of Jamaica	Jamaica	16 October 1977	For "heroic and extraordinary service to his country and all the Third World in the fight against colonialism, imperialism and neocolonialism."	
	Order of Merit	Jamaica		For "heroic and extraordinary service to his country and all the Third World in the fight against colonialism, imperialism and neocolonialism."	
	Grand Order of the Star of Honor of Socialist Ethiopia	Derg	12 September 1978	"In recognition for Fidel's exceptional revolutionary life, firm and intransigent ideological stand on the international plane and the diplomatic and armed and armed struggles."	
	Honorary Citizenship of Addis Ababa	Derg	14 September 1978	Prize of the City Government of Addis Ababa.	
	Seal and Plaque of the 20th Anniversary of the Foundation of the Organs of State Security	Cuba	23 March 1979	Prize of the Organs of State Security.	
	Dimitrov Prize	PR Bulgaria	17 June 1980		
	Gold Star Order	Vietnam	29 July 1982	Country's highest decoration.	
	Commemorative Medal of the 25th Soviet Antarctic Expedition	USSR	10 November 1982		
	Order Augusto César Sandino, grade Battle of San Jacinto	Nicaragua	11 January 1985	Country's highest decoration.	
	Order of Public Health	Bolivia	2 July 1985		
	National Gold Medal	Laos	4 February 1986	Country's highest decoration.	
	Hero of the Democratic People's Republic of Korea	North Korea	9 March 1986	Country's highest decoration.	
	Order of the National Flag, First Class	North Korea	9 March 1986	Awarded with Hero of the Democratic People's Republic of Korea.	
	Order of Karl Marx	GDR	12 August 1986		
	Order of the Yugoslav Great Star	SFR Yugoslavia	14 September 1986	Country's highest decoration.	
	Order of Lenin	USSR	9 November 1988	Awarded by third time for "his contribution to promoting fraternal relations between the USSR and Cuba".	
	Gold Medal of the Senate	Spain	16 January 1988	Prize of the Senate of Spain.	
	Angkor Order	People's Republic of Kampuchea	27 July 1988	Country's highest decoration. For "his contribution to the struggle of the brother Asian country and the fraternal material and moral assistance given to his revolution".	
	Collar of the Mexican Order of the Aztec Eagle	Mexico	1 November 1988	Country's highest decoration. For having always been a friend of Mexico and Latin America and for represent the passionate defense of freedom of peoples and the right to self-determination.	
	Order of Klement Gottwald for Building of Socialist Homeland	Czechoslovak Socialist Republic	5 January 1989	"For outstanding personal merits for the expansion of fraternal and friendly partnership and cooperation between Cuban and Czechoslovak Communist parties, the two countries and their peoples".	
	Order of Ho Chi Minh	Vietnam	8 January 1989		
	Medal Emiliano Zapata	Mexico	17 October 1990	Prize of the State of Morelos.	
	Order of May 17	Cuba	17 May 1992		
	Order of Agostinho Neto	Angola	9 July 1992	Country's highest decoration.	
	Grand Cross of the National Order of Mali	Mali	9 July 1998		
	Grand Cross, Gold Plaque of the Order of Merit of Duarte, Sánchez and Mella	Dominican Republic	22 August 1998	Country's highest decoration.	
	Order of Good Hope, I Grade	South Africa	4 September 1998		
	Companion of the Order of the Star of Ghana, Honorary Division	Ghana	29 September 1998	Country's highest decoration. For being "a champion against oppression and an inspiration for developing nations".	
	Grand Cross, Gold Plaque of the National Order of Honour and Merit	Haiti	9 November 1998	Country's highest decoration.	
	Order of Belize	Belize	8 February 1999		
	Order of Prince Yaroslav the Wise, First Class	Ukraine	19 June 2000	For medical assistance to victims of the Chernobyl disaster.	
	Order of Unity, grade Emblem of the Republic	Yemen	12 September 2000	Country's highest decoration.	
	Collar of the Independence	Qatar	15 September 2000	Country's highest decoration.	
	Grand Collar of the Order of the Liberator	Venezuela	30 October 2000	Country's highest decoration.	
	Medal of the National Liberation Army	Algeria	6 May 2001		
	Most Exalted Order of the Crown of the Realm	Malaysia	11 May 2001		
	Grand Collar of the Order of the Congress of Angostura	Venezuela	11 August 2001	Prize of the Bolívar State. "In recognition of the contributions of the Cuban government to Venezuela on social issues".	
	Medal of the City of Buenos Aires	Argentina	26 May 2003	Prize of the Autonomous City of Buenos Aires. For "being an emblem of the ideals of liberty".	
	Commemorative Medal 50th Anniversary of the July 26th	Cuba	26 July 2003	First person awarded.	
	Labor Hero of the Democratic People's Republic of Korea	North Korea	11 December 2006	For his contribution to "the cause of the Revolution, socialism and justice".	
	Order of the National Flag, First Class	North Korea	11 December 2006	Awarded with Labor Hero of the Democratic People's Republic of Korea.	
	Medal Amílcar Cabral	Guinea-Bissau	29 January 2007	Country's highest decoration. For "having contributed to the establishment and strengthening of Guinea Bissau".	
	Medal to Sports Merit	Ecuador	29 March 2007	Prize of the Ministry of Sports. First person awarded for do much for the sport.	
	Order of the Welwitschia, I Grade	Namibia	21 March 2008	Country's highest decoration. For his support of African liberation struggles.	
	Ubuntu Award	South Africa	17 September 2008	Prize of the National Heritage Council of South Africa. For the role it has played in the Cuban Revolution and its contribution to the fight in the world for an alternative society, fairer.	
	Order of Glory and Honour	Russia Russian Orthodox Church	17 September 2008	For the contribution to the realization of inter-religious dialogues and by reason of the consecration of the Kazan Icon of the Mother of God church in Havana	
	Dominica Award of Honour	Dominica	3 November 2008	Country's highest decoration. For the support provided by Cuba and its leader since independence in Dominica.	
	Grand Extraordinary Cross of Order Omar Torrijos Herrera	Panama	5 January 2009	"For the constant solidarity".	
	Grand Collar of the Order of the Quetzal	Guatemala	16 February 2009	Country's highest decoration. "In appreciation for the more than 17 million consultations and more than 40,000 operations of the Operation Miracle Eye, made by Cuban doctors for the benefit of the Guatemalan people".	
	Supreme Companion of O. R. Tambo	South Africa	27 March 2009	"For his contribution to the eradication of racism, colonialism, apartheid and inequality in human society".	
	Grand Commander of the Order of the Eagle of Zambia	Zambia	22 September 2009	Country's highest decoration. "For his meritorious political, social and economic services to the people of Cuba and other countries".	
	Commemorative Medal of the 50th Anniversary of the Foundation of the Ministry of Foreign Affairs	Cuba	23 December 2009	Prize of the Ministry of Foreign Affairs. Because Castro led with clear and universal thinking, ethics and solid principles, knowledge of the adversary, his undeniable flair for defining the tactical and strategic.	
	Order of Merit, I Grade	Ukraine	27 March 2010	"For his important contribution to restoring the health of the children of Chernobyl, after an accident in 1986 in the Ukrainian Soviet Socialist Republic".	
	General Eloy Alfaro Decoration	Ecuador	26 May 2010	Prize of the National Assembly. For "exceptional merit and dignity".	
	Order of Brave Citizen	Venezuela	14 June 2010	Prize of Barinas Municipality. "For his tangible contribution to defining new paths for the historical, spiritual and material transcendence of humanity through the promotion and unconditional exercise of supreme values of friendship, solidarity, cooperation and internationalism among the peoples of the world".	
	Order Manuela Espejo	Ecuador	21 October 2010	Prize of the Vice Presidency of Ecuador. "In appreciation for the support received in Manuela Espejo Solidarity Mission".	
	Grand Collar of the Order of Timor-Leste	Timor-Leste	3 December 2010	Country's highest decoration. "For Cuban support in health and education".	
	Honorary Citizenship of Diadema	Brazil	2 July 2012	Prize of the Municipality of Diadema.	
	Bangladesh Liberation War Honour	Bangladesh	24 March 2013	"For his contribution to the country's liberation war in 1971".	
	Coat of Arms of the Province	Cuba	15 July 2013	Prize of the Santiago de Cuba Province.	
	Judicial Merit Recognition	Cuba	23 December 2013	Prize of the People's Supreme Court of Cuba. For "his transcendentals contributions to the conception of a humanistic justice".	
	Plaque of the 55th Anniversary of the Foundation of the Organs of State Security	Cuba	25 March 2014	Prize of the Organs of State Security.	
	Honorary Citizenship of Lanús	Argentina	20 August 2014	Prize of the Municipality of Lanús.	
	Sash of the Order of the Republic of Serbia	Serbia	12 May 2015	"For his outstanding contribution to developing and strengthening friendly relations and cooperation between the Republic of Serbia and the Republic of Cuba."	
	Grand Extraordinary Cross, Gold Plaque of the Honor Decoration	Honduras	2 September 2015	Prize of the National Congress. "Recognized the health and education programs Cuba has supplied to the Honduran people and the historical legacy of Fidel Castro".	
	Nishan-e-Pakistan	Pakistan	23 March 2018	For his services to Pakistan.	

== Private awards ==
Decoration	Date	Note	Ref.
"Grand Slam" Silver Trophy - Ernest Hemingway International Billfishing Tournament	May 1960	for catching a sailfish and four marlins	
