= List of awards and honours received by Josip Broz Tito =

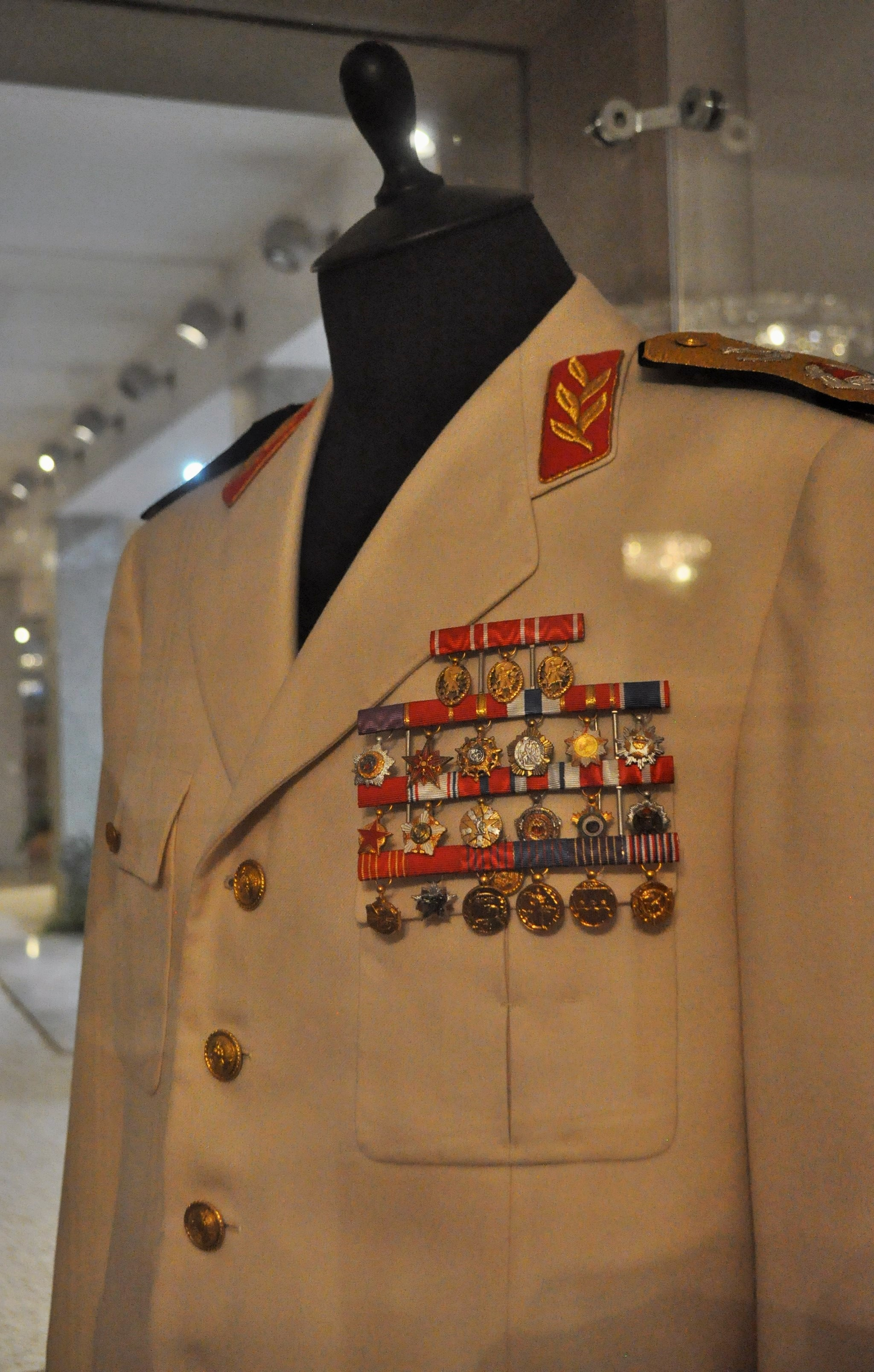
Tito's uniform with all of his Yugoslav decorations

The following is a full list of awards and decorations received by Josip Broz Tito, Yugoslav president and statesman, sorted by continents and Cold War bloc division. Josip Broz Tito received a total of 119 awards and decorations from 60 countries around the world (59 countries and Yugoslavia). 21 decorations were from Yugoslavia itself, 18 having been awarded once, and the Order of the People's Hero on three occasions. Of the 98 international awards and decorations, 92 were received once, and three on two occasions (Order of the White Lion, Polonia Restituta, and Karl Marx). The most notable awards the Soviet Order of Victory, the Japanese Supreme Order of the Chrysanthemum, the German Federal Cross of Merit, and the Italian Ordine al Merito della Repubblica Italiana.

Most were awarded by Poland and Czechoslovakia with six; then France, Indonesia, and the Soviet Union with five each; followed by Romania with four. The decorations were seldom displayed, however. After the Tito-Stalin split of 1948 and his inauguration as president in 1953, Tito rarely wore his uniform except when present in a military function, when meeting with foreign royalty, and then (with rare exception) only wore his Yugoslav ribbons for obvious practical reasons. The awards were displayed in full number only at his funeral in 1980. Tito's reputation as one of the Allied leaders of World War II, along with his diplomatic position as the founder of the Non-Aligned Movement, was primarily the cause of the favorable international recognition.

== Europe ==
=== Western Bloc and neutral countries ===
Award or decoration	Country	Date	Place	Note	Ref
Silver Medal for Bravery 1st Class	Austria-Hungary	1915/1916	Vienna	First medal awarded from Franz Joseph I in 1915 or 1916. Never awarded until 9 February 1965. Yugoslav UDBA take it was hidden.	
Grand Star of the Decoration for Services to the Republic of Austria	Austria	9 February 1965	Vienna	Highest decoration in the Austrian honours system.	
Grand Cordon of the Order of Léopold	Belgium	6 October 1970	Brussels	One of the three Belgian national honorary Knight Orders. Highest Order of Belgium	
Knight of the Elephant	Denmark	29 October 1974	Copenhagen	Highest order of Denmark.	
Commander Grand Cross of the Order of the White Rose of Finland with Collar	Finland	6 May 1963	Belgrade	One of three highest state orders of Finland, established in 1919 by Carl Gustaf Emil Mannerheim.	
Grand cross of the Legion of Honour	France	7 May 1956	Paris	Highest decoration of France, awarded to Tito for extraordinary contributions in the struggle for peace.	
Médaille militaire	France	7 May 1956	Paris	Also received by Winston Churchill, Franklin D. Roosevelt, and Dwight D. Eisenhower.	
Grand cross of the National Order of Merit	France	6 December 1976	Belgrade	Order of Chivalry awarded by the President of the French Republic ("National Order of Merit").	
Croix de guerre with bronze palm	France	7 May 1956	Paris	World War II military decoration of France (War Cross with Bronze Palm).	
Croix du combattant volontaire	France	29 June 1956	Belgrade	French military decoration rewarding soldiers who spontaneously chose to serve with a fighting unit.	
Special class of the Grand Cross of Merit	West Germany	24 June 1974	Bonn	Highest honour of West Germany (and modern Germany).	
Grand Cross of the Order of the Redeemer	Greece	June 1954	Athens	Highest honour of Greece	
Knight Grand Cross with Cordon of the Order of Merit of the Italian Republic	Italy	2 October 1969	Belgrade	Highest honour of Italy, foremost Italian order of knighthood, awarded to Josip Broz Tito in Belgrade.	
Knight of the Order of the Gold Lion of the House of Nassau	Luxembourg	9 October 1970	Luxembourg	Chivalric order, highest honour of Luxembourg.	
Knight Grand Cross of the Order of the Netherlands Lion	Netherlands	20 October 1970	Amsterdam	Second-highest order of the Netherlands, founded by the first King of the Netherlands, William I.	
Grand Cross with Collar of St. Olav	Norway	13 May 1965	Oslo	Highest Norwegian order of chivalry,	
Grand Collar of the Order of Saint James of the Sword	Portugal	17 October 1977	Lisbon	Portuguese order of chivalry, founded in 1171.	
Grand Collar of the Order of Prince Henry	Portugal	23 October 1975	Belgrade	Portuguese National Order of Knighthood.	
Grand Cross of the Order of San Marino	San Marino	25 September 1967	Belgrade	Highest Order of San Marino.	
Knight of the Royal Order of the Seraphim	Sweden	29 February 1959	Stockholm	Swedish Royal order of chivalry, established by King Frederick I on 23 February 1748.	
Knight Grand Cross of the Most Honourable Order of the Bath	United Kingdom	17 October 1972	Belgrade	British order of chivalry, awarded in Belgrade by Queen Elizabeth II.	

=== Eastern Bloc ===
Award or decoration	Country	Date	Place	Note	Ref
Order of People's Liberty 1st Class ^{a}	Bulgaria	25 November 1947	Sofia	Awarded for the participation in the revolutionary struggle of the Bulgarian people.	
Order of the 9 September 1944 1st Class with Swords ^{a}	Bulgaria	25 November 1947	Sofia	Awarded to Bulgarian and foreign citizens who took part in the armed insurrection of 9 September 1944.	
Order of Georgi Dimitrov ^{a}	Bulgaria	22 September 1965	Sofia	Awarded for exceptional merit. Awarded with the title of "People's Hero of Bulgaria".	
Order of the White Lion 1st Class with Collar (awarded two times)	Czechoslovakia	22 March 1946; 26 September 1964	Prague; Brijuni	The highest order of Czechoslovakia.	
Military Order of the White Lion 1st Class	Czechoslovakia	22 March 1946	Prague	Highest military order of Czechoslovakia.	
Order of the Slovak National Uprising 1st Class	Czechoslovakia	22 March 1946	Prague	Military order of the Slovakia (then part of Czechoslovakia).	
Czechoslovak War Cross 1939-1945	Czechoslovakia	22 March 1946	Prague	Military decoration of Czechoslovakia.	
Military Merit Cross 1939-1945	Czechoslovakia	22 March 1946	Prague	Military decoration of Czechoslovakia.	
Order of Karl Marx ^{a} (awarded two times)	East Germany	12 November 1974; 12 January 1977	Berlin; Belgrade	The most prestigious order of East Germany.	
Grand Star of People's Friendship in Gold ^{a}	East Germany	8 June 1965	Berlin	Order of East Germany, awarded for contributions to the preservation of peace.	
Order of Merit of the People's Republic of Hungary, Military Grand Cross	Hungary	7 December 1947	Budapest	Hungarian national order.	
Order of Merit of the People's Republic of Hungary, 1st Class (Civil)	Hungary	7 December 1947	Budapest	Highest Hungarian order of merit.	
Order of the Flag of People's Republic of Hungary 1st Class	Hungary	14 September 1964	Budapest	Hungarian national order.	
War Order Virtuti Militari, I Class	Poland	15 March 1946	Warsaw	Poland's highest war decoration for courage in the face of the enemy.	
Grand Cross of the Order of Polonia Restituta (awarded two times)	Poland	25 June 1964; 4 May 1973	Warsaw; Brdo Castle	Then Poland's highest civilian order for foreigners and Poles.	
Cross of Grunwald 1st Class ^{a}	Poland	19 October 1945	Belgrade	Then Polish highest military decoration.	
Medal of Victory and Freedom 1945	Poland	16 March 1946	Warsaw	Polish military medal. 670,000 of the medals were awarded between 1958 and 1992.	
Partisan Cross	Poland	16 March 1946	Warsaw	Polish Partisan Cross. 55,000 of the medals were awarded.	
Order of Michael the Brave (3rd, 2nd, and 1st Class received)	Romania	19 December 1947	Bucharest	Romania's highest military decoration, instituted by King Ferdinand I.	
Order of the Star of Romania 1st Class	Romania	18 April 1966	Bucharest	Romania's highest civil order.	
Order of the Victory of Socialism ^{a}	Romania	16 May 1972	Drobeta-Turnu Severin	Highest Romanian decoration, awarded with the title of "People's Hero of Romania".	
Order of Lenin ^{a}	Soviet Union	5 June 1972	Moscow	Highest National Order of the Soviet Union.	
Order of the October Revolution ^{a}	Soviet Union	16 August 1977	Moscow	Second highest National Order of the Soviet Union.	
Order of Victory ^{a}	Soviet Union	9 September 1945	Belgrade	Highest military decoration of the Soviet Union, one of only 5 foreigners to receive it.	
Order of Suvorov 1st Class	Soviet Union	September 1944	Moscow	Soviet military decoration, awarded to military personnel for exceptional leadership in combat.	
Twenty Years Of Victory In The Great Patriotic War 1941-1945 Medal ^{a}	Soviet Union	30 June 1965	Moscow	Great Patriotic War jubilee commemorative medal of the Soviet Union.	
Note: ^{a}Now defunct.

=== Yugoslavia ===
Award or decoration	Country	Date	Place	Note	Ref
Order of the Yugoslav Great Star	Yugoslavia	1 February 1954	Belgrade	Highest national order of merit of Yugoslavia.	
Order of Freedom	Yugoslavia	12 June 1945	Belgrade	Highest military decoration of Yugoslavia, and the second highest Yugoslav decoration overall.	
Order of the National Hero (awarded three times)	Yugoslavia	6 November 1944; 15 May 1972; 16 May 1977	Vis; Belgrade; Belgrade	Second highest military award in Yugoslavia, and third highest Yugoslav decoration overall. Josip Broz Tito was the only person to receive it three times.	
Order of the Hero of Socialist Labour	Yugoslavia	29 November 1950	Belgrade	Fourth highest state decoration awarded in Yugoslavia.	
Order of National Liberation	Yugoslavia	15 August 1943	Jajce		
Order of the War Flag	Yugoslavia	29 December 1951	Belgrade		
Order of the Yugoslav Flag with Sash	Yugoslavia	26 November 1947	Belgrade		
Order of the Partisan Star with Golden Wreath	Yugoslavia	15 August 1943	Jajce		
Order of the Republic with Golden Wreath	Yugoslavia	2 July 1960	Belgrade		
Order of Merits for the People	Yugoslavia	9 June 1945	Belgrade		
Order of Brotherhood and Unity with Golden Wreath	Yugoslavia	15 August 1943	Jajce		
Order of the People's Army with Laurel Wreath	Yugoslavia	29 December 1951	Belgrade		
Order of Military Merits with Great Star	Yugoslavia	29 December 1951	Belgrade		
Order of Bravery	Yugoslavia	15 August 1943	Jajce		
Commemorative Medal of the Partisans of 1941	Yugoslavia	14 September 1944	Vis		
30 Years of the Victory over Fascism Medal	Yugoslavia	9 May 1975	Belgrade		
10 Years of the Yugoslav People's Army Medal	Yugoslavia	22 December 1951	Belgrade		
20 Years of the Yugoslav People's Army Medal	Yugoslavia	22 December 1961	Belgrade		
30 Years of the Yugoslav People's Army Medal	Yugoslavia	22 December 1971	Belgrade		
Note: All Yugoslav decorations are now defunct.

== Americas ==
Award or decoration	Country	Date	Place	Note	Ref
Grand Cross of the Order of the Condor of the Andes	Bolivia	29 September 1963	Cochabamba	Bolivian state order.	
Grand Cross of the National Order of the Southern Cross	Brazil	19 September 1963	Brasília	Brazil's highest order of merit.	
Collar of the Order of Merit of Chile	Chile	24 September 1963	Santiago	Chilean order of merit.	
Collar of the Order of the Aztec Eagle	Mexico	30 March 1963	Belgrade	Highest decoration awarded to foreigners by Mexico.	
Medal of Independence	Mexico	15 October 1963	Mexico City	Mexican medal.	
Gold Collar of the Order of Manuel Amador Guerrero	Panama	15 March 1976	Panama City	The highest honour of Panama.	
Collar of the Order of the Liberator	Republic of Venezuela	17 March 1976	Caracas	Highest Venezuelan state order.	

== Asia ==
Award or decoration	Country	Date	Place	Note	Ref
Bangladesh Liberation War Honour	Bangladesh	28 March 2012	Dhaka	Awarded posthumously by the Government of Bangladesh for the support in the Bangladesh Liberation War.	
Grand Collar of the Order of the Supreme Sun with Sash	Afghanistan	1 November 1960	Belgrade	Highest decoration of the Kingdom of Afghanistan.	
Grand Commander of the Most Glorious Order of Truth	Union of Burma	6 January 1955	Rangoon	The highest Burmese commendation (at the time).	
Grand Cross of the Royal Order of Cambodia 1st Class	Cambodia	20 July 1956	Brijuni	Cambodian chivalric order, originally established by France (still in use).	
Grand Collar of National Independence	Cambodia	17 January 1968	Phnom Penh	Cambodian order.	
Star of the Republic of Indonesia 1st Class	Indonesia	16 June 1961	Belgrade	Highest Indonesian order.	
Sacred Star	Indonesia	28 December 1958	Jakarta	Indonesian order, awarded for extraordinary bravery.	
Guerilla Star	Indonesia	28 December 1958	Jakarta	Indonesian medal, crafted from the first exploded shell of the Indonesian National Revolution.	
Order of Bravery	Indonesia	28 December 1958	Jakarta	Indonesian order, awarded for extraordinary bravery.	
Order of the Great Hero	Indonesia	7 April 1960	Brijuni	Indonesian order, awarded for courage in the face of the enemy.	
Commemorative Order 2,500 years of the Iranian Empire ^{a}	Iran	14 October 1971	Persepolis	Iranian order, commemorating 2,500 years of the Iranian Empire.	
Order of the Two Rivers 1st Class with Sash	Iraq	14 August 1967	Belgrade	Contemporary Iraqi state order.	
Military Order of the Two Rivers 1st Class with Sash	Iraq	7 February 1979	Baghdad	Contemporary Iraqi military order.	
Grand Cordon of the Supreme Order of the Chrysanthemum	Japan	8 April 1968	Tokyo	Highest Japanese decoration for living persons.	
Order of al-Hussein bin Ali with Collar and Sash	Jordan	11 February 1979	Amman	Order of Jordan.	
Gold Star Medal of the Hero of the Republic	North Korea	25 August 1977	Pyongyang	DPR Korean order.	
Order of the National Flag 1st Class	North Korea	25 August 1977	Pyongyang	DPR Korean order.	
Collar of the Order of Mubarak the Great	Kuwait	3 February 1979	Kuwait City	Prestigious Kuwaiti decoration.	
Order of Sukhbaatar	Mongolia	20 April 1968	Ulan Bator	A national order of Mongolia.	
Order of the Benevolent Ruler with Collar and Sash	Kingdom of Nepal	2 February 1974	Kathmandu	Highest Nepali state order.	
Order of Pakistan	Pakistan	13 January 1961	Belgrade	Highest Pakistani civil award.	
Grand Cordon of the Order of Oumayyad	Syria	6 February 1974	Damascus	Syrian national order.	
Note: ^{a}Now defunct.

== Africa ==
Award or decoration	Country	Date	Place	Note	Ref
Commemorative Medal for the 50th anniversary of National Independence	Angola	6 November 2025	Luanda	Awarded post-humously, citing his support during the struggle for independence and his contribution to peace and national development.	
Grand Cross of the Order of Merit for Cameroon with Sash	Cameroon	21 June 1967	Brijuni	Highest order of merit of the Republic of Cameroon.	
Grand Cross of the Order of Merit of Central Africa with Sash	CAR	3 May 1972	Belgrade	Highest order of merit of the Central African Republic.	
Order of Merit of the Congo with Sash	Congo	10 September 1975	Belgrade	Highest order of merit in the Congo.	
Grand Cordon of the Order of the Nile with Collar	Egypt	28 December 1955	Cairo	Egypt's highest state honor.	
Grand Collar of the Order of the Queen of Sheba with Sash	Ethiopia	21 July 1954	Belgrade	Ethiopian imperial order.	
Military Medal of Merit of the Order of Saint George with Victory Leaves	Ethiopia	21 July 1954	Belgrade	Imperial military medal of Ethiopia.	
Medal for Defence of the Country with Five Palm Leaves	Ethiopia	21 July 1954	Belgrade	Imperial military medal of Ethiopia.	
Grand Cross of the Order of the Fighter for Independence	Guinea	7 January 1961	Belgrade	Highest Guinean military decoration.	
Grand Collar of the Order of Golden Heart of Kenya 1st Class	Kenya	18 February 1970	Nairobi	Highest Kenyan state order.	
Order of the Pioneers of Liberia	Liberia	13 March 1961	Monrovia	Highest Liberian order.	
Order of the Republic with Sash	Libya	November 1973	Belgrade	Highest Libyan order.	
Grand Cross of the Order of National Merit with Sash	Mauritania	5 September 1968	Brijuni	Highest Mauritanian state honor.	
Grand Collar of the Order of Muhammad	Morocco	1 April 1961	Rabat	Moroccan order.	
National Order of the Lion with Sash	Senegal	30 August 1975	Brdo Castle	Highest Senegalese state honor.	
Order of the Somali Star	Somalia	26 March 1976	Belgrade	Somali state order.	
Grand Collar of the Order of Honor	Sudan	12 February 1959	Khartoum	Sudanese state decoration.	
Grand Cross of the Order of Mono	Togo	23 June 1976	Belgrade	Highest Togolese state honor.	
Grand Cordon of the Order of Independence	Tunisia	9 April 1961	Tunis	Tunisian state order.	
Order of the Great Commander and Distinguished Combatant for Freedom 1st Class	Zambia	8 February 1970	Lusaka	Highest Zambian state order.	

== See also ==
- Yugoslavia and the Non-Aligned Movement
- Marshal of Yugoslavia
