= Nishan-e-Pakistan =

Highest civilian award of the Islamic Republic of Pakistan

Nishan-e-Pakistan نشانِ پاکستان
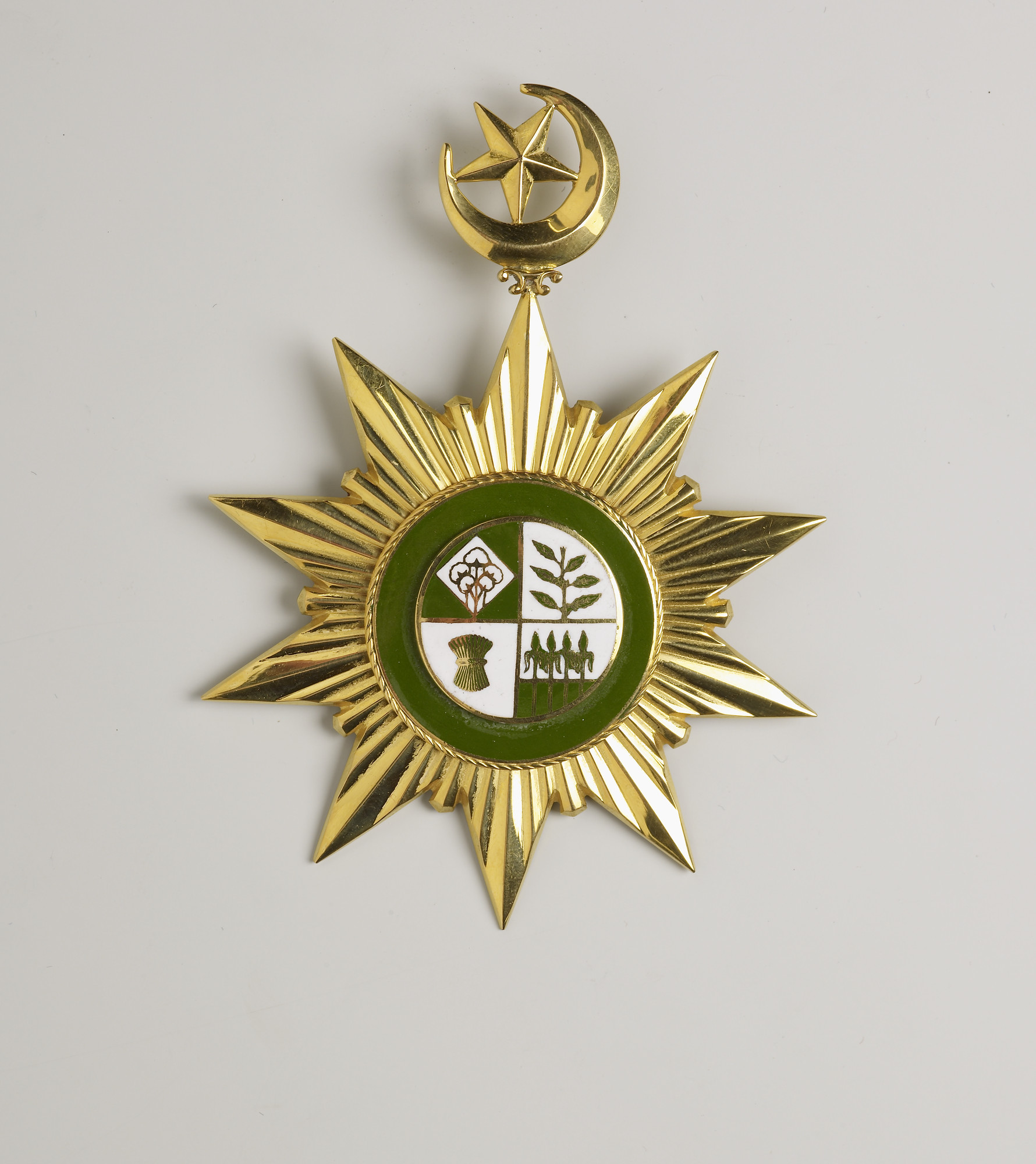
- Nishan-e-Pakistan

Awarded by Government of Pakistan
- Type: National Civilian
- Established: 19 March 1957
- Country: Pakistan
- Eligibility: Heads of State
- Criteria: "rendered services of highest distinction" to the national interest of Pakistan.
- Grades: Grand Crescent; Grand Officer; Commander; Member
- Post-nominals: NPk

Statistics
- First induction: 1959
- Last induction: 2026

Precedence
- Next (higher): None
- Next (lower): Hilal-e-Pakistan
- Service Ribbon of the Nishan-e-Pakistan

Nishan-e-Pakistan (Urdu: نشانِ پاکستان, lit. 'Order of Pakistan') is the highest civilian award of the Islamic Republic of Pakistan. It is awarded to "those who have rendered services of highest distinction" to the national interest of Pakistan. Nishan is awarded to government officials and civilians, including Pakistani citizens and foreign nationals. In the Pakistan honours system, Nishan-e-Pakistan is equivalent to Nishan-e-Haider, the highest military gallantry award. Established on 19 March 1975 under the Decorations Act, 1975, the award is not correlated to the rank or status of a person.

This award, including other civilian awards, is announced on Independence Day (14 August) each year and its investiture takes place on the following Pakistan Resolution Day (23 March) by the president of Pakistan. This award can also be awarded posthumously, and all the recipients are entitled to the post-nominal NPk.

== Grades ==
- Grand Crescent (Nishan)
- Grand Officer (Hilal)
- Commander (Sitara)
- Member (Tamgha)

== Insignia ==
- Collar (Nishan)
- Sash (Nishan)
- Star (Nishan and Hilal)
- Badge (Nishan, Hilal, Sitara and Tamgha)
- Necklet/Bow (Hilal and Sitara)
- Medal (Nishan, Hilal, Sitara and Tamgha)

== Gallery ==
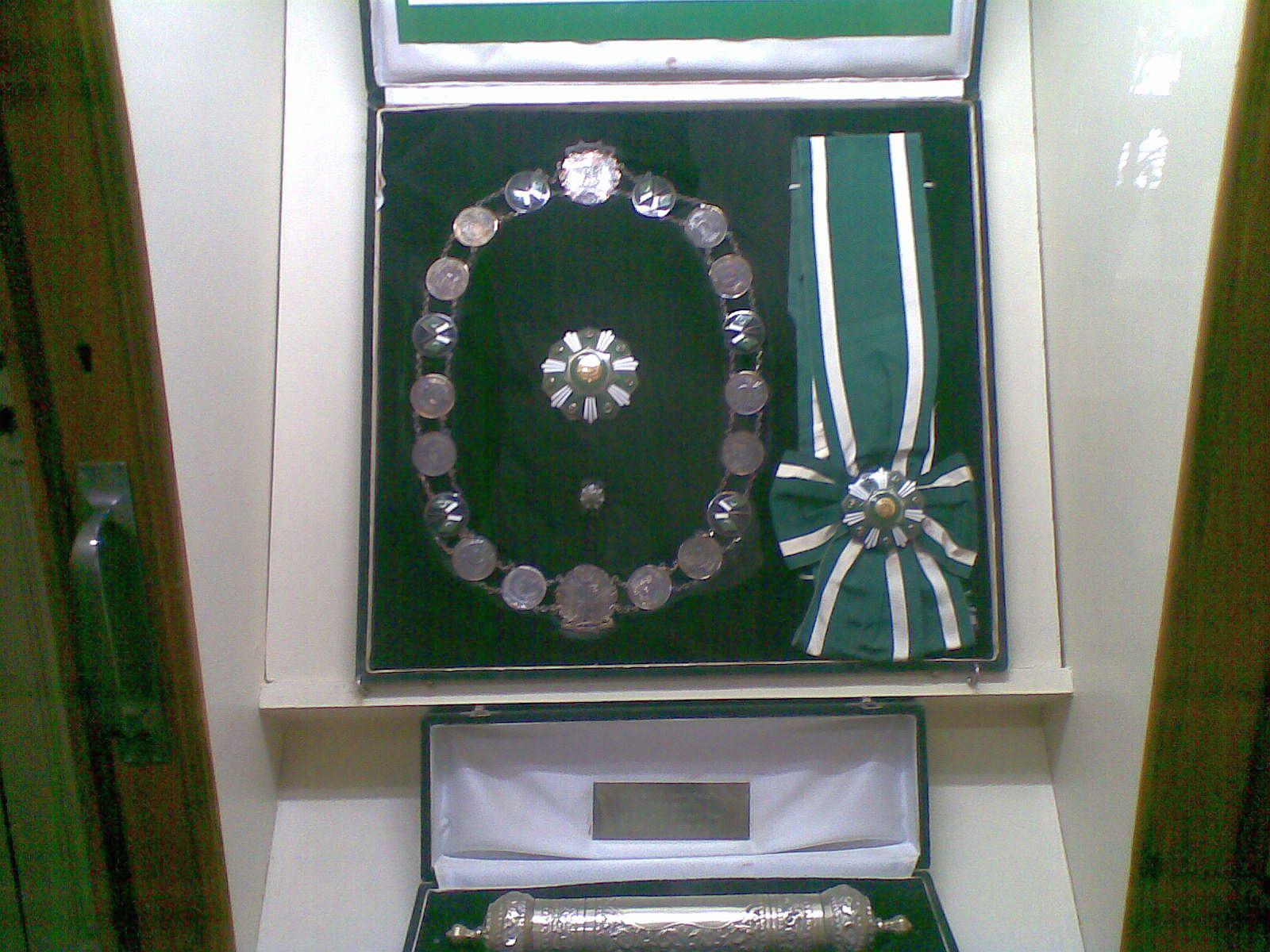
The Nishan-e-Pakistan

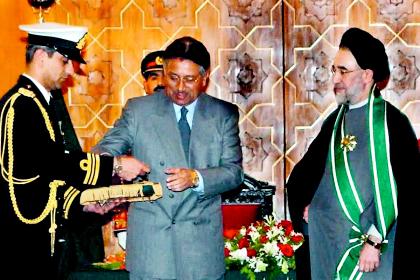
President Musharraf presenting the then Iranian President Mohammad Khatami with the Nishan-e-Pakistan

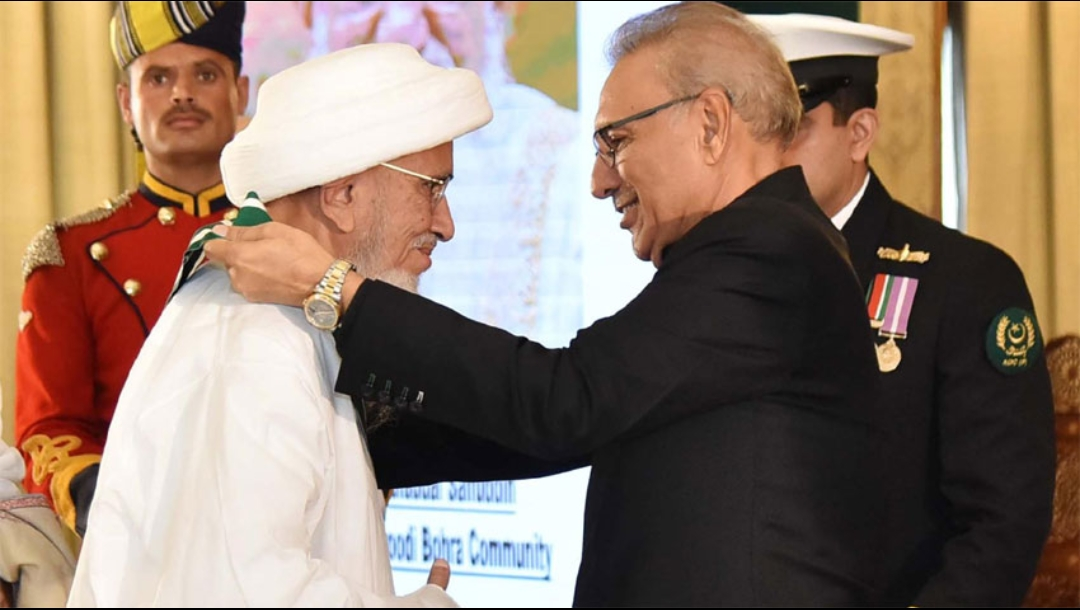
In 2023, President of Pakistan Arif Alvi conferred the Nishan e Pakistan on His Holiness Syedna Mufaddal Saifuddin in a special investiture ceremony in Aiwan e Sadr, Islamabad.

== Recipients ==
Year	Image	Name	Field	Country
1957		Dwight D. Eisenhower	President of the United States	United States
1958		Haile Selassie I	Emperor of Ethiopia	Ethiopia
1959		Mohammad Reza Pahlavi	Shah of Iran	Iran
1960		Hussein	King of Jordan	Jordan
1960		Elizabeth II	Queen of the United Kingdom	United Kingdom
1961		Josip Broz Tito	President of Yugoslavia	Yugoslavia
1962		Bhumibol Adulyadej	King of Thailand	Thailand
1969		Richard Nixon	President of the United States	United States
1982		Suharto	President of Indonesia	Indonesia
1983		Birendra	King of Nepal	Nepal
1983		Aga Khan IV	Leader of Ismaili Muslims	United Kingdom
1990		Morarji Desai	Prime Minister of India	India
1992		Hassanal Bolkiah	Sultan of Brunei	Brunei
1992		Nelson Mandela	President of South Africa	South Africa
1997		Fidel V. Ramos	President of the Philippines	Philippines
1999		Hamad bin Khalifa Al Thani	Emir of Qatar	Qatar
1999		Li Peng	Premier of China	China
2001		Qaboos bin Said	Sultan of Oman	Oman
2002		Mohammad Khatami	President of Iran	Iran
2006		Abdullah	King of Saudi Arabia	Saudi Arabia
2006		Hu Jintao	General Secretary of the Chinese Communist Party; President of China	China
2009		Akihito	Emperor of Japan	Japan
2009		Recep Tayyip Erdoğan	Prime Minister of Turkey	Turkey
2010		Abdullah Gül	President of Turkey	Turkey
2013		Li Keqiang	Premier of China	China
2015		Xi Jinping	General Secretary of the Chinese Communist Party; President of China	China
2018		Fidel Castro	First Secretary of the Communist Party of Cuba; President of Cuba	Cuba
2018		Haris Silajdžić	Bosniak Member of the Presidency of Bosnia and Herzegovina	Bosnia and Herzegovina
2019		Mohammad bin Salman	Crown Prince of Saudi Arabia	Saudi Arabia
2019		Mahathir Mohamad	Prime Minister of Malaysia	Malaysia
2019		Wang Qishan	Vice President of China	China
2019		Tamim bin Hamad Al Thani	Emir of Qatar	Qatar
2020		Daren Sammy	West Indies cricketer	Saint Lucia
2020		Syed Ali Shah Geelani	Hurriyat leader	India
2020		Šefik Džaferović	Chairman of the Presidency of Bosnia and Herzegovina	Bosnia and Herzegovina
2023		Mufaddal Saifuddin	Leader of the Dawoodi Bohras	India
2024		Khalid bin Salman Al Saud	Minister of Defence of Saudi Arabia	Saudi Arabia
2024		Aga Khan V	Leader of Ismaili Muslims	Switzerland
2024		Anwar Ibrahim	Prime Minister of Malaysia	Malaysia
2025		Khaled bin Mohamed bin Zayed Al Nahyan	Crown Prince of Abu Dhabi	United Arab Emirates
2025		Zulfikar Ali Bhutto	Prime Minister of Pakistan	Pakistan
2025		Abdullah II	King of Jordan	Jordan
2025		Prabowo Subianto	President of Indonesia	Indonesia
2026		Kassym-Jomart Tokayev	President of Kazakhstan	Kazakhstan
2026		Shavkat Mirziyoyev	President of Uzbekistan	Uzbekistan

== See also ==
- Nishan-e-Pakistan (Monument)
- Nishan-e-Imtiaz
- Civil decorations of Pakistan
