= List of awards and honours received by Leonid Brezhnev =

The following is a full list of awards and decorations of Leonid Brezhnev, Soviet General Secretary and statesman, sorted into two sections: foreign and domestic.

== Domestic ==
Award or decoration	Date	Awarded for
Hero of the Soviet Union	18 December 1966; 18 December 1976; 19 December 1978; 18 December 1981	"Heroic feats in service to the Soviet state and society." The medals were also awarded on his birthdays.
Hero of Socialist Labour	17 June 1961	"Exceptional achievements in national economy and culture."
Order of Lenin	2 December 1947; 18 December 1956; 17 June 1961; 18 December 1966; 2 October 1971; 18 December 1976; 19 December 1978; 18 December 1981	Outstanding services rendered to the State.
Order of the October Revolution	14 March 1979; 18 December 1980	"Services furthering communism or the state, or in enhancing the defences of the Soviet Union"
Order of the Red Banner	12 March 1942; 29 May 1944	Heroism in combat or other extraordinary accomplishments of military valor during combat operations
Order of Bogdan Khmelnitsky, 2nd class		Exceptional duty in combat operations that led to the liberation of the Soviet territory
Order of the Patriotic War, 1st class		Exceptional duty and courage in the battle for the Soviet Motherland, and soldiers whose actions contributed to the success of military operations
Order of the Red Star		Exceptional service in the cause of the defence of the Soviet Union in both war and peace
Medal for Combat Service		
Jubilee Medal "In Commemoration of the 100th Anniversary since the Birth of Vladimir Il'ich Lenin"		
Medal "For the Defence of Odessa"		For all the participants of the defence of Odessa
Medal "For the Defence of the Caucasus"		For all the participants of the defence of Caucasus
Medal "For the Victory over Germany in the Great Patriotic War 1941–1945"		To all civilian and military personnel in the Soviet army, navy and the NKVD.
Jubilee Medal "Twenty Years of Victory in the Great Patriotic War 1941–1945"		To all civilian and military personnel in the Soviet army, navy and the NKVD.
Jubilee Medal "Thirty Years of Victory in the Great Patriotic War 1941–1945"		To all civilian and military personnel in the Soviet army, navy and the NKVD.
Medal "For the Liberation of Warsaw"		To all civilian and military personnel in the Soviet army, navy and the NKVD who were directly involved in the liberation of Warsaw
Medal "For the Capture of Vienna"		To all civilian and military personnel in the Soviet army, navy and the NKVD who were directly involved in the siege of Vienna
Medal "For Valiant Labour in the Great Patriotic War 1941-1945"		Workers, technicians and employees of industry and transport, farmers and agricultural experts, scientists, artists, authors, officials, party members, trade union members and members of other public organisations who contributed to the Soviet war effort against Germany.
Medal "For Strengthening Military Cooperation"	1979	Contribution to strengthening the military cooperation between various military branches
Medal "For the Restoration of the Black Metallurgy Enterprises of the South"		Workers, technicians and employees of industry and transport, farmers and agricultural experts, scientists, artists, authors, officials, party members, trade union members and members of other public organisations who contributed to the Soviet war effort against Germany.
Medal "For the Development of Virgin Lands"		Collective farmers, workers on state farms, common labourers, Party and state officials, trade union members and Komsomol members for contributions they made during the Virgin Lands Campaign
Jubilee Medal "40 Years of the Armed Forces of the USSR"	1958	Awarded to marshals, generals, admirals, officers and servicemen to celebrate the 40th anniversary of the Soviet armed forces
Jubilee Medal "50 Years of the Armed Forces of the USSR"	1968	Awarded to marshals, generals, admirals, officers and servicemen to celebrate the 50th anniversary of the Soviet armed forces
Jubilee Medal "60 Years of the Armed Forces of the USSR"	1978	Awarded to marshals, generals, admirals, officers and servicemen to celebrate the 60th anniversary of the Soviet armed forces
Medal "In Commemoration of the 250th Anniversary of Leningrad"	1957	Awarded to civilians and armed forces personnel to celebrate the 250th anniversary of the city of Leningrad.
Medal "In Commemoration of the 1500th Anniversary of Kiev"	1982	"his contribution to the socio-cultural and economic development of the Ukrainian capital of Kiev."
Lenin Prize for Literature	1979	for The Small Land, part of a series popularly referred to as Brezhnev's trilogy.
Lenin Peace Prize	1973	
~~Order of Victory~~	20 February 1978 (revoked in 1989)	

Brezhnev's receipt of the Order of Victory was controversial; the award was restricted to commanding officers of high rank who successfully changed the course of the war in favor of the Red Army during World War II. Brezhnev was a young political officer during the war who did reach the rank of lieutenant general, but did not command responsibility close to the other recipients of the Order. He only received the decoration after he was Premier and thus able to essentially award the medal to himself. As a result of the controversy, the Order of Victory was posthumously revoked in 1989.

=== Honorary Citizen ===
- Kyiv: ~~Honorary Citizen of Kyiv~~
- Dnipropetrovsk: ~~Honorary Citizen of Dnipropetrovsk~~

The Kyiv City Council stripped the title (granted in 1982) of "Honorary Citizen of the City of Kyiv" from Brezhnev on 25 May 2023. The Dnipro City Council (Dnipropetrovsk was renamed to its current name Dnipro in 2016) stripped the title (granted in 1979) of "Honorary Citizen of the City of Dnipropetrovsk/Dnipro" from Brezhnev on 20 December 2023. They both stated they did so in accordance with Ukrainian decommunization laws.

== Foreign ==
Award or decoration	Country	Date	Place	Awarded for
Grand Cross of the Order of May	Argentina	1974		
Order of the Sun of Liberty	Afghanistan	1981	Kabul	
Bangladesh Liberation War Honour	Bangladesh	2012	Dhaka	
Hero of the People's Republic of Bulgaria	Bulgaria	1973; 1976; 1981	Sofia	
Order of Georgi Dimitrov	Bulgaria	1973; 1976; 1981	Sofia	
Medal for "100 Years of Liberation from Ottoman Slavery"	Bulgaria	1978		
30th Anniversary Of The Socialist Revolution In Bulgaria	Bulgaria	1974		
90th Anniversary Of The Birth Of Georgi Dimitrov	Bulgaria	1972		
100th Anniversary Of The Birth Of Georgi Dimitrov	Bulgaria	1982		
Hero of the Republic of Cuba	Cuba	1981	Havana	
Order of José Martí	Cuba	1974	Havana	
Order of Carlos Manuel de Céspedes	Cuba	1981	Havana	
Order of Playa Girón	Cuba	1976	Havana	
Medal "20 Years Anniversary of the Moncada Barracks Attack"	Cuba	1973	Havana	
Commemorative Medal "For the 20th Anniversary of the Revolutionary Armed Forces"	Cuba	1976	Havana	
Hero of the Czechoslovak Socialist Republic	Czechoslovakia	5 May 1970; 26 November 1976; 16 December 1981	Prague	"extraordinary merits for the republic connected with a hero achievement or repeated achievements."
Order of Klement Gottwald	Czechoslovakia	1970; 1976; 1978; 1981	Prague	"outstanding merit for realisation of the socialism system in Czechoslovakia."
Order of the White Lion	Czechoslovakia	1946	Prague	"outstanding services to the Czechoslovak Socialist Republic."
Medal "In Commemoration of the Battle of Dukla Pass"	Czechoslovakia	1960		
Military Commemorative Medal	Czechoslovakia	1946		
Czechoslovak War Cross	Czechoslovakia	1945; 1947	Prague	"acts of military valor."
Medal for Bravery Before the Enemy	Czechoslovakia	1945	Prague	"for bravery against the enemy"
Order of the Star of Honor of Socialist Ethiopia	Ethiopia	1980		
Order of the White Rose of Finland	Finland	1976	Helsinki	"civil or military merit."
Hero of the German Democratic Republic	(East Germany) German Democratic Republic	1976; 1979; 1981	East Berlin	"extraordinary achievements and earnings/services the hero acts for the GDR, for their development and all-round stabilization, for which international acknowledgement and authority achieved as well as for its safe military protection."
Order of Karl Marx	(East Germany) German Democratic Republic	1974; 1979; 1981	East Berlin	
Star of People's Friendship	(East Germany) German Democratic Republic	1976	East Berlin	
Order of the Flag of the People's Republic of Hungary	Hungary	1976; 1981	Budapest	
Star of the Republic of Indonesia, 1st class	Indonesia	1961		
National Gold Medal	Laos	1982		
Hero of the Mongolian People's Republic	Mongolia	1976	Ulan Bator	
Hero of Labor of the Mongolian People's Republic	Mongolia	1981		
Order of Sukhbaatar	Mongolia	1966; 1971; 1976; 1981	Ulan Bator	
Medal "30 Years Anniversary of the Victory Over Japan"	Mongolia			
Medal "30 years of the Victory in Khalkhin-Gol"	Mongolia	1969	Ulan Bator	Awarded to participants of the Battles of Khalkhin Gol
Medal "40 Years Anniversary of Khalkhin Gol Victory"	Mongolia			
Medal "50 Years of the Mongolian People's Revolution"	Mongolia	1971	Ulan Bator	Awarded to participants of the Battles of Khalkhin Gol
Medal "50 Years Anniversary of the Mongolian People's Army"	Mongolia			
Order of the National Flag, 1st class	North Korea	1976		
Grand Cross of the Order of the Sun	Peru	1978	Lima	
~~Grand Cross of the Virtuti Militari~~	Poland	21 July 1974 (revoked on 10 July 1990)	Warsaw	
Grand Cross of the Order of Polonia Restituta	Poland	1976	Warsaw	
Cross of Grunwald, 2nd class	Poland	1946	Warsaw	
Medal "For Oder, Neisse and the Baltic"	Poland	1946	Warsaw	"to commemorate the great victory of the Polish soldiers who fought for the new boundaries of the rivers Oder and Nisse and on the Baltic coast, and who saw to the return of Poland's ancient Slavic lands to the west and north, and to congratulate these participants in their struggle."
Medal of Victory and Freedom	Poland	1946	Warsaw	"to commemorate the victory of the Polish Nation and Its Allies above a barbarism of hitlerism, and a triumph of a democratic freedom idea, and to award persons, who helped in this victory and triumph by their acting or suffering in the country or abroad, by May 9, 1945"
Order of the Star of Romania	Romania	1976	Bucharest	
Order of the Victory of Socialism	Romania	1981	Bucharest	
The Medal of the 14th of October	South Yemen	1982		
Gold Star Order	Vietnam	1980		
Hero of Labor	Vietnam	1980		
Order of Ho Chi Minh	Vietnam	1982	Hanoi	"outstanding achievements in one of the areas of politics, economics, literature, arts, science, technology, national defense, security, diplomacy or other fields."
Order of the Yugoslav Great Star	(Socialist Federal Republic of Yugoslavia) Yugoslavia	1962	Belgrade	"development and strengthening of peace and cooperation between nations."
Order of Freedom	(Socialist Federal Republic of Yugoslavia) Yugoslavia	1976	Belgrade	"skillful leadership and outstanding courage."
