= Ernest Hemingway International Billfishing Tournament =

Annual fishing tournament in Cuba

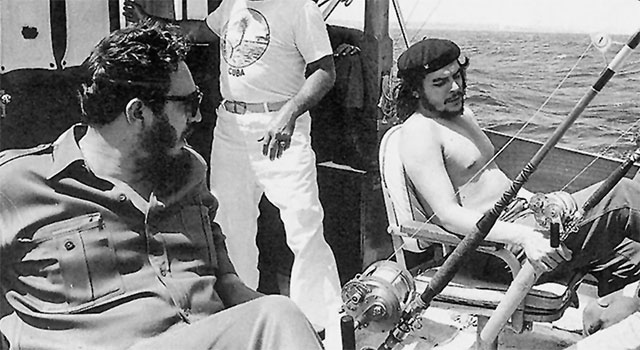
Fidel Castro and Che Guevara participated in the 1960 Hemingway Tournament.

The Ernest Hemingway International Billfishing Tournament is an annual fishing tournament held in Cuba. The tournament was established by American author Ernest Hemingway in 1950. Regularly held in May or June, it has been described as the "highlight of Cuba's fishing year" and regularly attracts anglers from as many as 30 countries.

Hemingway won the first three editions of the tournament. Mina Hemingway, Ernest Hemingway's granddaughter, has twice won the tournament. In 1960, Fidel Castro won the event; Hemingway's presentation of the trophy to Castro marked the only time the two met.

As of 2016, the four-day tournament was sanctioned by the International Game Fish Association. Since 1997 it has been a catch and release tournament. The event is based out of the Hemingway International Yacht Club in Havana.
