= Nishan-e-Pakistan (monument) =

Nishan-e-Pakistan (Urdu: نشانِ پاکستان) is a national solidarity monument in Clifton Beach of the city of Karachi in the Sindh province of Pakistan. It became the second tallest flag pole in Pakistan after a taller flag pole was installed on the Wagha Border on the occasion of Independence Day in 2017.

Nishan-e-Pakistan was inaugurated on Apr 29, 2016 by the Governor of the province of Sindh, Dr. Ishrat ul Ibad Khan, Chief Minister of Sindh Qaim Ali Shah, and Corps Commander Karachi Lt. Gen. Naveed Mukhtar.

== Gallery ==
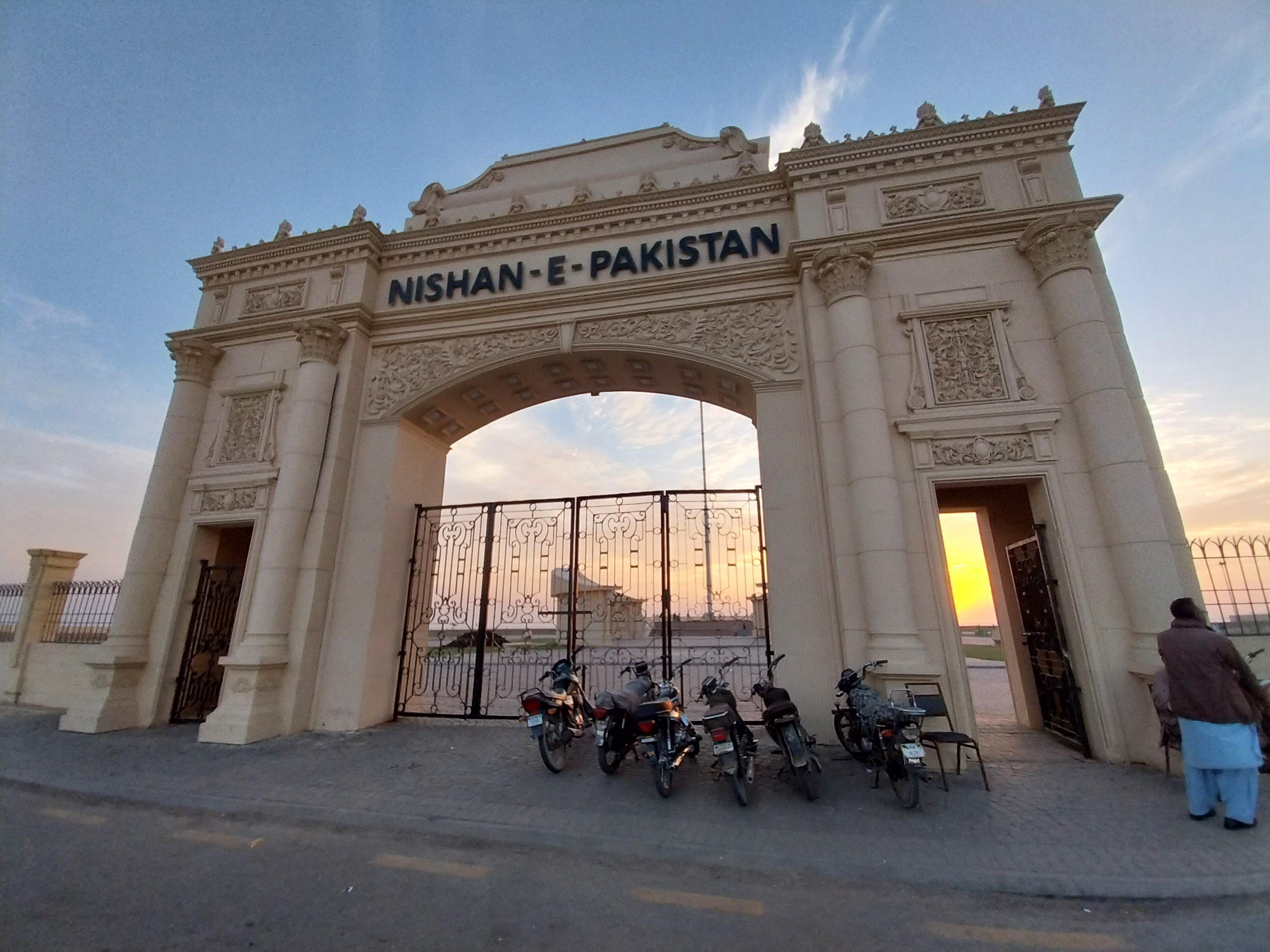
Nishan e Pakistan Monument

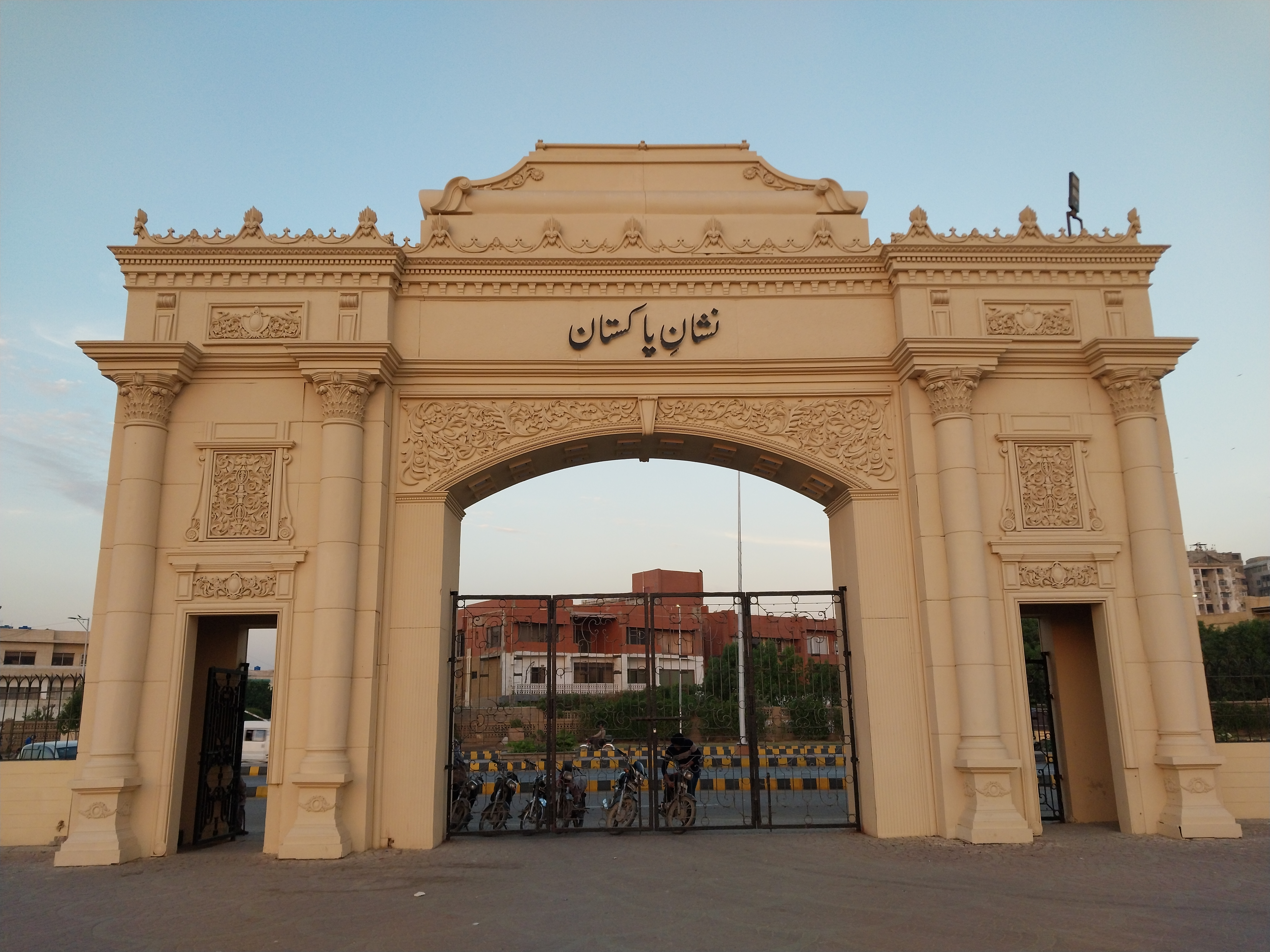
Nishan e Pakistan Monument

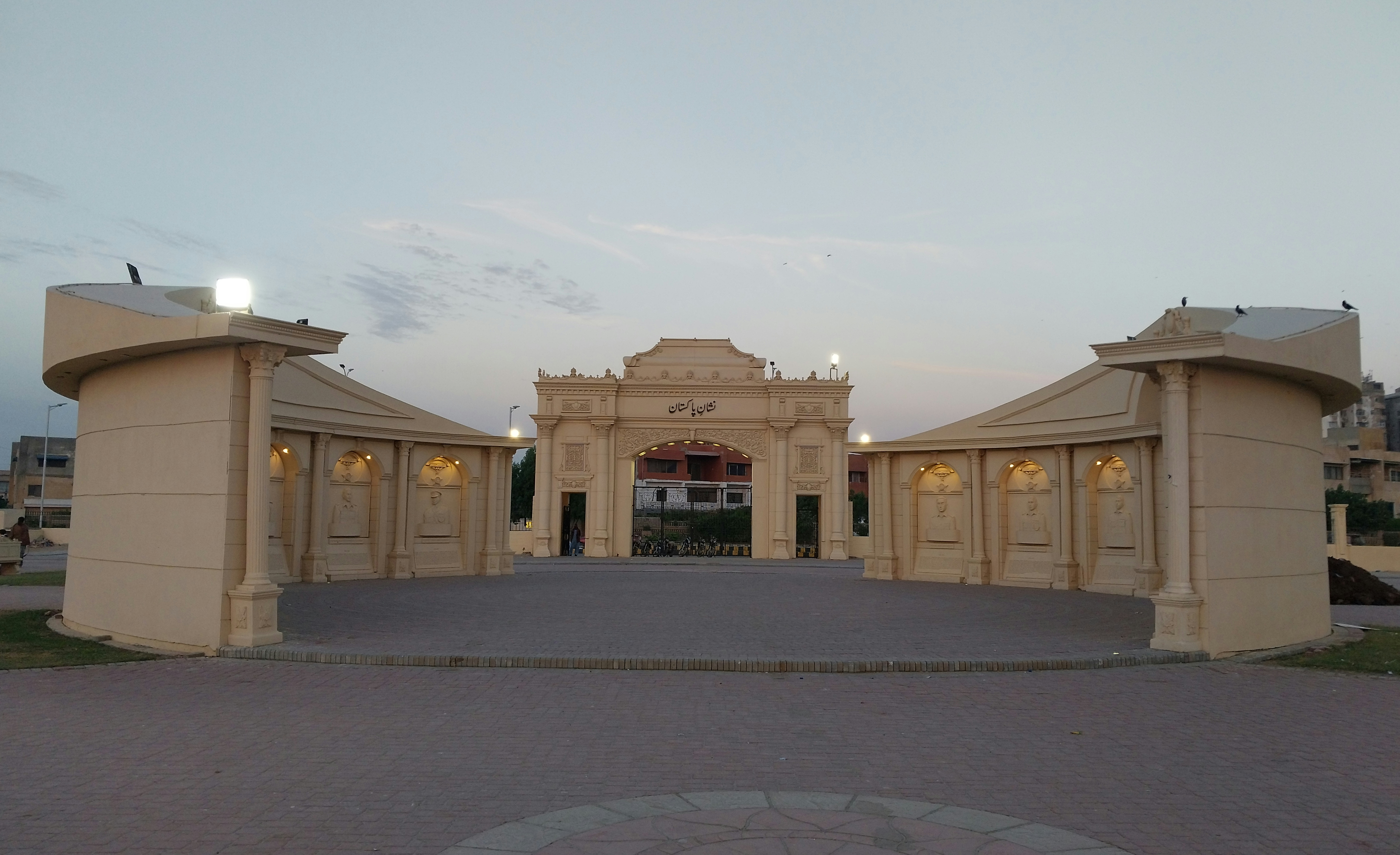
Nishan e Pakistan Monument

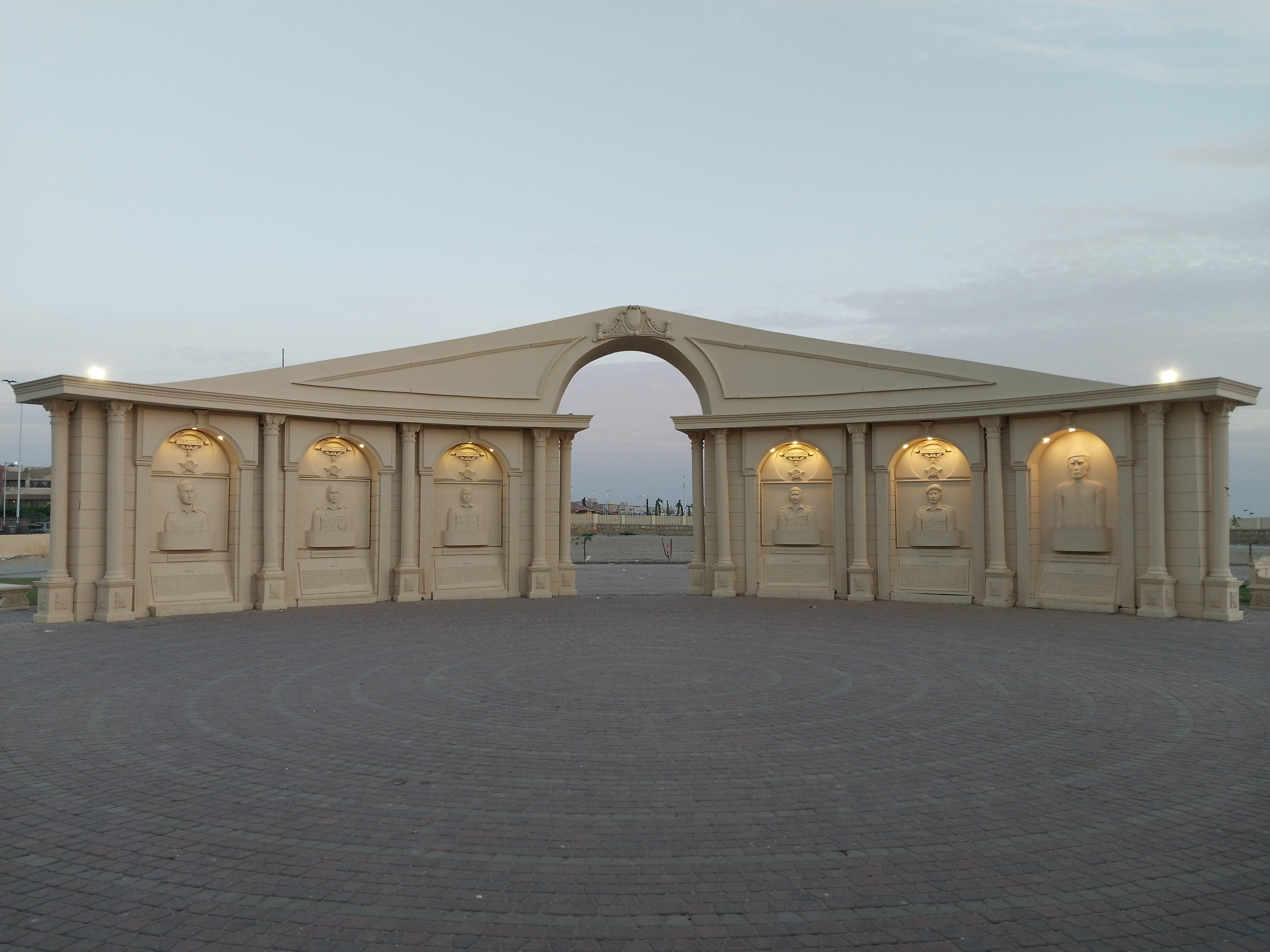
Nishan e Pakistan Monument

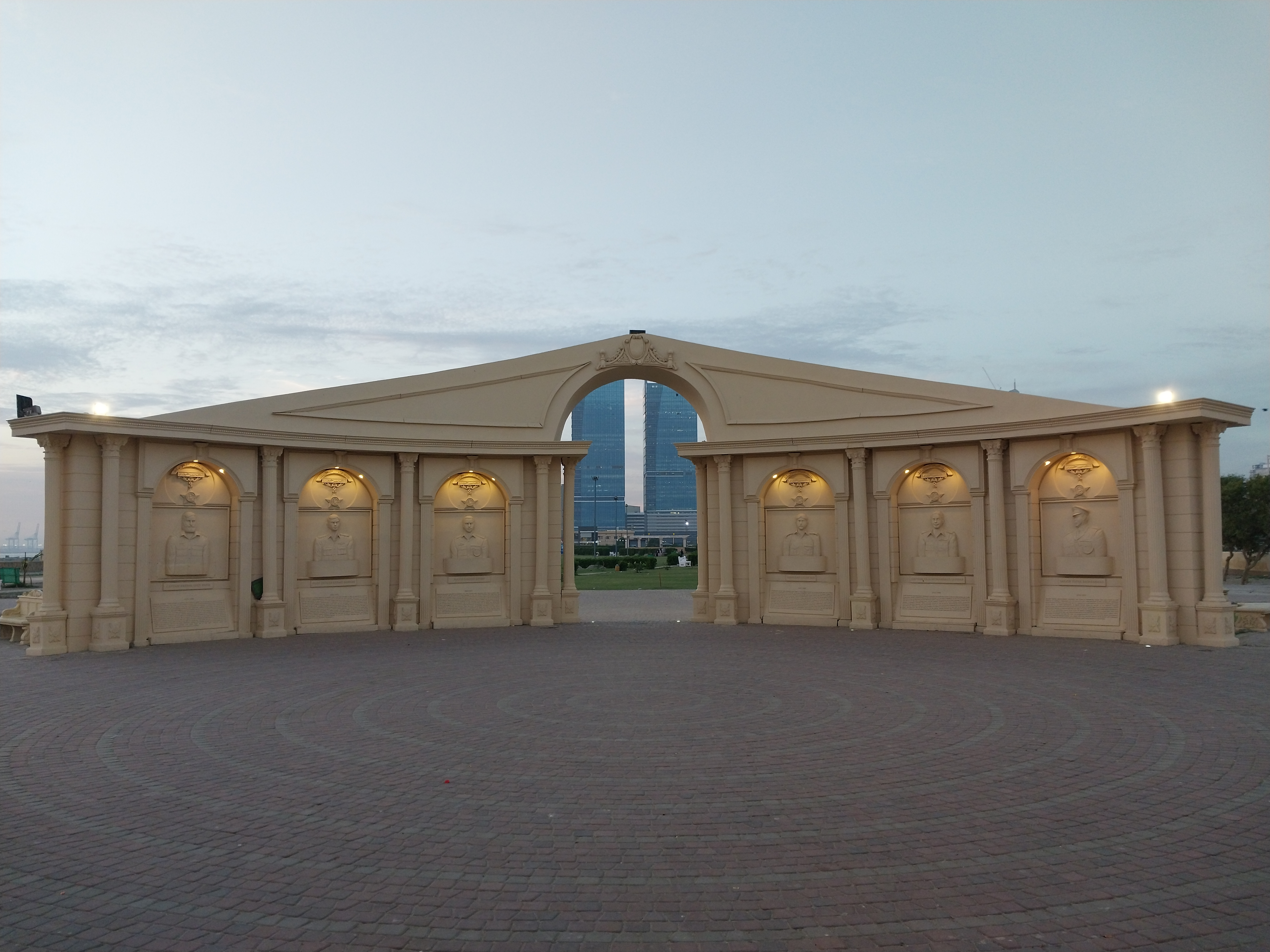
Nishan e Pakistan Monument
