= Commemorative Order "70th Year Anniversary of the Fatherland Liberation War Victory" =

2023 North Korean award

Commemorative Order "70th Year Anniversary of the Fatherland Liberation War Victory" ( 조국해방전쟁승리70돐기념훈장 )
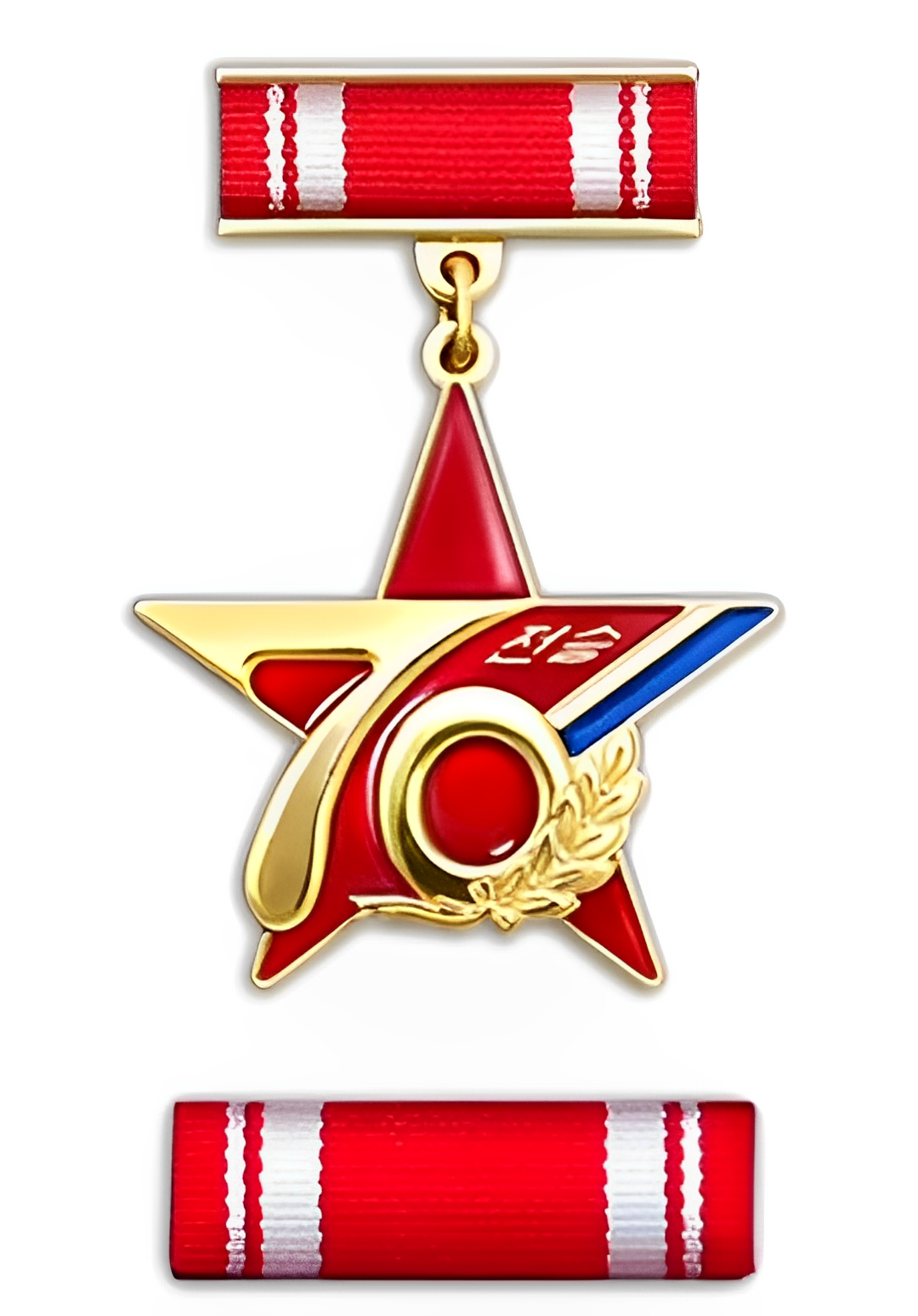
- Commemorative Order "70th Year Anniversary of the Fatherland Liberation War Victory" with the medal and its ribbon
- Awarded for: Participation on the Fatherland Liberation War
- Country: North Korea
- Presented by: The Democratic People's Republic of Korea
- Established: 6 June 2023

The Commemorative Order "70th Year Anniversary of the Fatherland Liberation War Victory" is one of the commemorative orders made by North Korea in commemoration of the 70th Year Anniversary of the Korean Armistice Agreement, known in North Korea as the Fatherland Liberation War Victory.

The order was issued on 6 June 2023 by the Standing Committee of the Supreme People's Assembly.

== Recipients ==
The Commemorative Order was only given to war veterans and persons of wartime merits.

- Kim Il Sung (posthumous)
- Kim Jong Il (posthumous)
- 9,296 War Veterans

== See also ==
- Orders, decorations, and medals of North Korea
