= National Order of Merit (Guinea) =

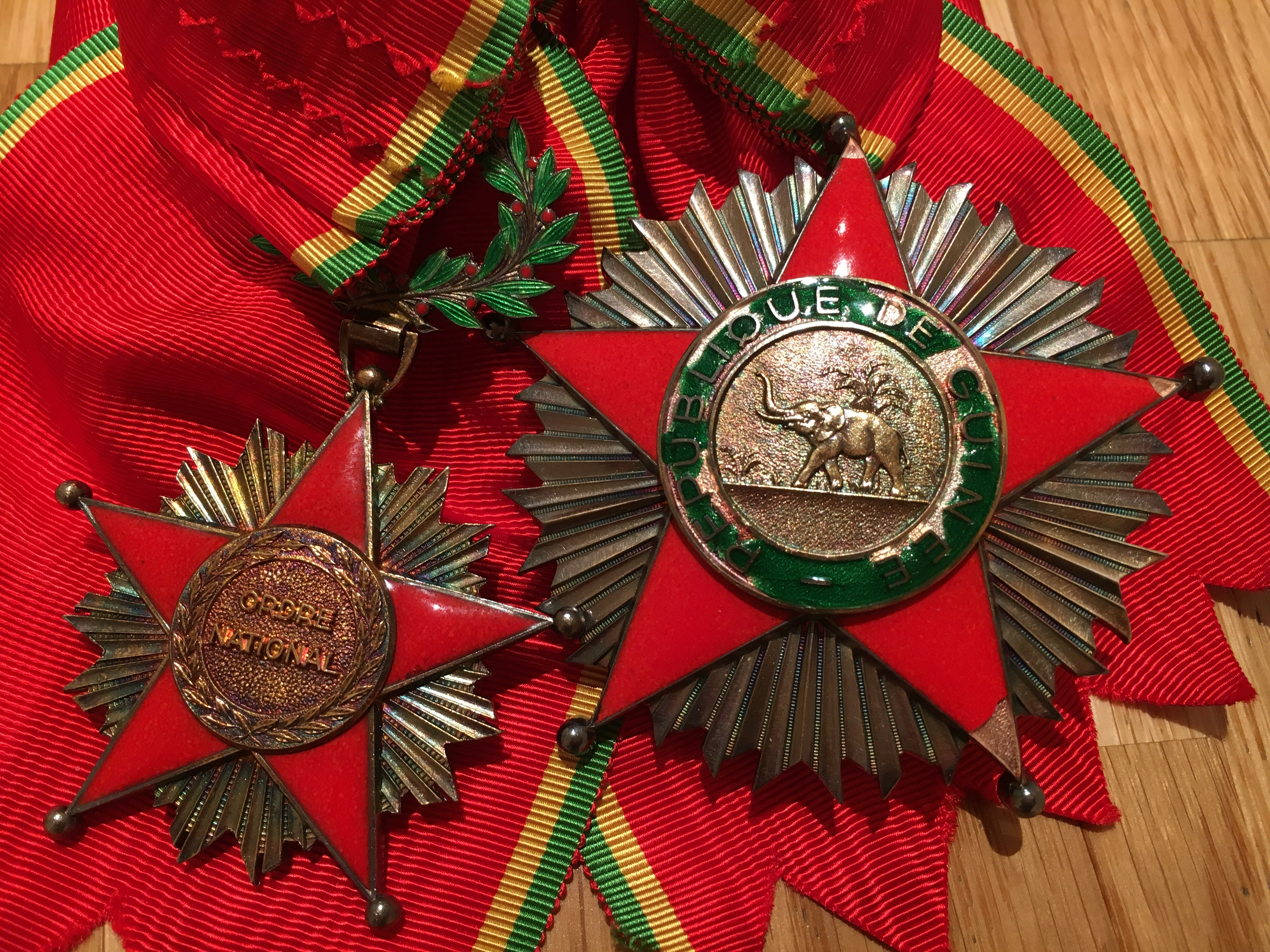
- First type Grand Cross of the Order
- Type: Five-degree Order of Merit
- Presented by: Guinea
- Status: Currently constituted
- Established: 1958
- Ribbon of the order

Precedence
- Next (higher): None
- Next (lower): National Order of the Kola Tree

The National Order of Merit is the pre-eminent state decoration of the Republic of Guinea.

Ribbon bars of the National Order of Merit
Grand Cross	Grand Officer	Commander	Officer	Knight

== Recipients ==
=== Grand Crosses ===
- Agostinho Neto
- Hussein of Jordan
- Valéry Giscard d'Estaing
- Anne-Aymone Giscard d'Estaing
- Seyni Kountché
- Adama Barrow
- Blaise Compaoré
- François Hollande
- Mohammed VI of Morocco
- Abdel Fattah el-Sisi
- Ram Nath Kovind
- Cyril Ramaphosa
- Salman of Saudi Arabia
- Recep Tayyip Erdoğan
- Vladimir Putin
