= Orders, decorations, and medals of Ethiopia =

Awards of Ethiopian government issued for meritorious service

Orders, decorations, and medals of Ethiopia are awards of the government of Ethiopia which are typically issued for sustained meritorious service, whether it be in a civilian capacity or in their capacity in the Ethiopian National Defense Force. They are governed by the laws of Ethiopia on awards.

== Ethiopian Empire (1870–1974) ==
During the socialist era in Ethiopia from 1974 to 1991, after the abolishment of the Empire and the institution of the Derg (later the People's Democratic Republic of Ethiopia), few Imperial Orders or Decorations were issued. During preparations for the return of the Ethiopian monarchy, and upon the death of Emperor Amha Selassie, the Crown Council now gained responsibility over Imperial Orders and Decorations. The following orders comprise all Imperial Honours sanctioned by the Crown Council of Ethiopia:

Civil honours

- Order of Solomon
- Order of the Seal of Solomon
- Order of the Queen of Sheba
- Order of the Holy Trinity
- Order of Menelik II
- Order of the Star of Ethiopia
- Order of Saint Anthony
- Order of Emperor Haile Selassie I
- Order of the Ethiopian Lion

Military decorations

- Military Medal of Merit of the Order of St. George
- Distinguished Military Medal of Haile Selassie the First
- Gold Medal of Menelik II
- Gold Medal of Haile Selassie I
- Silver Medal of Menelik II
- Silver Medal of Haile Selassie I
- Lalibela Cross
- Refugees’ Medal
- Emperor Haile Selassie I & Empress Menen Celebration Medal
- Centenary of the Victory of Adwa Medal
- Medal of Scholarship
- Royal Medal of the Lion
- Purple Heart
- Medal for Defence of the Country

== Derg / People's Democratic Republic of Ethiopia (1974–1991) ==
=== Order of the Grand Star of Honour of Socialist Ethiopia ===
Notable recipients include:

- Fidel Castro (1978)
- Kim Il Sung
- Kim Jong Il
- Leonid Brezhnev (1980)

=== Civil honours ===
- Order of the Revolution of 1966
- Order of the Red Sea
- Order of the Blue Nile
- Order of Africa

=== Military decorations ===
- Victory Star Medal
- Wound Medal
- Civil Service Medal
- Military Service Medal
- Police Service Medal
- Refugee Medal
- Campaign Medal
- UN Medal
- Medal for Military Merit
- Underground Medal

== Federal Democratic Republic of Ethiopia (1995–present) ==
=== Great Honour Nishan of Ethiopia ===
The Great Honour Nishan of Ethiopia is awarded to an individual, group, or organization that has made an outstanding contribution to the nation and the public, particularly through efforts that address challenges in diplomacy, politics, the economy, or the social sector. It may also be conferred upon a country or leader who has provided exceptional support to Ethiopia. Notable recipients includes:

- Narendra Modi (2025)

=== Ethiopia Special Order ===
Notable recipients includes:

- Bill Gates (2025)

=== Military decorations ===
- Wound Medal
- Medal for the Fight Against the Derg
- Military Service Medal
- Medal for Participation in International Peacekeeping Operations
- Medal for Labor Merit
