= Purple Heart (Ethiopia) =

- Type: single-grade order
- Awarded for: Wounded in action
- Presented by: Ethiopia
- Eligibility: Ethiopian and foreign citizens, military units and formations, military schools, and institutions
- Established: 1998
- Ribbon of the medal
- Related: Purple Heart (U.S.)

The Ethiopian Purple Heart is a medal of the Federal Republic of Ethiopia similar to U.S. Purple Heart, which is given to military personnel wounded during a war action.

The medal is heart-shaped; in the center of the heart there are two crossed swords on a red background. Above the heart there is a suspension bar with the inscription "wounded in action" in Amharic language on a green background. The ribbon of the medal is red.
