= Order of the Welwitschia =

National award

Awarded by President of Namibia
- Type: Order
- Established: 17 March 1995
- Status: Currently awarded
- Grand Master: President of Namibia
- Grades: Grand Collar; Grand Commander

Precedence
- Next (higher): None
- Next (lower): Order of the Sun
- Ribbon bar of the order

The Order of the Most Ancient Welwitschia Mirabilis is a state decoration of the Republic of Namibia established in 1995. It is the highest-civilian honour of Namibia.

The order was established on 17 March 1995. It is named after the Welwitschia mirabilis plant, which is endemic to the Namib Desert. The order is awarded to foreign heads of state, it can also be awarded posthumously. The Grand Master of the order is the incumbent President of Namibia.

== Classes ==
The Order of Welwitschia has two Classes:

- Grand Collar
- Grand Commander

== Insignia ==
The badge of the order has the shape of a golden sun composed of rays. In the middle is a round medallion. The badge is attached to the ribbon or chain with a simple ring.

The order star resembles the order badge, but is larger.

The chain is made of gold and consists of 14 links, connected by a double chain. The central element is the colorful enameled coat of arms of Namibia. The other links are in the form of a sun, with a colorful enameled medallion in the middle.

The silk moiré ribbon consists of three stripes in yellow, green, and yellow, separated by narrow white stripes.

== Notable recipients ==
=== Grand Collar ===
- Sam Nujoma, President of Namibia (1995)
- Hage Geingob, President of Namibia (2015)
- Nangolo Mbumba, President of Namibia (2024)

=== Grand Commander ===
- Quett Masire, President of Botswana (1995)
- Kim Jong Il, Supreme Leader of North Korea (2002)
- Fidel Castro, First Secretary of the Communist Party of Cuba (2008)
- Agostinho Neto, President of Angola (2010, posthumous)
- Julius Nyerere, President of Tanzania (2010, posthumous)
- Goodluck Jonathan, President of Nigeria (2014)
- Ellen Johnson Sirleaf, President of Liberia (2018)
- João Lourenço, President of Angola (2018)
- Alpha Condé, President of Guinea (2019)
- Uhuru Kenyatta, President of Kenya (2019)
- Miguel Díaz-Canel, President of Cuba (2023)
- Narendra Modi, Prime Minister of India (2025)
