= National Order of Umayyad =

Highest order of Syria

- Grand Cordon or First class of the National Order of Umayyad

Awarded by Syria
- Type: Order
- Status: Currently constituted
- Grades: Member 1st Class; Member 2nd Class; Member 3rd Class

Precedence
- Next (higher): None
- Next (lower): Hero of the Republic
- Ribbon bar of the order

The National Order of Umayyad (Arabic: وسام أمية الوطني) is the highest order of Syria, named upon the Umayyad Dynasty.

== History ==
The order was established on 12 July 1934 by President Muhammad Ali Bey Al-Abid.

== Classes ==
The order is composed of the following classes :

- Member 1st Class
- Member 2nd Class
- Member 3rd Class

== Insignia ==
- The sash is green with thin black borders and white stripes.

== Recipients ==
- Abdullah of Saudi Arabia
- Al-Waleed bin Talal
- Anwar Sadat
- Elias IV of Antioch
- Juan Domingo Perón
- Émile Lahoud
- Farouk of Egypt
- Francisco Franco
- Giorgio Napolitano
- Haile Selassie
- Hosni Mubarak
- Hugo Chávez
- Hussein of Jordan
- Isa bin Salman Al Khalifa
- Mohammed V of Morocco
- Mohammad Reza Pahlavi
- Mustafa Tlass
- Qaboos bin Said al Said
- Sirajuddin of Perlis
- Suharto
- Siti Hartinah
- Anatoly Bibilov
- Henryk Jabłoński
