= Order of Victory of Socialism =

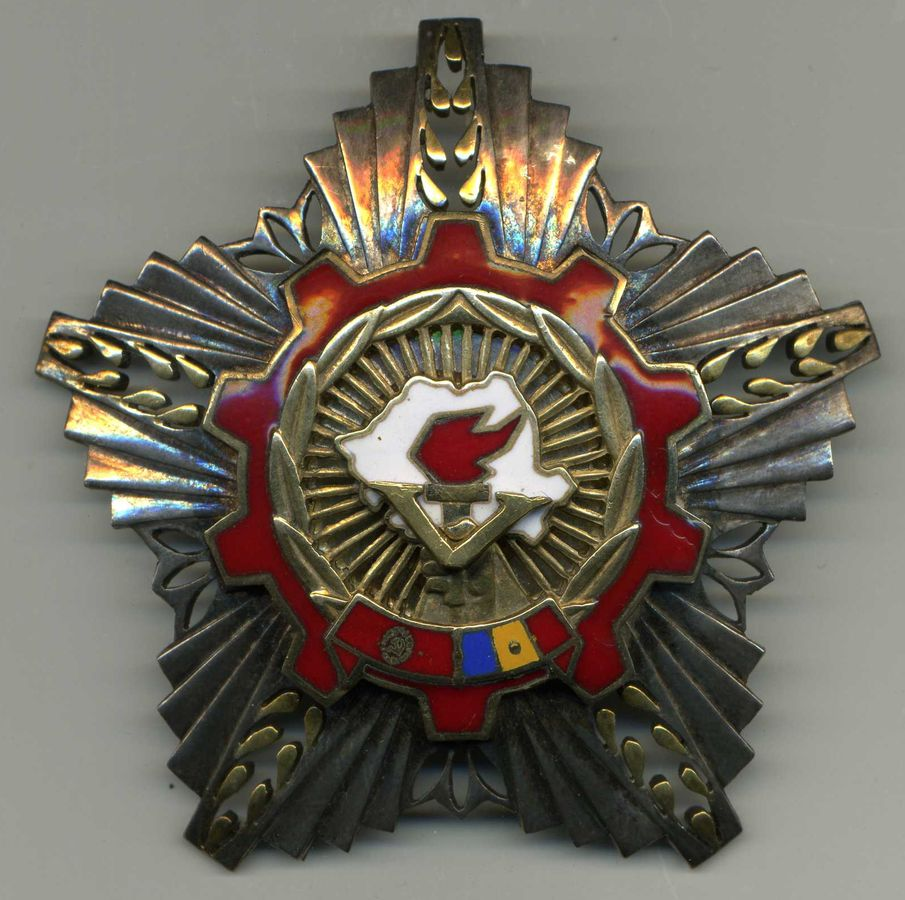
- Gold Star Medal of the Order of Victory of Socialism
- Type: Honorary title
- Awarded for: Service to Romania and Society
- Presented by: the Socialist Republic of Romania
- Eligibility: Romanian and foreign citizens
- First award: 6 May 1971
- Final award: 1989

Precedence
- Next (higher): Order of "August 23"
- Next (lower): Order the "Mother-Heroine"

The Order of Victory of Socialism (Romanian: "Ordinul «Victoria» Socialismului") was the highest distinction in the Socialist Republic of Romania. This socialist order had no knights but rather several degrees. The 2nd degree was decorated with diamonds and gave the owner the right to bear the title of Hero of the Socialist Republic of Romania.

== Description ==
It consists of a five-pointed partially enamelled star of silver and bronze. The rays of the star are decorated with gilded points. The center of the star is decorated by a red or orange enamel wreath with teeth on the inside and a laurel wreath. The two flags below are those of the Communist Party of Romania and the Romanian tricolour. Inside the wreath is a medallion with a map of Romania, a burning torch and the letter V for "Victoria" (Victory).

== List of recipients ==
- (Socialist Republic of Romania) Nicolae Ceaușescu (1971, 1978 and 1988)
- (Socialist Federal Republic of Yugoslavia) Josip Broz Tito (1972)
- (Socialist Republic of Romania) Zaharia Stancu (1972)
- (Spain) Dolores Ibárruri (1975)
- (Soviet Union) Leonid Brezhnev (1981)
- (East Germany) Erich Honecker (1987)
- (Czechoslovakia) Gustáv Husák (1988)
- (North Korea) Kim Il Sung (1987)
