= List of awards and honours received by Muammar Gaddafi =

This is a comprehensive list of awards, honours and other recognitions bestowed on Muammar Gaddafi.

== National honours ==
Award or decoration	Country	Date	Place	Note	Ref
Order of the Republic	Libya	1 September 1969			
Order of Courage	Libya	1 September 1969		Military order, awarded to members of the armed forces active during and following the 1 September Revolution.	
Order of the Grand Conqueror	Libya	1 September 1969			

== Foreign honours ==
Award or decoration	Country	Date	Place	Note	Ref
Honorary Member of the Xirka Ġieħ ir-Repubblika	Malta	5 December 1975	Valletta	Former highest decoration of the Republic of Malta, now second highest honour. Revoked.	
Order of the Balkan Mountains	Bulgaria	17 June 1978	Sofia	Bulgarian highest order of merit.	
Grand Star of Peoples' Friendship	East Germany	26 June 1978			
Grand Cordon of the Order of Merit of the People's Republic of Poland	Poland	June 1978	Warsaw		
Collar of the Order of the White Lion	Czechoslovakia	1982	Prague	Czechoslovak highest order.	
Hero of the Republic	North Korea	1982	Pyongyang	Second highest title of North Korea.	
Order of the National Flag, First Class	North Korea	1982	Pyongyang	Second highest order of North Korea.	
Grand Commander of the Order of the Federal Republic	Nigeria	11 May 1997	Abuja	Nigerian highest honour.	
Grand Cross of the Order of Good Hope	South Africa	29 October 1997	Tripoli	Former South African highest order.	
Great Chain of Badr	Saudi Arabia	3 June 1999	Sirte	Highest honour of Saudi Arabia.	
Great Star of the Order of the Yugoslav Star	Yugoslavia	18 November 1973	Belgrade	Highest order of merit in the Socialist Federal Republic of Yugoslavia.	
Great Star of the Order of the Yugoslav Star	Yugoslavia	26 October 1999	Tripoli	Second highest order of merit in the Federal Republic of Yugoslavia. Only person to be awarded this decoration twice.	
Collar of the Order of Prince Yaroslav the Wise	Ukraine	11 October 2003		Ukrainian third highest order.	
Collar of the National Order of Merit	Malta	8 February 2004		Republic of Malta highest order. Revoked.	
Order of Katonga	Uganda	20 May 2004	Tripoli	Ugandan highest military order.	
Order of Bohdan Khmelnytsky	Ukraine	4 April 2008			
Grand Commander of the Order of the Republic of the Gambia	Gambia	22 July 2009	Banjul	Gambian highest decoration.	
Grand Collar of the Order of the Liberator	Venezuela	28 September 2009	Isla Margarita	Former Venezuelan highest distinction.	

== Honorary degrees ==
- Sudan: University of Khartoum Honorary doctorate, 1996 (revoked on 7 March 2011).
- South Korea: Myongji University Honorary doctorate, 29 March 2000.
- Algeria: University of Algiers Honorary doctorate, 27 March 2005.
- Serbia: Megatrend University Honorary doctorate, March 2007.
- Tunisia: Carthage University-National Institute of Applied Science and Technology Honorary doctorate in Arabic and Islamic Civilisation, 12 October 2008.
- Belarus: Belarusian State University of Informatics and Radioelectronics Honorary doctorate, 2010.

== Eponyms ==
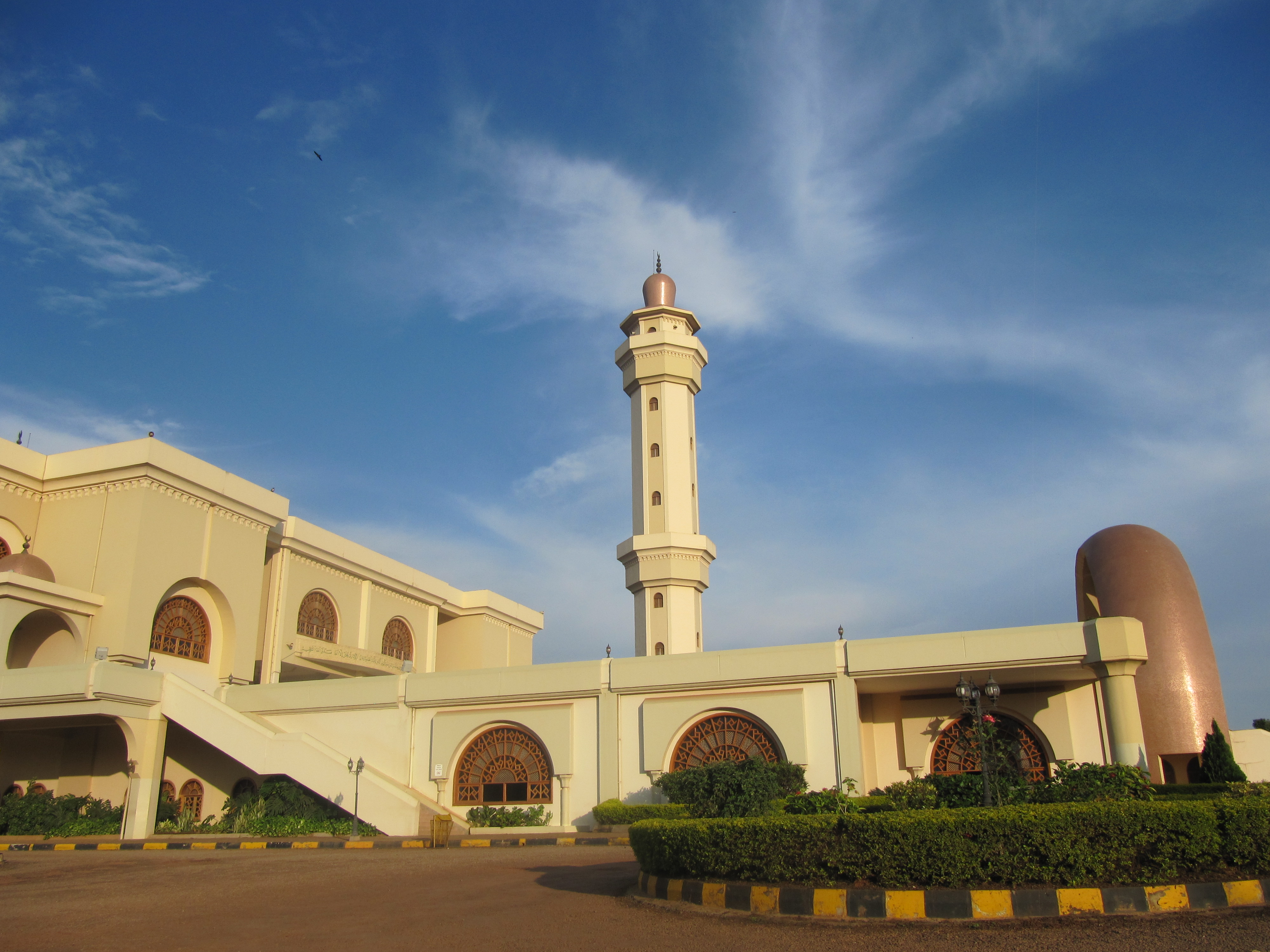
Gaddafi National Mosque in Kampala, Uganda.

- Gaddafi National Mosque, the biggest mosque in Kampala, Uganda.
- Gaddafi Mosque, in Dodoma, Tanzania.
- Gaddafi Mosque, in Freetown, Sierra Leone.
- Gaddafi Mosque, in Kigali, Rwanda.
- Gaddafi Barracks, an Ugandan Army military base in Jinja, Uganda.
- Gaddafi Stadium, the fourth largest cricket stadium in Pakistan, situated in Lahore. The complex also has a mosque and a bus station named after Gaddafi.
- Gaddafi Hockey Stadium, the biggest field hockey stadium in the world, located in Lahore, Pakistan.
- Gaddafi Soccer Stadium, a soccer stadium in Lahore, Pakistan.
- Gaddafi International Foundation for Charity Associations, an international NGO.
- Gaddafi Gardens, a garden in Paola, Malta (renamed Mediterranean Garden in 2016).
- Muammar Gaddafi Playground, a children's playground along the Miljacka river in Stari Grad, Sarajevo, Bosnia and Hercegovina.

== Other honours ==
- In December 2007, Gaddafi was awarded the Golden Key to the City of Madrid by then-Mayor Alberto Ruiz-Gallardón.
- In August 2008, an assembly of African monarchs and chieftains bestowed Gaddafi with the title "King of Kings" of Africa.
