= National Gold Medal =

- Vector of the National Gold Medal
- Type: single grade order
- Awarded for: President of Laos, native Laotians and foreigners
- Presented by: Laos
- Status: Active
- Established: 1981
- First award: 1981, (Vietnam) Lê Duẩn
- Ribbon of the National Gold Medal

National Gold Medal (Lao: ຫລຽນຄຳແຫ່ງຊາດ, liankham aehngsad) is the highest award of Lao People's Democratic Republic. This honor was created in 1981 by the first Laotian president Souphanouvong. The honour was awarded to the President of Laos and others.

The National Gold Medal was first awarded in 1981 to a former leader of Communist Party of Vietnam, Lê Duẩn, during an official state visit. In 1989, Souphanouvong was awarded this medal on the occasion of his 80th birthday. Other notable recipients include Kim Il-sung, Hun Sen, Fidel Castro, Leonid Brezhnev, Nguyễn Phú Trọng and Princess Maha Chakri Sirindhorn.

== Design ==
The round breast medal is mostly gold, measuring 37mm across with hero style suspension and a 22mm wide red ribbon. The obverse is a sharp pointed gold star, surmounting a gold disk with a cogwheel with rice sheaves around. The name of the award, ຫລຽນຄຳແຫ່ງຊາດ (lian kam haeng-saaht) is written below the star.

== Notable recipients ==
- (Vietnam) : Lê Duẩn
- (Vietnam) : Nguyễn Phú Trọng
- (Vietnam) : Tô Lâm
- (Bulgaria) : Todor Zhivkov
- (North Korea) : Kim Il-sung
- (Cuba) : Fidel Castro
- (Soviet Union) : Leonid Brezhnev
- (Cambodia) : Hun Sen
- (Thailand) : Princess Maha Chakri Sirindhorn
- (Brunei) : Sultan Hassanal Bolkiah
