= Order of the National Flag =

Second highest order of North Korea

- Country: North Korea
- Presented by: the Democratic People's Republic of Korea
- Eligibility: Individuals and organizations, for political, cultural or economic work, recipients of the Hero of the Republic, Hero of Labour, Order of Freedom and Independence and Order of Soldier's Honor in the appropriate class and various "People's" honorary titles
- Status: Active
- Established: 12 October 1948

Highlights
- Total: 1st Class 100,000+ 2nd Class 200,000+ 3rd Class 1,100,000+

Precedence
- Next (higher): Order of Kim Il Sung, Order of Kim Jong Il
- Next (lower): Order of Freedom and Independence
- Related: Hero of the Republic, Hero of Labour

- Order of the National Flag
- Hangul: 국기훈장
- Hanja: 國旗勳章
- RR: Gukgi hunjang
- MR: Kukki hunjang

The Order of the National Flag (Korean: 국기훈장) is the second highest order of North Korea, after the Order of Kim Il Sung and the Order of Kim Jong Il.

It is the oldest order in the country, having been established in 1948, just six weeks after the North Korean state was founded.

The order is awarded to both individuals and organizations, for political, cultural or economic work. The order, which comes in three classes, is automatically conferred upon recipients of the titles of Hero of the Republic and Hero of Labour and various "People's" honorary titles. The Order of the National Flag is also awarded to recipients of the Order of Freedom and Independence and Order of Soldier's Honor in the appropriate class. Recipients are entitled to benefits such as a salary or free public transport.

Domestic recipients include both leaders Kim Il Sung and Kim Jong Il and other notables. Foreign recipients include politicians such as Fidel Castro, Hosni Mubarak and Siad Barre.

== History ==
When the order was instituted on 12 October 1948, six weeks after the foundation of the North Korean state, it was the first and highest order of the country. It is named after the flag of North Korea.

== Eligibility ==
It can be awarded to individuals and to organizations or workplaces for achievements in military service or political, cultural, or economic work. It is also awarded to officers of the Workers' Party of Korea for longstanding service (25 years for the first class, 20 years for the second class and 15 years for the third class).

Those who are awarded the title of Hero of the Republic or Hero of Labour are always awarded with the Order of the National Flag as well, as are laureates of "People's" honorary titles. Recipients of the Order of Freedom and Independence receive the Order of the National Flag of the same class, but Order of Soldier's Honor recipients receive the Order of the National Flag in a lower class. Recipients have the right to use public transport free of charge. Disabled and retired recipients receive an annual salary along with the order.

== Precedence ==
The Order of the National Flag is the second highest order of North Korea, after the Order of Kim Il Sung and the Order of Kim Jong Il, which share the first place. The order has three classes.

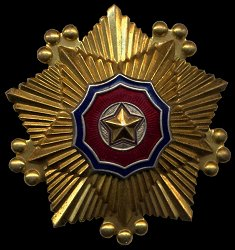
1st class

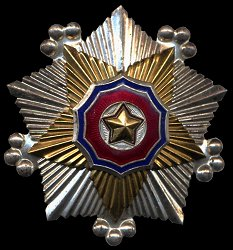
2nd class

3rd class

== Recipients ==
=== North Korean recipients ===
- Kim Il Sung (6 February 1951, first class; 28 July 1953, first class)
- Han Sorya (26 April 1951, second class)
- Im Hwa (26 April 1951, second class)
- Cho Ki-chon (26 April 1951, second class)
- Ri Ki-yong (26 April 1951, second class)
- Yi T'aejun (26 April 1951, second class)
- Kim Chogyu (26 April 1951, third class)
- Pak Unggŏl (26 April 1951, third class)
- Shin Kosong (26 April 1951, third class)
- Pak Chong-ae (July 1953, second class; first class)
- Thae Byong-ryol
- Jang Chol (August 1961, first class)
- Ri Tu-il (June 1968, first class)
- Kim Ryong-yong (January 1976, first class)
- Choe Sam Suk (1982, first class)
- Kim Jong Il (1982, first class)
- Jong Chang-ryol (June 1986, first class)
- Kim Su-jo (October 1989, first class)
- Paek Hak-rim (April 1997, first class)
- Ri Ul-sol (April 1997, first class)
- O Ik-je (September 1997, first class)
- Jon Pyong-ho (February 1998, first class)
- Ryu Mi-yong (January 1991, first class)
- Pak Hun, (December 10, 2018, first class)
- Han Duk-su (first class ten times)
- Hyon Yong-chol (eight times first class, five times second class, and twice third class)
- Kim Ryong Rin (nine times first class)
- Jo Myong-rok (first class)
- Kim Jung-rin (first class)
- Kim Rak-hui (first class)
- Lee Kwon-mu (first class)
- Ri Jong-ok (first class)
- Kang Ki-sop (two times first class, three times second class, and three times third class)
- At the beginning of 2010, North Korean media announced that the Order of the National Flag, first class, was posthumously awarded to the captain and first mechanics of the freighter that sunk in November 2009 by the Chinese city of Dalian. The crew attempted to salvage the ship's portraits of Kim Il Sung and Kim Jong Il.
- Pyongyang University of Music and Dance (first class)
- Kigwancha Sports Club (first class)
- Chongnyon Jonwi (first class)
- 5th generator turbine of Sup'ung Dam (first class)
- Hwasong-17's transporter erector launcher number 321 (first class, awarded in November 2022)

=== Foreign recipients ===
- Peng Dehuai (China, 1951 and 1953, first class)
- Antonín Zápotocký (Czechoslovakia, 1955, first class)
- Alois Barvínek (Czechoslovakia, 1955, third class), Czechoslovak composer
- Nureddin al-Atassi (Syria, September 1969, first class)
- Siad Barre (Democratic Republic of Somalia, 1972, first class)
- Gustáv Husák (Czechoslovakia, first class, awarded twice 1973 and 1988)
- Gnassingbé Eyadéma (Togo, September 1974, first class)
- Didier Ratsiraka (Madagascar, 1978, first class)
- Samora Machel (Mozambique, March 1975, first class)
- Ferdinand Kozovski (Bulgarian Lieutenant general of Bulgarian army, deputy komander of Bulgarian army 1944-1945 in Second World War, Chairman of National assembly of Bulgaria 1958-1965)
- Leonid Brezhnev (Soviet Union, 18 December 1976, first class)
- Juvénal Habyarimana (Rwanda, 1978, first class)
- Jean-Bédel Bokassa (Central African Empire, 1978, first class)
- Choi Eun-hee (South Korea, 1983, first class)
- Hosni Mubarak (Egypt, 1983, first class)
- Agatha Barbara (Malta, August 1985, first class)
- Sam Nujoma (Namibia, 1992)
- Norodom Sihanouk (Cambodia, 1965, first class)
- Fidel Castro (Cuba, 2006, first class)
- Józef Borowiec, former director of the National Center of Education in Płakowice, Poland
- Yakov Novichenko (Soviet Union)
- Alejandro Cao de Benós (Spain)
- Ra Hun, Korean minority activist in Japan (first class, second class, and twice third class)
- Megawati Sukarnoputri (Indonesia, 2002, first class)
- Wojciech Jaruzelski (Poland, 1977, first class)
- Heinz Kessler (East Germany, July 1988, first class)
- Josip Broz Tito (Yugoslavia, 25 August 1977, first class)
- Olavi Linnus (Finland, 1978, second class)
- Saleh Harsi Awad Al-Ban (South Yemen, 1969, third class)
- Forbes Burnham (Guyana, 1972, first class)
- Vajiralongkorn (Thailand, 1992, first class)

== See also ==
- Flag of North Korea
- Orders and medals of North Korea
