= Orders, decorations, and medals of North Korea =

The award system of the Democratic People's Republic of Korea (North Korea) was initially created less than one month after the foundation of the Republic. During the years of Japanese occupation of Korea, many of the future leaders fled to the Soviet Union. During World War II many if not close to all party leaders and Korean People's Army commanders served in the Soviet Army and as such adopted many of the Soviet awards criteria for their own. During the late 1940s and until the Sino-Soviet Split in late 1958, orders and titles were made in the Soviet Money Mints in Moscow or Leningrad. Soviet made awards were modeled after Soviet orders and made of sterling silver. Initially the orders were attached to clothing with a screw-plate, but after Soviet production stopped, production was moved to North Korea. The screwback was replaced with a pin and the silver content was replaced with cheap tin. With the exception of a few examples of modern orders, Soviet and Czech KPA awards are the most sought after in current militaria markets.

== Titles ==
Award	Name (English/Korean/Transliteration)	Date created	Description
	Hero of the Republic 공화국영웅; Konghwaguk Yŏng'ung	1950-06-30	The "Hero of the Republic" was the highest award of the Democratic People's Republic of Korea until the Order of Kim Il Sung was established in 1972. Awarded for extreme heroic exploits during the Korean War and thereafter. The recipient is also awarded with the Order of the National Flag 1st Class which was the nation's highest order until the Order of Kim Il Sung. Along with the Gold Star and order the recipient is also honoured with the erection of a personal statue at their birthplace. This award is based upon the Soviet award "Hero of the Soviet Union".
	Hero of Labour 로력영웅; Roryŏk Yŏng'ung	1951-07-17	This title was the highest civilian award until the establishment of the Order of Kim Il Sung in 1972. Awarded for exceptional merit and efficiency in professional labour. The recipient of this title was also awarded the Order of the National Flag 1st Class which was also the nation's highest order until the Order of Kim Il Sung. This award is based upon the Soviet award "Hero of Socialist Labour".

== Orders ==
Order and Ribbon	Name (English/Korean/Transliteration)	Date created	Description
	Order of Kim Il Sung 김일성 훈장; Kim Ilsŏng Hunjang	1972-03-20	The Order of Kim Il Sung is the highest decoration of the country. It is awarded for contributions to the revolution or upholding the dignity of the country at home or abroad. It is usually awarded around April 15 (Day of the Sun, the birthday of Kim Il Sung). Kim Jong Il was its first recipient, although he rejected the order first.
	Order of Kim Jong Il 김정일 훈장; Kim Chŏngil Hunjang	2012-02-03	With the issuance of Decree 2150 by the Presidium of the Supreme People's Assembly on 3 February 2012, the Order of Kim Jong Il was created for the 70th anniversary of his birth. The order measures 67 mm in length and 65 mm in width. It features the portrait of Kim Jong Il in the centre of golden ears of rice above a shining five-point star, the flag of the DPRK below and the emblem of the Workers' Party of Korea above with an engraving of "Order of Kim Jong-il" on the back with pin and serial number. It is made to give commendation to officials, service personnel, working people, military units, organs, enterprises, and organizations who provided distinguished service to the DPRK. The order ribbon is similar to the Order of Kim Il Sung in colour and the star at the centre, but its design is different.
	Order of the National Flag; 1st Class 국기훈장 제1급; Kukki Hunjang; Che il-gŭp	1948-10-02	Until the creation of the Order of Kim Il Sung in 1972, the highest order of the Democratic People's Republic of Korea. The ONF was based on the awarding criteria of the Soviet Order of the Badge of Honour. Awards were present to those that exemplified themselves in the fields of science, economics, and teachings of socialist ideologies.
	Order of the National Flag; 2nd Class 국기훈장 제2급; Kukki Hunjang; Che i-gŭp	1948-10-02	Order ribbon has 2 gold stripes indicating 2nd Class.
	Order of the National Flag; 3rd Class 국기훈장 제3급; Kukki Hunjang; Che sam-gŭp	1948-10-02	Order ribbon has 3 small gold stripes indicating 3rd Class.
	Order of Korean Labour 조선로력훈장; Chosŏn Roryŏk Hunjang	1951-07-17	For efficient and meritorious professional labour. Notable recipients: Catherine Denguiadé, empress of the Central African Empire.; King Gyanendra Bir Bikram Shah Dev of Nepal; Konrad Püschel, East German architect and town planner, for his work rebuilding the cities of Hamhung and Hungnam.; Kang Ki-sop, Director of the Korean General Administration of Civil Aviation.
	Soldier's Medal of Honour; 1st Class 전사영예훈장 제1급; Chŏnsa Yŏng'ye Hunjang; Che il-gŭp	1950-07-01	For acts of individual gallantry in combat. The insignia design is similar to the Soviet Union Order of the Red Star (soldier on central crest encircled with wreaths) and Order of the Patriotic War (Red enamel five-pointed star, made of gold/silver, with straight rays in the background, and crossed sabre and a rifle) combined.
	Soldier's Medal of Honour; 2nd Class 전사영예훈장 제2급; Chŏnsa Yŏng'ye Hunjang; Che i-gŭp	1950-07-01	For acts of individual gallantry in combat. The insignia design is similar to the Soviet Union Order of the Red Star (soldier on central crest encircled with wreaths) and Order of the Patriotic War (Red enamel five-pointed star, made of gold/silver, with straight rays in the background, and crossed sabre and a rifle) combined.
	Order of Admiral Yi Sun-Shin; 1st Class 이순신장군훈장 제1급; I Sunsin Changgun Hunjang; Che il-gŭp	1950-07-13	Conferred upon flag officers and navy commanders for outstanding leadership. The 1st class is never issued and the order is discontinued. Believed to be based on the Soviet Union equivalent Order of Ushakov or Order of Nakhimov.
	Order of Admiral Yi Sun-Shin; 2nd Class 이순신장군훈장 제2급; I Sunsin Changgun Hunjang; Che i-gŭp	1950-07-13	Conferred upon flag officers and navy commanders for outstanding leadership. The 1st class is never issued and the order is discontinued. Believed to be based on the Soviet Union equivalent Order of Ushakov or Order of Nakhimov.
	Order of Freedom and Independence; 1st Class 자유독립훈장 제1급; Sayu Tongnip Hunjang; Che il-gŭp	1951-07-17	The original screwplate or pin back awards were given to Division, Corp or Army field commanders for achievement in battle. The medal was awarded to commanders in both the KPA and the PLA. During the reign of Kim Jong Il, the award became a necktie style, has lost its battlefield prestige and given for reason more political than military. Awarded to Regiment or lower formation commanders for skill in battle.
	Order of Freedom and Independence; 2nd Class 자유독립훈장 제2급; Sayu Tongnip Hunjang; Che i-gŭp	1951-07-17	The original screwplate or pin back awards were given to Division, Corp or Army field commanders for achievement in battle. The medal was awarded to commanders in both the KPA and the PLA. During the reign of Kim Jong Il, the award became a necktie style, has lost its battlefield prestige and given for reason more political than military. Awarded to Regiment or lower formation commanders for skill in battle.
	Order of Military Service Honour; 1st Class 군사복무영예훈장 제1급; Kunsa Pongmu Yŏng'ye Hunjang; Che il-gŭp	1973-07-03	Awarded for meritorious achievement and distinguished service to higher ranks of the armed forces.
	Order of Military Service Honour; 2nd Class 군사복무영예훈장 제2급; Kunsa Pongmu Yŏng'ye Hunjang; Che i-gŭp	1973-07-03	Awarded for meritorious achievement and distinguished service to higher ranks of the armed forces.
	Order of Military Service Honour; 3rd Class 군사복무영예훈장 제3급; Kunsa Pongmu Yŏng'ye Hunjang; Che sam-gŭp	1973-07-03	Awarded for meritorious achievement and distinguished service to higher ranks of the armed forces.
	Order of Colliery Service Honour; 1st Class 석탄광업복무영예훈장 제1급; Sŏkt'an Kwang'ŏp Pongmu Yŏng'ye Hunjang; Che il-gŭp	1973-09-03	Awarded to mine workers for long service or especial achievements in productivity.
	Order of Colliery Service Honour; 2nd Class 석탄광업복무영예훈장 제2급; Sŏkt'an Kwang'ŏp Pongmu Yŏng'ye Hunjang; Che i-gŭp	1973-09-03	Awarded to mine workers for long service or especial achievements in productivity.
	Order of Colliery Service Honour; 3rd Class 석탄광업복무영예훈장 제3급; Sŏkt'an Kwang'ŏp Pongmu Yŏng'ye Hunjang; Che sam-gŭp	1973-09-03	Awarded to mine workers for long service or especial achievements in productivity.
	Order of Military Engineering Service Honour; 10 Years 군수공복무영예훈장; 10; Kunsugong Pongmu Yŏng'ye Hunjang sip		Awarded to veteran military engineers, enlisted, NCOs and officers in the KPA for 10 years service in military engineering service
	Order of Military Engineering Service Honour; 20 Years 군수공복무영예훈장; 20; Kunsugong Pongmu Yŏng'ye Hunjang isip		Awarded to veteran military engineers, enlisted, NCOs and officers in the KPA for 20 years service in military engineering service
	Order of Military Engineering Service Honour; 30 Years 군수공복무영예훈장; 30; Kunsugong Pongmu Yŏng'ye Hunjang samsip		Awarded to veteran military engineers, enlisted, NCOs and officers in the KPA for 30 years service in military engineering service
	Order of Fishery Service Honour; 1st Class 수산복무영예훈장 제1급; Susan Pongmu Yŏng'ye Hunjang; Che il-gŭp	1986	Awarded for merit recognition within the fishery sector.
	Order of Fishery Service Honour; 2nd Class 수산복무영예훈장 제2급; Susan Pongmu Yŏng'ye Hunjang; Che i-gŭp	1986	Awarded for merit recognition within the fishery sector.
	Order of Railway Service Honour; 1st Class 철도복무영예훈장 제1급; Ch'ŏldo Pongmu Yŏng'ye Hunjang; Che il-gŭp	1988-10-6	Awarded for merit and service recognition within the railway industry.
	Order of Railway Service Honour; 2nd Class 철도복무영예훈장 제2급; Ch'ŏldo Pongmu Yŏng'ye Hunjang; Che i-gŭp	1988-10-6	Awarded for merit and service recognition within the railway industry.
	Order of Railway Service Honour; 3rd Class 철도복무영예훈장 제3급; Ch'ŏldo Pongmu Yŏng'ye Hunjang; Che sam-gŭp	1988-10-6	Awarded for merit and service recognition within the railway industry.
	Order of Democratic People's Republic of Korea Friendship; 1st Class 조선민주주의인민공화국친선훈장 제1급; Chosŏn Minjujuŭi Inmin Konghwaguk Ch'insŏn Hunjang; Che il-gŭp	1985-07-25	Awarded to foreign Dignitaries, Specialists, and diplomats who performed distinguished service or meritorious achievements in strengthening their countries friendship with North Korea. Awarded only to non-nationals. Including; Antonio Inoki (Japan) in 2010-09
	Order of Democratic People's Republic of Korea Friendship; 2nd Class 조선민주주의인민공화국친선훈장 제2급; Chosŏn Minjujuŭi Inmin Konghwaguk Ch'insŏn Hunjang; Che i-gŭp	1985-07-25	Awarded to foreign Dignitaries, Specialists, and diplomats who performed distinguished service or meritorious achievements in strengthening their countries friendship with North Korea. Awarded only to non-nationals. Including; Alejandro Cao de Benos (Spain); Norbert Vollertsen (Germany) in 1999; Ellsworth Culver (United States) on 2006-01-10; Liu Xiaoming (China) on 2010-02-03.
	Order of the Red Banner of Three Great Revolutions; 3대혁명붉은기훈장; Sam Tae Hyŏngmyŏng Pulg'ŭngi Hunjang	1986-11-20	Awarded for distinguished service or achievement in the fields of ideology, technology and culture.
	Order of Teacher's Honor; 1st Class	2008-04-10	Awarded to teachers who have devotedly worked to implement Kim Il Sung's Theses on Socialist Education
	Order of Teacher's Honor; 2nd Class	2008-04-10	Awarded to teachers who have devotedly worked to implement Kim Il Sung's Theses on Socialist Education
	Order of Teacher's Honor; 3rd Class	2008-04-10	Awarded to teachers who have devotedly worked to implement Kim Il Sung's Theses on Socialist Education
	Order of Kunjari Working Class	2016-04-07	Awarded to munitions industry officials and workers who have distinguished themselves in the Kunjari Working Class mass campaign

=== Commemorative orders ===
Order And Ribbon	Name (English/Korean/Transliteration)	Date created	Description
	Commemorative Order "Anniversary of the Foundation of the People's Army" 조선인민군창건기념훈장; Chosŏn Inmin'gun Ch'anggŏn Kinyŏm Hunjang	1968-01-25	This order was originally dated 1968.2.8 for the 20th anniversary and also a screw-back (the only screw-back commemorative order), later variations are pin back and undated for the 40th and 50th anniversaries. This order could be awarded to an individual up to three times, especially if he/she is a veteran or retired officer or NCO of the KPA in recognition of services given to the country.
	Commemorative Order "20th Anniversary of the Foundation of the Democratic People's Republic of Korea" 조선민주주의인민공화국창건20주년기념훈장; Chosŏn Minjujuŭi Inmin Konghwaguk Ch'anggŏn Isip Chunyŏn Ginyŏm Hunjang	1968-05-24	This order was awarded only once per recipient and dated 1968.9.9. on the reverse. Awarded to people who helped found the DPRK in 1948 as well as those who contributed to national defense, development and progress in the past 20 years.
	Commemorative Order "Foundation of the Democratic People's Republic of Korea" 조선민주주의인민공화국창건기념훈장; Chosŏn Minjujuŭi Inmin Konghwaguk Ch'anggŏn Kinyŏm Hunjang	1978	This commemorative order was issued on the 30th and 40th anniversaries of the foundation of the DPRK. It was only awarded a maximum of twice to a single recipient. The obverse of this order is identical to the 20th Anniversary Commemorative Order but is not dated on the reverse.
	Commemorative Order "40th Anniversary of Fatherland Liberation War Victory" 조국해방전쟁승리40돐기념훈장; Choguk Haebang Chǒnjaeng Sŭngri Mahŭn-dol Kinyŏm Hunjang	1993-03-10	Awarded to former combatants and high-ranking officials to mark the fortieth anniversary of the victory in the Fatherland Liberation war(Korean War).
	Commemorative Order "5th March"; 3월5일기념훈장; Sam-wŏl O-il Kinyŏm Hunjang	1986-03-03	Awarded to commemorate 40th anniversary of North Korean land reform on March 5, 1946,
	Commemorative Order "30th Anniversary of the Agricultural Presentation" 농촌테제발표30돐년기념훈장; Nongch'on T'eje balp'yo Sŏrŭn-dolnyŏn Kinyŏm Hunjang	1994	Awarded to commemorate, and celebrate, the 30 years of agricultural success resulting from the reforms of Kim Il Sung.
	Commemorative Order "60th Anniversary of the People's Army" 조선인민군창건60돐기념훈장; Chosŏn Inmin'gun Ch'anggŏn Yesun-dol Kinyŏm Hunjang	1992-03-23	Awarded to officers and generals of the Korean People's Army for long and distinguished service by the time of the 60th anniversary of the Korean People's Army.
	Commemorative Order "Capital Construction" 수도건설기념훈장; Sudo Kŏnsŏl Kinyŏm Hunjang	1992-06-24	Awarded to senior military and civilians who had participated in the rebuilding and modernisation of Pyongyang.
	Commemorative Order "50th Anniversary of the Foundation of the Democratic People's Republic of Korea" 조선민주주의인민공화국창건50돐년기념훈장; Chosŏn Minjujuŭi Inmin Konghwaguk Ch'anggŏn Swin-dolnyŏn Kinyŏm Hunjang	1998-05-24	Awarded to those then working for the party or state for distinguished service to the state, party and armed forces.
	Commemorative Order "60th Year Anniversary of the Fatherland Liberation War Victory" 조국해방전쟁승리60돐기념훈장; Choguk Haebang Chǒnjaeng Sŭngri Yesun-dol Kinyŏm Hunjang	2013-04-24	The state commemorative medal, issued to all Korean War veterans
	Commemorative Order "70th Year Anniversary of the Fatherland Liberation War Victory" 조국해방전쟁승리70돐기념훈장; Choguk Haebang Chǒnjaeng Sŭngri Ilheun-dol Kinyŏm Hunjang	2023-06-06	The newest state commemorative medal, issued to all Korean War veterans

== Medals ==
Medal And Ribbon	Name (English/Korean/Transliteration)	Date created	Description
	Medal For Military Merit 군공메달; Kun'gong Medal	1949-06-13	Awarded for 10 years exemplary conduct or for distinguished service in combat. Awarded to more than 500,000 Koreans and more than 400,000 Chinese during the Korean War.
	Meritorious Service Medal 공로메달; Kongro Medal	1949-06-13	Awarded for meritorious labour service, achievement in developing the economy, culture and the arts.
	Medal of Military Service Honour 군사복무영예메달; Kunsa Pongmu Yŏng'ye Medal	1973-07-03	Awarded for meritorious achievement and distinguished service to lower ranks of the armed forces.
	Medal For Agricultural Merits 농업공로메달; Nong'ŏp Kongro Medal	1974-12-24	Awarded for meritorious achievement, innovation and outstanding productivity in agriculture.
	Medal of Friendship of the Democratic People's Republic of Korea 조선민주주의인민공화국친선메달; Chosŏn Minjujuŭi Inmin Konghwaguk Ch'insŏn Medal	1985-7-25	Awarded to foreign diplomatic personnel, relevant officials, technicians and experts who work hard to strengthen friendship and unity with other countries.

=== Commemorative medals ===
Medal And Ribbon	Name (English/Korean/Transliteration)	Date created	Description
Medal "For The Liberation of Korea" Ribbon	Medal for the Liberation of Korea 조선 1945.8.15; Chosŏn 1945.8.15	1948-10-16	Awarded for participation in the Korean independence armies. 10,000 awarded by 1949.
Commemorative Medal "Great Fatherland Liberation War 1950–1953" Ribbon	Commemorative Medal "Great Fatherland Liberation War 1950–1953" 위대한조국해방전쟁을기념메달 1950–1953; Widaehan Choguk Haebang Chǒnjaeng'ŭl Kinyŏm Medal 1950–1953	1953-08-15	Awarded to all active and reserve enlisted personnel, non-commissioned officers, officers, generals and admirals of the KPA who participated in the Korean War.
	Commemorative Medal "Participation In The Fatherland Liberation War 1950–1953" 조국해방전쟁참전기념메달 1950–1953; Choguk Haebang Chǒnjaeng Ch'amjŏn Kinyŏm Medal 1950–1953	1953-08-15	Awarded to all active and reserve enlisted personnel, non-commissioned officers, officers, generals and admirals of the KPA who participated in the Korean War.
Commemorative Medal "Fatherland Liberation" Ribbon	Commemorative Medal "Fatherland Liberation" 조국해방기념메달; Choguk Haebang Kinyŏm Medal	1985-7-25	Awarded to all active and reserve enlisted personnel, non-commissioned officers, officers, generals and admirals of the KPA who participated in the Korean War.
	Commemorative Medal "The Foundation of the People's Republic of Korea" 조선민주주의인민공화국창건기념메달; Chosŏn Inmin'gun Ch'anggŏn Kinyŏm Medal	1983-8-19	Awarded for outstanding achievement and distinguished service to the country.
	Commemorative Medal "20th Anniversary Of The Chongryon Foundation" ''.기념메달 "총련재단 20주년" ''.Ginyeommedal "chonglyeonjaedan 20junyeon"	1975-05-20	Awarded to Chongryon members in good standing during the organization's 20th Anniversary since its founding in 1955.
	Commemorative Medal "50th Anniversary Of The Chongryon Foundation"	2005-05-20	Awarded to Chongryon members in good standing during the organization's 50th Anniversary since its founding in 1955.
	Commemorative Medal "Cheonggang Power Plant Dam Construction" 정강산발전소건설기념메달; Chŏnggang Sanbaljŏnso Kŏnsŏl Kinyŏm Medal	1990s	Awarded to individuals that practicipated in the construction of the dam.
	Commemorative Medal "60th Anniversary of the People's Army"	1992-03-23	Awarded to lower ranks of the Korean People's Army for long and distinguished service by the time of the 60th anniversary of the Korean People's Army.
	Commemorative Medal "Capital Construction" 수도건설기념메달; Sudo Kŏnsŏl Kinyŏm Medal	1992-6-24	Awarded to military and civilians who had participated in the rebuilding and modernisation of Pyongyang.
	Commemorative Medal "Mt. Kumgang Power Plant Construction"	1996-9-11	Awarded to individuals that practicipated in the construction of the Kumgang Power plant.
	Commemorative Medal "Pyongyang-Nampho Highway Construction" 평양-남포고속도로건설기념메달; P'yŏngyang-Namp'o Kosoktoro Kŏnsŏl Kinyŏm Medal	2000-9-13	Awarded to individuals that practicipated in the construction of the Pyongyang-Nampho Highway.
	Commemorative Medal "Military Parade" 열병식기념메달; Yŏlbyŏngsik Kinyŏm Medal	1997-03-26	Awarded to military units taking part in the various military parades in commemoration of state holidays.
	Commemorative Medal "Huicheon Power Plant Construction" 희천발전소건설기념메달; Huichŏn Paljŏnso Kŏnsŏl Kinyŏm Medal	2011-10-23	Awarded to civilians and military for taking part in the construction of the Huicheon Power Plant.
	Commemorative Medal "Paektusan Youth Power Station Construction" 백두산청년발전소건설기념메달 Paektusan Chongnyon Paljŏnso Kŏnsŏl Kinyŏm Medal	2016	Awarded to individuals that practicipated in the construction of the Paektusan Youth Power Station Construction.

== Prizes ==
Medal And Ribbon	Name (English/Korean/Transliteration)	Date created	Description
	Kim Il Sung Prize		
	Kim Jong Il Prize	2012-02-03	Awarded to people who have made contributions to science, education, public health, literature and arts, media and sports
	International Kim Il-sung Prize	1993-04-13	
	International Kim Jong-il Prize	2012-12-24	
	Kim Il Sung Youth Honor Prize	1972-01-08	
	Kim Il Sung Children Honor Prize	2012-02-03	
	Kim Jong Il Youth Honor Prize	2012-02-03	
	Kim Jong Il Children Honor Prize		
	National Reunification Prize	1990	Awarded to people and martyrs who have contributed toward Korean reunification
	People's Prize	1958-09-08	
	February 16 Science and Technology Prize	2021	
	Technical Innovation Torch Prize		
	April 18 Best Player Prize	2006	
	Prize of Honor for Model Machine No. 26		
	Prize of Honor for Twice Model Machine No. 26	2006-10-25	

== Badges ==
Medal And Ribbon	Name (English/Korean/Transliteration)	Date created	Description
	Guards Badge 근위휘장 Kŭnwi hwijang	1950s	Based on the Soviet system the Guards honorary title is awarded to combat units for heroic feats of heroism in battle. Worn by soldiers of the units that hold the Guards honorary title.
	Commemorative Badge "20th Anniversary of the Foundation of the People's Army" 조선인민군창건20주년기념휘장; Chosŏn Minjujuŭi Inmin Konghwaguk Ch'anggŏn Isip Chunyŏn Kinyŏm Hwijang	1968-02-08	
	Chollima Honour Badge 천리마 영예 휘장; Ch'ŏllima Yŏng'ye Hwijang	1968-05-11	Awarded to factories and work teams that performed distinguished service or meritorious achievement in economic production or defence construction.

== Honorary titles ==
Honorary titles include:

- Actor Emeritus
- Artist Emeritus
- Merited Actor
- Merited Athlete
- Merited Artist
- Merited Doctor
- Merited Fisherman
- Merited Journalist
- Merited Miner
- Merited Pharmacist
- Merited Railroad Worker
- Merited Scientist
- Merited Technician
- Merited Teacher
- October 8 Exemplary Educationist
- "People's titles"
  - People's Actor
  - People's Athlete
  - People's Artist
  - People's Journalist
  - People's Scientist
  - People's Techinican
  - People's Teacher
  - People's Announcer

== See also ==
- Awards and decorations received by Kim Il-sung
- Awards and decorations received by Kim Jong-il
- Korean People's Army
- Kim Il Sung and Kim Jong Il badges
- Socialist orders of merit
