= International Kim Jong Il Prize =

- Awarded for: Political, social or academic distinction or contributions to independence, peace and cultural development of humanity
- Country: North Korea
- Presented by: International Kim Jong-il Prize Council

The International Kim Jong Il Prize (Korean: 국제김정일상) is a North Korean award named after the country's second leader, Kim Jong Il. It was created on December 24, 2012, approximately a year after his death.

== Contents ==
The International Kim Jong Il Prize consists of a diploma, medal and trophy.

== Rules of conferment ==
- The Prize is conferred upon distinguished figures in political, social and academic circles and those who have made special contributions to the independence of the country and nation and to the global independence and peace and cultural development of humanity.
- The Prize is conferred according to the decision of the International Kim Jong Il Prize Council.

== Recipients ==
- In 2013, the council awarded the prize to Obiang Nguema Mbasogo, president of Equatorial Guinea "for his commitment to justice, development, peace and harmony." President Obiang received his award in person in Pyongyang on August 7, 2013.
- Kenichi Ogami, secretary general of the International Institute of the Juche Idea (2017) for "actively conduct[ing] the study and dissemination of the Juche idea for decades while fully supporting the Korean people's struggle for national reunification and international justice".

== The International Kim Jong-il Prize Council ==
The council selects and decides the candidate and organizes the conferment of the Prize. The council was officially registered in India. Its headquarters is in New Delhi, India. The Council consists of 1 secretary-general and 7 directors.

== See also ==
- Orders and medals of North Korea
- Order of Kim Jong Il
- International Kim Il-sung Prize
