= Committees of the 4th Supreme People's Assembly =

4th Committees
- Sign of the Supreme People's Assembly

16 December 1967 – 28 December 1972 (5 years, 12 days) Overview
- Type: Bills Committee; Budget Committee; Credentials Committee; Foreign Affairs Committee
- Election: 1st Session of the 4th Supreme People's Assembly

The committees of the 4th Supreme People's Assembly (SPA) of North Korea were elected by the 1st Session of the 4th SPA on 16 December 1967. They were replaced on 28 December 1972 by the committees of the 5th Supreme People's Assembly.

== Committees ==
=== Bills ===
Rank	Name	Hangul	3rd COM	5th COM	Positions
1	Kim Yo-jung	김요정	New	Demoted	Chairman of the SPA Bill Committee
2	Yi Yong-gu	이용구	New	Demoted	—
3	Kim Chwa-hyok	김채혁	New	Demoted	—
4	Paek Hak-nim	백학림	New	Demoted	—
5	Yi Rim-su	이림수	New	Demoted	—
6	Yom Tae-jun	염태준	New	Demoted	—
7	Kim Chang-bok	김창복	New	Demoted	—
8	Ri Sung-gi	리승기	New	Demoted	—
9	Kim Kuk-hun	김국훈	Old	Demoted	—

=== Budget ===
Rank	Name	Hangul	3rd COM	5th COM	Positions
1	Yim Kye-chol	임계철	Old	Demoted	Chairman of the SPA Budget Committee
2	Kang Hui-won	강희원	Old	Demoted	—
3	O Che-ryong	오체룡	Old	Demoted	—
4	Yi Won-bom	이원봄	New	Demoted	—
5	Chang Yun-pil	장윤필	Old	Demoted	—
6	Kim Sok-hyong	김석형	New	Demoted	—
7	Yi Chong-guk	이종국	New	Demoted	—
8	Yun Yon-hwan	윤연환	Old	Demoted	—
9	Choe Chun-sop	최춘섭	New	Demoted	—
10	Han Chong-gi	한종기	New	Demoted	—
11	Kim Rak-hui	김락희	New	Demoted	—

=== Credentials ===
Rank	Name	Hangul	3rd COM	5th COM	Positions
1	Yi Kuk-chin	이국진	New	Not made public	Chairman of the SPA Credentials Committee
2	Kim Sok-yong	김석용	New	Not made public	—
3	Kim Yong-ho	김용호	New	Not made public	—
4	Yim Hyong-gu	임형구	New	Not made public	—
5	Choe Chong-gon	최종곤	New	Not made public	—
6	Yi Tal-yong	이탈용	New	Not made public	—
7	Yi Kye-san	이계산	New	Not made public	—

=== Foreign Affairs ===
Rank	Name	Hangul	3rd COM	5th COM	Positions
1	So Chol	서철	New	Dissolved	Chairman of the SPA Foreign Affairs Committee
2	Chon Chang-chol	전창철	New	Dissolved	—
3	Kim Ok-sun	김옥선	Old	Dissolved	—
4	Choe Chung-guk	최청국	New	Dissolved	—
5	O Ki-chon	오기촌	New	Dissolved	—
6	O Hyon-ju	오현주	New	Dissolved	—
7	Yi Yun-do	이윤도	New	Dissolved	—
