= Jon Ha-chol =

North Korean politician

- 전하철

Vice Premier of North Korea
- Supreme Leader: Kim Jong Il

Personal details
- Born: 22 April 1928 (age 98) North Korea
- Party: Workers' Party of Korea
- Education: Kim Il Sung University

Military service
- Allegiance: North Korea

Chon Ha-chol (Korean: 전하철; born April 22, 1928) is a North Korean politician, deputy prime minister of the DPRK.

== Biography ==
Chon Ha-chol was born on April 22, 1928, in Huchang County in North Pyongyang Province (now Kimhyongjik County in Ryanggang Province). Graduate of the Kim Il Sung University in Pyongyang. He started his political career in the 1960s as the deputy director of the department in the office of the Primer of North Korea. In November 1970, at the 5th Congress of the Workers' Party of Korea, for the first time he became a deputy member of the Central Committee. He maintained this position after the 6th Congress in October 1980.

In June 1983, he assumed the position of chairman of the Economic Planning Commission of Ryanggang Province. He became a full member of the Central Committee for the first time in December 1983. In the Central Committee from October 1987 he was the deputy director of one of the departments. From February 1989, deputy director of a government institution dealing with the central management of raw materials. In June 1990, Jŏn Ha Ch'ŏl became the personal secretary of the then North Korean leader Kim Il Sung.

Deputy of the Supreme People's Assembly of the DPRK, the parliament of the DPRK, from the 7th to the 9th term (i.e. from February 1982 to September 1998), and from June 2010 (when he took the vacant mandate of one of the deceased parliamentarians) in the current, 12th term.

In 2006, he took the position of deputy director of the Financial Planning Department in the Central Committee. During the 3rd Conference of the Workers' Party of Korea on September 28, 2010, he was elected to the Central Committee for the second time. At that time, he also became the deputy prime minister of the North Korean cabinet.

Following the death of Kim Jong Il in December 2011, Chon Ha-chol ranked 32nd on the 233-person funeral committee..

He was awarded the Order of Kim Il Sung (April 1985), and the Order of Kim Jong Il (February 2012).
