= International Kim Il Sung Prize =

- Date: April 1993
- Country: North Korea
- Presented by: International Kim Il-sung Foundation

The International Kim Il Sung Prize (Korean: 국제김일성상) is an award conferred for contributions in the study and proliferation of the Juche idea. It is named in honour of Kim Il Sung, the first supreme leader of the North Korea, credited with creation of the Juche idea.

The prize was instituted on 13 April 1993, when North Korea organised the International Kim Il Sung Prize Council in New Delhi, India, to celebrate the 81st birthday of Kim Il-sung (15 April 1993) internationally.

The International Kim Il Sung Prize consists of a gold medal, certificate, a sum of money and a souvenir token.

== Prize Council ==
The International Kim Il Sung Prize Council selects and decides the candidate and organizes the conferment of the prize. The Council was officially registered in India and its headquarters is in New Delhi. The Council consists of one secretary-general and seven directors.

The composition of the council is not made public, but the following persons are known to have been members:

- Alva Chavez, director (2002), member (2007)
- Shuhachi Inoue, director, 2002
- Vishwanath, secretary general, 2012

Since 2007, the prize has been awarded by the International Kim Il Sung Foundation (reorganized as the Kim Il-sung-Kim Jong-il Foundation in 2012).

== Recipients ==
- Shuhachi Inoue, 1993, first recipient
- One person was awarded in 1994, another one in 1995, and two people in 1996
- Vishwanath, 13 April 2002
- Kim Jong Il, 16 February 2007
- Norodom Sihanouk, 29 March 2012
- Ramón Jiménez López, director-general of the International Institute of the Juche Idea, 6 April 2018

In 2014, Ugandan president Yoweri Museveni was nominated for the award, but repeatedly declined to receive it.

== See also ==
- Kim Il-sung Prize
- Orders and medals of North Korea
- Order of Kim Il Sung
- International Kim Jong-il Prize
