= Choe Sam Suk =

North Korean singer (born 1951)

Choe Sam Suk People's Actress
- 최삼숙
- Born: June 15, 1951 (age 74); Changpung County, Kaesong, North Hwanghae, North Korea
- Education: Bachelor of Arts
- Occupation: Singer
- Years active: 1971–present
- Awards: People's Actress
- Honours: Order of the National Flag

Choe Sam Suk (Korean: 최삼숙) is a North Korean singer.

== Early life ==
Born in North Hwanghae province to a family of teachers, Choe graduated from the Higher Postal School in Pyongyang after the Korean War had ended and worked as a worker in a Pyongyang textile factory for three years from 1968. Choe was reported to have a unique artistic talent from an early age, while working in the factory, she actively participated in the factory's art group activities and received good reviews when she participated in the National Workers' Art Festival.

== Career as a voice actor ==
In 1971, Choe was summoned to the Film and Radio Music Orchestra and worked as a vocalist for over 20 years. She was the lead actress and singer in the North Korean opera The Flower Girl. Hundreds of movie theme songs were recorded by her in the proceeding 20 years. Along with the movie theme songs, some of the most renowned songs performed by her included My Mother, Bosom of the Motherland and songs Kim Il-Sung Flower in full boom, Foliage is burning red and Let's hold the party of one heart, overall she recorded or performed over 2700 songs. She participated in both domestic and foreign performances. In 1982, she was awarded the title of People's Artist and many other decorations and medals including the First Class of the Order of the National Flag.

As of 1995, it was reported that she was working as a vocal teacher at Pyongyang University of Music and Dance.

== Daughter's defection ==
In 2015, it was reported that her daughter was among 13 restaurant workers who defected from China to South Korea.
