= Ri Yong-suk =

North Korean politician (1916–2021)

- 리영숙

Member of the Supreme People's Assembly
- Supreme Leader: Kim Il Sung

Personal details
- Born: 17 April 1916
- Died: November 2021 (aged 105)
- Resting place: Revolutionary Martyrs' Cemetery
- Citizenship: North Korean
- Party: Workers' Party of Korea

Military service
- Allegiance: North Korea
- Branch/service: Korean People's Army

Korean name
- Hangul: 리영숙
- RR: Ri Yeongsuk
- MR: Ri Yŏngsuk

Ri Yong-suk (Korean: 리영숙, 17 April 1916 – November 2021) was a North Korean politician and revolutionary. A veteran of the anti-Japanese struggle, Ri had close relations with all three generations of the Kim dynasty. During WWII, she was with Kim Il Sung in the Soviet 88th Separate Rifle Brigade. During the Korean War, she took care of Kim Jong Il, eldest son and future heir of Kim Il Sung. Under Kim Jong Un, she was portrayed as a link between the original guerrilla generation and the current leadership. Ri was elected to the Supreme People's Assembly in 1998 and 2003.

== Early life and Kim family ==
Ri Yong-suk was born on 17 April 1916. Ri fought as a guerrilla during the anti-Japanese struggle. During World War II, she was a member of the Soviet 88th Separate Rifle Brigade, to which Kim Il Sung was also attached. According to Kim, in his 1992 autobiography With the Century, Ri was married to An Yong:

Before departure, I saw to it that An Yong met his wife. Ri Yong Suk, An Yong's wife, was in Camp North. She had married him, the night school teacher of her village, on the advice of her parents and fought together with him in Choe Yong Gon's unit. After her husband had gone to the Soviet Union to learn radio operation, she had not heard from him. How eagerly he must have wanted to see her, as he had heard she was in Camp North! So I told him to meet his wife. In the heart of a man who goes on a difficult mission there must be no clouds. After seeing her he seemed to have been further encouraged; he was all smiles.

Kim also wrote that Ri was trained as a radio operator. Speaking of her guerrilla days, she remembered both Kim's wife Kim Jong Suk and the birth of their son Kim Jong Il. Ri "recollected that Kim Jong Suk provided noble tradition of devotedly defending the leader and gave birth to General Secretary Kim Jong Il in the days of hard-fought anti-Japanese struggle, thus guaranteeing the brilliant future of Korea", and that:

Kim Jong Il was born in a log-cabin in the deep forest of Mt. Paektu, with no address, and grew up with sounds of gunfire of the anti-Japanese war as a lullaby.
We women guerrillas felt very sorry we could not obtain new clothes for him who was born as the Shining Star of Korea. We had to make clothes for him by shortening military uniforms, and patched bits of cloth into a quilt for him.

In reality, Kim Jong Il was born in a military camp in the Soviet Union.

During the Korean War, Ri took care of Kim Jong Il. The two met often throughout Kim's life and career. Kim had even been seen embracing Ri, although he was known to rarely physically express affection. North Korean propaganda put effort in showing Ri in close terms with Kim Jong Un. The message is that Ri passed down lived guerrilla experience to Kim Jong Un.

In 2016, she was noted as being one of the few remaining female guerrilla (Northeast Anti-Japanese United Army) leaders.

== Political career ==
After the liberation of Korea, she became the chairwoman of the management committee of a cooperative farm in Yonsan County in North Hwanghae Province.

Ri was elected to the Supreme People's Assembly in 1998 and 2003.

== Later life and death ==
She was awarded the Jubilee Medal "70 Years of Victory in the Great Patriotic War 1941–1945" on 6 May 2015 by Vladimir Putin and Jubilee Medal "75 Years of Victory in the Great Patriotic War 1941–1945" on 6 May 2020.

Ri was on the funeral committees of Kim Chol-man, Ri Ul-sol, and Hwang Sun-hui.

She was awarded the Order of Kim Il Sung, Order of Kim Jong Il, and Hero of Labor, and also received a birthday spread sent from Kim Jong Un on the occasion of her 105th birthday.

Ri died in November 2021, at the age of 105. Kim Jong Un visited her grave later that same month at the Revolutionary Martyrs' Cemetery in Mount Taesong on 15 November to lay a wreath.

== See also ==
- Politics of North Korea
