= Kang Ki-sop =

North Korean politician (d. 2017)

- Died: 2017
- Occupations: Politician, alternate member of WPK Central Committee

Kang Ki-sop (Korean: 강기섭; died 2017) was a North Korean politician. He was the Director of North Korea's General Administration of Civil Aviation (민용항공총국), and was an alternate member of the Central Committee of the Workers' Party of Korea. He died in January 2017.

== Career ==
He was appointed Director of the General Civil Aviation Administration in 2010. In September 2010, he was elected an alternate member of the Central Committee of the Workers' Party of Korea.

In April 2009, he became a delegate to the 12th session of the Supreme People's Assembly (SPA). He was also a delegate to the 13th session of the SPA in 2014.

Kang served as a member of the national mourning committee upon the death of Kim Jong Il in December 2011.

== Awards and honors ==
A frame containing all decorations presented to Kang was displayed during his funeral.

Hero of the DPRK

Order of Kim Il Sung

Order of the National Flag First Class, twice

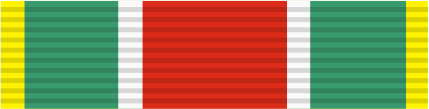
Order of Korean Labour

Commemorative Order "20th Anniversary of the Foundation of the Democratic People's Republic of Korea"

Commemorative Order "Foundation of the Democratic People's Republic of Korea"

Commemorative Order "60th Anniversary of the People's Army"

Commemorative Order "Anniversary of the Foundation of the People's Army"

Order of Military Service Honour First Class

Order of the National Flag Second Class, three times

Order of the Red Banner of Three Great Revolutions

Order of Military Service Honour Second Class

Order of Military Service Honour Third Class

Order of the National Flag Third Class, three times

Soldier's Medal of Honour Second Class

Medal For Military Merit, twice

Medal of Military Service Honour

Commemorative Medal "Military Parade"

Commemorative Medal "Fatherland Liberation"
