= Marcos Morales Torres =

Mexican politician

- Born: 26 November 1944 (age 81); Mexico City, Mexico
- Education: IPN
- Occupation: Politician
- Political party: PRD

Marcos Morales Torres (Note: In this Mexican name, the surname is Morales and the second or maternal family name is Torres.) (born 26 November 1944) is a Mexican politician affiliated with the Party of the Democratic Revolution (PRD).

A native of Mexico City, he served from 2000 to 2003 in the Legislative Assembly of the Federal District, and in 2003–2006 he served as a federal deputy in the 59th Congress, representing the Federal District's first district.
