= Committees of the 2nd Supreme People's Assembly =

North Korean government committees

2nd Committees
- Sign of the Supreme People's Assembly

20 September 1957 – 22 October 1962 (5 years, 32 days) Overview
- Type: Bills Committee; Budget Committee; Credentials Committee; Foreign Affairs Committee
- Election: 1st Session of the 2nd Supreme People's Assembly

The Committees of the 2nd Supreme People's Assembly (SPA) of North Korea was elected by the 1st Session of the 2nd SPA on 20 September 1957. They were replaced on 23 October 1962 by the committees of the 3rd Supreme People's Assembly.

== Committees ==
=== Bills ===
Rank	Name	Hangul	1st COM	3rd COM	Positions
1	Kim Ik-son	김익손	?	Reelected	Chairman of the SPA Bill Committee
2	Kim Yong-jin	김용진	?	Demoted	—
3	Sin Nam-chol	신남철	?	Demoted	—
4	Cho Yong	조용	?	Demoted	—
5	Yu Chol-mok	유철목	?	Demoted	—
6	Choe Chong-hak	최종묵	?	Demoted	—
7	Yi Yu-min	이유민	?	Demoted	—
8	Ho Hak-song	호학송	?	Demoted	—
9	Han In-sok	한인석	?	Demoted	—

=== Budget ===
Rank	Name	Hangul	1st COM	3rd COM	Positions
1	Song Pong-uk	송퐁욱	?	Demoted	Chairman of the SPA Budget Committee
2	Paek Nam-un	백남운	?	Demoted	—
3	Chon Tae-hwan	전태환	?	Demoted	—
4	Kim Sang-chol	김상철	?	Demoted	—
5	Chong Tu-hwan	종투환	?	Demoted	—
6	Kim Tuk-nan	김턱난	?	Demoted	—
7	Hyon Hun	현훈	?	Demoted	—
8	Song Chang-nyom	송창	?	Demoted	—
9	Yi Chae-chon	이채촌	?	Demoted	—
10	Hwang Sun-chon		?	Demoted	—
11	Choe Chol-hwan	황순촌	?	Demoted	—
12	Chang Yun-pil	장윤필	?	Reelected	—
13	Chong Yon-pyo	종연표	?	Demoted	—
14	Mun Tae-hwan	문태환	?	Demoted	—
15	So Chun-sik	소춘식	?	Demoted	—
16	Kim Mun-gun	김문군	?	Demoted	—
17	Yim Kun-sang	임건상	?	Demoted	—

=== Credentials ===
Rank	Name	Hangul	1st COM	3rd COM	Positions
1	Yi Hyo-sun	이효선	?	Demoted	Chairman of the SPA Credentials Committee
2	Kim Tae-gun	김태군	?	Demoted	—
3	Kim Won-bong	김원봉	?	Demoted	—
4	Yi Hong-yol	이홍열	?	Demoted	—
5	Sin Hong-ye	신홍예	?	Demoted	—
6	Pak Chang-sik	박창식	?	Demoted	—
7	Pak Yong-tae	박용태	?	Demoted	—

=== Foreign Affairs ===
Rank	Name	Hangul	1st COM	3rd COM	Positions
1	Kim Chang-man	김창만	?	Demoted	Chairman of the SPA Foreign Affairs Committee
2	Kim Man-gum	김만검	?	Demoted	—
3	Kim Yong-su	김용수	?	Demoted	—
4	Hong Chung-sik	홍정식	?	Demoted	—
5	Ho Pin	호핀	?	Demoted	—
6	Pak Yong-guk	박용국	?	Reelected	—
7	Ko Kyong-in	고경인	?	Demoted	—
