= Ramón Jiménez López =

Mexican lawyer and politician

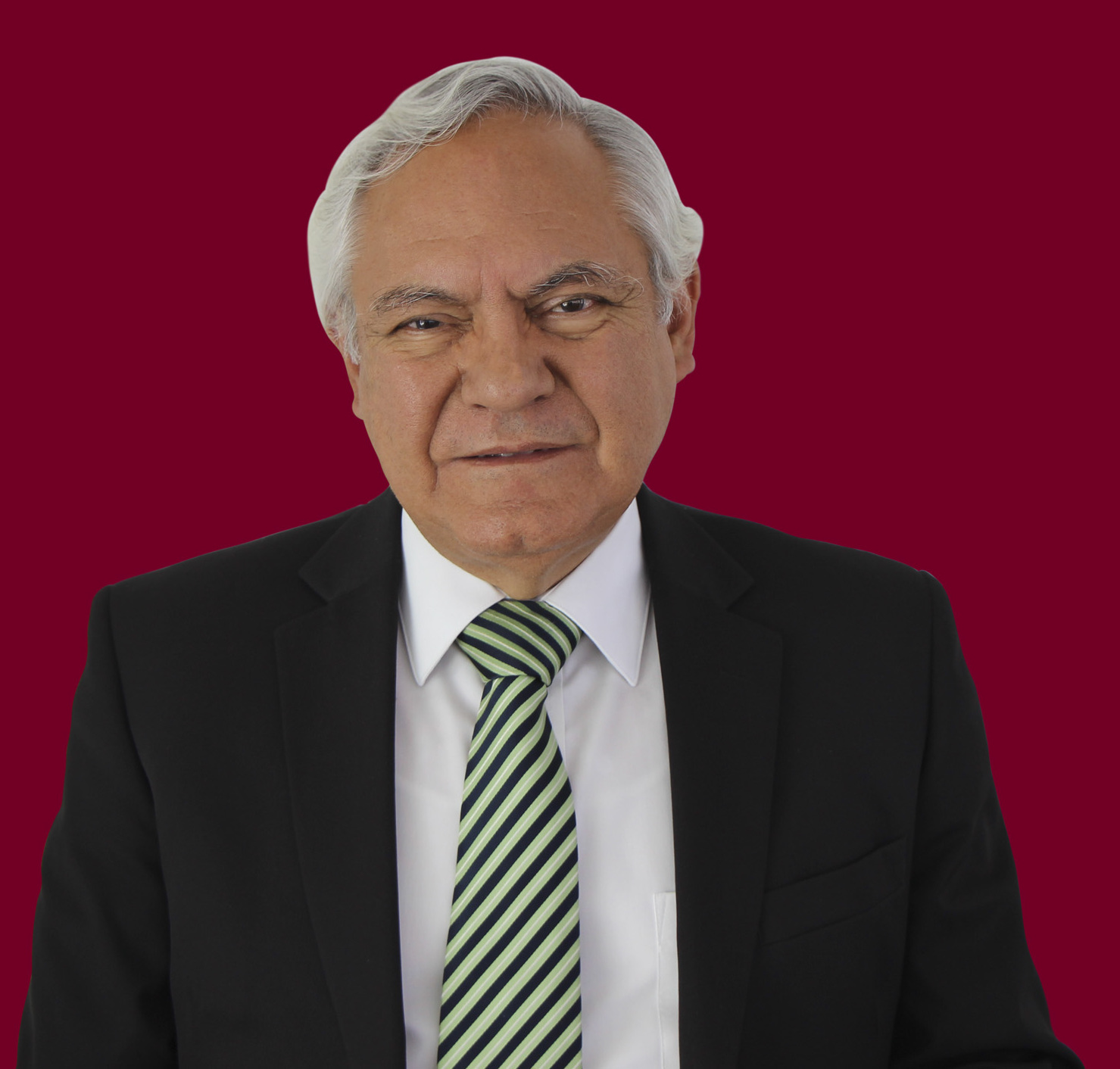
- Ramón Jiménez López
- Born: 19 November 1951 (age 74); Mexico City, Mexico
- Occupations: Lawyer and politician
- Political party: PPS, PRD, Morena

Ramón Jiménez López (Note: In this Spanish name, the first or paternal surname is Jiménez and the second or maternal family name is López.) (born 19 November 1951) is a Mexican politician. Previously affiliated with the Popular Socialist Party (PPS) and the Party of the Democratic Revolution (PRD), he is currently aligned with the National Regeneration Movement (Morena).

On the international stage, he has been the director-general of the International Institute of the Juche Idea since at least 2017.

== Political career ==
From 2009 to 2012 he served as a federal deputy in the 61st Congress, representing the Federal District's first district for the PRD.

In 2015 he contended the election for mayor of the Mexico City borough of Gustavo A. Madero for Morena but lost to Víctor Hugo Lobo of a PRD-led coalition.

In December 2018, Head of Government Claudia Sheinbaum appointed Jiménez López the director of the Mexico City Passenger Transport Network (RTP), and, following his 2019 appointment by President Andrés Manuel López Obrador, he is the general director of the Tecnológico Nacional de México public university system.

== Kimilsungism–Kimjongilism ==
Jiménez López founded the Mexican Committee for the Study of Kimilsungism (Note: Comité Mexicano de Estudios del Kimilsunismo; renamed the Mexican Committee for the Study of Kimilsungism-Kimjongilism in August 2012.) in 2004 – a reference to the Juche philosophy of the North Korean regime – and, as the director-general of the International Institute of the Juche Idea, received the International Kim Il Sung Prize in 2018.

In a 2013 interview with Letras Libres magazine, Jiménez López described the Juche idea as "extraordinary", expressed his admiration for its "monolithic unity" between the leader, the party, and the people, and said he would very much like to live in North Korea.
