= 1st federal electoral district of Mexico City =

Federal electoral district of Mexico

Mexico City's 1st
- Electoral district of the Chamber of Deputies of Mexico

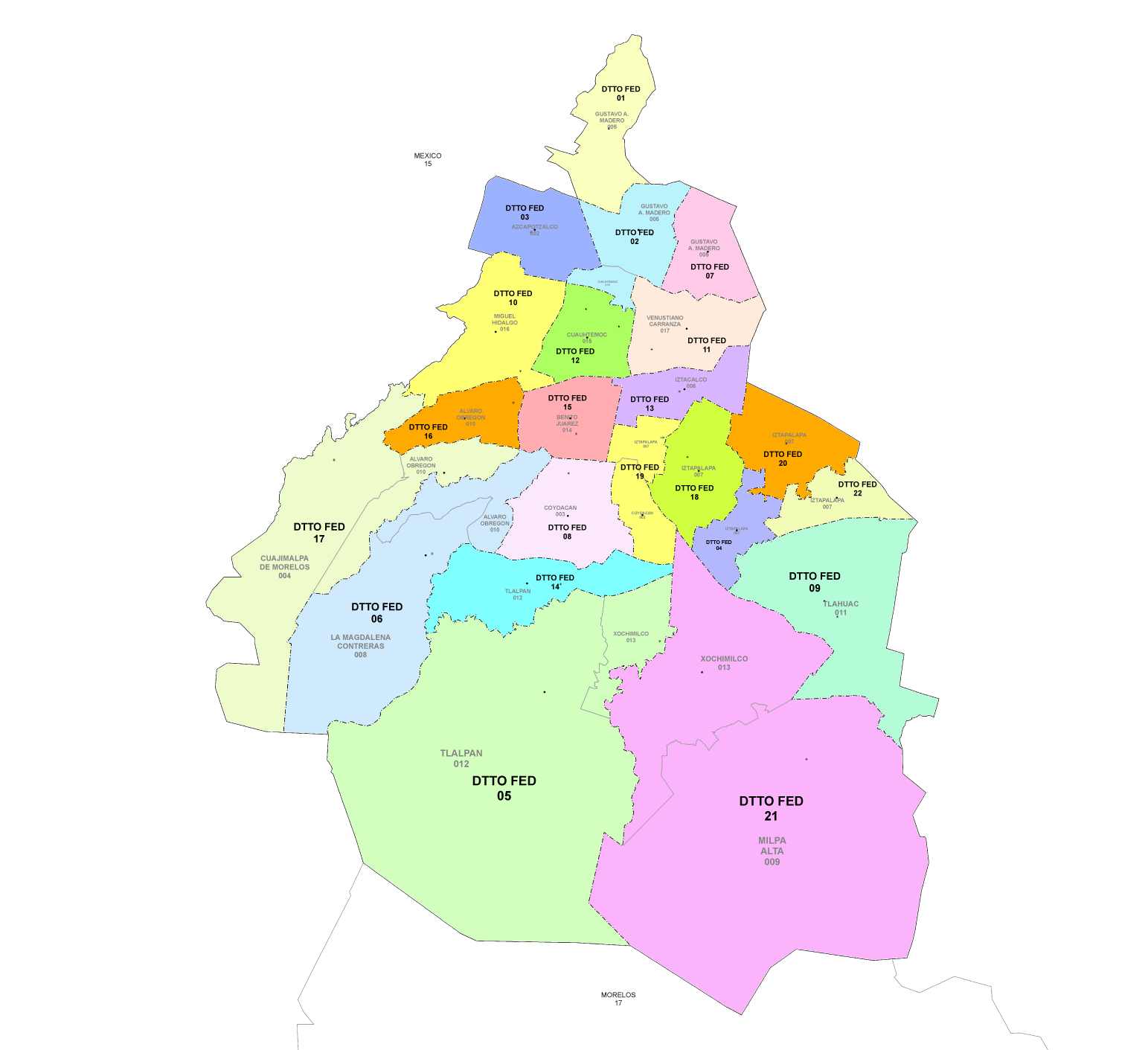
- 1st district since 2023

Incumbent
- Member: Emiliano Álvarez López
- Party: ▌Morena
- Congress: 66th (2024–2027)

District
- State: Mexico City
- Head town: Gustavo A. Madero
- Coordinates: 19°28′56″N 99°06′45″W
- Covers: Gustavo A. Madero (part)
- PR region: Fourth
- Precincts: 248
- Population: 423,839 (2020 census)

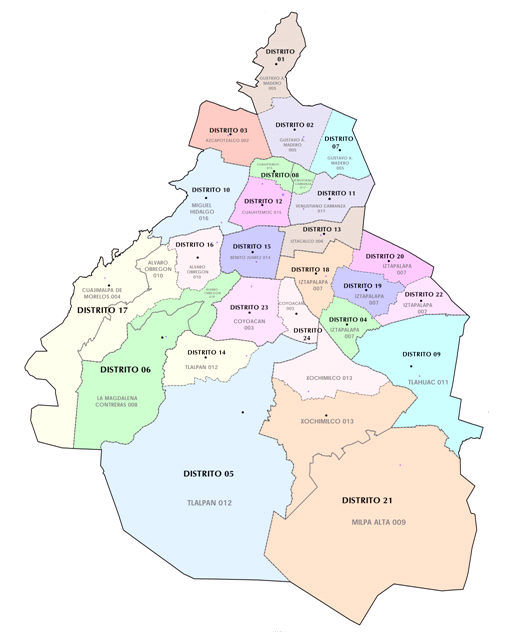
Mexico City under the 2017–2022 districting plan

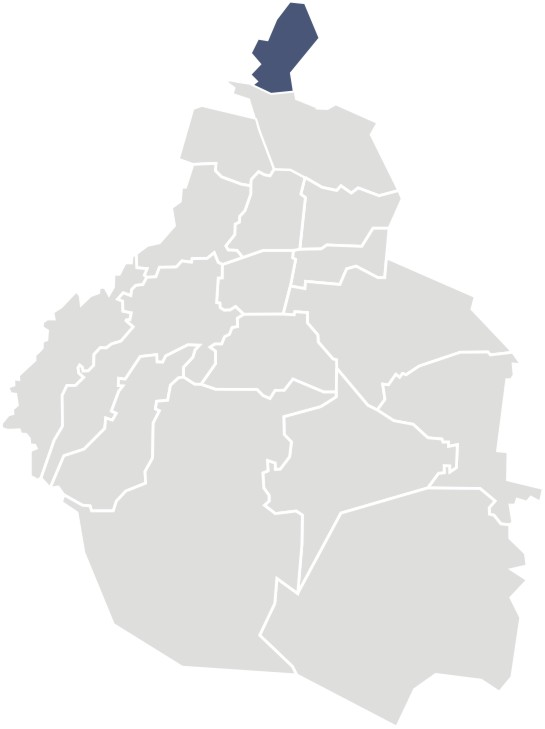
1st district in 2005–2017

The 1st federal electoral district of Mexico City (Spanish: Distrito electoral federal 01 de la Ciudad de México; previously "of the Federal District") is one of the 300 electoral districts into which Mexico is divided for elections to the federal Chamber of Deputies and one of 22 such districts in Mexico City.

It elects one deputy to the lower house of Congress for each three-year legislative session by means of the first-past-the-post system. Votes cast in the district also count towards the calculation of proportional representation ("plurinominal") deputies elected from the fourth region.

César Cravioto Romero of the National Regeneration Movement (Morena) was elected for the district in the 2024 general election but resigned his seat at the start of the congressional session. He was replaced by his alternate, Jesús Emiliano Álvarez López.

== District territory ==
Under the 2023 districting plan adopted by the National Electoral Institute (INE), which is to be used for the 2024, 2027 and 2030 federal elections, the 1st district covers 248 electoral precincts (secciones electorales) across the northern portion of the borough (alcaldía) of Gustavo A. Madero. This makes it the northernmost congressional district in the capital.

The district reported a population of 423,839 in the 2020 census.

== Previous districting schemes ==
Evolution of electoral district numbers
	1974	1978	1996	2005	2017	2023
Mexico City (Federal District)	27	40	30	27	24	22
Chamber of Deputies	196	300				

1996, 2005 and 2017 plans

Since 1996, the 1st district has traditionally covered the northernmost portion of Gustavo A. Madero.

1978–1996

The districting scheme in force from 1978 to 1996 was the result of the 1977 electoral reforms, which increased the number of single-member seats in the Chamber of Deputies from 196 to 300. Under that plan, the Federal District's seat allocation rose from 27 to 40. The 1st district covered a portion of the borough of Cuauhtémoc in the centre of the city.

== Deputies returned to Congress ==
(Mexico) National parties
- Current
- PAN
- PRI
- PT
- PVEM
- MC
- Morena
- PAZ
- Somos
- Defunct or local only
- PLM
- PNR
- PRM
- PNM
- PP
- PPS
- PARM
- PFCRN
- CON
- PANAL
- PSD
- PES
- PES
- PRD

Mexico City's 1st district
Election	Deputy	Party	Term	Legislature
1916	Ignacio L. Pesqueira		1916–1917	Constituent Congress of Querétaro
1917	Eduardo Hay	PLC	1917–1918	27th Congress
1918	Francisco Cravioto Gallardo		1918–1920	28th Congress
1920	Herminio Pérez Abreu	PLC	1920–1922	29th Congress
1922	Ezequiel Salcedo		1922–1924	30th Congress
1924	Leopoldo Zincúnegui Tercero		1924–1926	31st Congress
1926	Eulalio Martínez		1926–1928	32nd Congress
1928	Aníbal M. Cervantes	CI	1928–1930	33rd Congress
1930	Samuel Villarreal, Jr.	Institutional Revolutionary Party	1930–1932	34th Congress
1932	Luis L. León	Institutional Revolutionary Party	1932–1934	35th Congress
1934	Maximiliano Chávez Aldeco	Institutional Revolutionary Party	1934–1937	36th Congress
1937	José Muñoz Cota	Institutional Revolutionary Party	1937–1940	37th Congress
1940	Lamberto Zúñiga	PRUN	1940–1943	38th Congress
1943	Francisco Linares	Institutional Revolutionary Party	1943-1946	39th Congress
1946	Manuel Peña Vera	Institutional Revolutionary Party	1946-1949	40th Congress
1949	Rafael S. Pimentel	Institutional Revolutionary Party	1949–1952	41st Congress
1952	Pedro Julio Pedrero Gómez	Institutional Revolutionary Party	1952–1955	42nd Congress
1955	César Velázquez Sánchez	Institutional Revolutionary Party	1955–1958	43rd Congress
1958	Antonio Aguilar Sandoval	Institutional Revolutionary Party	1958–1961	44th Congress
1961	Jorge Abarca Calderón	Institutional Revolutionary Party	1961–1964	45th Congress
1964	Arturo López Portillo	Institutional Revolutionary Party	1964–1967	46th Congress
1967	Pedro Luis Bartilotti Perea	Institutional Revolutionary Party	1967–1970	47th Congress
1970	León Michel Vega	Institutional Revolutionary Party	1970–1973	48th Congress
1973	Guillermo Gabino Vázquez Alfaro	Institutional Revolutionary Party	1973–1976	49th Congress
1976	Eduardo Andrade Sánchez	Institutional Revolutionary Party	1976–1979	50th Congress
1979	Carlos Dufoo López	Institutional Revolutionary Party	1979–1982	51st Congress
1982	Pedro Luis Bartilotti Perea	Institutional Revolutionary Party	1982–1985	52nd Congress
1985	Manuel Gurría Ordóñez	Institutional Revolutionary Party	1985–1988	53rd Congress
1988	Jaime Guillermo Aviña Zepeda	National Action Party (Mexico)	1988–1991	54th Congress
1991	José de la Herrán	Institutional Revolutionary Party	1991–1994	55th Congress
1994	Manuel Arciniega Portillo	National Action Party (Mexico)	1994–1997	56th Congress
1997	César Lonche Castellanos	Party of the Democratic Revolution	1997–2000	57th Congress
2000	Julieta Prieto Furhken	Ecologist Green Party of Mexico	2000–2003	58th Congress
2003	Marcos Morales Torres	Party of the Democratic Revolution	2003–2006	59th Congress
2006	Andrés Lozano Lozano	Party of the Democratic Revolution	2006–2009	60th Congress
2009	Ramón Jiménez López	Party of the Democratic Revolution	2009–2012	61st Congress
2012	Lizbeth Rosas Montero	Party of the Democratic Revolution	2012–2015	62nd Congress
2015	Alberto Martínez Urincho	Party of the Democratic Revolution	2015–2018	63rd Congress
2018	Vanessa del Castillo Ibarra	National Regeneration Movement	2018–2021	64th Congress
2021	Vanessa del Castillo Ibarra	National Regeneration Movement	2021–2024	65th Congress
2024	César Cravioto Romero (Note: Cravioto Romero resigned his seat on 1 September 2024 to serve as secretary of government of Mexico City. He was replaced by his alternate, Álvarez López.); Jesús Emiliano Álvarez López	National Regeneration Movement	2024–2027	66th Congress

== Presidential elections ==
Mexico City's 1st district
Election	District won by	Party or coalition	%
2018	Andrés Manuel López Obrador	Juntos Haremos Historia	66.0852
2024	Claudia Sheinbaum Pardo	Sigamos Haciendo Historia	68.2925
