= Jubilee Medal "70 Years of Victory in the Great Patriotic War 1941–1945" =

Commemorative medal of several post-Soviet countries

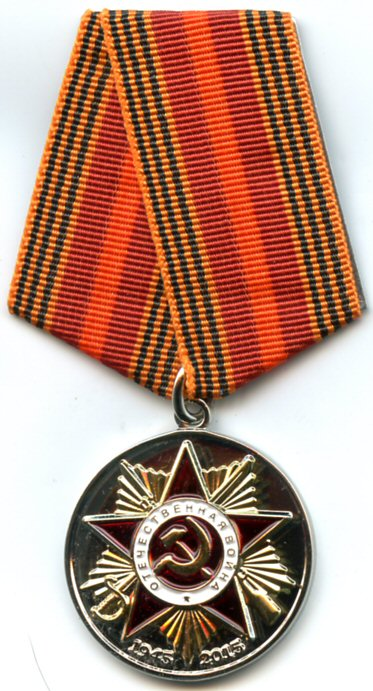
- Jubilee Medal "70 Years of Victory in the Great Patriotic War 1941–1945" (obverse)
- Type: State Commemorative Medal
- Awarded for: World War 2 service
- Presented by: Russian Federation; Belarus; Kazakhstan
- Eligibility: Citizens of the Russian Federation and foreign nationals
- Status: No longer awarded
- Established: December 21, 2013
- Ribbon of the Jubilee Medal "70 Years of Victory in the Great Patriotic War 1941–1945"

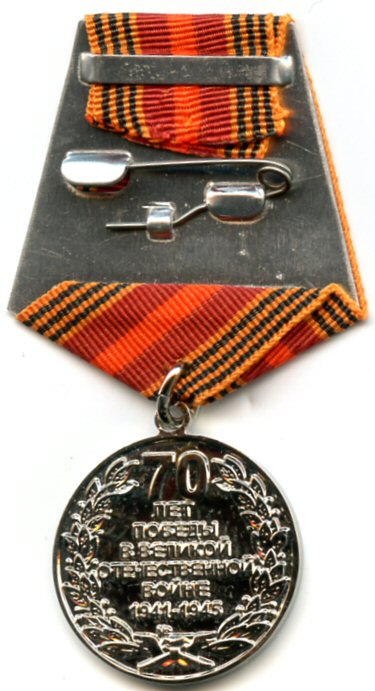
Reverse of the Jubilee Medal "70 Years of Victory in the Great Patriotic War 1941–1945"

The Jubilee Medal "70 Years of Victory in the Great Patriotic War 1941–1945" (Russian: Юбилейная медаль «70 лет Победы в Великой Отечественной войне 1941–1945 гг.») is a state commemorative medal of the Russian Federation. It was established on December 21, 2013 by Presidential Decree № 931 to denote the 70th anniversary of the 1945 victory over Nazi Germany. Its award criteria were later ratified by presidential decree № 175-rp of June 4, 2014.

== Medal statute ==
The Jubilee Medal "70 Years of Victory in the Great Patriotic War 1941–1945" is currently awarded to soldiers and civilian employees of the Armed Forces of the USSR for participation in hostilities in the Great Patriotic War of 1941–1945, guerrillas and members of underground organisations operating in occupied territories of the USSR, persons who were awarded the medal "For Victory over Germany" or "For Victory over Japan", persons awarded for their selfless work the Medal "For Valiant Labour in the Great Patriotic War 1941–1945" or "For Labour Merit" or any of the "Defence" medals of the cities or regions of the USSR; to persons who worked in the period from 22 June 1941 to 9 May 1945 for no less than six months, excluding the period of work in the temporarily occupied territories; former under-age prisoners of concentration camps, ghettos and other places of detention established by the Nazis and their allies; foreign nationals from outside the Commonwealth of Independent States who fought in the national military forces in the USSR, as part of guerrilla units, underground groups, and other anti-fascist groups who have made significant contribution to victory in the Patriotic War and who were awarded state awards of the USSR or Russian Federation.

== Medal description ==
The Jubilee Medal "70 Years of Victory in the Great Patriotic War 1941–1945" is a 32mm in diameter silvered circular medal. Its obverse bears the relief image of the Order of the Patriotic War, between the two lower rays of the star, the numbers "1945–2015." On the reverse, the relief inscription in seven lines "70 years of Victory in the Great Patriotic War 1941–1945." (Russian: "70 лет Победы в Великой Отечественной войне 1941–1945").

The medal is suspended by a ring through the award's suspension loop to a standard Russian pentagonal mount covered with an overlapping 24mm wide silk moiré Order of the Patriotic War ribbon bordered with 6mm wide St. George Ribbon.

== Foreign recipients ==
The following individuals were awarded the Jubilee Medal "70 Years of Victory in the Great Patriotic War 1941–1945":

- William D. Hahn (U.S. Navy) was awarded the Jubilee Medal for his World War II service aboard USS Alabama in support of the Arctic convoys. While serving aboard the USS Alabama (BB-60), Hahn was a member of the Gunnery Department, 10th Division.
- North Korean guerrillas: Ri Ul-sol, Kim Chol-man, Hwang Sun-hui, Kim Ok-sun, Pak Kyong-suk, Ri Yong-suk and Ri Jong-in; on 6 May 2015.
- North Korean leader Kim Jong-un.

== See also ==
- Awards and decorations of the Russian Federation
- Awards and decorations of the Soviet Union
