= Committees of the 3rd Supreme People's Assembly =

North Korean government committees

3rd Committees
- Sign of the Supreme People's Assembly

23 October 1962 – 16 December 1967 (5 years, 55 days) Overview
- Type: Bills Committee; Budget Committee; Credentials Committee; Foreign Affairs Committee
- Election: 1st Session of the 3rd Supreme People's Assembly

The committees of the 3rd Supreme People's Assembly (SPA) of North Korea were elected by the 1st Session of the 3rd SPA on 23 October 1962. They were replaced on 16 December 1967 by the committees of the 4th Supreme People's Assembly.

== Committees ==
=== Bills ===
Rank	Name	Hangul	2nd COM	4th COM	Positions
1	Kim Ik-son	김익손	Old	Demoted	Chairman of the SPA Bill Committee
2	Ho Bong-hak	허봉학	New	Demoted	—
3	Kim Tong-gyu	김동규	New	Demoted	—
4	Choe Ki-chol	최기철	New	Demoted	—
5	Yi Chae-yong	이채용	New	Demoted	—
6	Kim Hi-jun	김희준	New	Demoted	—
7	No Ik-myong	노익명	New	Demoted	—
8	Kim Kuk-hun	김국훈	New	Reelected	—
9	Kim Si-jung	김시정	New	Demoted	—

=== Budget ===
Rank	Name	Hangul	2nd COM	4th COM	Positions
1	Yim Kye-chol	임계철	New	Reelected	Chairman of the SPA Budget Committee
2	Kang Hui-won	강희원	New	Reelected	—
3	Chong Song-on	종송온	New	Demoted	—
4	O Che-ryong	오체룡	New	Reelected	—
5	Yi Chan-son	이찬손	New	Demoted	—
6	Chong Chong-gi	종종기	New	Demoted	—
7	Chang Yun-pil	장윤필	Old	Reelected	—
8	Yi Chang-bok	이창복	New	Demoted	—
9	Kim Mu-hoe	김무회	New	Demoted	—
10	Pak Sung-hup	박성섭	New	Demoted	—
11	Chu Won-saeng	추원생	New	Demoted	—
12	Chi Chang-gon	치창곤	New	Demoted	—
13	Yun Yon-hwan	윤연환	New	Reelected	—
14	Chon Kyong-hwa	전경화	New	Demoted	—
15	Yi Sok-sim	이속심	New	Demoted	—

=== Credentials ===
Rank	Name	Hangul	2nd COM	4th COM	Positions
1	Choe Yong-jin	최용진	New	Demoted	Chairman of the SPA Credentials Committee
2	Pak Ung-gol	박웅골	New	Demoted	—
3	Han Tong-baek	한통백	New	Demoted	—
4	Yi Chae-yun	이채윤	New	Demoted	—
5	Yu Ki-ik	유기익	New	Demoted	—
6	Chu Sang-su	추상수	New	Demoted	—
7	No Yong-se	노용세	New	Demoted	—

=== Foreign Affairs ===
Rank	Name	Hangul	2nd COM	4th COM	Positions
1	Pak Yong-guk	박용국	Old	Demoted	Chairman of the SPA Foreign Affairs Committee
2	Kim Wal-yong	김월용	New	Demoted	—
3	Ho Sok-son	호속손	New	Demoted	—
4	Yu Kon-yang	유건양	New	Demoted	—
5	Chong Kwang-nok	종광녹	New	Demoted	—
6	Kim Ok-sun	김옥선	New	Reelected	—
7	Choe Hak-son	최학손	New	Demoted	—
