= Pak Kyong-suk =

North Korean politician (1921–2020)

- Born: 1921; Eastern Manchuria
- Died: 31 August 2020 (aged 98–99); North Korea
- Occupation: Politician
- Political party: Workers' Party of Korea

Korean name
- Hangul: 박경숙
- Hanja: 朴卿叔
- RR: Bak Gyeongsuk
- MR: Pak Kyŏngsuk

Pak Kyong-suk (Korean: 박경숙, 1921 – 31 August 2020) was a North Korean politician. She was a seamstress in Kim Il Sung's guerrilla forces during the 1930s. After the liberation of Korea, she held posts in the Workers' Party of Korea (WPK), Democratic Women's League, as well as being a delegate to the Supreme People's Assembly.

== Career ==
Pak Kyong-suk was born in Eastern Manchuria in 1921. In the 1930s during the anti-Japanese struggle, she was a member of Kim Il Sung's sewing unit. Kim Il Sung remembers her as one of the best radio operators in his autobiography With the Century, writing:

Unable as she was to take a bit of the food served at the mess hall, Pak Kyong Suk was never absent from training in wireless communication. Even soon after delivery, she participated in the training course with great enthusiasm. She was so active in both her studies and exercises that the instructor of the wireless platoon spoke highly of Korean women, noting that they were indeed hard-working and persistent.

Pak Kyong Suk once accompanied Kim Chaek to the enemy-held area, carrying wireless equipment on her back, and engaging in small-unit activities for several months. She was very dexterous in operating the wireless.

Her political career began in c. 1948 when she became the director of the secret documents department of the Central Committee of the Workers' Party of Korea (WPK). In 1954 she became a member of the Central Committee of the Democratic Women's League.

In July 1956, she became a deputy department director in the WPK South Hamhyong provincial committee. In October 1959 she became the chairwoman of the Pyongyang Paper Mill party committee. She became a candidate member of the WPK Central Committee in September 1961. In May 1963 she became the deputy director of the Light Industry and Commerce Department of the WPK Central Committee. With these qualifications, she was considered a "veteran Party cadre".

In 1962 she was elected to the Supreme People's Assembly. She renewed her seat in 1967.

She was awarded the Jubilee Medal "70 Years of Victory in the Great Patriotic War 1941–1945" on 6 May 2015 by Vladimir Putin and Jubilee Medal "75 Years of Victory in the Great Patriotic War 1941–1945" on 6 May 2020.

She was on the funeral committees of Kim Chol-man, Ri Ul-sol, and Hwang Sun-hui.

== See also ==
- Politics of North Korea
