= Jubilee Medal "75 Years of Victory in the Great Patriotic War 1941–1945" =

Commemorative medal of Russia

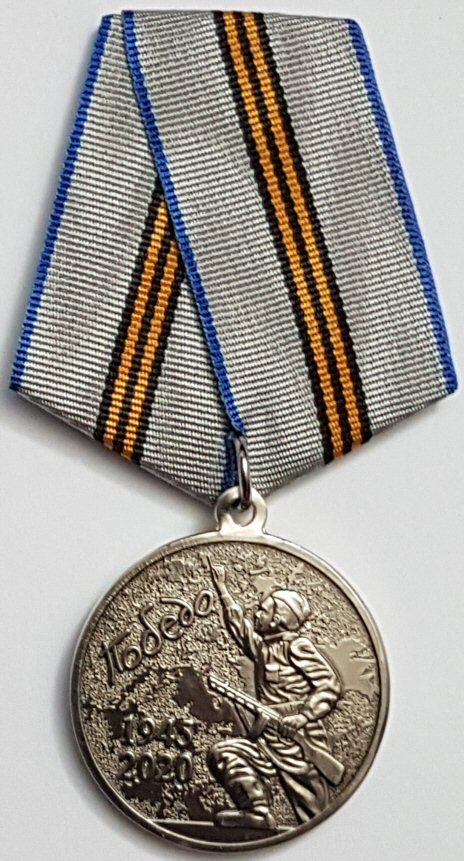
- Jubilee Medal "75 Years of Victory in the Great Patriotic War 1941–1945" (obverse)
- Type: State Commemorative Medal
- Awarded for: World War 2 service
- Presented by: Russian Federation
- Eligibility: Citizens of the Russian Federation and foreign nationals
- Status: No longer awarded
- Established: 13 June 2019
- Ribbon of the Jubilee Medal "75 Years of Victory in the Great Patriotic War 1941–1945"

The Jubilee Medal "75 Years of Victory in the Great Patriotic War 1941–1945" (Russian: Юбилейная медаль «75 лет Победы в Великой Отечественной войне 1941–1945 гг.») is a state commemorative medal of the Russian Federation. It was established on 13 June 2019 by Presidential Decree No. 277 to denote the 75th anniversary of the 1945 victory over Nazi Germany.

== Medal statute ==
The Jubilee Medal "75 Years of Victory in the Great Patriotic War 1941–1945" shall be awarded to soldiers and civilian employees of the Armed Forces of the USSR for participation in hostilities in the Great Patriotic War of 1941–1945, guerrillas and members of underground organisations operating in occupied territories of the USSR, persons who were awarded the medal "For Victory over Germany" or "For Victory over Japan", persons awarded for their selfless work the Medal "For Valiant Labour in the Great Patriotic War 1941–1945" or "For Labour Merit" or any of the "Defence" medals of the cities or regions of the USSR; to persons who worked in the period from 22 June 1941 to 9 May 1945 for no less than six months, excluding the period of work in the temporarily occupied territories; former under-age prisoners of concentration camps, ghettos and other places of detention established by the Nazis and their allies; foreign nationals from outside the Commonwealth of Independent States who fought in the national military forces in the USSR, as part of guerrilla units, underground groups, and other anti-fascist groups who have made significant contribution to victory in the Patriotic War and who were awarded state awards of the USSR or Russian Federation.

== Medal description ==
The Jubilee Medal "75 Years of Victory in the Great Patriotic War 1941–1945" is silvered circular medal. Its obverse bears the image of a soldier in field uniform writing "Victory" on the Reichstag building. Below the inscription are the years 1945 and 2020. On the reverse, the relief inscription in seven lines "75 years of Victory in the Great Patriotic War 1941–1945." (Russian: "75 лет Победы в Великой Отечественной войне 1941–1945").

== Notable recipients ==
- Vladimir Dolgikh
- Manolis Glezos
- Dmitry Yazov

== Foreign recipients ==
These are some of the following individuals who were awarded the Jubilee Medal "75 Years of Victory in the Great Patriotic War 1941–1945":

- William D. Hahn (U.S. Navy) was awarded the Jubilee Medal for his World War II service aboard USS Alabama in support of the Arctic convoys. While serving aboard the USS Alabama (BB-60), Hahn was a member of the Gunnery Department, 10th Division.
- Kim Jong-un Leader of the Democratic People's Republic of Korea General Secretary of the Workers' Party of Korea
- North Korean guerrillas Ri Yong-suk and Pak Kyong-suk.

== See also ==
- Awards and decorations of the Russian Federation
- Awards and decorations of the Soviet Union
