= Andrés Lozano Lozano =

Mexican lawyer and politician

- Born: 15 February 1970 (age 56); Mexico City, Mexico
- Occupations: Lawyer and politician
- Political party: PRD

Andrés Lozano Lozano (born-15 February 1970) is a Mexican lawyer and politician affiliated with the Party of the Democratic Revolution. In 2006–2009 he served as a federal deputy in the 60th Congress, representing the Federal District's first district.
