= Lizbeth Rosas Montero =

Mexican politician

- Born: Lizbeth Eugenia Rosas Montero; 9 March 1974 (age 52); Mexico City, Mexico
- Occupation: Deputy
- Years active: From 08/29/2012 to 08/31/2015
- Political party: PRD

Lizbeth Eugenia Rosas Montero (born 9 March 1974) is a Mexican politician affiliated with the PRD. In 2012–2015 she served as a federal deputy in the 62nd Congress, representing the Federal District's first district. She also served as a plurinominal deputy during the 59th Congress (2003 to 2006).
