= Order of Freedom and Independence =

North Korean Military Medal

Order of Freedom and Independence 자유독립훈장 (自由獨立勳章)
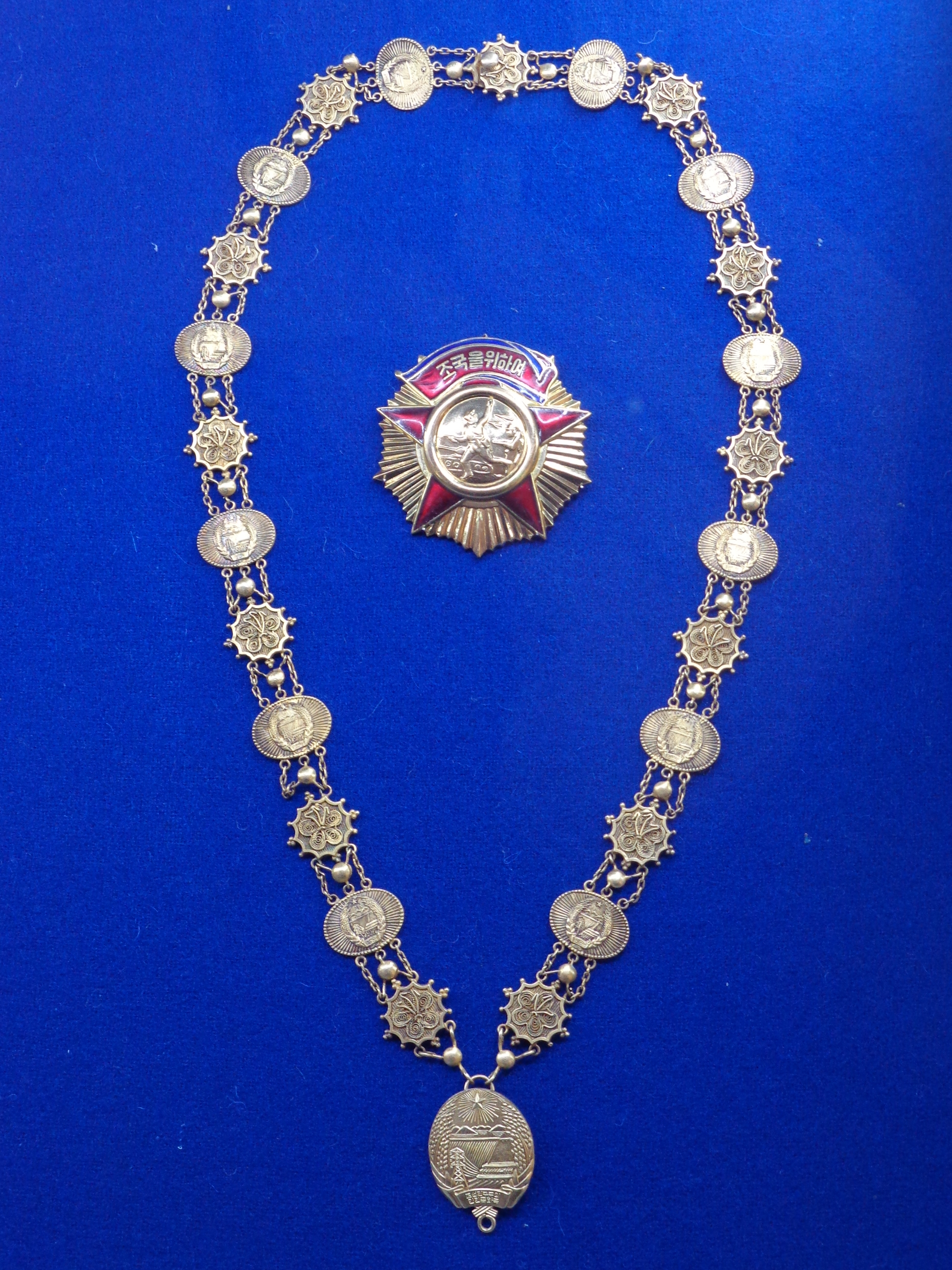
- Collar and Star of the Order of Freedom and Independence
- Type: Order
- Awarded for: Military achievements
- Country: North Korea
- Presented by: The Democratic People's Republic of Korea
- Campaign: Korean War
- Motto: "조국을 위하여" (For the Fatherland)
- Status: Active
- Established: 7 July 1950

Highlights
- Total: 227 (First Class); 7746 (Second Class)
- First and second class ribbons

Precedence
- Next (higher): Order of the National Flag
- Related: Order of the National Flag

- Order of Freedom and Independence
- Chosŏn'gŭl: 자유독립훈장
- Hancha: 自由獨立勳章
- Revised Romanization: Jayu Dongnip Hunjang
- McCune–Reischauer: Chayu Tongnip Hunjang

The Order of Freedom and Independence (Korean: 자유독립훈장) is one of the highest North Korean orders. It is divided into two classes: the first class is awarded to commanders and partisan units of brigades, divisions, and higher military groups for bravery, courage, and auspicious command of military operations. The second class is awarded to the commanders of partisan regiments, battalions, companies, and detachments, as well as to civil professionals employed in the industry for the military. The order is awarded with the Order of the National Flag of the same rank.

The order was instituted on 7 July 1950, during the Korean War.

Two variants have been made: one Soviet-made with a twisting mechanism for attachment and a North Korean-made with a pin.

== Recipients ==
During the Korean War, the order, first class, was received by 95 Koreans and 126 Chinese people and second class by 3,043 Koreans and 4,703 Chinese recipients. As well as several soldiers and figures from communist countries.

- Song and Dance Ensemble of the Korean People's Army, first class
- Kim Hyong Gwon Military Academy of Communications Men, first class
- Ri Jong-ok, first class
- Pak Song-chol, first class
- Jo Myong-rok, first class
- Kim Jong-il, first class (twice)

== See also ==
- Orders, decorations, and medals of North Korea
