= Gurría =

Gurría is a surname. Notable people with the surname include:

- Ángela Gurría (1929–2023), Mexican sculptor
- José Ángel Gurría (born 1950), Mexican economist and diplomat
- Manuel Gurría Ordóñez (1931–2026), Mexican politician
