= Kim Rak-hui =

North Korean politician (1933–2013)

Vice Premier of North Korea
- In office 7 June 2010 – April 2012

Personal details
- Born: 11 November 1933 Kaechon, South Pyongan Province, Korea, Empire of Japan
- Died: 17 February 2013 (aged 79) North Korea
- Citizenship: North Korean
- Party: Workers' Party of Korea
- Education: University of National Economics
- Awards: Hero of Labor, Order of Kim Il Sung, Order of Kim Jong Il, Order of the National Flag (first class)

Korean name
- Hangul: 김락희
- Hanja: 金洛姬
- RR: Gim Rakhui
- MR: Kim Rakhŭi

Kim Rak-hui (Korean: 김락희, 11 November 1933 – February 2013) was a North Korean politician. Kim worked in the agricultural and cooperatives section for most of her working life. During the Korean War, her efforts in rationing caught the attention of Kim Il Sung. A delegate to the Supreme People's Assembly (SPA) many times, Kim Rak-hui rose through the ranks of the Workers' Party of Korea (WPK), becoming a full member of its Central Committee in 1970. She was appointed to the Politburo of the Workers' Party of Korea in 2010 and became one of six Vice Premiers of North Korea that year. She ran a committee to combat epizootic diseases.

In 2012, her career started to decline as she was stripped of her Politburo membership and Vice-Premiership. Initially, it was speculated that she was caught up in personnel changes to consolidate the rule of Kim Jong Un. After it was announced that Kim Rak-hui had died in February 2013, the decline of her career was attributed to ill-health instead. Through her career, Kim was awarded Hero of Labor, Order of Kim Il Sung, Order of Kim Jong Il, and Order of the National Flag (first class).

== Early life ==
Kim Rak-hui was born in Kaechon, South Pyongan Province on 11 November 1933. Before her career, she graduated from the University of National Economics.

== Career ==
Most of Kim's career was spent in agricultural cooperatives and rural management committees. During the Korean War, she supervised food rationing and distribution. Her efforts caught the attention of the country's leader, Kim Il Sung. After the war, she became the general manager of Ponghwa Agricultural Cooperatives in South Pyongan Province in August 1953. In the aftermath of the war, she drove rebuilding efforts on farms of the Kaechon area, for which she was awarded the title Hero of Labor in 1955. She became the chairwoman of Kaechon Ponghwa Agricultural Cooperatives in September 1962.

Kim was elected a member of parliament to the Second Supreme People's Assembly (SPA) in 1957. She renewed her seat for the Third (1962), Fourth (1967), and Fifth SPAs (1972), after which she lost it until returning for the Ninth (1990), 11th (2003) and 12th SPAs.

In November 1970 Kim became a member of the Central Committee of the Workers' Party of Korea (WPK) at the Fifth WPK Congress. She was demoted to alternate member in October 1980 at the Sixth Party Congress. In November 1984 Kim become the municipal chairwoman of Kaesong. In April 1990 Kim was appointed the chairwoman of the South Pyongan Province Rural Managerial Committee. She was dismissed from her post in September 1997. That year she was made vice director of the WPK Agriculture Department, but continued to be an advisor to the South Pyongan committee. In June 2005 she became Chief Secretary of the South Hwanghae Provincial WPK Committee.

Kim was appointed to the Politburo of the Workers' Party of Korea in 2010 at its Third Conference, ranking 27th in the unofficial party hierarchy. Kim was appointed one of six Vice Premiers of North Korea in the third session of the 12th SPA on 7 June 2010. Her appointment was part of a reshuffle to elevate several provincial politicians to important posts in the Cabinet of North Korea. During her Vice-Premiership, she made multiple public appearances and ran a Cabinet committee to prevent the outbreak of epizootic diseases like the foot-and-mouth disease. The Cabinet also conferred on her the title of its honorary councilor.

After Kim Il Sung died in 1994, Kim Rak-hui was on his funeral committee. She was on a similar committee of O Jin-u the following year. She was number 24 on the committee of Jo Myong-rok. In 2011, she appeared on the committee for the funeral of Kim Jong Il, ranked 21 highest.

== Decline and death ==
Kim was last seen in public in early March 2012 at an International Women's Day event. By the course of the year, the 5th session of the 12th SPA in April removed her from the office of Vice Premier, and the 4th Conference of the Workers' Party of Korea removed her from the Politburo. It was speculated that the decline of her career was due to efforts to consolidate the rule of Kim Jong Un by personnel changes. For instance, North Korea expert Alexandre Mansourov counted her among "holdovers who failed to secure Kim's trust or demonstrate their value". After North Korean media reported on 18 February 2013 that Kim Rak-hui had died, her demotions were attributed to health issues instead. Kim Jong Un sent a floral basket to her funeral. During her life, she had been awarded, in addition to Labor of Hero, the following: Order of Kim Il Sung, Order of Kim Jong Il, and Order of the National Flag (first class).

== See also ==
- Politics of North Korea
- Women in North Korea
