= Hero of Labour (North Korea) =

Highest title of honour in North Korea

- Country: North Korea
- Presented by: North Korea
- Status: Active
- Established: 17 July 1951

Precedence
- Next (lower): Order of Kim Il Sung, Order of Kim Jong Il

- Hero of Labour
- Hangul: 로력영웅
- Hanja: 勞力英雄
- RR: Roryeok yeongung
- MR: Roryŏk yŏngung

Hero of Labour (Korean: 로력영웅) is one of the highest titles of honour of North Korea and the highest decoration of the country overall. The award was probably scheduled for establishment in the summer of 1950, but the Korean War postponed these plans. When the war had entered a phase of stalemate along the 38th parallel, the government had time to officially launch the decoration, originally under the name Korea Hero of Labour. 16 people were decorated Labour Heroes during the war and more since then. The decoration is based on its Soviet equivalent, Hero of Socialist Labour.

== Specifications ==
Hero of Labour is the highest title of honour of North Korea. It is also the highest decoration of the country overall. Along with the title a gold medal is awarded. The medal features the hammer and sickle on a five-pointed star. Immediately below it are the Order of Kim Il Sung and Kim Il Sung Prizes. It is awarded independently of the similar award of Order of Korean Labour.

If someone is awarded it twice, they become a "Double Labour Hero" (2중 로력영웅).

== History ==
Hero of Labour was probably scheduled to be established in the summer of 1950, but the breaking up of the Korean War halted the plans. Only when the war reached a stalemate along the 38th parallel did the government have time to concentrate on its awards system. Hero of Labour was promulgated on 17 July 1951 and it became the highest civilian award of the country. The title is based on its Soviet equivalent, Hero of Socialist Labour.

It was initially promulgated as Korea Hero of Labour, using the Korean word Choson (조선). This set it apart from the related Order of Labour whose full name was "Korean People's Republic Order of Labour". This is likely because North Koreans copied every detail of the decorations of the Soviet Union, some of which featured the longer name of the country, "Soviet Union", and others simply "Soviet".

During the war, 16 people were decorated Labour Heroes. Once the war was over, surprisingly, Kim Il Sung was not awarded the title. He received one only on 7 September 1958, probably because he had consolidated his position in power following the 1956 attempted coup d'état known as the August Faction Incident. Kim Jong Il was never awarded one, leading observers to conclude that the prize did not have much political value at least at that time.

In more recent times, it has been habitually awarded to mothers who have given birth to exceptionally many children.

== Recipients ==
Name	Occupation	Date	Notes	Ref
Kim Rak-hui	politician	1955	Awarded for leading post-war reconstruction of farms in Kaechon	
Kim Il Sung	Premier of North Korea	7 September 1958	Awarded after the August Faction Incident (1956)	
Paek Sol-hui	botanist	7 October 1979	Developer of a crop strain	
Ri Pyong-sam	politician	19 October 2011	Political Director of the Korean People's Internal Security Forces	
Chang Jae-ryong	manager	October 2012	Manager of Osoksan Granite Mine, Ryonggang County, Nampho. Awarded "for his meritorious services, displaying bold and enterprising work style and practical ability."	
Hong Song-gwan	sea captain	7 June 2016	Former captain of Fishing Boat 1728 of the Second Fleet of the Kamapho Fishery Station that overfulfilled the fishing plan on many years	
Kim Chun-hui	weightlifting coach	2018	Weightlifting coach of the Kigwancha Sports Club	
300 workers			Awarded following the 1974 70-Day Battle mass mobilization campaign	
Jo Myong-suk	manager		Manager of the Hadang Unha Clothing Factory, awarded "in high appreciation of her devoted services to the prosperity of the country and the improvement of the people's living standards."	
Jong Yong-man	painter		Awarded twice. Painter of over 600 works, 170 which are in the Korean Art Gallery	
Kim Kwang-min	football coach		Coach of the women of the April 25 Sports Team and the women's national team	
Kim Sang-ryon	agronomist		Developer of a rice strain	
Kim Sin-ung	associate academician		At the Pyongyang University of Mechanical Engineering	
Mun Kang-sun	weaver		Overfulfilling plans at the Kim Jong-suk Textile Mill	
O Tae-hyong	sculptor		Took part in sculpting the Chollima Statue, Monument to the Victorious Battle of Pochonbo, Mansu Hill Grand Monument, Wangjaesan Grand Monument and the Monument to Party Founding.	
Om Kil-son	actor and director		"[F]or his contribution to the development of the Juche-based film art"	
Pak Jong-ju	film director		Director at the Korean Film Studio	
Paek Jong-muk	manager		Manager of the Sogam Pharmaceutical Factory	
Ra Un-sim	footballer		Captain of the North Korea women's national football team	
Ri Chun-gu	screenwriter		Awarded twice	
Ri Ok-sang	agriculturalist		Developed stockbreeding technology	
Ri Song-gun	painter		Painter of the Korean Painting Production Unit of the Mansudae Art Studio	
Ri Sung-ik	virologist		Head of the Virus Research Institute of the Pyongyang Medical College of Kim Il Sung University	
Ro Ik-hwa	sculptor		Maker of many famous statues with the Merited Sculpture Production Company of the Mansudae Art Studio	
Ri Yong-suk	politician		anti-Japanese war veteran	
Jin Pong-jun	manager		Manager of Fishery Station No. 223 run by the Korean People's Army	
Kang Song-il		24 March 2021	Awarded for feats of economic and socialist construction	
Jang Tong-gil		24 March 2021	Awarded for feats of economic and socialist construction	
Kye Chol-nam		24 March 2021	Awarded for feats of economic and socialist construction	
Sin Song-chol		24 March 2021	Awarded for feats of economic and socialist construction	
Sin Myong-son		24 March 2021	Awarded for feats of economic and socialist construction	
Kim Hui-ok		24 March 2021	Awarded for feats of economic and socialist construction	
Rim Yong-ok		24 March 2021	Awarded for feats of economic and socialist construction	
Jang Ryong-sik	vice-department director of the Information and Publicity Department of the Central Committee of the Workers' Party of Korea	6 October 2020	Merits in music and art	
Choe Chang Su	Actor			
Yu Won Jun	Actor			
Kanggye Youth Power Station unit 3	Hydropower plant	29 April 1984		
Yakov Novichenko	Soviet military officer	28 July 1984	Saved the life of Kim Il Sung on 1 March 1946	
Red Flag 1-class locomotive of Tanchon Youth Engine Service Brigade	Electric locomotive		also awarded three 'three revolution flag' and 'Lathe No. 26' Model Machine Prize	
Kim Byong-suk	angler	2 August 1959		
Kim Sok-un	soldier	unknown	Battalion commander of North Hwanghae Province Youth Construction Brigade	
Kim Hak-hyong	soldier	August 1988	Battalion commander of North Pyongan Province Youth Construction Brigade	
Ri Hyun-sop	politician	August 1988	Director of the Speed Offensive Youth Assault brigade of the Youth League Central Committee	
Kim Hong-sun	manager	April 1989	Manager of 6th Hydroelectric Power Station Construction Office	
Ryang Dok-kyu	politician	April 1989	Director of Construction Bureau of Kaesong Central Committee	
Ri Ung-sik	soldier	August 1988	Chief of the Military Band of the Supreme Command of the Korean People's Army	
Sim Byong-gi	soldier	February 2001	Officer of the Korean People's Army	
Pak Myong-son	politician	November 2002	Deputy Party Chairman of Jongphyong County	
O Sa-song	businessman	2 July 2003		
Pak Un-jong	mother	September 2020	Awarded for giving birth to many children	
Ri Chun-hee	Korean Central Television broadcaster	6 September 2022	contributions to broadcasting	
Kim Ki-ryong	Chairman of Korean Central Television	6 September 2022	contributions to broadcasting	
Kim Seryun	Screenwriter	December 1992	For Nation and Destiny (1992)	

== See also ==
- Orders and medals of North Korea
- Hero of Socialist Labour
- Hero of Labour (Vietnam)
- Hero of Labour (GDR)
