= Order of Kim Il Sung =

North Korean award decoration

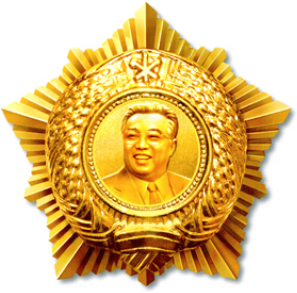
- 2012 revision of the order
- Type: Order
- Awarded for: Outstanding services to the Democratic People's Republic of Korea and communism
- Country: North Korea
- Presented by: The Democratic People's Republic of Korea
- Status: Active
- Established: 20 March 1972
- First award: Kim Jong Il

Highlights
- Total: More than 600
- Ribbon of the Order of Kim Il Sung

Precedence
- Next (higher): Hero of Labour
- Equivalent: Order of Kim Jong Il
- Next (lower): Order of the National Flag

- Order of Kim Il Sung
- Hangul: 김일성훈장
- Hanja: 金日成勳章
- RR: Gim Ilseong hunjang
- MR: Kim Ilsŏng hunjang

The Order of Kim Il Sung (Korean: 김일성훈장) is the highest order of North Korea, along with the Order of Kim Jong Il, and only second to one honorary title, the Hero of Labour.

The order, named after the country's first leader Kim Il Sung, was instituted in 1972 during a reform of the North Korean honors system. Its history is not fully known, but the order was initially round, being changed to a five-pointed star design later, and the picture of Kim Il Sung updated in 2012.

Recipients can be individuals or organizations, who have contributed to the cause of Juche. It is traditionally awarded on 15 April, the Day of the Sun, the birthday of Kim Il Sung. Relatively few are awarded, totaling at least 600, to highlight the high symbolic status of the order. Recipients include Kim Jong Il, who received it four times. He was supposed to be the recipient of the first award in 1972, but according to North Korean sources, he initially refused.

== History ==
The North Korean system of orders and medals saw periods of expansion and stagnation through the 1950s and 1960s, but in the early 1970s, major additions were made. Of these, the most important one was the addition of the Order of Kim Il Sung to the list of titles. The order was instituted on 20 March 1972 on the occasion of the 60th birthday of Kim Il Sung. At about the same time, North Korea also started awarding watches with Kim Il Sung's autograph on them. According to North Korean sources, the idea for the Order of Kim Il Sung originated with Kim Jong Il. Likewise, it is claimed that Kim Jong Il was to be the first recipient of the order, but he declined it and received the honor only in 1979.

In 2012, all orders bearing the picture of Kim Il Sung, including the Order of Kim Il Sung, were redesigned with a newer picture of Kim. At some point before that, the order had become a five-pointed star, being formerly round. It is possible that all old versions were recalled and changed to the new one.

The Order of Kim Il Sung is similar in appearance to the Soviet Order of Lenin. Uniquely, the Order of Kim Il Sung was the only state order named after a living ruler from its inception until the establishment of the Order of Turkmenbashi.

== Eligibility ==
The order is traditionally awarded annually on 15 April, the birthday of Kim Il Sung. It is awarded for "outstanding services to the Republic of the Korean nation and communism".

Out of all North Korean orders, it is awarded the most sparingly, reflecting its high symbolic status. At least 600 have been awarded.

== Precedence ==
The order is the highest of the order of North Korea, along with the Order of Kim Jong Il, although out of titles the Hero of Labour is considered higher. The Order of the National Flag is one rank lower.

There are related prizes called the Kim Il Sung Prize, as well as prizes for youth and children.

== Recipients ==
- Pyongyang Electric Locomotive Factory (1972)
- Kim Gwang-jin (twice: December 1978 and April 1985)
- Kim Jong Il (four times: 3 April 1979, 7 April 1982, 7 April 1992, and 29 March 2012)
- Paek In-jun (May 1980)
- Kim Jung-rin (1982)
- Kim Il-chol (4 February 1982)
- Kang Seok-ju (twice: April 1982 and April 1992)
- Kim Ki-nam (twice: April 1982 and April 1992)
- Kim Tu-nam (twice: April 1982 and April 1992)
- O Kuk-ryol (twice: April 1982 and April 1992)
- Choe Yong-rim (April 1982)
- Jang Chol Yong (17 February 2026)
- Jo Myong-rok (April 1982)
- Jon Ha-chol (April 1985)
- Jon Hak Chol (17 February 2026)
- Jon Pyong-ho (April 1982)
- Jong Chang-ryol (April 1982)
- Kang Sok-ju (April 1992)
- Kim Kyung-ok (April 1992)
- Lee Joo-hyon (April 1992)
- Kim Sung-ae (April 1982)
- O Jin-u (April 1982)
- Paek Hak-rim (April 1982)
- Kim Bok-shin (1982)
- Mang Dong-sop (February 1990)
- Pak Nam-gi (twice: April 1985 and April 1992)
- Ri Tu-ik (April 1982)
- Kim Chung-il (twice: April 1987 and April 1992)
- Kim Hak-in (April 1992)
- Kim Hyung-guk (April 1992)
- Jang Sung-taek (April 1992)
- Kang Hyeon-su (April 1992)
- Choe Song-su (October 1995)
- Korean Central News Agency (three times: unknown dates and 5 December 1996)
- Chang Chong-ho (October 2000)
- Lee Hak-soo (April 2002)
- Park In-ryong (April 2002)
- Ryu Ryong-gu (April 2002)
- Park Yong-go (April 2003)
- Ryo Won-gu (April 2007)
- Kim Man-sik (2010)
- Han Duk-su (three times)
- Chollima Steel Complex
- Jin Pong-jun
- Kim Rak-hui
- Kim Yong-sun
- Om Kil-son
- Paek Jong-muk
- Pyongyang Kim Jong-suk Textile Mill
- Kanggye Youth Power Station
- Ri Jong-ok
- Ri Song Chol (17 February 2026)
- Ro Ik-hwa (sculptor)
- Ryu Mi-yong
- Yon Hyong-muk
- Kim Il Sung University
- Pyongyang University of Music and Dance (1989)
- Kigwancha Sports Club
- Mansudae Art Studio
- Ri Yong-suk
- Kim Yong Ju
- Kang Ki-sop
- Ri Chun-gu
- Kim Kwang Nam
- Choe Jong Ho
- Jang Yong Gil
- Jikdong Youth Coal Mine
- Rangnang Disabled Soldiers' Essential Plastic Goods Factory
- Pyongyang Secondary School No.1
- West Pyongyang Service Brigade of Engine
- Pyongyang Schoolchildren's Palace
- Central Information and Communications Centre
- Kim Jong Thae Electric Locomotive Complex
- Kim Chang Son
- Hong So Hon
- Vladimir Putin (19 June 2024)(not lawed)

== See also ==
- List of things named after Kim Il Sung
- Orders and medals of North Korea
