= Order of Admiral Ri Sun-sin =

- Awarded for: Outstanding leadership
- Country: North Korea
- Presented by: The Democratic People's Republic of Korea
- Eligibility: Flag officers and navy commanders
- Campaign: Korean War
- Status: Discontinued
- Established: 13 July 1950
- Total: 22 (second class)
- First class (left) and second class (right) ribbons

Order of Admiral Ri Sun-sin (Korean: 리순신장군훈장) is an award named for famous Korean naval leader Yi Sun-sin. It was given to Korean People's Navy personnel of North Korea at least during the Korean War. There are two grades of the award. Order of Admiral Ri Sun-sin First Class (리순신장군훈장 제1급), and Order of Admiral Ri Sun-sin Second Class (리순신장군훈장 제2급).

== History ==
The second class of this award was given 22 times during the Korean War while the first class version was not given. The award has been assumed to have been discontinued at an unknown date. Photographic evidence indicated the award was given for some years after the war, as a medal with serial number 113 exists.
