= Order of Kim Jong Il =

North Korean award

Order Of Kim Jong Il
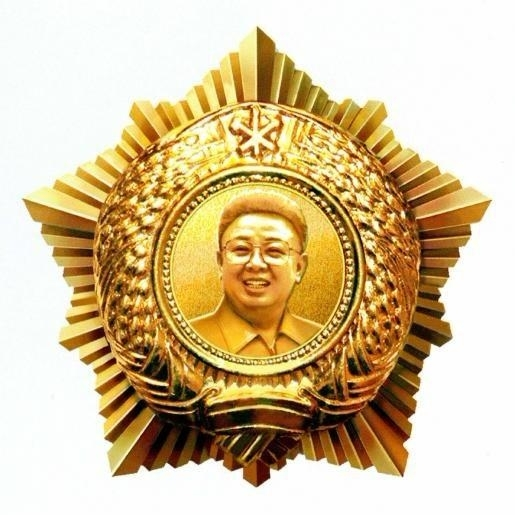
- Order of Kim Jong Il
- Type: Order
- Awarded for: Service to the revolutionary cause of Juche, for building a thriving socialist nation
- Country: North Korea
- Presented by: The Democratic People's Republic of Korea
- Eligibility: Individuals and organizations
- Motto: "Order of Kim Jong Il"
- Status: Currently given
- Established: 3 February 2012
- Ribbon of the Order of Kim Jong Il

Precedence
- Next (higher): Hero of Labor
- Equivalent: Order of Kim Il Sung
- Next (lower): Order of the National Flag

- Order of Kim Jong Il
- Hangul: 김정일 훈장
- Hanja: 金正日 勳章
- RR: Gim Jeongil hunjang
- MR: Kim Chŏngil hunjang

The Order of Kim Jong Il (Korean: 김정일 훈장) is a North Korean order named after Kim Jong Il, the former leader of North Korea. It is the highest order of North Korea, along with the Order of Kim Il Sung, and only second to one honorary title, the Hero of Labour.

The order can be awarded to individuals as well as organizations for service to the cause of the Juche ideology and socialism. Recipients include people who have contributed to the space and nuclear programs of the country.

The history of the order dates back to 2012, when it was instituted on 3 February, the 70th birthday of Kim Jong Il. It is decorated with a picture of his face, the emblem of the Workers' Party of Korea, and the flag of North Korea.

== History ==
The Order of Kim Jong Il was instituted on 3 February 2012, on the occasion of the 70th birthday of Kim Jong Il. At its institution, the order was awarded to 132 people.

== Eligibility ==
The order can be awarded to individuals (government officials or workers) or to military units, businesses, or social organizations "who have made distinguished service in the drive to accomplish the revolutionary cause of Juche, the cause of building a thriving socialist nation."

== Precedence ==
Order of Kim Jong Il is the highest of the North Korean orders, along with the Order of Kim Il Sung, named after Kim Il Sung. Next in the order of precedence is the Order of the National Flag, the oldest order of the country.

== Specifications ==
The order is 67 mm in length and 65 mm wide. It has a portrait of smiling Kim Jong Il on it at the center of golden ear of rice, above a golden five-pointed star. The upper part of the order features the emblem of the Workers' Party of Korea and the lower part the flag of North Korea. The back has the text: "Order of Kim Jong Il" along with a serial number and a pin. The accompanying miniature medal has a five-pointed star at the center of a golden plate, which is 33 mm in wide and 10 mm in length, and has a pin at its back.

== Recipients ==
- 132 named people (14 February 2012)
- Choe Yong-rim (14 February 2012)
- Jang Sung-taek (14 February 2012)
- Ju Kyu-chang (14 February 2012)
- Kim Ok (14 February 2012)
- Kim Kyong-hui (14 February 2012)
- Kim Yong-nam (14 February 2012)
- Kim Ki Nam
- Ri Su-yong (14 February 2012)
- Ri Yong-ho (14 February 2012)
- Kim Yong-chol (14 February 2012)
- Hyon Yong-chol (February 2012)
- Kim Yong-dae (February 2012)
- Mansudae Art Studio (2 May 2012)
- Mangyongdae Revolutionary School (October 2012)
- Kang Pan-sok Revolutionary School (October 2012)
- Kim Il-sung Military University (22 October 2012)
- So Man-sul
- Korean Committee of Space Technology (KCST) (4 January 2013)
- Kim Rak-hui
- Rakwon Machine Complex, North Phyongan Province (6 February 2013)
- March 5 Youth Mine, Jagang Province (6 February 2013)
- Kanggye Unha Garment Factory, Sariwon City, North Hwanghae Province (6 February 2013)
- Migok Co-op Farm, Sariwon City, North Hwanghae Province (6 February 2013)
- Paek Kye-ryong (6 February 2013)
- O Su-yong (6 February 2013)
- Kim Chang-myong (6 February 2013)
- Ro Kyong (6 February 2013)
- Choe Tae-il (6 February 2013)
- Pak Cho-yong (6 February 2013)
- Ryom Chi-gwon (6 February 2013)
- Kang Kil-yong (6 February 2013)
- Mi Chang-guk (6 February 2013)
- Yun Ho-nam (6 February 2013)
- U Tok-su (6 February 2013)
- Ryom U-un (6 February 2013)
- Kim Jong-gwan (December 2013)
- Ri Ung-won (30 January 2014)
- Kim Song (30 January 2014)
- Unit 267 of the Korean People's Army (December 2013)
- Sangwon Cement Complex (December 2013)
- Five unnamed persons in connection with the launch of Kwangmyongsong 3-2 (30 January 2014)
- 17 unnamed persons in connection with the 2013 North Korean nuclear test (21 February 2014)
- So Jae-guk (December 2013)
- Kim Kuk-tae
- Jong Pong-jun (20 December 2013)
- Archives of Photographs Related with Revolutionary History (5 February 2014)
- Kim Yun-ha (March 2014)
- Hwang Sun-hui (April 2012)
- Jon Pyong-ho
- Kim Tuk-sam (21 January 2015)
- Pak Kyong-gyu (21 January 2015)
- Unnamed light aircraft developers (April 2015)
- Ryu Mi-yong
- Jin Pong-jun
- Sin Kyun (16 February 2021)
- Ri Yong-suk
- Kim Yong Ju
- Ri Tong Hyok (16 February 2026)
- Hong Yun Chol (16 February 2026)
- Kim Un Chol (16 February 2026)

== See also ==
- Orders and medals of North Korea
