= Soldier's Medal of Honour =

- Type: Order
- Awarded for: For acts of individual gallantry in combat
- Country: North Korea
- Presented by: The Democratic People's Republic of Korea
- Eligibility: Individuals
- Campaign: Korean War
- Status: Currently given
- Established: July 1, 1950
- Ribbon of the Soldier's Medal of Honour 1st Class

The Soldier's Medal of Honour (Korean: 전사의 영예 훈장) was instituted on July 1, 1950. The order is a military award of North Korea given to soldiers and guerrillas for combat bravery or leadership of troops in battle. Designed along the lines of and awarded with the criteria as the same level as the Soviet Order of the Patriotic War. North Korea granted a 50% pension to any soldier permanently disabled in an action that result in the soldier being awarded the order.

According to North Korean propaganda, the order was initiated by Kim Il Sung: "On June 28, Juche 39 (1950), Kim Il Sung told an official that he was going to award the Seoul unit title to those that participated in the Seoul liberation operation, adding citations also should be conferred on meritorious soldiers." According to these claims, later that day, he asked an artist to create the design of the order. The following day, Kim "suggesting inscribing letters 'For the fatherland' and a soldier with rifle in hands in the order and decorating its frame with red-color star." He approved the revised design the following day and "personally named it Order of Soldier's Honor."

During the Korean War, 7,972 Koreans and 530 Chinese received the award in its first class and 112,170 Koreans and 6,349 Chinese in its second class.

== See also ==
- Orders, decorations, and medals of North Korea
