= Americans in North Korea =

Americans in North Korea consist mainly of defectors and prisoners of war during and after the Korean War, as well as their locally born descendants. Additionally, there are occasional tours and group travel which consist of Americans via train or plane from China, some with temporary lodging and stay.

== Prisoners of war ==
On September 17, 1996, The New York Times reported the possible presence of American POWs in North Korea, citing declassified documents. The documents showed that the U.S. Defense Department knew in December 1953 that "more than 900 American troops were alive at the end of the war but were never released by the North Koreans". The Pentagon did not confirm the report, saying it had no clear evidence that any Americans were being held against their will in North Korea but pledged to continue to investigate accounts of defectors and others who said they had seen American prisoners there. The North Korean government has said it is not holding any Americans.

== Notable people ==
=== Korean War ===
Operation Big Switch, the exchange of remaining prisoners of war, commenced in early August 1953 and lasted into December. During that period, some 21 American soldiers refused to return to their homeland and decided to stay in the country (along with one British soldier and 327 South Koreans).

=== Notable defectors ===
- Anna Wallis Suh (1950, died 1969)
- Larry Allen Abshier (1962, died 1983)
- James Joseph Dresnok (1962, died 2016)
- Jerry Wayne Parrish (1963, died 1998)
- Charles Robert Jenkins (1965, left North Korea in 2004, died 2017)
- Roy Chung (1979, died 2004)
- Joseph T. White (1982, died 1985)
- Travis King (July 2023, expelled from North Korea in September 2023)

=== International tourists ===
- Otto Warmbier (December 12, 1994 – June 19, 2017) was an American college student who was imprisoned in North Korea in 2016 on a charge of subversion. In June 2017, he was released by North Korea in a vegetative state and died soon after his parents requested his feeding tube be removed.
- Kenneth Bae (born August 1, 1968) a naturalized United States citizen born in South Korea, was detained after escorting 5 European tourists into North Korea through the city of Rajin on Nov. 3 2012. He was sentenced to 15 years of imprisonment in April 2013.
- Matthew Todd Miller (born August 26, 1989) is a U.S. citizen who was detained in North Korea (DPRK) after traveling there, tearing up his tourist visa, and requesting political asylum. On November 8, 2014, Miller was released after eight months in North Korea.
- Dennis Rodman (born May 13, 1961) is an American basketball player. He claimed Kim Jong-un was his "friend for life."
- Jeffrey Edward Fowle (born 1958) is an American citizen who was arrested during a vacation in North Korea in May 2014 for leaving a Bible in a club in the northern port city of Chongjin.
- Merrill Newman (May 20, 1928 – January 17, 2022) was arrested in 2013.

== See also ==
- 2009 imprisonment of American journalists by North Korea
- Foreign Account Tax Compliance Act
- List of Americans detained by North Korea
