= List of American and British defectors in the Korean War =

This list names the 22 United Nations soldiers and prisoners of war (one Briton and 21 Americans) who declined repatriation to the United Kingdom and United States after the Korean War in favour of remaining in China, and their subsequent fates. Also listed are soldiers who defected to North Korea.

== Background ==
Prisoner repatriation was one of the greatest stumbling blocks in the long cease-fire negotiations between the forces of the UN and those of China and North Korea. The warring factions finally agreed on an exchange of sick and wounded prisoners, Operation Little Switch, which was carried out in April and May 1953. That June, the two sides agreed that no prisoner who did not wish to be repatriated would be forced to do so (this had long been a sticking point in negotiations, with the Chinese and North Koreans wanting all prisoners returned to their home countries). Prisoners who did not wish to go back to their home countries would be given 90 days in a neutral compound near Panmunjom to reconsider before being allowed to stay in enemy territory. Following the signing of the Korean Armistice Agreement (which South Korea declined to sign) on 27 July 1953 which brought the fighting in the Korean War to a halt, the main prisoner exchange was free to proceed.

Operation Big Switch, the exchange of remaining prisoners of war, commenced in early August 1953, and lasted into December. 75,823 communist soldiers (70,183 North Koreans, 5,640 Chinese) were returned to their homelands. 12,773 UN soldiers (7,862 South Koreans, 3,597 Americans, and 946 British) were sent back south across the armistice line. Over 14,000 communist soldiers, many of whom were former Republic of China soldiers who fought against the communists in the Chinese Civil War, refused repatriation. Similarly, one Briton and 23 American soldiers (along with 327 South Koreans) also refused to be returned to their homelands. Two, Corporal Claude Batchelor and Corporal Edward Dickenson, changed their minds before the 90-day window expired. Both were court-martialed and sentenced to prison terms, with Batchelor serving 4½ years and Dickenson 3½.

This left 22 UN soldiers who voluntarily stayed with the communists after the final exchange of prisoners. The 21 Americans were given dishonourable discharges. This had the unintended consequence of rendering them immune to court-martial when they finally returned to the U.S. (which the majority eventually did), because they were no longer active-duty military. However, they were still criminally culpable for any acts of collaboration or offenses against fellow prisoners committed while they were POWs.

At about 4:00 am on 24 February 1954, a train carrying the 21 American defectors crossed the Yalu River into China. The Chinese soon shipped some of the men off to study language and politics. Others went to mills, factories, and farms across Eastern China.

== List of defectors ==
=== American ===
- Adams, Clarence (Cpl.). A soldier from Memphis, Tennessee. Adams, an African-American, cited racial discrimination in the U.S. as the reason he refused repatriation. While a prisoner, Adams took classes in communist political theory, and afterwards lectured other prisoners in the camps. Because of this and other collaboration with his captors, his prosecution by the U.S. Army was likely upon his repatriation. During the Vietnam War, Adams made propaganda broadcasts for Radio Hanoi from their Chinese office, telling Black American soldiers not to fight:

You are supposedly fighting for the freedom of the Vietnamese, but what kind of freedom do you have at home, sitting in the back of the bus, being barred from restaurants, stores and certain neighborhoods, and being denied the right to vote. ... Go home and fight for equality in America.

Adams married a Chinese woman and lived in China until the increasingly anti-Western atmosphere of the Cultural Revolution led him to return to the U.S. in 1966. The House Un-American Activities Committee subpoenaed Adams upon his return but did not question him publicly. He later started a Chinese restaurant business in Memphis. Adams died in 1999 and is buried in Memorial Park Cemetery in Memphis. Adams' autobiography An American Dream: The Life of an African American Soldier and POW Who Spent Twelve Years in Communist China was posthumously published in 2007 by his daughter Della Adams and Lewis H. Carlson.

- Adams, Howard Gayle (Sgt.). From Corsicana, Texas. He worked in a paper factory in Jinan. He refused all media requests for interviews. Little is known of Howard Adams's fate but a 1976 New York Times article about James Veneris reported that Howard Adams had returned to the United States, but may have gone back to China.
- Belhomme, Albert Constant (Sgt.). A native of Belgium who emigrated to the U.S. as a teenager. He lived in China for ten years, working in a paper factory in Jinan, before returning to Antwerp.
- Bell, Otho Grayson (Cpl.). Originally from Olympia, Washington. Chose not to return despite having a wife and baby girl back in the U.S. In China, Bell was sent to a collective farm with William Cowart and Lewis Griggs (see below). Bell described himself, Cowart and, Griggs as "the dummy bunch", saying they were sent to the farm because they could not learn Chinese. They returned to the U.S. together in July 1955, were arrested, but were released when it was found that the military no longer had jurisdiction over the defectors after they were dishonourably discharged. Bell died in 2003.
- Gordon, Richard (Sgt.). A native of Chicago, Illinois. He returned to the U.S. in January 1958. He was reported to live in Milwaukee, Wisconsin in 1961 and moved to Chicago in 1962. He reportedly continued to support communism after returning to the country. He died in 1988 and is buried in Wood National Cemetery in Milwaukee.
- Cowart, William (Cpl.). Returned with Bell and Griggs (see below). Later the three soldiers sued for their back pay. The case went to the U.S. Supreme Court, which held that Bell, Cowart, and Griggs were entitled to their back pay from the time they were captured to the time they were dishonourably discharged.
- Douglas, Rufus (Sgt.). Died in China a few months after his arrival in 1954. The manner of his death is not certain but is believed to have been from natural causes.
- Dunn, John Roedel (Cpl.). Born in Altoona, Pennsylvania on 29 June 1928. He married a Czechoslovak woman while in China and settled in Czechoslovakia in December 1959. Roedel died in Slovakia in 1996.
- Fortuna, Andrew (Sgt.). Originally from Greenup, Kentucky. He was awarded two Bronze Stars for his service in Korea before he was captured. He returned to the U.S. on 3 July 1957. He worked in Portsmouth, Ohio in 1958; in Detroit, Michigan, from 1963–64; and Chicago in 1964. He was reported to be in Gary, Indiana as of 1964. He died in 1984.
- Griggs, Lewis Wayne. Returned with Bell and Cowart in 1955. He was listed as a senior majoring in sociology at Stephen F. Austin State University, graduating in 1959. He died in 1984.
- Hawkins, Samuel David (Pfc.). From Oklahoma City, Oklahoma. He married a Russian woman in China and returned to the U.S. in February 1957, shortly before his wife was permitted to come as well. He successfully petitioned the government to change his discharge from dishonourable to other than honourable. He raised a family, and has given interviews to the press on the condition that his location not be disclosed.
- Pate, Arlie (Cpl.). Worked in a paper mill before returning with Aaron Wilson (see below) in 1956. He died in 1999.
- Rush, Scott (Sgt.). Married in China. After living in China for ten years, he and his wife moved to the U.S. and settled in the Midwest.
- Skinner, Lowell (Cpl.). His mother begged him to come home over the radio at the time of the prisoner exchange, to no avail. He married in China, but left his wife behind when he returned to the U.S. in 1963. Later, he had problems with alcoholism and spent six months in a psychiatric hospital. He died in 1995.
- Sullivan, LaRance. Returned in 1958 and died in 2001.
- Tenneson, Richard (Pfc.). Returned in 1955. He went to Louisiana a few months later to welcome home fellow defector Aaron Wilson (see below). He settled in Utah before dying in 2001.
- Veneris, James (Pvt.) (1922–2004). Born to a Greek family in Vandergrift, Pennsylvania he stayed in China and became a dedicated communist, taking the Chinese name "Lao Wen". He worked in a steel mill, participated in the Great Leap Forward, hung posters during the Cultural Revolution, married three times, and had children. He visited the U.S. in 1976, but returned to China where he is buried.
- Webb, Harold (Sgt.). From Jacksonville, Florida. He married a Polish woman in China and moved to Poland in 1960, reportedly settling in Katowice. In 1988, he was given permission to settle in the U.S. He is the subject of the Youth Defense League song "Turncoat" about rejection of a Korean War defector seeking a return to the U.S.
- White, William (Cpl.). Married and obtained a bachelor's degree in international law while in China. He returned to the U.S. in 1965.
- Wills, Morris (Cpl.). From Fort Ann, New York. He played basketball for Peking University and got married in China. He returned to the U.S. in 1965 and got a job in the Asian Studies Department at Harvard University. His autobiography, Turncoat: An American's 12 Years in Communist China, was published in 1966. He died in 1999.
- Wilson, Aaron (Cpl.) (1932–2014). Originally from Urania, Louisiana. Wilson was one of five American defectors who never went beyond the eighth grade as a child. He was captured in 1950, during the first days of the Chinese-led counteroffensive that stymied UN gains on territory held by the North Koreans. His lack of education and three years of indoctrination are cited as reasons for his decision to stay. He returned to the U.S. on 6 December 1956. Wilson married and worked in his Louisiana hometown's mill. Later in life, Wilson flew a U.S. flag from an 18-foot (5.5 m) pole in his front yard. For an interview he gave to the Korean War Veterans Association in 2002 he told the interviewer, "This is the greatest country in the world, and maybe when I was 17 years old I didn't know it, but I do now." He died in 2014 and is buried in Silverhill, Alabama.

=== British ===
Andrew Condron, a Scotsman of 41 (Independent) Royal Marine Commando, was the only Briton to decline repatriation. Allegations of American biological warfare during the Korean War have been reported to have influenced Condron's decision to live in China; however, those who knew him have said he was motivated by admiration of Maoism and Marxist theory. Regarding his desertion Condron said "I made my gesture because I am against war. I have spent my years in China learning a lot."

The British government refused to rule out the possibility of arrest and trial if he returned to the UK. Regarding Condron, Lieutenant Colonel J. L. Lindop of the Intelligence Division of the Admiralty stated that the Royal Navy "regard Condron as a deserter and ... he is liable to be arrested and charged with desertion" and as a result it was difficult for Condron to return to the UK.

In 1955, Condron was included in the editor's list for a book entitled: Thinking Soldiers – by Men Who Fought in Korea. In the following quotation written by Condron he expresses his disillusionment with military life:

'...the soldier today can no longer be viewed as a robot. The more different kinds of experience he has, the more he fits them together in his mind. That is why all those who consider the soldier merely as a thing to be used, like the rifle he carries or the pack he wears, are bound to come out very badly in their calculations. Our experience, and that of the men who wrote this book, included battle, capture and much thought in Korea. We were a few among many thousands.

Despite political and personal reasons for his defection, Condron's lifestyle in China challenged the core socialist values of the regime. The Foreign Office and British embassy in Beijing reported Condron had been drinking "on a fairly hearty scale" and fraternising with Chinese girls, which was taboo at the time. In 1959 Condron was in a relationship with Jaquelin Hsiung-Baudet, an illegitimate daughter of the French diplomat Philipe Baudet whom he met while working as an English teacher at the Beijing Language and Culture University.

Condron returned to the UK in 1960 due to growing xenophobia in China, and received an honourable discharge from the Royal Marines. In 1962, Jaquelin moved to the UK to join her then husband. In 1963, Condron worked selling copies of Encyclopædia Britannica door-to-door, while Jaquelin worked at the BBC World Service. Condron and his wife had a son, Simon, who attended the University of Cambridge in the 1970s. Jaquelin divorced Condron due to alcoholism and later emigrated to the U.S. His son, Simon, worked at the BBC and Condron lived in his London flat until his death in March 1996 at the age of 68.

== Documentaries ==
- They Chose China (2005), a 52-minute documentary film, directed by Shui-Bo Wang. Includes interviews with Samuel Hawkins and the families of Clarence Adams and James Veneris (both of whom were already deceased when the film was made), and archived interviews with Veneris and Adams.
- Crossing the Line (Korean: 푸른 눈의 평양시민, "A Blue-Eyed Pyongyang Citizen in North Korea"), a 2006 documentary film by Daniel Gordon and Nicholas Bonner.

== Additional defectors since the ceasefire ==
Seven additional American servicemen are known to have defected to North Korea since the signing of the Korean Armistice Agreement:

- Larry Allen Abshier (1962)
- James Joseph Dresnok (1962)
- Jerry Wayne Parrish (1963)
- Charles Robert Jenkins (1965)
- Roy Chung (1979)
- Joseph T. White (1982)
- Travis King (2023)
