= Doina Bumbea =

Romanian abducted to North Korea (1950–1997)

- Image of Doina Bumbea taken from her Facebook page, administered by her living brother
- Born: 25 January 1950; Bucharest, Romania
- Died: January 1997 (aged 46–47); Pyongyang, North Korea
- Occupation: Painter
- Spouse(s): Unidentified Italian citizen (m. 1970; div. 1972) James Joseph Dresnok (m. 1979)
- Children: 2

Doina Bumbea (Korean: 도이나 붐베아; 25 January 1950 – January 1997) was a Romanian painter who was abducted to North Korea in 1978. Born in Bucharest, Bumbea left Romania in 1970 and went to Italy, where she studied fine arts and became a painter. There, she was contacted by a person who promised her a job as gallery curator in Japan if she gave an art exhibition in Pyongyang, North Korea. Bumbea accepted and was taken there, but she was not allowed to leave the country.

It has been reported that Bumbea was kidnapped along with other foreign women to obtain wives for American defectors in North Korea and prevent them from marrying ethnic Koreans and having mixed children with them. Thus, Bumbea was forcibly married to James Joseph Dresnok, with whom she had two sons. Bumbea died in 1997 of lung cancer in Pyongyang. Later, her brother Gabriel founded an NGO in her honor and tried to contact his nephews in North Korea. The Ministry of Foreign Affairs of Romania and several Romanian officials have been made aware, but no significant response has been given in the case.

== Biography ==
Doina Bumbea was born on 25 January 1950 in Bucharest, Romania. She had two brothers, one of them being Gabriel Bumbea. The other one died in 2014. Her father died in 1989, but as of 2014, her mother was still alive.

In 1970, Bumbea left Romania and went to Rome, where she married an Italian citizen. Bumbea would later study fine arts and become a painter. In 1978, she met an Italian posing as an art dealer who promised her a job as a gallery curator in Tokyo, Japan, if she made an art exhibition in Pyongyang, North Korea, first. She accepted this and was sent to North Korea, from where she would not be allowed to leave.

According to Charles Robert Jenkins, an American defector in North Korea, this country reportedly kidnapped Bumbea and other foreign women for a "spouse-sourcing" program for American defectors in North Korea, as the birth of ethnically mixed Koreans went against the wishes of the state, but also to obtain a number of ethnically non-Korean agents for the country. Therefore, Bumbea was forcibly married in the early 1980s to the American defector James Joseph Dresnok by the North Korean authorities. She had two children with Dresnok, Theodore Ricardo Dresnok, born in December 1981; and James Gabriel Dresnok, born in February 1983. Bumbea died from lung cancer in January 1997 in Pyongyang, isolated from the outer world. Her husband died in 2016, while her two children would become soldiers in the North Korean army.

Bumbea's family only discovered what had occurred to her in 2006, when they connected Jenkins's accounts with a BBC documentary about James Joseph Dresnok, who was still in North Korea. In 2008, following her death, Bumbea's brother Gabriel founded the Doina Bumbea Association, a Romanian NGO dealing with missing persons and their search and rescue. In 2014, he attended a meeting of the United Nations Human Rights Council in Geneva, Switzerland, representing this association. At this meeting, the situation of the North Korean abductees was discussed. He also attempted to meet with or contact his nephews, although unsuccessfully. Gabriel has created a page in honor of Bumbea on Facebook.

The Ministry of Foreign Affairs of Romania was aware of Bumbea's case and met with Gabriel to talk about it. It made some statements, but did not speak much about the subject. Gabriel has also met with former Romanian presidents Ion Iliescu and Traian Băsescu, but also with senator Dan Horațiu Buzatu and MEP Marian-Jean Marinescu, all in relation to Doina Bumbea. Although the Ministry of Foreign Affairs made efforts to clarify the situation with the North Korean authorities, they were ignored in Pyongyang.

== See also ==
- List of kidnappings
- List of solved missing person cases
