= Joseph T. White =

American defector to North Korea (1961–1985)

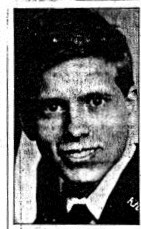
- White in 1982
- Born: November 5, 1961; St. Louis, Missouri, U.S.
- Died: August 17, 1985 (aged 23); Ch'ongch'on River, North Korea
- Military career
- Allegiance: United States; North Korea (1982–1985)
- Branch: United States Army
- Service years: 1981–1982 (defected)
- Rank: Private
- Units: 1st Battalion, 31st Infantry Regiment

Joseph T. White (November 5, 1961 – August 17, 1985) was a United States Army soldier who defected to North Korea on August 28, 1982.

== Life and career ==
Born to Norval and Kathleen White, he had four siblings and volunteered for the 1980 Reagan presidential campaign before he could vote. In 1979, he attended a YMCA model legislature and introduced a 'bill' requiring 11 months of reserve military service for all 18-year-old males. He was also a member of the Boy Scouts and volunteered at a muscular dystrophy camp. In 1980, he introduced another bill in the model legislature that called for Missouri to withdraw from the union, and a list of "present abuses and injustices" of the federal government. Rejected by West Point, he intended to join the Army directly but was persuaded by his parents to attend Kemper Military School in Boonville, Missouri. The school commandant remembered White as an introvert and a loner. White subsequently dropped out of school and enlisted in the Army as an infantryman.

After completing basic and advanced individual training, White was assigned to 1st Battalion, 31st Infantry Regiment in South Korea. At around 2 a.m., on August 28, 1982, he shot the lock off one of the gates leading into the Korean Demilitarized Zone and was witnessed by fellow soldiers walking through the DMZ from Guard Post Ouellette, near Kaesong with a duffle bag full of documents he stole from the site including the layout of mines which were buried on the South Korean side of the DMZ. He surrendered to North Korean troops. He was the first American soldier to request asylum in North Korea since January 1965 and the fifth since the Korean War.

North Korean authorities refused a request by United Nations Command representatives to meet White and ask him about the reasons for his defection. North Korean authorities released a video of White, in which he denounced the United States' "corruptness, criminality, immorality, weakness, and hedonism," affirming he had defected to demonstrate how "unjustifiable [it was] for the U.S. to send troops to South Korea", before leading a chant in homage to North Korean leader Kim Il Sung.

Prior to White's defection, Charles Jenkins, in 1965, was the last U.S. soldier to cross the demilitarized zone into North Korea. (Note: Roy Chung deserted after Jenkins and before White, but Chung did not cross the DMZ.) Jenkins wrote in his memoirs that he never met White, but once saw him on state television at a press conference soon after the defection. He also wrote that plans were in the works for White to share housing with one of the other American defectors, but it eventually fell through. According to Jenkins' contacts in government, White suffered an epileptic seizure of some form and was left paralyzed. Following that, Jenkins heard nothing more about him.

In February 1983, White's parents received a letter from their son, stating that he was happy in North Korea and working as an English teacher.

In November 1985, his parents received a letter penned by a North Korean contact of White, stating that their son had died by drowning in the Ch'ongch'on River in August 1985, and his body was not recovered. A copy of the letter was released by Dick Gephardt, then a Congressman representing Missouri, in early 1986.

== See also ==
- List of American and British defectors in the Korean War: the 21 Americans and 1 Briton who refused repatriation during Operation Big Switch in 1953 (to remain in China)
- Larry Allen Abshier (1943–1983) of Urbana, Illinois, deserted in May 1962 at age 19
- James Joseph Dresnok (1941–2016) of Richmond, Virginia, deserted on August 15, 1962, at age 21
- Charles Robert Jenkins (1940–2017) of Rich Square, North Carolina, deserted in January 1965 at age 24
- Jerry Wayne Parrish (1944–1998) of Morganfield, Kentucky, deserted in December 1963 at age 19
- Travis King (born 1999 or 2000) of Racine, Wisconsin, deserted in July 2023 at age 23
