= Anocha Panjoy =

Thai woman kidnapped by North Korea (born 1955)

- Anocha Panjoy before her abduction
- Born: Buapha Panjoy (บัวผา ปันจ้อย); July 12, 1955 (age 71); Huai Sai, San Kamphaeng, Chiang Mai, Thailand
- Disappeared: 21 May 1978 (aged 22); Macau
- Status: Missing for 48 years, 5 months and 26 days
- Spouse: Larry Allen Abshier (m. 1978; died 1983)

Anocha Panjoy (Thai: อโนชา ปันจ้อย; RTGS: Anocha Panchoi; born July 12, 1955) is a Thai national who was abducted by North Korean agents from Macau on 21 May 1978. Her case only became known after the release of the American Charles Robert Jenkins and his Japanese family in 2004.

== Early life and abduction ==
Panjoy was born in the village of Ban Nong Sae in Huai Sai, San Kamphaeng District, Chiang Mai Province, northern Thailand. Her father, Som Panjoy, was a Korean War veteran. Panjoy's mother died while she was a child, and her father died three months before the family became aware of what had happened to her.

After graduating from high-school, Panjoy moved to Bangkok, and then to Macau where she worked as a massage therapist in a local hotel. On 21 May 1978, she left her apartment telling her friends she was going to a local beauty parlour. According to Charles Robert Jenkins, whose book The Reluctant Communist tells of the abduction as related to him personally by Panjoy, she had agreed to take a man claiming to be a Japanese tourist on a guided boat tour. On a nearby beach, she was then ambushed and forced onto the boat, before being taken to North Korea.

== Life in North Korea ==
Shortly after her arrival in Pyongyang, Panjoy was forced to marry U.S. defector Larry Allen Abshier. In 1980 Panjoy and her husband moved into an apartment near Jenkins and his Japanese wife Hitomi Soga, herself an abductee. Panjoy became close with the family. Abshier died in 1983.

Panjoy continued to live close to the Jenkins family until 1989, when she married an East German businessman who worked for the government. Soga and Jenkins last saw Panjoy in 1989, shortly before her second wedding.

Jenkins stated that when he met Panjoy, she wished to return to Thailand and reunite with her family.

== Sightings and information since 2000 ==
In 2003, shortly before his departure to Japan, Jenkins was told by North Korean officials that if he chose to remain in North Korea, he would be allowed to live with Panjoy. This made him believe she was still alive.

Panjoy's family had no information about her condition until 2005, when her older brother recognised her in a photograph being held by Jenkins during a television interview. Once her family realised she was alive until at least 1989, they began to look for help to have her returned.

In 2005, Panjoy's brother met Teruaki Masumoto, the secretary general of the National Association for the Rescue of Japanese Kidnapped by North Korea (NAKRN).

In 2006, the city of Chiang Mai, near Panjoy's hometown staged a photo exhibition to draw attention to her story. Suknam Panjoy wrote an open letter to his sister, supported by NARKN, and ReACH.

I wonder if you miss me after you read this letter? Since seeing your news, everybody in our family hopes to see you soon. This abduction should never have happened to you. Everybody wants to see you. You know, after you disappeared, we have faced many trials and tribulations. We have spent a lot of money trying to find you. Our father fell ill so I finally admitted him to the hospital at age 97. But, he passed away last year. I hope that if you read this letter, you will miss all of your family. Your family wants to help you come back. You don’t need to be afraid of anything.

With the death of Kim Jong-il in December 2011, people were hopeful that progress could be made in negotiations between the countries.

North Korea denies that Panjoy was abducted by its agents or that she was ever in the country. North Korea also denies the abduction of the nationals of any country other than Japan.

== See also ==
- List of people who disappeared mysteriously: 1910–1990
- Human rights in North Korea § International abductions
