= American Koreans =

American Koreans may refer to:

- Americans in North Korea, residents of North Korea from the United States
- Americans in South Korea, residents of South Korea from the United States
- Korean Americans, United States citizens of Korean descent
