= Defection =

Giving up of allegiance to one state for allegiance to another

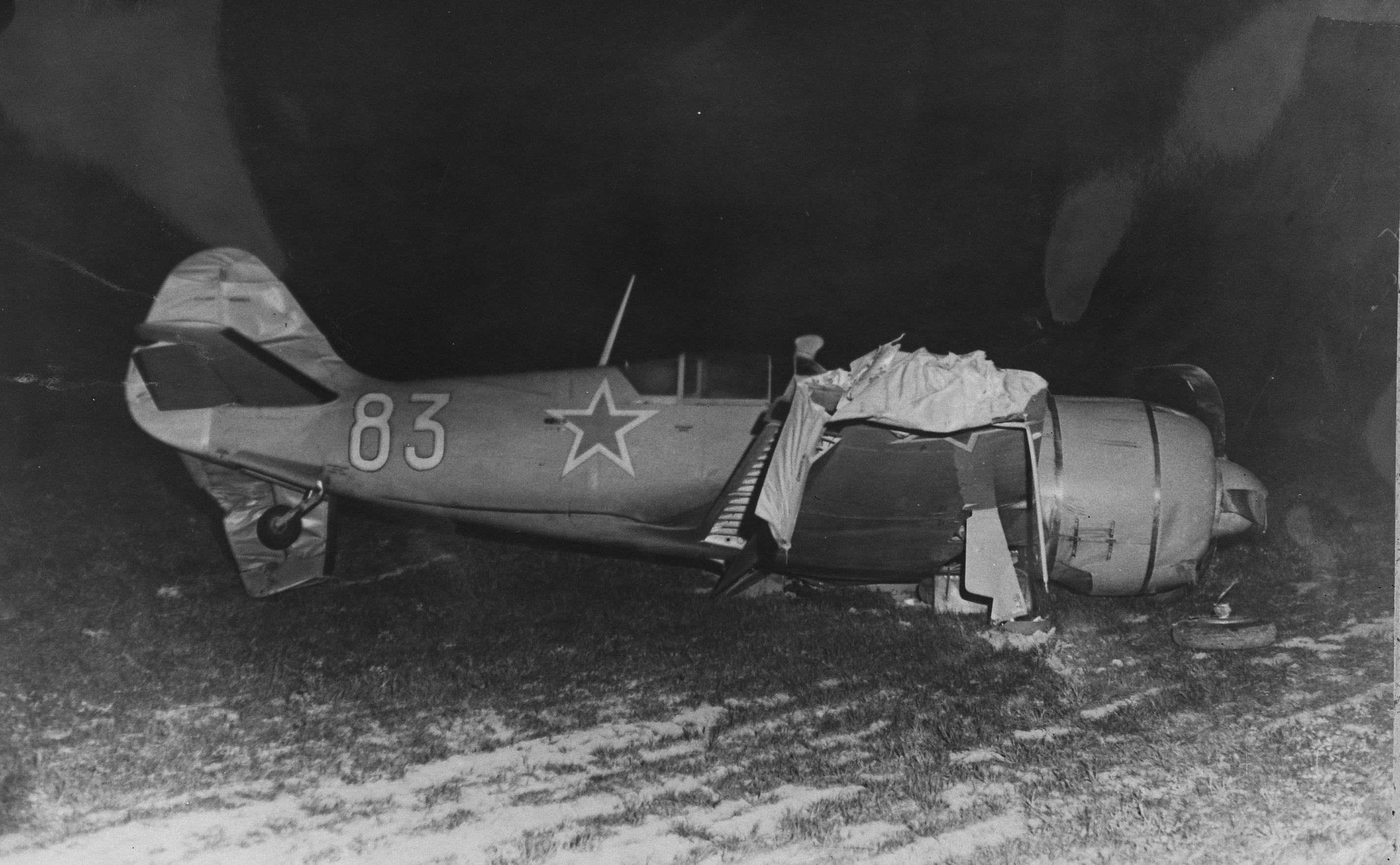
A Soviet Lavochkin La-7 fighter aircraft that crash-landed in Sweden after being flown there by a defecting pilot, May 1949

In politics, a defector is a person who gives up allegiance to one state in exchange for allegiance to another, changing sides in a way that is considered illegitimate by the first state. More broadly, defection involves abandoning a person, cause, or doctrine to which one is bound by some tie, as of allegiance or duty.

This term is also applied, often pejoratively, to anyone who switches loyalty to another religion, sports team, political party, or other rival faction. In that sense, the defector is often considered a traitor by their original side.

== International politics ==
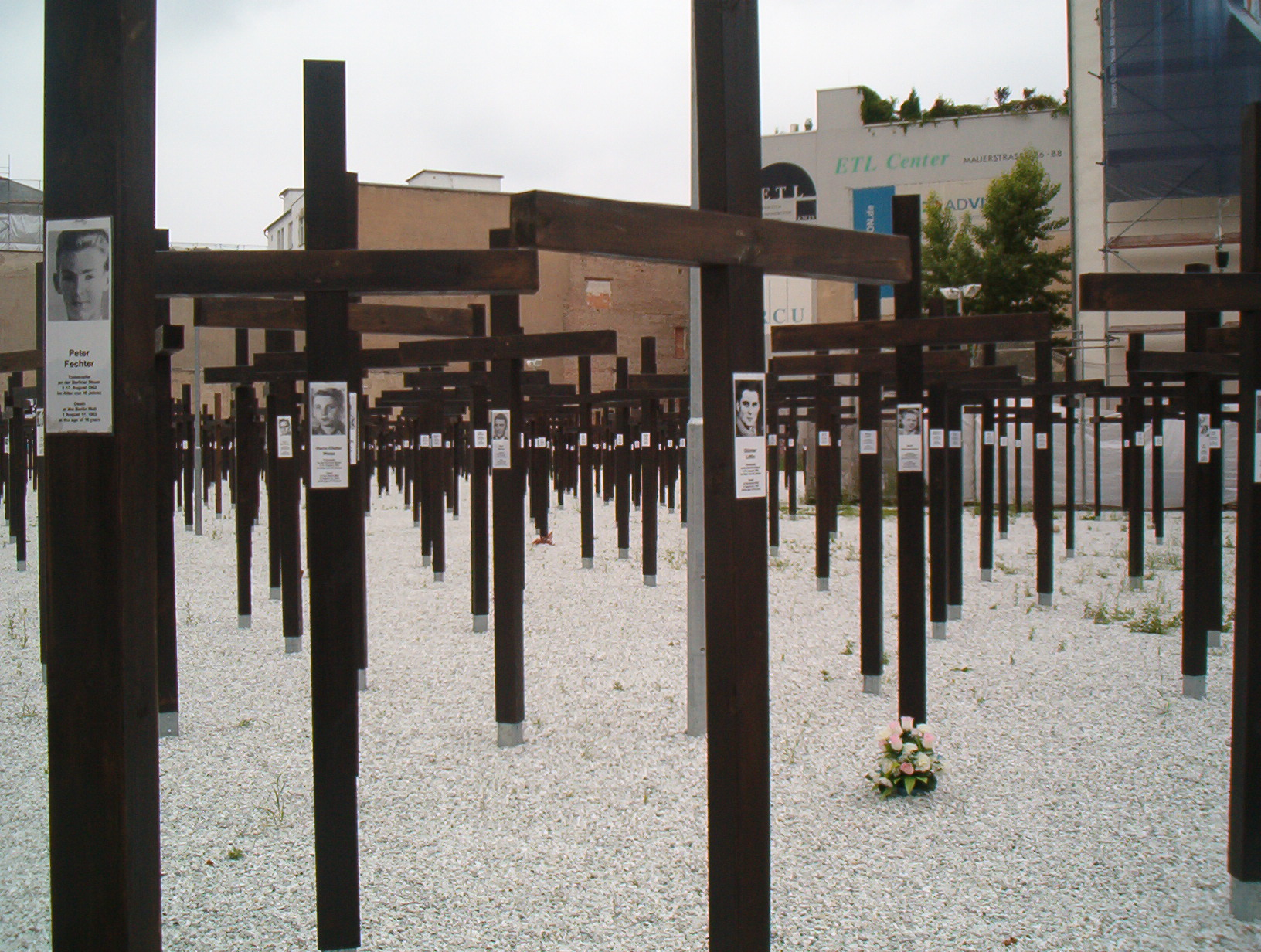
A memorial to those who died trying to cross the Berlin Wall stood for ten months in 2004 and 2005 near Checkpoint Charlie.

The physical act of defection usually occurs in a manner that violates the laws of the nation or political entity from which the person is seeking to depart. By contrast, mere changes in citizenship, or working with allied militia, usually do not violate any law.

For example, in the 1950s, East Germans were increasingly prohibited from traveling to the western Federal Republic of Germany, where they were automatically regarded as citizens according to exclusive mandate. To enforce the policy, the Communist German Democratic Republic erected fortifications along the Inner German border, beginning in 1952, and the Berlin Wall in 1961. When people tried to defect from the GDR, they were to be shot on sight. Several hundred people were killed along that border in their Republikflucht attempt. Official crossings did exist, but permissions to leave temporarily or permanently were seldom granted. On the other hand, the GDR citizenship of some "inconvenient" East Germans was revoked, and they had to leave their home on short notice against their will. Others, like singer Wolf Biermann, were prohibited from returning to the GDR.

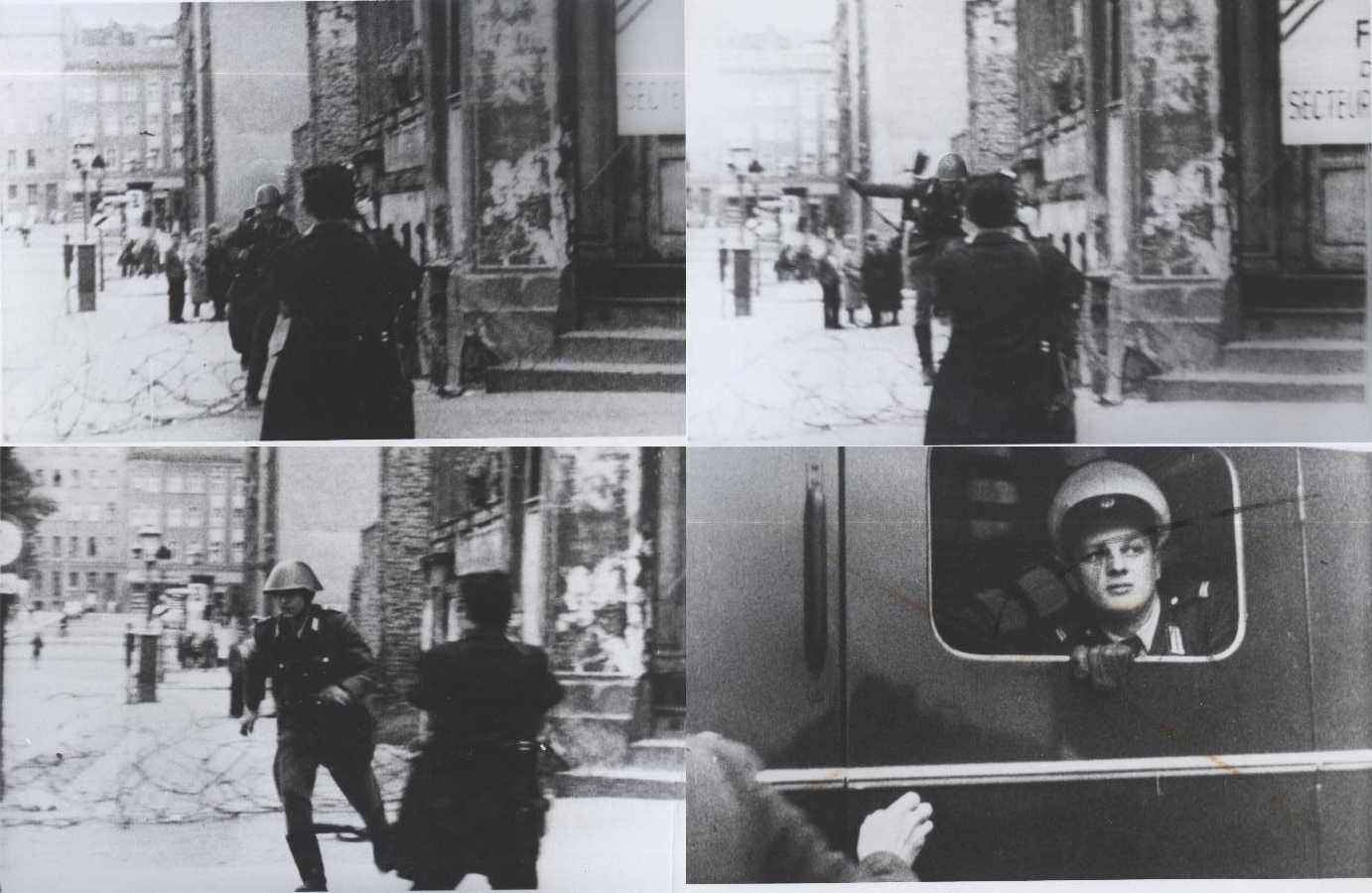
East German border guard Konrad Schumann jumping the border in 1961

During the Cold War, the many people illegally emigrating from the Soviet Union or Eastern Bloc to the West were called defectors. Westerners defected to the Eastern Bloc as well, often to avoid prosecution as spies. Some of the more famous cases were British spy Kim Philby, who defected to the USSR to avoid exposure as a KGB mole, and 22 Allied POWs (one Briton and twenty-one Americans) who declined repatriation after the Korean War, electing to remain in China.

When an individual leaves their country and provides information to a foreign intelligence service, they are considered a HUMINT source defector. In some cases, defectors remain in the country or with the political entity they were against, functioning as a defector in place. Intelligence services are always concerned when debriefing defectors with the possibility of a fake defection.

Entire militaries can defect and choose not to follow orders from a state's leaders. During the Arab Spring protests, militaries in Egypt and Tunisia refused orders to fire upon protesters or use other methods to disperse them. The decision to defect can be driven by the desire to prevent insubordination: if a military leader judges that lower officers will disobey orders to fire upon protesters, they could be more likely to defect.

== Notable defectors ==
=== Artists ===
- Paquito D'Rivera, Cuban saxophonist and clarinetist, who defected to the United States in 1980.
- Mikhail Baryshnikov, Soviet (Russian) dancer, who defected to Canada in 1974, while in Toronto, touring with the Kirov Ballet. He later moved to the United States.
- Natalia Makarova, Soviet (Russian) dancer, who defected while in London in 1970.
- Georgi Markov, Bulgarian author, who defected in 1968, eventually settling in London, England, later assassinated.
- Rudolf Nureyev, Soviet (Russian) dancer, who defected while in Paris touring with the Kirov Ballet in 1961.
- George Balanchine, Georgian choreographer, who defected to the Weimar Republic in 1924.
- Arturo Sandoval, Cuban trumpeter, pianist, and composer, who defected to the United States in 1990.
- Jan Sobota, Czech fine bookbinder, who defected to Switzerland in 1982, and settled in the United States in 1984.

=== Athletes ===
- Guillermo Rigondeaux, Cuban professional boxer, who defected to the United States in 2009.
- Aroldis Chapman, Cuban baseball pitcher, who defected to Andorra in 2009 before signing a Major League Baseball contract in 2010.
- Ernst Degner, East German Motorcycle racer, who defected to West Germany in 1961
- José Fernández, Cuban baseball player, who defected to the United States in 2008.
- Lutz Eigendorf, an East German football player for BFC Dynamo who defected to West Germany in 1979.
- Orlando Hernandez, Cuban baseball pitcher, who defected to the United States in 1997.
- Nadia Comăneci, Romanian Olympic gymnast, who defected to the United States in 1989.
- Martina Navratilova, Czechoslovak tennis player, who defected to the United States in 1975.
- Alexander Mogilny, Soviet (Russian) ice hockey forward, who defected to the United States in 1988. He was the first Soviet player to defect to play in the NHL.
- Béla Károlyi and his wife Márta Károlyi, Romanian gymnastics coaches (of Nadia Comăneci and Mary Lou Retton among others), who defected to the United States in 1981.
- Osvaldo Alonso, Cuban soccer player, who defected to the United States in 2007.
- José Abreu, Cuban baseball player, who defected to the United States in 2013.
- Kimia Alizadeh, Iranian taekwondo martial artist, who defected to the Netherlands in 2020.
- César Prieto, Cuban baseball player, who defected to the United States in 2021.
- Krystsina Tsimanouskaya, Belarus sprinter, who defected to Poland in 2021.

=== Military ===
- Larry Allen Abshier, the first of six American soldiers to defect to North Korea between the years 1962–1982. He died in 1983 from a heart attack while residing in Pyongyang.
- Benedict Arnold‚ a colonial general who during the American Revolutionary War defected to the British Army.
- Riad al-Asaad, founder of the Free Syrian Army and the entire Tlass Family during the Syrian civil war.
- Viktor Belenko, a Soviet Air Force lieutenant who flew a MiG-25 fighter to Japan in 1976 and gained political asylum in the United States.
- James Joseph Dresnok, a US Army private who defected to North Korea by sneaking across the Demilitarized Zone in 1962. He would live the remainder of his life in the DPRK until his death in 2016.
- Igor Gouzenko, a Soviet cipher clerk who defected to Canada and released information regarding Soviet espionage activities in western society. Credited as one of the triggering factors for the beginning of the Cold War.
- No Kum-Sok (later Kenneth Rowe) is known for having been a lieutenant in the North Korean Air Force during the Korean War who defected to South Korea. On September 21, 1953, he flew his MiG-15 to the Kimpo Air Base in South Korea, claiming that he wanted to get away from the "red deceit" and is often associated with Operation Moolah.
- Maxim Kuzminov, former Russian military pilot-navigator of the Mi-8AMTSh military transport helicopter. During the Russian-Ukrainian War, on August 9, 2023, he flew across the front line to the Ukrainian side as part of the special Operation Synytsia, prepared by the Main Intelligence Directorate of the Ukrainian Defense Ministry.
- Genrikh Lyushkov, the NKVD chief in the Russian Far East, defected to Manchukuo in 1938 under the Great Purge and then cooperated with the Imperial Japanese Army.
- Ivan Mazepa, Ukrainian Hetman of Zaporizhian Host from 1687–1708 who defected from the Russian Empire to the Swedish Empire during the Battle of Poltava of the Great Northern War.
- Lee Harvey Oswald, the later assassin of President John F. Kennedy had claimed defection to the Soviet Union in October 1959 but was ultimately refused citizenship and returned to the United States in 1962.
- Ion Mihai Pacepa, a Romanian Securitate general who defected to the United States from the Socialist Republic of Romania in 1978.
- Matiur Rahman, a Pakistani/Bangladeshi pilot who in 1971 attempted to defect with a T-33 along with confidential Pakistani war plans to India to join the Bangladesh Liberation War. However his plan was foiled by Flt.Lt Rashid Minhas who crashed the plane after a brief struggle for control over the aircraft. The plane crashed some 50 Kilometres from the border.
- Leamsy Salazar, former lieutenant colonel of Bolivarian Navy of Venezuela and head of security detail for Hugo Chávez, defected to United States in December 2014.
- Heng Samrin, a top-brass military figure in Democratic Kampuchea defected to Vietnam during the Khmer Rouge purges of the Eastern Zone after considering the fate of So Phim, his superior in command.
- Samson Makintsev (1740–1849), a sergeant of the Russian Empire who deserted to Qajar Iran and became a general in the Persian military, becoming the commander of the Bogatyr battalion, a Persian military battalion made up of Russian deserters, during the reign of Abbas Mirza.
- Travis King, a US Army private who defected to North Korea, possibly to avoid facing a dishonorable discharge and legal charges, in 2023. North Korea would later return him to American custody.

=== Politics ===
- Guy Burgess, British diplomat and member of the Cambridge Five, defected to the Soviet Union in 1951.
- Donald Maclean, British diplomat and member of the Cambridge Five, defected to the Soviet Union in 1951.
- Kim Philby, British intelligence officer and member of the Cambridge Five, defected to the Soviet Union in 1963.
- Hun Sen, Khmer Rouge battalion commander and later Prime Minister of Cambodia (1998–2003), defected to Vietnam in 1977.
- Viktor Suvorov, Russian writer and former Soviet military intelligence officer who defected to the United Kingdom in 1978.
- Thae Yong-ho, a former North Korean diplomat for Britain. At an unknown date Thae defected from North Korea for his family, because he "didn't want his children, who were used to life of freedom, to suffer life of oppression". Being one of North Korea's elite, for the nation he was the highest profile defection since No Kum-sok (above) in 1953. He was elected to the South Korean National Assembly in 2020 for the United Future Party, representing the Gangnam A district of Seoul.
- Vladimir Petrov, Soviet diplomat who defected to Australia in 1954.

=== Others ===
- Viktor Korchnoi, Russian chess Grandmaster, defected in Amsterdam in 1976.
- Walter Polovchak, minor, defected to the United States in 1980 at 12. He and his parents moved to the United States from Soviet Ukraine in 1980 but later that year his parents decided to move back to Ukraine. He did not wish to return with them and was the subject of a five-year struggle to stay permanently. He won the right to permanent sanctuary in 1985 upon turning 18.
- The Soviet crew of the oil tanker Tuapse, held hostage in 1954 by the government of Taiwan during the White Terror. An unusual case of forced defection, where the crew were forced to defect to the United States to secure their release. Those who refused were subjected to various forms of torture, while those who subsequently retracted their defection and returned to the Soviet Union were sentenced for treason but later pardoned. All surviving crew were released in 1988.
- Vaas Feniks Nokard, in order to defect from Russia in 2021, swam from Kunashir Island to Hokkaido, a distance of about 20 kilometers, in 23 hours.
- Yeonmi Park is a North Korean defector and activist whose family fled from North Korea to China in 2007.
- Oh Chong-song is a North Korean defector who was shot 5 times by North Korean soldiers for crossing the Military Demarcation Line, he was rescued by South Korean soldiers.
- Ri Jong-yol, a North Korean defector and mathematics child prodigy, fled to the Consulate General of South Korea in Hong Kong immediately succeeding his participation in the 2016 International Mathematical Olympiad taking place nearby.

== See also ==
- Apostasy
- Desertion
- Dissident
- Eastern Bloc emigration and defection
  - List of Soviet and Eastern Bloc defectors
  - List of baseball players who defected from Cuba
  - North Korean defectors
  - Nevozvrashchentsy
- Espionage
- List of Cold War pilot defections
- List of Western Bloc defectors
  - Martin and Mitchell defection
  - List of American and British defectors in the Korean War
  - South Korean defectors
- List of Iranian defectors
- List of Syrian defectors
- Opposition (politics)
- Political dissent
- Prisoner's dilemma
- Religious disaffiliation
- Treason
- Turncoat
- Party switching
