= North Korea–Togo relations =

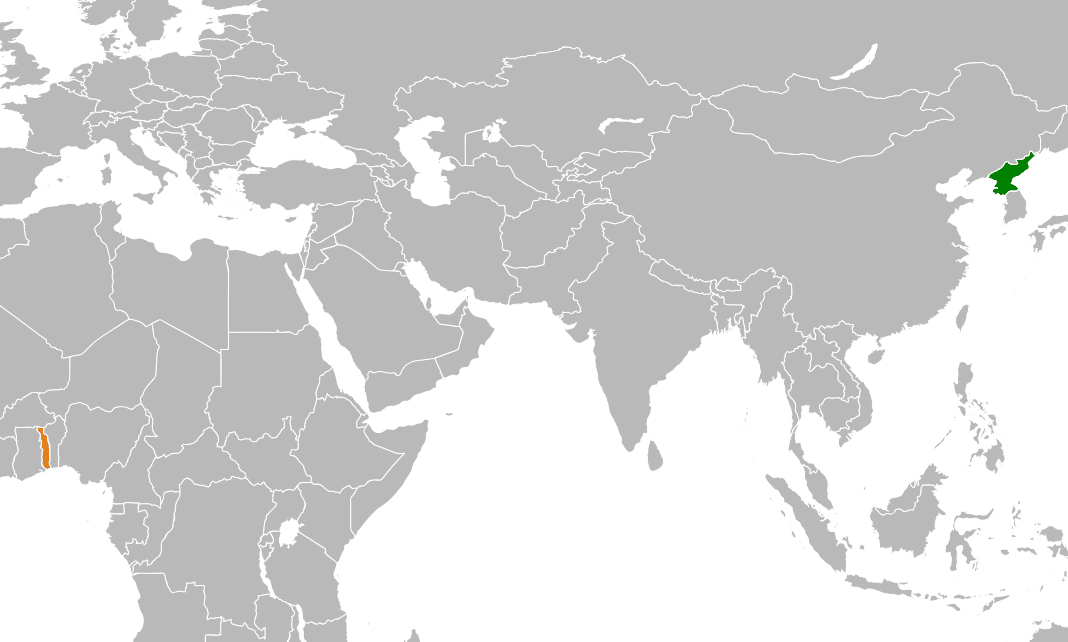

- North Korea: Togo

North Korea–Togo relations refers to the current and historical relationship between the Democratic People's Republic of Korea and the Republic of Togo. Neither country maintains an embassy in their respective capitals, although North Korea formerly had an embassy in Lomé, which closed down in 1998. The North Korean embassy in Lagos, Nigeria is also accredited to Togo.

== History ==
During the 1967–2005 rule of General Gnassingbé Eyadéma, father of former President Faure Gnassingbé, Togo maintained close relations with the Democratic People's Republic of Korea (DPRK), despite the Togolese government's pro-Western and right-wing stances. In 1974, Eyadéma visited Pyongyang, meeting with Kim Il Sung. On 17 September 1974, he broke off relations with South Korea, and expelled the South Korean embassy staff from Togo.

During the Cold War, the DPRK provided significant aid to the Togolese government. The military of Togo also received training from North Korean military adviser teams deployed to the country.

American defector to the DPRK James Joseph Dresnok's third son, Tony, is of partial Togolese descent through his mother, who was the daughter of a Togolese diplomat and his Korean wife.

== See also ==
- Foreign relations of North Korea
- Foreign relations of Togo
