= Hitomi Soga =

Japanese abductee to North Korea (born 1959)

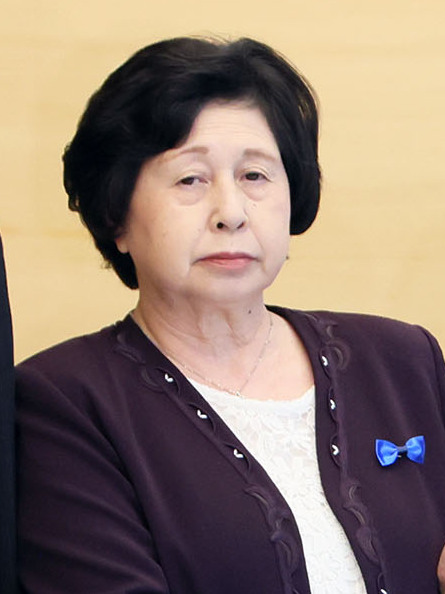
- Soga in 2023
- Born: May 17, 1959 (age 67); Sado, Niigata, Japan
- Disappeared: August 12, 1978 (age 19); Sado
- Status: Returned
- Other name: Min Hye-gyeong
- Known for: Kidnapping victim
- Spouse: Charles Robert Jenkins (m. 1980; died 2017)
- Children: Mika Soga-Jenkins (daughter); Brinda Soga-Jenkins (daughter)

Hitomi Soga-Jenkins (Japanese: 曽我ひとみ Soga Hitomi, born May 17, 1959) is a Japanese woman who was abducted to North Korea together with her mother, Miyoshi Soga, from Sado Island, Japan, in 1978. In 1980, she married Charles Robert Jenkins, an American defector to North Korea, with whom she had two daughters. In 2002, she was allowed to return to Japan, followed two years later by her husband and children.

== Abduction and life in North Korea ==
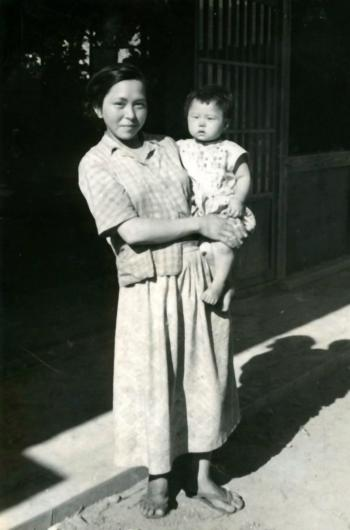
Hitomi Soga with her mother Miyoshi Soga, early 1960s

Soga, a nurse, was returning home from shopping with her mother Miyoshi, 46, when they were abducted from her hometown of Mano-cho, now part of the city of Sado, Niigata, on August 12, 1978, and taken to North Korea to train agents in Japanese customs and language. Her mother, Miyoshi, was later separated from her and has not been heard from since. The North Koreans gave Soga the Korean name Min Hye-gyeong (Korean: 민혜경). At the direction of the North Korean government, the 21-year-old Soga was assigned to live with Jenkins, officially to "learn English" from him in 1980, and they were married weeks later on 8 August. They had two daughters: Mika (born in 1983) and Brinda (born in 1985).

== Repatriation ==
Their situation changed in 2002 when Kim Jong Il, the leader of North Korea, admitted that in the 1970s and 80s his country had kidnapped 13 Japanese citizens. He claimed that eight had died, but that the other five would be allowed to return to Japan for a 10-day visit. In September 2002, Soga was one of the five Japanese abductees allowed to visit their homeland. Though the trip was intended to be brief, she, like her four companions, never returned to North Korea. She and many Japanese called on North Korea to release family members who had been left behind. On July 9, 2004, Soga was reunited with her husband and two daughters in Jakarta, Indonesia, which had been chosen as a neutral venue to allay fears that Jenkins would be arrested. The family came to Japan on July 18, 2004.

Jenkins was court-martialed and incarcerated for desertion at a U.S. military installation in Japan for 26 days before being released. According to media reports, the family settled in Soga's hometown of Mano, on Sado Island.

In October 2012, she reportedly pleaded with the North Korean government for the release of her mother and other abductees. Charles Robert Jenkins died in 2017.

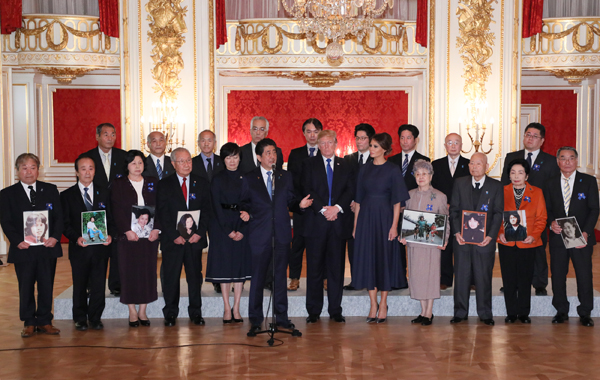
Hitomi Soga (front row, third from left) with Shinzō Abe and Donald Trump in Japan, 2017

== See also ==
- Anocha Panjoi – Thai woman kidnapped by North Korea (born 1955)
- List of kidnappings
- North Korean abductions of Japanese – 1977–1983 kidnapping cases
