= Travis King =

American soldier and failed defector to North Korea

- Born: Travis Travale King; February 15, 2000 (age 26)
- Military career
- Allegiance: United States
- Branch: United States Army
- Service years: 2021–2023 (Note: Classified as absent without leave (AWOL) from July 20 to September 27, 2023.)
- Rank: Private (formerly Private First Class)
- Units: 1st Brigade Combat Team, 1st Armored Division; 4th Infantry Division (Note: Administratively attached since 2022)

Travis Travale King (born February 15, 2000) is a former United States Army soldier known for crossing over the military demarcation line in the Joint Security Area (JSA) into North Korea on July 18, 2023, while on a civilian tour of the Korean Demilitarized Zone (DMZ). He was 23 years old at the time of his crossing into North Korea.

King was facing dishonorable discharge and additional disciplinary actions from the United States Army due to legal charges in South Korea, where he was stationed at the time of crossing, as well as other cases of misconduct, insubordination, assault, attempted escape from U.S. military custody, and possession of child pornography, which may have prompted his crossing. However, North Korean authorities asserted that King, who is black, fled after becoming "disillusioned with the inequality of American society and racial discrimination in its Army".

King was detained by North Korea on July 18, 2023, and was released on September 27, 2023, back to U.S. authorities. King was the first known detention of a U.S. national by North Korea since Bruce Byron Lowrance in November 2018.

== Early life ==
King was born in 1999 or 2000 to father Thomas King and mother Claudine Gates. He grew up in Racine, Wisconsin, and attended Washington Park High School, graduating in 2020.

== Military career ==
King enlisted in the United States Army in January 2021.

On September 25, 2022, King punched a South Korean man in the face multiple times at a nightclub in Seoul. The victim did not press charges and the Seoul court dropped the case.

On October 8, 2022, at 3:46 Korean Standard Time (7 October 18:46 UTC), King was involved in an altercation with South Korean locals in Mapo, Seoul. When police officers tried to question him, he continued with his aggressive behavior without answering questions from the officers. He was placed in the backseat of a police car where he shouted expletives and insults against Koreans, the South Korean army, and the South Korean police, such as "Asians can't see over the steering wheel". He also kicked the police vehicle's door several times, causing about ₩584,000 (US$458) in damages. He later pleaded guilty to assault and destruction of public goods and paid ₩1 million (US$783) to fix the vehicle. Because of this incident, King stayed behind in South Korea when his unit returned to the United States. King was then administratively attached to the 2nd Brigade Combat Team, 4th Infantry Division.

=== Detention in South Korea and crossing to North Korea ===
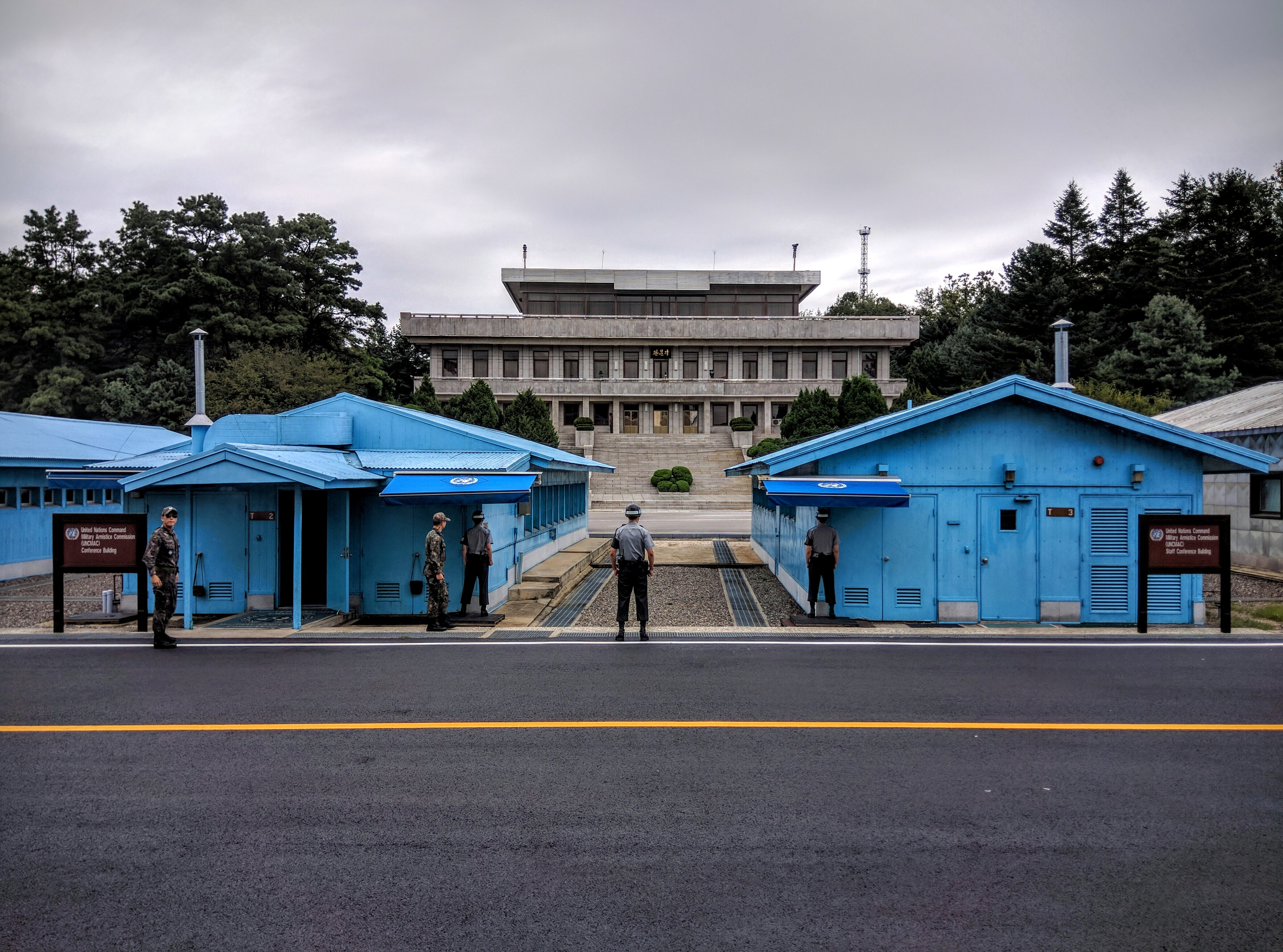
The Joint Security Area seen from South Korea, site of King's defection

Following charges of assault, King was fined ₩5 million (US$3,950) on February 8, 2023, by the Seoul Western District Court which he failed to pay. He was then held for 47 days at a South Korean detention facility in Cheonan (Note: It is unclear why King was detained in South Korea. The local court in Seoul did not sentence him in either of the cases. U.S. officials state that King was detained for "an unspecified infraction.") before being released on July 10, 2023. After his release, King spent a week at United States military base Camp Humphreys in Pyeongtaek under observation. He completed out-processing from the facility on July 17, 2023, and was escorted to Incheon International Airport the next day, as far as the customs checkpoint. As tickets are required to go beyond customs, the military escort could not continue further and King went into the terminal alone as a result. King was to board a flight to Fort Bliss, Texas, for "pending administrative separation actions for foreign conviction" in the United States, but instead fled the airport, approaching an American Airlines employee and claiming he was missing his passport.

After leaving the airport, King joined a group of tourists on a civilian tour of the Korean Demilitarized Zone (DMZ) at Panmunjom, and on July 18, 2023, at 15:27 Korean Standard Time (6:27 UTC), crossed the Military Demarcation Line (MDL) in the Joint Security Area (JSA) into North Korea. Witnesses claim that King, dressed in black, suddenly ran to the North Korean side of the Military Demarcation Line while the tour was ongoing, loudly laughing while running. Soldiers from the southern side chased after King. It is believed that King was taken into North Korean custody after being picked up by an unidentified van.

A U.S. Forces Korea spokesperson stated that King "willfully and without authorization crossed the Military Demarcation Line into the Democratic People's Republic of Korea (DPRK)," and on July 20, 2023, the United States Department of Defense declared King to be absent without leave (AWOL).

=== Time in North Korea ===
On July 24, 2023, the United Nations Command stated that they were in communication with the North Korean government regarding King. On August 1, the North Korean government acknowledged the United Nations Command's request for information regarding King and stated that they were investigating the incident, but stopped short of providing detailed information about King's status at the time in North Korea.

On August 4, 2023, the United States stated that King was not classified a prisoner of war due to his decision to cross into North Korea of his own free will, while in civilian attire. On August 15, the Korean Central News Agency (KCNA), the primary news outlet of North Korea, confirmed that King was in the country, stating that King illegally crossed into the nation due to "inhuman maltreatment and racial discrimination within the U.S. Army". KCNA further stated that King "expressed his willingness to seek refuge in the DPRK or a third country, saying that he was disillusioned at the unequal American society".

=== Expulsion from North Korea ===
On September 27, 2023, North Korean state media reported that King would be "expelled", and that he would be returned to American custody. Later that day, without any demands from the North Korean government, the Swedish government, which is the protecting power retained by the U.S. in North Korea, brought King to the Chinese border city of Dandong where he was transferred into U.S. custody following several weeks of private negotiations. From there, he was first flown to Shenyang and then to Osan Air Base in South Korea.

King was subsequently flown to Kelly Field at Joint Base San Antonio-Fort Sam Houston in San Antonio, Texas and arrived on September 28 around 12:30 a.m. Central Daylight Time (5:30 UTC). He was treated on base at Brooke Army Medical Center. The U.S. Department of Defense released a lengthy statement that their immediate goal was to focus on his health, privacy, and his return to his family. The US military was also to debrief him regarding his activities in North Korea, and any dialogues he may have had with North Korean officials.

=== Charges under the Uniform Code of Military Justice ===
Eight separate charges under the Uniform Code of Military Justice have been filed by the U.S. Army against King including desertion into North Korea, solicitation of child pornography, assault upon fellow soldiers, attempted escape from U.S. military custody, and insubordination. The legal team hired by his family includes Franklin Rosenblatt, who was lead defense counsel for Bowe Bergdahl. On August 27, 2024, it was announced that King would plead guilty to five of the 14 offenses he was charged with, those being the desertion charge, three counts of disobeying an officer, and assault on a non-commissioned officer. A statement issued by Rosenblatt said that King would "plead not guilty to the remaining offenses, which the Army will withdraw and dismiss". He was found guilty of the relevant charges and sentenced to 12 months in confinement but was released immediately due to good behavior and having served 338 days in detention.

King was also dishonorably discharged, something sought by the prosecution. King and his attorneys had sought a "bad conduct discharge."

== See also ==
- Americans in North Korea
- Larry Allen Abshier – American defector to North Korea (1943–1983)
- Roy Chung – American defector to North Korea (c. 1957 – c. 2004)
- James Joseph Dresnok – American defector to North Korea (1941–2016)
- Charles Robert Jenkins – American Army defector (1940–2017)
- Jerry Wayne Parrish – American defector to North Korea (1944–1998)
- Otto Warmbier – American imprisoned in North Korea (1994–2017)
- Joseph T. White – American defector to North Korea (1961–1985)
