= Larry Allen Abshier =

American defector to North Korea (1943–1983)

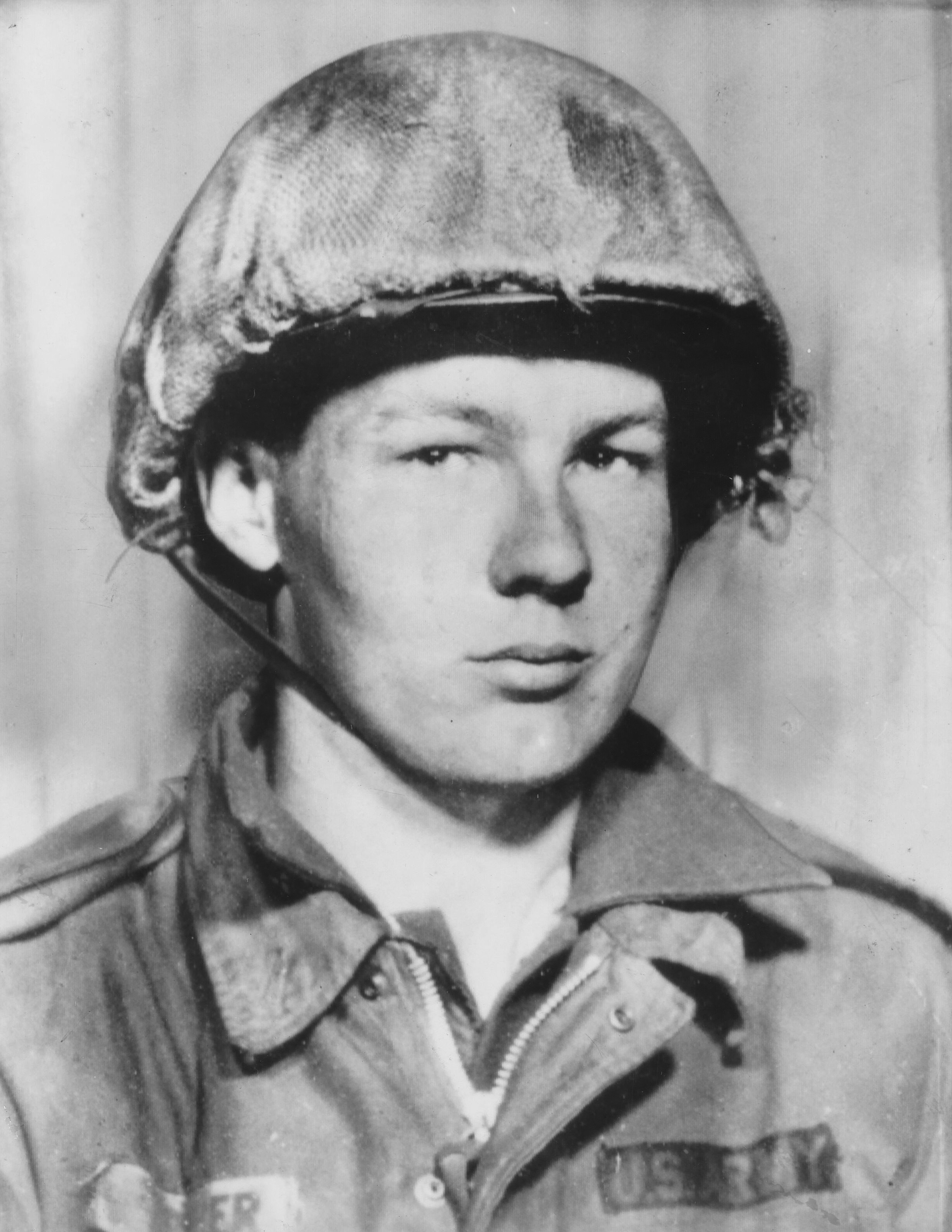
- Abshier in 1962
- Born: 1943; Urbana, Illinois, U.S.
- Died: July 11, 1983 (aged 40); Pyongyang, North Korea
- Spouse: Anocha Panjoy (m. 1978)
- Military career
- Allegiance: United States (1961–1962); North Korea (1962–1983)
- Branch: United States Army
- Service years: 1961–1962
- Rank: Private
- Units: 1st Reconnaissance Squadron, 9th Cavalry, 1st Cavalry Division

Larry Allen Abshier (1943 – July 11, 1983) was one of seven American soldiers to defect to North Korea in 1962 after the Korean War. He was born in Urbana, Illinois.

Originally stationed in South Korea, Abshier crossed into North Korea at the age of 19 under unclear circumstances. He later became a propaganda figure for the North Korean regime, appearing in state-produced media and reportedly working as an English teacher and actor in North Korean films. Abshier lived in North Korea until his death from a heart attack in 1983.

== Early life ==
Little is known about Abshier's childhood, which indicates an unstable upbringing. He grew up in Garfield Heights, Ohio, and his father ran a gas station ten miles away in Cleveland. By age 14, Abshier was a ward of the state at the Illinois Soldiers and Sailors Children's School. In 1961, Abshier enlisted in the U.S. Army and was deployed to South Korea. According to fellow defector James Dresnok, Abshier “was caught on it [marijuana] five or six times…They were going to court-martial him or kick him out of the Army…Instead of going back to his old life, he just came over to the DPRK.”

== Defection ==
Private Abshier, a member of the 1st Reconnaissance Squadron, 9th Cavalry, 1st Cavalry Division, abandoned his post in South Korea on May 28, 1962, when he crept away from his base and crossed the DMZ into North Korea. He was, for three months, the only American in North Korea, until Private James Joseph Dresnok defected in August.

In the 2006 documentary movie Crossing the Line, Dresnok recalls waking up to see a white face looking at him. "I opened my eyes. I didn't believe myself. I shut them again. I must be dreaming. I opened them again and looked and said, 'Who in the hell are you?' He says, 'I'm Abshier.' 'Abshier? I don't know no Abshier.'"

Abshier and three other American defectors—James Joseph Dresnok, Charles Robert Jenkins, and Jerry Wayne Parrish—appeared in several North Korean films, such as Unsung Heroes, portraying American antagonists. Their participation in these films made them recognizable figures within the country. The North Korean government utilized the men for state propaganda, distributing photographs internationally that depicted them living in favorable conditions and appearing successful and satisfied.

== Life in North Korea ==
Charles Jenkins wrote in his book The Reluctant Communist that Abshier had difficulty conversing in Korean but was fascinated by words and would spend hours studying vocabulary from newspapers. Jenkins reported that the four were moved into a one-room house in Mangyongdae-guyok in June 1965, where they lived together for several years, reading and memorizing passages by Kim Il Sung. Jenkins asserted that Dresnok would bully Abshier at this time, for example, by making a mess and then demanding that Abshier clean it up. Abshier was sympathetically characterized by Jenkins as "a simple, sweet, good-hearted soul who was more than a little dumb and easy to take advantage of."

For a time, Dresnok and Parrish pejoratively called Abshier "Lennie" after the simpleton from John Steinbeck's novel Of Mice and Men. Abshier never stood up to the bullying until convinced to do so by Jenkins. Eventually, Dresnok "made a move" on Abshier, but Jenkins defended him by beating Dresnok, after which Dresnok transferred his animosity to Jenkins. Abshier, like Dresnok, Parrish, and Jenkins, was "given" a North Korean woman to be his cook and minder, and to have sex with him. These women were thought to be infertile, having all divorced after a number of years of childless marriage. When Abshier's woman became pregnant, however, she was taken away.

Later, Abshier married another woman. In Crossing the Line, Dresnok claims she was Korean, but in The Reluctant Communist, Jenkins claims she was a Thai woman named Anocha Panjoy who was given to Abshier by the North Korean government. Jenkins claims she had been working as a masseuse in Macau when she was abducted by North Korean agents and brought to North Korea. Shortly thereafter, in 1978, she was "given" to Abshier. Jenkins' account of her abduction was greeted with incredulity, until he produced a photograph of her in North Korea, suggesting that North Korea may have abducted citizens of other countries in addition to those of Japan. They had no children. After Abshier's death, Anocha was taken away, allegedly to marry an East German entrepreneur in 1989.

== Death ==
Abshier died suddenly, shortly after midnight on July 11, 1983, at the age of 40 from a heart attack in Pyongyang.

== See also ==
- List of American and British defectors in the Korean War: the 21 Americans and 1 Briton who refused repatriation during Operation Big Switch in 1953 (to remain in China)
- Roy Chung, deserted in June 1979
- Joseph T. White (1961–1985) of St Louis, Missouri, deserted in August 1982 at age 20
- Travis King (born 1999 or 2000) of Racine, Wisconsin, deserted in July 2023 at age 23
