= James Joseph Dresnok =

American defector to North Korea (1941–2016)

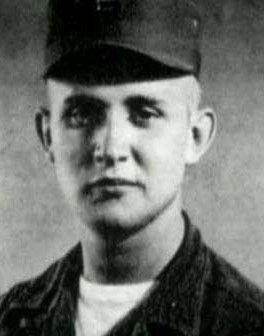
- US Army photo of Dresnok, prior to his defection
- Born: November 24, 1941; Norfolk, Virginia, U.S.
- Died: November 2016 (aged 74–75); Pyongyang, North Korea
- Spouses: Kathleen Ringwood (m. 1959; div. 1963); Doina Bumbea (m. 1979; died 1997); "Dada" (m. 2000)
- Children: 3
- Military career
- Allegiance: United States (1958–1962); North Korea (from 1962)
- Branch: United States Army (1958–1962)
- Service years: 1958–1962 (defected)
- Rank: Private first class
- Other work: Teacher, actor, translator

James Joseph Dresnok (Korean: 제임스 조지프 드레스녹, November 24, 1941 – November 2016) was an American defector to North Korea, one of seven U.S. soldiers to defect after the Korean War.

After defecting, Dresnok worked as an actor in propaganda films, some directed by Kim Jong Il, and as an English teacher in Pyongyang. He was featured on the CBS magazine program 60 Minutes on January 28, 2007, as the last U.S. defector alive in North Korea. He was also the subject of a documentary film, Crossing the Line, by British filmmakers Daniel Gordon and Nicholas Bonner, which was shown at the 2007 Sundance Film Festival.

Dresnok most often called himself Joe Dresnok but was also referred to as "James" or "Jim" Dresnok in media reports. He was known by most North Koreans as "Arthur", from his role in the miniseries Unsung Heroes (1978).

== Early life ==
Dresnok was born in Norfolk, Virginia, to Joseph Dresnok Sr. and Margaret Lucille Dresnok (née Mizelle), who were married in South Mills, North Carolina, on May 3, 1941. Joseph Dresnok Sr. served in the United States Army from November 23, 1937, until May 29, 1940.

The family was poor and fought over money. At one point, Margaret Dresnok fled with James and his younger brother, Joseph Jr., driving for hours, and the three would sleep in the car, essentially becoming homeless. Neither of the boys attended school during this period, and they wandered from place to place with their mother while she attempted to earn money through prostitution. She would often drink in bars at night, while leaving the boys in the car. Their family eventually tracked them down in Atlanta, after which Margaret lost custody of the children. Joseph Dresnok Sr. sent the two to live with relatives, with James going to live with an aunt and his brother with an uncle. He stated that his aunt was "annoyed" to be forced to raise her brother's child, and he would run away from home often.

Joseph and Margaret Dresnok divorced on July 10, 1951, in Richmond, Virginia. Dresnok's father initiated the divorce action, claiming that Dresnok's mother was "legally married to another." Eventually, James's aunt returned him to his father's house in Pennsylvania, unwilling to deal with him anymore. However, by this point his father had already found a second wife, and his brother had moved back in with them, with Joseph Sr. lying to his wife, saying he only ever had one son. After his father and stepmother got into an argument that night, the following morning, James's father drove him to a retirement home a few towns away, saying they were on the way to visit a relative. Telling James to wait in the reception area, Joseph Sr. got back into his car and drove away. James would never come into contact with his mother, father, or younger brother again. Dresnok reported that after this, he left the building and stole $20, then stole a nearby unattended bicycle, eventually being caught by the police. After almost being sent to a youth detention center, Dresnok was placed in a foster home in Glen Allen, Virginia, under the care of Presbyterian minister Carson T. Overstreet and his wife, Marguarite, where he felt welcomed.

Dresnok would end up dropping out of high school, and joined the Army the day after his 17th birthday, believing it was one of the few opportunities available left for him. During a short-term leave period, he returned to Richmond, Virginia and married Kathleen Ringwood, who he had met at church a short time earlier.

== Defection ==
Dresnok's first military service was two years spent in West Germany. He reported being treated harshly after "one minor offence", being forced to clean an armored truck with a toothbrush in sub-zero temperatures. He described it as the first thought he had of crossing into a communist country, although ultimately abandoned the idea at the time, saying that "if you went to the DDR they interrogated you and sent you back." After returning to the United States and finding out that his wife had cheated and left him for another man, he filed divorce papers at the request of his wife, and he re-enlisted and was sent to South Korea.

He was a private first class with the 1st Cavalry Division along the Korean Demilitarized Zone between North and South Korea in the early 1960s. Depressed and having lost any hope for a future outside the Army, Dresnok began spending all his military earnings on prostitutes and alcohol. Soon after his arrival, he found himself facing a court martial for forging his sergeant's signatures on paperwork that gave him permission to leave the base, which ultimately led to his going AWOL (absent without leave). At the time, he was stationed around 20 kilometres (12 mi) east of Kaesong.

Facing depression and fear of punishment, on August 15, 1962, three hours before he was due to meet with Captain Thomas Bryan regarding the court martial, while his fellow soldiers were eating lunch, he ran across a minefield in broad daylight into Kijong-dong in North Korean territory, where he was quickly apprehended by North Korean soldiers. Dresnok was taken by train to Pyongyang, the North Korean capital, and interrogated.

== Life in North Korea ==
I was fed up with my childhood, my marriage, my military life, everything. I was finished. There's only one place to go," Dresnok said in an interview. "On August 15th, at noon, in broad daylight when everybody was eating lunch, I hit the road. Yes, I was afraid. Am I gonna live or die? And when I stepped into the minefield and I seen it with my own eyes, I started sweating. I crossed over, looking for my new life.

Dresnok met Larry Allen Abshier, another U.S. defector, soon after his arrival. Eventually there were four of them: Dresnok, Abshier, Jerry Parrish, and Charles Robert Jenkins. The men lived together and participated in several propaganda efforts on behalf of the North Korean government. They appeared on magazine covers and used loudspeakers to try to persuade more U.S. soldiers at the border to defect. They did not wish to remain in North Korea indefinitely at first. In 1966, the four men tried to leave North Korea by seeking asylum at the Soviet embassy in Pyongyang, but the embassy immediately turned them over to North Korean authorities. After that, Dresnok decided to settle in North Korea.

Beginning in 1978, he was cast in several North Korean films, including one episode of the series Unsung Heroes (as an American villain called "Arthur Cockstead"), and he became a celebrity in the country as a result. He was called "Arthur" by his North Korean friends, after the name of his character in Unsung Heroes. He also translated some of North Korean leader Kim Il Sung's writings into English.

In his book The Reluctant Communist, Jenkins claims that Dresnok was a bully, betraying the other Americans' confidences to the North Koreans, and beating up Jenkins on 30 or more occasions on the orders of their Korean handlers. In the documentary Crossing the Line, Dresnok vehemently denied the allegations.

Dresnok asserts that "because of the sanctions of the U.S. Government and Japanese", during the North Korean famine of the 1990s, he was always given his full food ration by the government. "Why? Why do they let their own people starve to death to feed an American?" he asked. "The Great Leader has given us a special solicitude. The government is going to take care of me until my dying day."

== Personal life and marriages ==
In December 1959, Dresnok married Kathleen Ringwood, a 19-year-old from New York City. In Crossing the Line, Dresnok explains that after getting married at a young age, he was deployed in West Germany for two years while she remained in the U.S. He prided himself on "truly loving her and being loyal to her", but when he returned, he found out that she was already in another relationship. He was quoted as saying, "The good thing was that she did not get pregnant by me because I had promised that I would never abandon my children." However, they remained legally married until after his defection in 1962. She filed for divorce the next year, citing "willful desertion" on his part as grounds.

Dresnok was married twice more after defecting to North Korea. His second marriage was to a Romanian woman, Doina Bumbea (referred to as "Dona" in Jenkins's autobiography), with whom he had two sons, Theodore "Ted" Ricardo Dresnok (born 1980) and James Gabriel Dresnok (born c. 1982). Bumbea supposedly worked at the Romanian Embassy, but some accounts say that she never worked there and was in fact an abductee who had been taken by the North Korean secret service. According to Bumbea's family, she was living in Italy as an art student when she vanished, after telling people that she had met a man who promised to help arrange exhibitions of her art in Asia. After viewing Crossing the Line and seeing one of Dresnok's sons, Bumbea's brother stated he bore a startling resemblance to his missing sister. According to Jenkins' book, Bumbea was abducted in order to be the wife of one of the American deserters. The Romanian Foreign Affairs Ministry's website says that in 2007 the Romanian Government had requested an explanation for Bumbea's abduction from the North Korean government. However, no response was provided to Romania. Bumbea reportedly died of lung cancer in 1997.

After Bumbea's death, Dresnok married his third wife, identified by Jenkins as "Dada", the daughter of a North Korean woman and a Togolese diplomat. They had a son, Tony, in 2001. The family lived in a small apartment in Pyongyang, provided to them along with a monthly stipend by the North Korean government. Dresnok was in failing health, with a bad heart and liver (Dresnok described his liver as "full of fat"), which he attributed to smoking and drinking too much.

His younger son from his second marriage, James Dresnok, was a student at the Pyongyang University of Foreign Studies, where his father taught English in the 1980s. James speaks English with a Korean accent and considers himself Korean but he reportedly did not wish to marry a Korean woman. James joined the North Korean military in 2014, and in 2016 he reportedly held the rank of taewi, a rank that is equivalent to the rank of captain in the US Army. Both the younger James and the older Ted Dresnok are now married and they also have children of their own in North Korea. Like their father, they have also appeared as villainous Americans in North Korean films.

Dresnok stated that he intended to spend the rest of his life in North Korea, and no amount of money could have enticed him to move back to the West. Dresnok retired and occasionally gave lectures in North Korea and went fishing "just to pass the time."

== Death ==
In April 2017, the Western news organization NK News reported that Dresnok had died the previous year. In August 2017, Dresnok's sons confirmed that he had died of a stroke in November 2016. They released a statement saying that their father told them to remain loyal to Kim Jong Un and they also stated that the US would be destroyed if it launched a preemptive strike against North Korea.

== Filmography ==
While Dresnok was involved in many propaganda films, the specific number is unknown.

Filmography of James Joseph Dresnok
Year	Title	Role	Notes	Refs.
1978–1981	Unsung Heroes	Arthur	A North Korean epic miniseries	
1990	From 5pm to 5am	American general	A North Korean action film	
2006	Crossing the Line	Himself	A documentary film	

== See also ==
- Americans in North Korea
- List of American and British defectors in the Korean War
- North Korean defectors
- South Korean defectors
- Larry Allen Abshier
- Jerry Wayne Parrish
- Charles Robert Jenkins
- Roy Chung
- Joseph T. White
