= Ri Jong-yol =

North Korean defector and mathematician (born 1998)

Lee Jung-ho
- Born: Ri Jong-yol; 1998 (age 27–28); Pyongsong, South Pyongan Province, North Korea
- Citizenship: South Korea; North Korea (formerly)
- Education: Seoul National University; Seoul Science High School; Pyongyang No. 1 Senior Middle School
Medal record
Mathematics
Representing North Korea
International Mathematical Olympiad
| Silver medal – second place | 2013 Santa Marta | Individual |
| Silver medal – second place | 2014 Cape Town | Individual |
| Silver medal – second place | 2015 Chiang Mai | Individual |
| Silver medal – second place | 2016 Hong Kong | Individual |

Korean name
- Hangul: 리정렬
- RR: Ri Jeongryeol
- MR: Ri Chŏngnyŏl

Adopted name
- Hangul: 이정호
- RR: I Jeongho
- MR: I Chŏngho

Ri Jong-yol (Note: Also romanized as Ri Jong Yol or Jong Yol Ri (Western naming order), and erroneously by some news reports as Jong Yol-ri.) (Korean: 리정렬; born 1998) is a North Korean defector and child prodigy of mathematics. After winning silver at the 2016 International Mathematical Olympiad in Hong Kong, he made his way to the South Korean consulate general, where he took refuge for two months. Chinese authorities eventually allowed him to leave Hong Kong on a flight to Seoul. He legally changed his name to Lee Jung-ho (이정호) after receiving South Korean citizenship.

== Early life ==
Ri Jong-yol was born in 1998 to an academic family in Pyongsong in South Pyongan Province, North Korea. A child prodigy, he had a mastery of the entire elementary-school mathematics curriculum by the time he entered first grade at the age of seven. After winning a national mathematics competition in middle school, Ri was placed in Pyongyang No. 1 Senior Middle School, a school for gifted children.

He won silver medals at the 2013, 2014, 2015, and 2016 editions of the International Mathematical Olympiad (IMO). The 2013 IMO was his first, and he was noted for winning silver at his debut international event and for being the youngest member of the North Korean team at the time. Upon returning home from the 2015 IMO, Ri was informed by an acquaintance who worked for the Workers' Party of Korea that senior government figures had been interviewing his friends and family. He suspected that the North Korean government was planning to recruit him into a secretive military career after his high school graduation; Ri was viewed as a prime candidate for the country's elite hacking team. Ri's suspicions led to his decision to defect. He planned to do so at the 2016 IMO, the last one he could attend according to IMO rules, as he was about to turn eighteen.

== Defection ==
Ri defected immediately after winning a silver medal at the 2016 IMO, which was held at the Hong Kong University of Science and Technology (HKUST) from 6 to 16 July. The day after the competition, he left the university campus by himself and took a taxi to Hong Kong International Airport, hoping to meet South Koreans who could aid in his defection. At the airport, he approached the staff of a South Korean airline and spoke to their manager, who called the South Korean consulate general in Hong Kong. The consular staff informed Ri that he had to make his way to them on his own, as diplomats are forbidden from helping citizens of any country enter foreign missions. Ri subsequently took a taxi to the Far East Finance Centre, which houses the consulate, and declared his defection.

Security was tightened inside the consulate and around the Far East Finance Centre following Ri's defection. The consulate required visitors to clearly state the reason of their visit, pass through a door-frame metal detector, and have security guards check their belongings. The Hong Kong Police Force posted plainclothes officers at every entrance and exit of the building, including doorways in the elevator lobby and parking lot.

Ri lived in a small room inside the consulate for two months before the Chinese government permitted him to fly out of Hong Kong to Seoul. He reportedly spoke little to consulate staff in the first month but eventually got to know them. He passed time by playing video games and exercising on a treadmill. In late September 2016, Ri obtained a South Korean passport and a Hong Kong tourist visa, allowing him to leave the consulate as a South Korean visitor. Strained relations between China and North Korea at the time were cited as a possible reason for the former allowing Ri's departure. The Chinese government did not officially comment on Ri's defection.

=== Aftermath ===
Ri's defection prompted North Korea to not send a delegation to the IMO for two years. When North Korea resumed its participation, it began sending government minders to monitor staff and students on the team.

In a 2019 interview, Ri rejected a claim in a 2017 South China Morning Post report that his father had encouraged his defection. Ri stated that he had planned his defection alone and that his father would have discouraged him from defecting.

== Life after defection ==
Ri attended South Korean language and culture classes after arriving in Seoul. He attended Seoul National University and Seoul Science High School, working briefly as a researcher at the former. In a 2019 interview, he expressed his desire to obtain a scholarship to study in the United States.

Ri legally changed his name to Lee Jung-ho after obtaining South Korean citizenship.
