= Unsung Heroes =

North Korean film series

- Charles Robert Jenkins as Dr. Kelton, the fictional mastermind behind the Korean War
- Hangul: 이름 없는 영웅들
- Hanja: 이름 없는 英雄들
- RR: Ireum eomneun yeongungdeul
- MR: Irŭm ŏmnŭn yŏngungdŭl
- Directed by: People's Artiste Ryu Ho-son; Ko Hak-lim
- Written by: Lee Jin-woo
- Starring: Charles Robert Jenkins; Kim Ryong-lin; Kim Jung-hwa; Jung Woon-mo; James Joseph Dresnok
- Cinematography: People's Artiste Jong Gyu Wan
- Edited by: Merited Artiste Pak Su Ryo
- Music by: People's Artiste Kim Rin Ok; Merited Artiste Kim Kil Hak
- Production company: Korean Film Studio
- Distributed by: Mokran Video; Korean Film Export & Import Corporation
- Running time: 1315 minutes
- Country: North Korea
- Language: Korean

Unsung Heroes, also known as Unknown Heroes or more literally as Nameless Heroes, is a North Korean war drama mini-series about a spy in Seoul during the Korean War. Over twenty hours long, it was filmed and released in multiple parts between 1978 and 1981. It was the recipient of the Kim Il Sung Medal.

== Production and reaction ==
The production of Unsung Heroes began in or around 1978 on the initiative of Kim Jong Il when he took charge of the country's propaganda affairs.

Unsung Heroes received a widespread favourable reception in the domestic market, according to North Korean public media. Lead actor Kim Ryong-lin, who played the hero Yu Rim, stated that it was one of his favourite roles in over 20 years of acting; in a 1981 interview, he remarked that people had begun calling him Yu Rim instead of his real name after the series began, which he actually enjoyed because of his admiration for the character. Actress Kim Jung-hwa, who played female lead Kim Soon-hee, initially felt that she was unsuited for the role, as she had no prior military experience, or even experience playing a spy on-screen; her only preparation consisted of reading several books and interviewing real spies. The director Ryu Ho-son stated that his favourite scene was the one from the "Madonna Teahouse" in Part 5, in which former lovers Yu Rim and Kim Soon-hee each learn that the other is a North Korean agent.

Unsung Heroes was also responsible for propelling American defectors James Joseph Dresnok and Charles Robert Jenkins to minor celebrity status in North Korea. However, it did not receive public attention in the United States until 1996, when the U.S. Department of Defense obtained a copy of the movie; a report issued by five of their analysts identified Jenkins and one other unnamed American (later discovered to be Dresnok) as actors in the movie, providing the first evidence in three decades that Jenkins was still alive. Dresnok's popularity in his role was such that people in North Korea routinely referred to him as "Arthur," the name of the character he played in the film.

Unsung Heroes was broadcast on television in China in 1982, and released on DVD in 2003 by Dalian Audiovisual Publishing House. It was also screened in Japan during the Kitakyushu Biennial 2007. Its theme song "Embrace the Song of Happiness" (기쁨의 노래 안고 함께 가리라; kippŭmŭi norae an'go hamkke karira), composed by Chŏn Tong-u, remains widely known in North Korea; Grand National Party member Yu Hong-jun, head of South Korea's Cultural Heritage Administration, became the center of controversy in 2005 when he sang the song at an official dinner while visiting North Korea.

== Plot ==
The plot of Unsung Heroes is partially based on actual historical events during the Korean War, but many names and details were changed. The movie opens with an unidentified spy master giving instructions to protagonist Yu Rim, a Korean expatriate in the United Kingdom working as a journalist, who is ordered to proceed to Seoul and gather intelligence on the United States Forces Korea. Yu Rim arrives in Korea in 1952, and he first contacts Park Mu, the chief press officer for the Republic of Korea Army. Initially, he only has three contacts in Seoul: aside from Park, there was also Janet O'Neill, the wife of senior American intelligence official Dr. Kelton, and Lee Hong-sik, Park's handler through whom Yu also runs into his old lover Kim Soon-hee, who is apparently employed by the United States Counter Intelligence Corps, and is introduced to Colonel Klaus. Yu begins gathering intelligence on a coup plot by rightist South Korean general Sin Jae-sin. Lee helps him pass back this information to North Korea using his unwitting friend Kim Su-gyong as a courier. Lee is suspected by a US counter intelligence agent Martin who found Lee takes care of homeless kids. Soon after, Lee is killed in a shootout with CIC agents, including Kim Soon-hee, leaving Yu unable to pass his crucial intelligence back to his government. Yu calls Lee from a bar, but after realizing the person on the other end of the line is not Lee, hangs up immediately. A waitress in that bar is subsequently arrested and tortured by Colonel Klaus, who learns that a man suspected to be Yu was seen making the phone call.

Yu flees to a Hong Kong safe house run by a North Korean singer. He is instructed to return to Seoul and contact an agent code-named White Horse. However, he is suspicious of White Horse and sets a trap for him which reveals that he is working with Colonel Klaus. White Horse is then killed by an unknown person. Yu obtained the information from Janet O'Neill that John Foster Dulles is visiting Europe to get reinforcements. Yu meets Lewis, an army lieutenant, and converts him to Communism to relay this information; Lewis stages his own kidnapping so that he can disappear to the North for training, and later returns to Seoul. Two months later, Yu receives a coded message on Voice of Korea instructing him to contact an agent named Diamond, who turns out to be his old lover Kim Soon-hee, ostensibly working for the Americans but in reality a double agent for North Korean intelligence. With Dulles's agenda exposed to the media, the US plans a battle to demonstrate their superiority, but Yu obtains this information from Park. The Americans fail to get more reinforcements from their European allies and are defeated by a well prepared Korean People's Army.

Yu continues to gather intelligence on General Sin's coup attempt, this time passing messages back to Pyongyang by way of a radio operator disguised as a disabled veteran who begs outside hotels. Yu hides messages in cigarette filters, which he then throws on the ground near the beggar. However, he is unaware that he is being followed by the CIC, who are filming his activities. Colonel Klaus hears about a North Korean spy disguised as a veteran, and begins reviewing video tapes to check on Yu's activities. Kim saves the day by cutting the scenes out of the tapes to avoid further suspicion falling on Yu, but the disappearance of the scenes triggers Klaus' suspicion towards Kim herself. Klaus stages a test of loyalty for her, in which she is kidnapped and threatened with execution by American agents in Hokkaidō, Japan pretending to be Communists; however, Kim correctly senses this is a trap, and escapes by killing the agents.

Park realizes that Yu and Kim are spies. Klaus discovers that Yu was the one who leaked out intelligence. Park is pushed by Klaus, and kills Kim who tries to protect Yu. Later, Yu kills Park for revenge.

At the end of the series, the North Korean army starts new attacks, and forces the allies to negotiate for peace. Due to Yu's efforts, General Sin's coup is stopped by South Korean president Syngman Rhee's agents. Sin and Klaus commit suicide, while Yu leaves Korea.

== Characters ==
- Yu Rim (Kim Ryong-lin): A former guard in an Imperial Japanese Army POW camp and later a graduate of Cambridge University, he was recruited by North Korean intelligence while working as a reporter in Istanbul. He is sent to Seoul to gather intelligence on the United States forces there.
- Kim Soon-hee (Kim Jung-hwa): Yu's college sweetheart, now in a counter intelligence agent under Colonel Klaus. During the North Korean occupation of Seoul, she saved the life of an American agent who had been left behind, for which she was commissioned a lieutenant in the United States Army Counter Intelligence Corps by Klaus.
- Park Mu (Jung Woon-mo): Chief press officer for the Republic of Korea Army and a friend of Yu-rim's from Cambridge.
- Colonel Klaus: A member of the United States Army Counter Intelligence Corps, and Yu's main adversary. The actor playing the part is credited as Son Dae-won, but according to Charles Robert Jenkins, he was actually "an Italian vice dean of the music college in Pyongyang".
- Captain Martin (Yun Chan): Member of the United States Army Counter Intelligence Corps and an aide to Colonel Klaus.
- Dr. Kelton (Charles Robert Jenkins): The mastermind behind the Korean War.
- Janet O'Neill (Shu Ok-soon): The wife of Dr. Kelton, her cousin was an army soldier whose life was saved by Yu when interned in a prisoner-of-war camp. The character, although intended to be Caucasian, was instead played by a Eurasian actress of mixed Korean/Russian ancestry, a common practise in North Korean cinema.
- Shark (Kim Duk-sam): a corrupt agent in the Counter Intelligence Corps, who sells information to rival South Korean generals jockeying for power.
- Lee Jin-yong (Kim Yun-hong)
- Wang Soong (Rho Jung-won): A reporter from Taiwan, and son of the secretary of Chiang Kai-shek.
- Knife (Kang Keum-bok)
- Seul-hwa (Park Sub)
- Carl (Larry Allen Abshier): A captain in the US Secret Service.
- Lewis (Jerry Wayne Parrish): An army lieutenant who becomes a communist (and Yu's assistant with some help).
- Arthur (James Joseph Dresnok): a US Army lieutenant colonel and POW camp commander. Appears only in Episode 14.
- Interpreter (Paik Kyung-a)

== Episodes ==
Year	No.	Korean title	English translation	Hanja	McCune–Reischauer	Revised Romanisation
1978	1	《적후에서》	Behind Enemy Lines	《敵後에서》	Chŏkhu esŏ	Jeokhu eseo
1978	2	《적후에서 또 적후에로》	Behind Enemy Lines Again	《敵後에서 또 敵後에로》	Chŏkhu esŏ tto Chŏkhu ero	Jeokhu eseo tto Jeokhu ero
1979	3	《적후에서 홀로》	Alone Behind Enemy Lines	《敵後에서 홀로》	Chŏkhu esŏ Hollo	Jeokhu eseo Hollo
1979	4	《옛성터에서》	In Ancient Ruins	《옛城터에서》	Yessŏngtŏ esŏ	Yesseongteo eseo
1979	5	《금강석》	Diamond	《金剛石》	Kŭmgamsŏk	Geumgamseok
1979	6	《한밤중의 저격사건》	Shooting at Midnight	《한밤中의 狙擊事件》	Hanbamjung'ŭi Chŏgyŏksagŏn	Hanbamjung'eui Jeogyeoksageon
1979	7	《정적속에서의 전투》	Battle in the Midst of Calm	《靜寂속에서의 戰鬪》	Chŏngjŏksok'ŭi Chŏntu	Jeongjeoksok'eui Jeontu
1980	8	《위험한 대결》	A Dangerous Confrontation	《危險한 對決》	Uihŏmhan Taegyŏl	Uiheomhan Daegyeol
1980	9	《안개작전》	Operation Fog	《안개作戰》	Angaejakjŏn	Angaejakjeon
1980	10	《위기》	Peril	《危機》	Uigi	Uigi
1980	11	《일요일에 있은 일》	What Happens on Sunday	《日曜日에 있은 일》	Ilyoil e Issŭn Il	Ilyoil e Isseun Il
1980	12	《웃음속에 비낀 그늘》	The Shade Cast by Laughter	《웃음속에 비낀 그늘》	Usŭmsok e Pikkin Kŭnŭl	Useumsok e Bikkin Geuneul
1980	13	《판문점》	Panmunjeom	《板門店》	Panmunjŏm	Banmunjeom
1980	14	《죽음의 섬》	Island of Death	《죽음의 섬》	Chukŭmŭi Sŏm	Jugeumui Seom
1980	15	《달없는 그밤에》	On That Moonless Night	《달없는 그밤에》	Talŏmnŭn Kŭbam e	Daleomneun Geubam e
1980	16	《전투는 계속된다》	The Battle Continues	《戰鬪는 繼續된다》	Chŏntunŭn Kyesok Toenda	Jeontuneun Gyesok Doenda
1980	17	《유인》	Seduction	《誘引》	Yu'in	Yu-in
1980	18	《운명》	Destiny	《運命》	Unmyŏng	Unmyeong
1981	19	《붉은 저녁노을》	Evening Glow	《붉은 저녁노을》	Polkŭn Chŏnyŏk Noŭl	Bolgeun Jeonyeok No-eul
1981	20	《우리는 잊지 않는다》	We Do Not Forget	《우리는 잊지 않는다》	Urinŭn Ijji Annŭnda	Urineun Ijji Anneunda
