= Jerry Wayne Parrish =

American defector to North Korea (1944–1998)

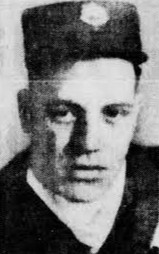
- Born: March 10, 1944; Morganfield, Kentucky, U.S.
- Died: August 25, 1998 (aged 54); Pyongyang, North Korea
- Military career
- Allegiance: United States; North Korea
- Branch: United States Army
- Service years: 1962–1963
- Rank: Corporal

Jerry Wayne Parrish (March 10, 1944 – August 25, 1998), also known by his Korean name Kim Yu-il, was a United States Army corporal who was one of seven American soldiers to defect to North Korea, four of them during the 1960s, in the years after the Korean War.

Parrish was born in Morganfield, Kentucky and was shipped to South Korea as a corporal in the U.S Army. He enlisted in the army at age 18 on September 10, 1962, and shipped to South Korea in February 1963. Following American soldiers Larry Allen Abshier and James Joseph Dresnoks' defections in 1962, Parrish crossed the Demilitarized Zone (DMZ) on December 6, 1963.

Sergeant Charles Robert Jenkins, who in 1965 became the fourth to cross the border, wrote in his autobiography that Parrish's reasons for defecting were "personal, and [Parrish] didn't elaborate about them much except to say that if he ever went home, his father-in-law would kill him." Dresnok stated in his documentary that Parrish had received death threats from his stepfather who had accused him of having sexual relations with his stepsister.

Along with the three other defectors, Parrish was eventually granted citizenship. He married a Lebanese woman, Siham Shraiteh, and together they had three sons (two of them named Michael and Ricky), all of whom remain in North Korea. Jenkins, in his autobiography, claims that Siham and three other young Lebanese women were lured to North Korea under false pretenses, then married to the Americans. However, one of the women had well-connected parents and got all four returned. Siham was already pregnant, so her family sent her back to North Korea. Siham appears in the film Crossing the Line, and vehemently denies the allegations that she was kidnapped or forced to go to North Korea, affirming that she is there by choice. Also according to the film, Parrish died after 20 years of kidney trouble. Siham and their children remain in North Korea.

Parrish, Jenkins, Abshier, and Dresnok were made to play roles in North Korean film productions for their propaganda value, credited using their given Korean names (in Parrish's case this was "Kim Yu-il"). One of them was the 20-film series Unsung Heroes which began production in 1978 and which portrayed a fictionalized version of the Korean War and its antecedents. Since Parrish's character ("Lt. Louis London", a British officer) defected from the West and became a North Korean agent, he was often praised as a genuine Communist hero by average North Koreans.

== See also ==
- List of American and British defectors in the Korean War
