= Crossing the Line (2006 film) =

2006 documentary film by Daniel Gordon

- Region 1 DVD cover
- Directed by: Daniel Gordon; Nicholas Bonner
- Written by: Daniel Gordon
- Produced by: Daniel Gordon
- Narrated by: Christian Slater
- Cinematography: Nick Bennet
- Edited by: Peter Haddon
- Music by: Heather Fenoughty
- Release dates: 16 October 2006 (Pusan International Film Festival); 10 August 2007 (USA)
- Running time: 96 minutes
- Country: United Kingdom
- Languages: English; Korean
- Box office: $9,258 (USA)

Crossing the Line (Korean: 푸른 눈의 평양시민; lit. 'A Blue-Eyed Pyongyang Citizen') is a 2006 British documentary film by Daniel Gordon and Nicholas Bonner. Gordon also wrote the script and produced the documentary.

== Synopsis ==
The film is about a former U.S. Army soldier, James J. Dresnok, who defected to North Korea on 15 August 1962. The documentary shows Dresnok in present-day in Pyongyang (where he lived until his death), interacting with his North Korean family and friends. Dresnok speaks exclusively to the filmmakers about his childhood, his desertion, his life in North Korea, his fellow defectors, and his wife and children. The documentary also features the court martial trial of Charles Robert Jenkins and information about Dresnok's work in the 1978 North Korean miniseries Unsung Heroes. The film presents information about multiple American defectors to North Korea, but focuses primarily on Dresnok.

== Production ==
Daniel Gordon began filming the documentary in 2004, featuring James Dresnok and Charles Robert Jenkins, the last two surviving American defectors in North Korea at the time. The film features the first ever Western interviews with Dresnok since his defection.

== Cast ==
- James Joseph Dresnok
- Charles Robert Jenkins
- Christian Slater as the narrator

== Reception ==
The film was well-received, and has a rating of 90% on Rotten Tomatoes. Writing for Slate, Ed Gonzales said that the documentary was interesting but compromised by the director's aesthetic choices. He additionally criticized the psychoanalysis of Dresnok provided by the film. Additionally, The New York Times criticized the film for its photography and editing.
