= Charles Robert Jenkins =

American Army defector (1940–2017)

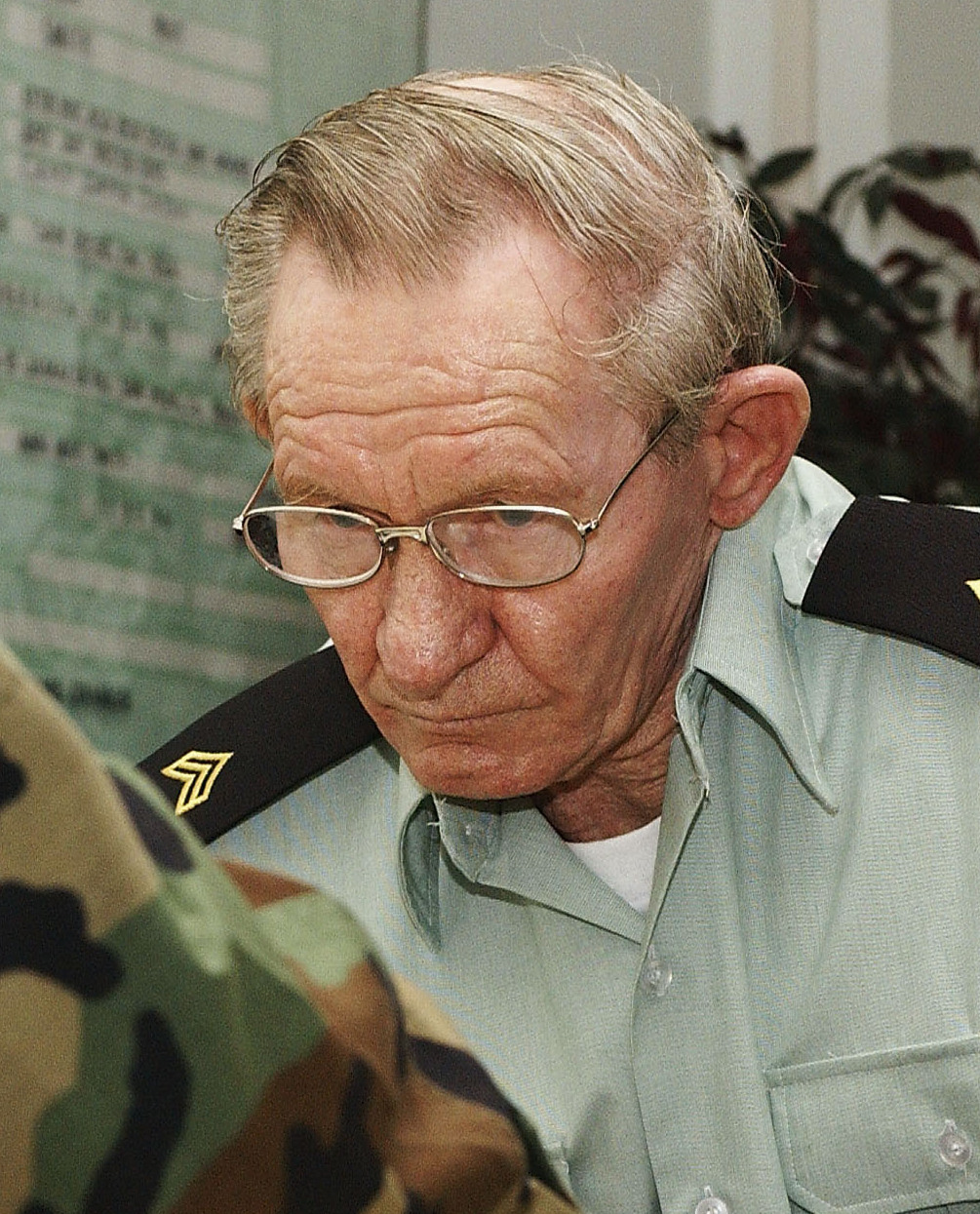
- Jenkins in 2004
- Born: 18 February 1940; Rich Square, North Carolina, US
- Died: 11 December 2017 (aged 77); Sado, Niigata, Japan
- Other name: "Super"
- Citizenship: United States (1940); North Korea (1972)
- Occupations: Soldier; merchant
- Criminal charges: Desertion; Aiding the enemy
- Criminal penalty: 25 days imprisonment
- Spouse: Hitomi Soga (m. 1980)
- Children: 2
- Military career
- Allegiance: United States
- Branch: North Carolina National Guard (1955–1958); United States Army (1958–2005)
- Rank: Private (demoted from Sergeant)
- Units: 7th Infantry Division; 3rd Armored Division; 8th Cavalry Regiment; Fleet Activities Yokosuka
- Known for: Desertion to North Korea

Charles Robert Jenkins (18 February 1940 – 11 December 2017) was a deserter from the United States Army, a North Korean prisoner, and voice for Japanese abductees in North Korea.

Driven by fear of combat and possible service in the Vietnam War, then-Sergeant Jenkins abandoned his patrol and walked across the Korean Demilitarized Zone in January 1965. Instead of being sent to the Soviet Union and then traded back to the US, Jenkins was held captive in North Korea for over 39 years. While kept prisoner, Jenkins was tortured, forced to wed a captured Japanese national, and cast in North Korean propaganda videos.

With improved Japanese–North Korean relations, Jenkins' wife was allowed to visit Japan in 2002, which allowed Jenkins to eventually leave North Korea and arrive in Japan as well. After reporting to Camp Zama in September 2004, Jenkins was court-martialed and served 25 days as an inmate in the brig at United States Fleet Activities Yokosuka. Until his death in 2017, Jenkins lived in his wife's childhood Sado home with her and their two daughters, wrote a book about his experiences in North Korea, worked in a local museum, and was treated like a celebrity by the Japanese.

== Early life ==
Charles Robert Jenkins was born on 18 February 1940 in Rich Square, North Carolina, to Patti Casper Jenkins. He had at least two siblings: a younger sister (Pat) and a younger brother (Stanford). Jenkins dropped out of Rich Square High School—precipitated by either a sports injury or the mid-1950s death of his father—in the seventh grade.

== US Army ==
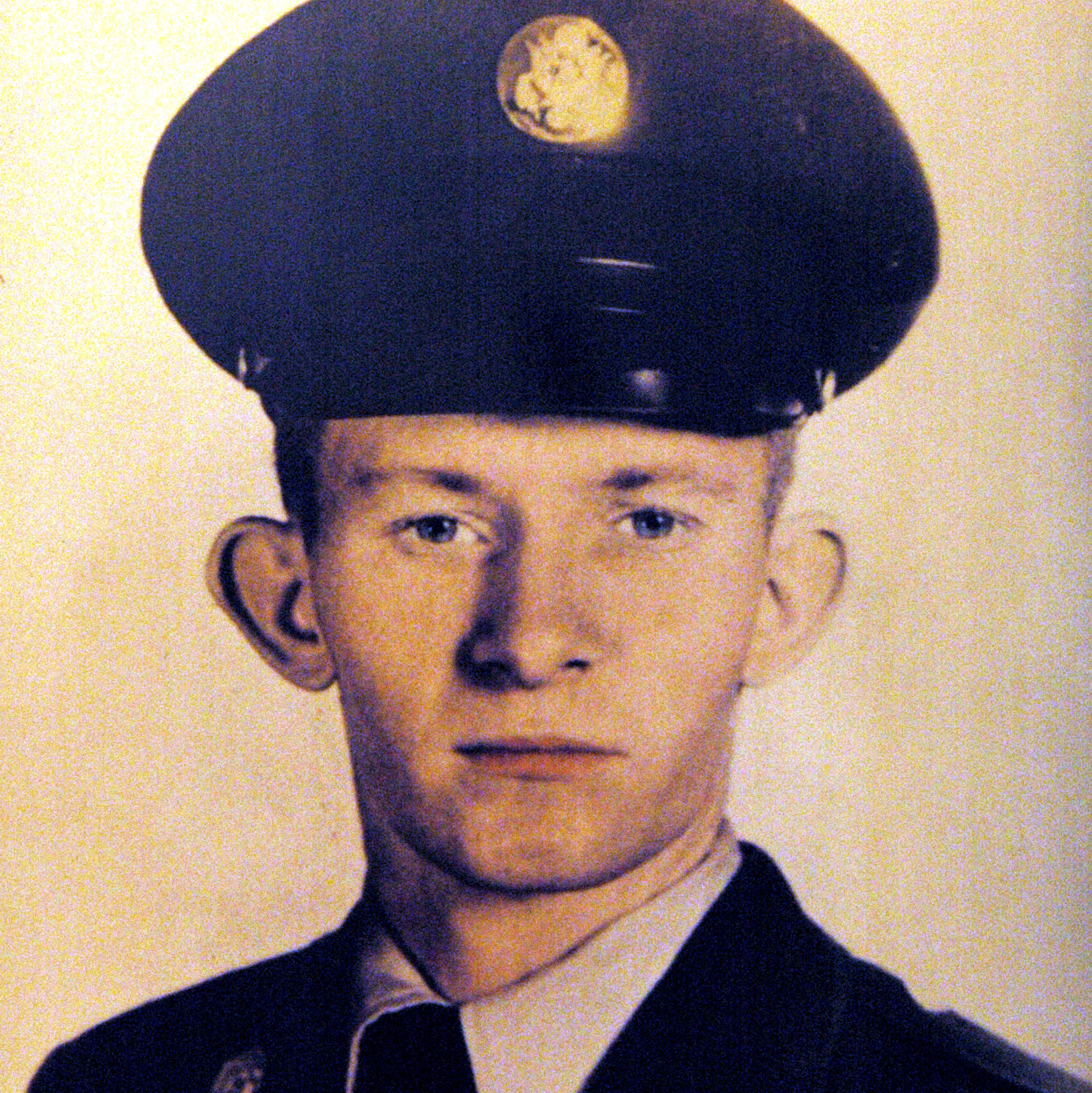
Jenkins in a 1950s Army photo

Lacking a high school diploma, Jenkins enlisted in the North Carolina National Guard from 1955 through April 1958. After his honorable discharge from the Guard, he enlisted in the active-duty United States Army that same year as a light weapons infantryman. First stationed at Fort Hood, Jenkins next volunteered to deploy with the 7th Infantry Division to South Korea from August 1960 through September 1961; while there, he was promoted to sergeant. After briefly returning to the US, Jenkins was assigned to the 3rd Armored Division in West Germany until 1964. That year, he volunteered for a second deployment to the Korean Demilitarized Zone (DMZ).

=== Desertion ===
On 5 January 1965, 24-year-old Sergeant Jenkins was stationed at the DMZ with the Army's 8th Cavalry Regiment when he decided to desert the United States Armed Forces because he had been ordered to lead "more aggressive, provocative patrols", and there were rumors that his unit would be sent to Vietnam. After drinking ten beers to build his courage, Jenkins went on patrol with his squad. At 2:30 am, after telling the other three men that "he heard a noise", Jenkins disappeared into the night approximately ten kilometres (6.2 mi) south of Panmunjom. To show his peaceful intentions, he removed the rounds from his M14 rifle, and tied a white t-shirt to the muzzle before walking for several cold hours towards North Korea. He had planned to claim asylum with the Soviet Union and then return to the US for discharge and punishment via a prisoner exchange. He was instead held prisoner in North Korea for 39 1/2 years.

The Army declared Jenkins a defector based on four letters that he left behind in his barracks; one, addressed to his mother, read: "Forgive me, for I know what I must do. Tell my family I love them. Love, Charles." Jenkins' family disputed this determination because he "always either signed letters 'Robert' or used his nickname 'Super'." In 1996, Jenkins was reclassified by the US military as a deserter. Jenkins' nephew, James Hyman, was a decades-long strident defendant of the theory that his uncle had been kidnapped by North Koreans.

Jenkins would later tell Professor Robert Boynton (of New York University) "that he had been a double-agent, sent to North Korea by the U.S. to spy on them". Boynton disbelieved Jenkins' claim, calling it "his attempt to maintain some dignity, and prove he wasn't just a hapless sap who made a life-altering mistake."

== In North Korea ==
Jenkins was initially housed with fellow US deserters Larry Allen Abshier, James Joseph Dresnok, and Jerry Wayne Parrish. The American men fought amongst themselves, with Jenkins later describing the 6-foot-4-inch (1.93 m) Dresnok as a bully who informed on the others to their captors and beat Jenkins himself. On 26 January 1965, North Korean radio announced that Jenkins had defected there "because of disgust with conditions in South Korea and that he believed life was better under the Communists [sic]." In 1966, the four men attempted escape by seeking asylum at the Soviet embassy in Pyongyang, but were unsuccessful. In 1972, the four were given their own homes and declared citizens, though their "constant surveillance, beatings and torture" continued.

During his imprisonment in North Korea, Jenkins was made to memorize Kim Il Sung's writings and work for the communist state as an English teacher and translator. Jenkins' lessons in American English lasted until 1985 when it was decided that his pronounced Southern accent was more a hindrance than not.

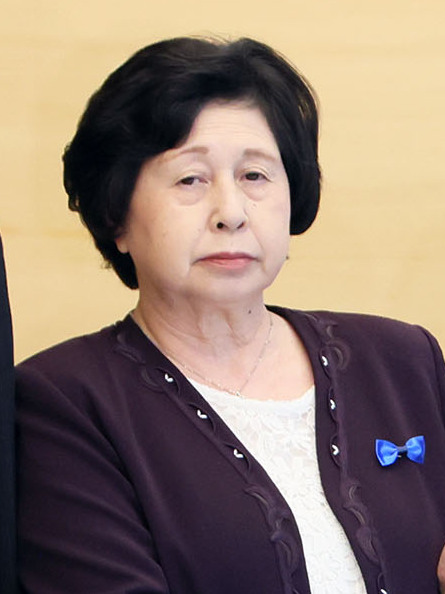
Hitomi Soga in 2023

In 1978, Hitomi Soga (born 1958/1959) was a Japanese student nurse in Sado, Niigata, when she and her mother were kidnapped by North Korean agents and taken to their country to train more agents there. At the direction of the North Korean government, the 21-year-old Soga was assigned to Jenkins in 1980, and they were married weeks later on 8 August. They had two daughters: Mika (born in 1983) and Brinda (born in 1985). An interviewer of Jenkins would later tell The Japan Times that Jenkins' relationship with Soga was remarkable: Jenkins said "several times that she was the best thing that had ever happened to him [...] 'She saved my life,' he told me. I suspect he was right." After their release from North Korea in the early 2000s, Jenkins offered to dissolve their marriage, as it had been imposed upon them; Soga declined.

During the 1990s North Korean famine that killed millions of North Koreans, as an asset for propaganda, Jenkins and his family still received rations of clothing, insect-infested rice, and soap. In their 2004 testimony, Jenkins and Soga told the US Army about their living accommodations in North Korea—or lack thereof. While heat, warm water, and food were scarce, the omnipresent state surrounded them and their home with barbed wire, hidden microphones, and "political supervisors". By the time he left, Jenkins was receiving from the North Korean government a monthly income of US$120 (equivalent to $204.55 in 2025), and his daughters were enrolled at the Pyongyang University of Foreign Studies, possibly for training to infiltrate South Korea.

=== Acting ===
In 1978, production began on the 20-film series Unsung Heroes, which tells the North Korean version of the Korean War and its antecedents. Jenkins was made to play Dr. Kelton, a capitalist warmonger who endeavored to extend the war to benefit the US arms industry. These films made Jenkins a celebrity; he was recognized on the street as "Dr. Kelton!" (Korean: « 켈튼 박사! », romanized: "Kelton Bac-Sa!") and asked to sign autographs. One of these films was delivered to Jenkins' family in 1997—their first sight of Jenkins since his desertion.

Jenkins' last North Korean film was in 2000, about the communists' capture of USS Pueblo, portraying a US aircraft carrier captain. His celebrity status as an alleged-defector-turned-movie-star also afforded him greater social cachet as a state prize, allowing him to see Soviet dignitaries and diplomats who piteously slipped him materials and information from outside North Korea.

== Expatriation ==
Due to the 2002 Japan–North Korea Pyongyang Declaration, Soga was allowed to leave for Japan on 15 October for ten days; she did not return to North Korea. The government of Japan petitioned the US to pardon Jenkins, hoping Japanese Prime Minister Junichiro Koizumi could bring back the American and his daughters after a May diplomatic trip. Ultimately, they refused to leave; because of the U.S.–Japan Status of Forces Agreement, he still faced court-martial if he traveled to Japan—because the statute of limitations for desertion was 40 years (5 January 2005)—and possible capital punishment.

Instead, Pyongyang eventually permitted Jenkins and his daughters to fly to Soekarno–Hatta International Airport in Indonesia, where they reunited with Soga, and the Japanese government promised residency for the whole family. After his release from North Korea, Jenkins was 1.65 metres (5 ft 5 in) tall, and only weighed 100 pounds (45 kg), having lost his appendix, one testicle, and part of a US Army tattoo (cut off without anesthetic) to North Korea. Of the four 1960s deserters to North Korea, he was the only one to ever leave. Upon arrival in Japan from Indonesia, Jenkins spent a month in the hospital at Tokyo Women's Medical University to recover from complications of prostate surgery (performed in North Korea before he left).

=== Court-martial ===
United States v. Jenkins
- USARJ shoulder insignia
- Court: United States Army, Japan
- Decided: 3 November 2004

Court membership
- Judge sitting: Colonel Denise Vowell

On 11 September 2004, he presented himself to Lieutenant Colonel Paul Nigara at Camp Zama, saying with a salute, "Sir, I'm Sergeant Jenkins and I'm reporting". Jenkins' court-martial began and ended on 3 November 2004. He was the longest-missing deserter to return to the US military.

Represented by Captain James D. Culp, Jenkins' single-day court-martial (United States v. Jenkins) was convened by United States Army, Japan on 3 November 2004. Colonel Denise Vowell was judge for the bench trial. In accordance with his pre-trial agreement, Jenkins pled guilty to desertion and aiding the enemy (the latter for teaching English in North Korea). Vowell sentenced him to "six months' confinement, total forfeiture of all pay and allowances, reduction to the lowest enlisted grade, and a dishonorable discharge." Major General Elbert N. Perkins, the general court-martial convening authority, changed the confinement to 30 days, and approved the remainder of the sentence, to be in the brig at United States Fleet Activities Yokosuka—where, Captain King H. Dietriech assured reporters, "there will be no special treatment for Private Jenkins."

Jenkins spent only 25 days in the brig; he was released early for good conduct on 27 November 2004. Having waived "his post-trial and appellate rights", Jenkins' demotion and dishonorable discharge were executed on 18 July 2005. Portions of the court-martial were incorporated into Daniel Gordon's documentary about US servicemembers who defected to North Korea, Crossing the Line.

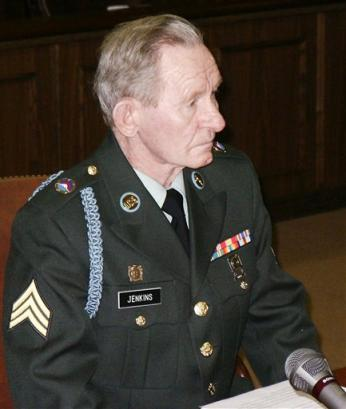
Sergeant Jenkins at court-martial

BBC News reported that Jenkins may have received only a 30-day sentence because of the intelligence he provided. In 2009, Jenkins told Vice that in addition to receiving a sergeant's salary while in prison—a monthly rate of $2,367.90 (equivalent to $4,036 in 2025)—he spent his time working with military intelligence. According to Jenkins, the sentence was

all a big set-up for the outside world so it looked like justice was done. After all, I betrayed my country and people wanted to see me get punished for that – but I was just helping the government with what I knew. They just gave me the shortest sentence possible with a week off for good behaviour so it didn't seem like I was let off the hook.

=== Civilian life ===
After his release from prison, Jenkins lived with his family in Soga's Sado childhood home. In June 2005, he visited the United States with his wife and children. They travelled to his home town of Rich Square, North Carolina, where Charles was reunited with his 91-year-old mother, whom he had not seen in four decades. Jenkins' mother and sister still lived in the state when he expatriated from North Korea. When his mother died at the age of 94, Jenkins again travelled to Rich Square to bury her.

Jenkins continued to fear that agents of Kim Jong Il would retaliate against him in Japan; he was unable to eat sashimi out of fear it would make him sick from the memories; and he was more fluent in Korean than English. To record what he remembered and experienced, Jenkins published a memoir in 2008, The Reluctant Communist. In Japan, Jenkins fostered an interest in motorcycling; he was featured on the cover of Mr. Bike, a Japanese motorcycle-enthusiast magazine.

The Japanese Ministry of Justice expedited Jenkins' application for permanent residency, which was awarded on 15 July 2008. Jenkins worked in Sado selling senbei at a local museum. Treated like a celebrity, he frequently posed for photographs with Japanese patrons, at times up to 300 per hour. In Japan, he was credited with helping bring global attention to the North Korean abductions of Japanese citizens.

On 11 December 2017, Jenkins collapsed outside his Sado home, and later died of cardiovascular disease.

== See also ==
- Roy Chung – American defector to North Korea (c. 1957 – c. 2004)
- Travis King – American soldier and failed defector to North Korea
- Joseph T. White – American defector to North Korea (1961–1985)
