= Operation Big Switch =

Korean War repatriation of prisoners

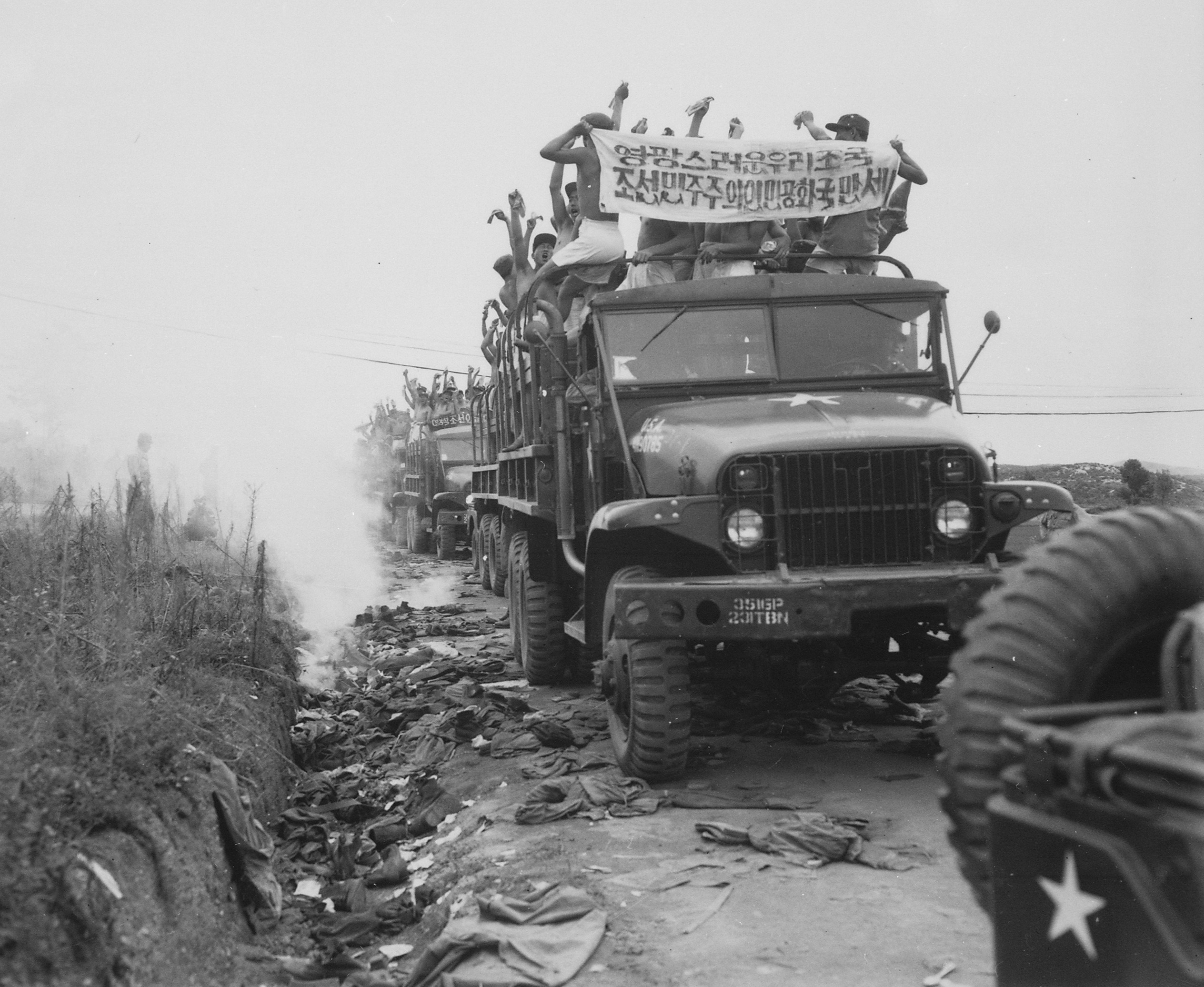
North Korean POWs on US Army trucks during Operation Big Switch. The POWs have ripped off their clothing and strewed it along the road. Some of the clothing is burning. The banner carried by the POWs reads: “Long live our glorious motherland, the Democratic People's Republic of Korea!”

Operation Big Switch was the repatriation of all remaining prisoners of the Korean War. Ceasefire talks had been going on between the North Korean, Chinese and United Nations Command (UNC) forces since 1951, with the main point of contention being the repatriation of all prisoners to their home countries, in accordance with Article 118 of the 1949 Geneva Convention. China and North Korea wanted prisoners to be compulsorily repatriated as outlined by the Geneva Convention but the UNC insisted that prisoners who wished to remain where they were to be allowed to do so. After talks dragged on for two years, the Chinese and North Koreans relented on this point, and the Korean Armistice Agreement was signed on 27 July 1953.

== Negotiations ==
On 28 March 1953, replying to UNC Commander General Mark W. Clark's request for the exchange of sick and wounded prisoners, North Korean leader Kim Il Sung and PVA commander Peng Dehuai said that they were perfectly willing to carry out the provisions of the Geneva Conventions in this respect. On 30 March Zhou Enlai, the Foreign Minister of China, issued a statement urging that both sides "should undertake to repatriate immediately after the cessation of hostilities all those prisoners of war in their custody who insist upon repatriation and to hand over the remaining prisoners of war to a neutral state so as to ensure a just solution to the question of their repatriation." In a letter to Kim and Peng on 5 April, Clark proposed that the liaison officers meet the following day and requested that Kim and Peng furnish the UNC with more particulars on the communist method for disposition of the non-repatriation question. In preparation for the first meeting of the liaison officers on the arrangements for the transfer of the sick and wounded, Clark and his staff formulated a UNC plan. It contemplated that each prisoner to be exchanged would be brought to Panmunjom, furnished with a medical tag on his condition and treatment and given unmarked, serviceable clothing.

On 6 April, Rear Admiral John C. Daniel and General Lee Sang Cho led the liaison officers groups when they gathered at Panmunjom. The UNC was ready to start immediate construction of the facilities necessary for the delivery and receipt of the sick and wounded at Panmunjom and to begin delivery of 500 prisoners a day within seven days of the agreement on procedures. To expedite matters Daniel suggested that each side turn over its lists of names and nationalities of the prisoners to be exchanged and that officers be appointed to discuss administrative details. Lee pointed out that the Communists wanted to repatriate all sick and wounded eligible under Articles 109 and 110 of the Geneva Conventions. On 7 April, Daniel informed the Chinese and North Koreans that the UNC was prepared to repatriate all prisoners eligible under the two articles, subject to the proviso that no individual would be repatriated against his will. Daniel stressed that the UNC would give the broadest interpretation possible to the term "sick and wounded." On 11 April, an agreement was reached that within ten days the exchange at Panmunjom would begin, with the Chinese and North Koreans delivering 100 and the UNC 500 a day in groups of 25 at a time. Rosters prepared by nationality, including name, rank, and serial number would accompany each group and receipts would be signed for a group as it was turned over to the other side.

20 April was established as the date for the start of Operation Little Switch as it was dubbed by the UNC. In preparation for the operation trucks and trains began to transport the PVA and KPA prisoners north from Koje-do and the other offshore islands. On 14 April, twenty-three vehicles left the KPA prison camps with the first contingent of UNC sick and wounded. Five days later the first trainload of PVA/KPA prisoners set out from Pusan to Munsan. But even as the PVA/KPA invalids prepared to go home, they sought to embarrass the UNC. Some refused a new issue of clothing because the letter "P" for prisoner had not been stenciled on the shirts. Others would not permit UNC personnel to dust them with DDT powder. Demonstrations broke out, with chanting and singing, until camp authorities warned the leaders that failure to obey orders would result in loss of their opportunity for repatriation. As the prisoners rode to the waiting Landing Ship, Tank for shipment to the mainland, they threw away their rations of tooth powder, soap, and cigarettes with hand-printed propaganda messages cached inside, charging the United States with "starvation, oppression and barbarous acts against the Korean people." At Pusan they demanded the right of inspection of hospital facilities before they debarked and had to be told they would be forcibly removed unless they complied with instructions. Some of the PVA went on a hunger strike for several meals because they claimed that the food had been poisoned. When the time came for the final train ride from Pusan to Munsan, many of the prisoners cut off buttons, severed the half-belts of their overcoats, and removed their shoelaces in an attempt to create the impression that they had been poorly treated.

As the UNC gathered all of the PVA/KPA prisoners eligible for return, it discovered that there were more than 5,800 who could be repatriated. The question immediately arose whether to include the additional 550 in the exchange or to adhere to the original tally. General Clark felt that the advantages of demonstrating the good faith of the UNC and of possibly spurring the Chinese and North Koreans to increase their total of returnees outweighed the disadvantages of introducing a new figure and his superiors agreed.

== Operation Little Switch ==
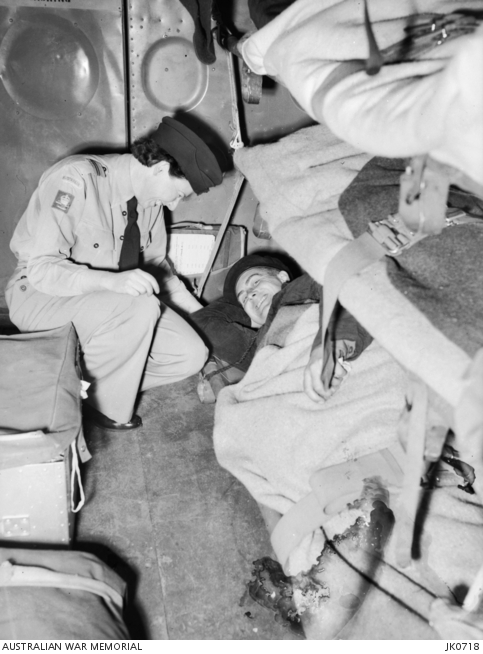
RAAF nurse with injured RSAAF ex-POW on an evacuation flight

Operation Little Switch began on 20 April. When the UNC sick and wounded were delivered to Panmunjom they were rushed back to Munsan for initial processing. Some were then flown to Japan for rest and treatment preparatory to shipment home, while the ROK patients were transferred to base hospitals in South Korea.

On 23 April, the Chinese and North Koreans announced that they would also exceed the 600 figure that they had submitted. Hoping to encourage further relaxation of the standards, the UNC added more enemy prisoners to its list. But on 26 April, General Lee abruptly stated that his side had completed its share of the exchange. When Admiral Daniel protested that evidence in UNC possession showed that there were still about 375 UNC sick and wounded who could be repatriated, Lee termed it a groundless accusation and refused to consider the matter. Faced with an unyielding stand, the UNC on 3 May finished delivering the last group of prisoners that it intended to turn over.

The final tally showed that the UNC had returned 5,194 KPA and 1,030 PVA soldiers and 446 civilian internees, for a total of 6,670. Of these patients 357 were litter cases. In return the Chinese and North Koreans had returned 684 sick and wounded UNC soldiers, including 149 Americans.

== Renewed ceasefire negotiations ==
On 26 April, armistice negotiations resumed at Panmunjom for the first time since October 1952. The lead North Korean negotiator General Nam Il proposed that: (1) Within two months after the armistice agreement became effective, both sides would repatriate all the prisoners desiring to return home; (2) During the following month all non-repatriates would be sent to a neutral state and turned over to its jurisdiction; (3) Then, for a period of six months, the nations to which the non-repatriates belonged should have the opportunity and facilities to talk to and persuade them to come back; (4) All prisoners changing their minds during this time would be repatriated; (5) Disposition of any prisoners remaining in the hands of the neutral state at the end of the six month explaining period would be decided by the political conference provided for in the armistice agreement; and (6) All expenses of the nonrepatriates in the neutral state would be borne by the nation to which the prisoners belonged. The UNC negotiators rejected the six month period saying that 60 days would be adequate and that there was no need for the non-repatriates to be sent out of Korea.

On 7 April, Nam Il submitted a revised proposal dropping the earlier requirement that the non-repatriates be transported physically to the neutral state and reduced the explaining period from six months to four. To handle the non-repatriates, Nam suggested that a Neutral Nations Repatriation Commission (NNRC) with five members - Poland, Czechoslovakia, Switzerland, Sweden, and India be set up. Each of these countries would provide an equal number of armed personnel and would share in the task of maintaining custody of the non-repatriates in their original places of detention. Since the Chinese and North Koreans had yielded on the most objectionable features of their first proposal, President Dwight D. Eisenhower and some of his top political and military advisors met in Washington D.C. to discuss the latest offer. Encouraged by the spirit of compromise reflected in the 7 May plan, they agreed that it represented a significant shift in the enemy position and provided a basis for negotiating an acceptable armistice.

On 12 May, Clark flew to Seoul to meet with South Korean President Syngman Rhee who opposed the armistice negotiations and wanted to continue the war until Korea was reunited. Clark reported to Washington that Rhee was "in dead earnest" about his rejection of the release of the Korean non-repatriates to another state or group of states, particularly if any were controlled by the communists. Rhee also did not consider India to be a neutral state and did not want Indian troops to set foot on any part of South Korea. In the light of Rhee's strong feelings and in sympathy with his position, Clark urged the Joint Chiefs of Staff to allow the UNC delegation to propose that the Korean non-repatriates be released as soon as the armistice was effective. He felt that this would be the only solution to the problem and that the Chinese and North Koreans would accept it if the UNC supported it firmly. Release of the Korean non-repatriates would also lessen the number of custodial personnel required to care for the non-Korean non-repatriates and might eliminate some of Rhee's opposition.

On 13 May, the UNC made its counterproposal that India supply the chairman and operating force of the repatriation commission; that the explaining period be limited to sixty days; and that all non-repatriates remaining at the end of the explaining period be released. Nam rejected this proposal saying that the attempt to secure release of the Korean non-repatriates was "a backward step" and another effort at "forced retention."

On 25 May, after receiving instructions from Washington, the UNC negotiators proposed that they would accept the five-nation custodial arrangement if all armed forces and operating personnel were provided by India. The UNC would discard its insistence upon the immediate release of the Korean non-repatriates when the armistice became effective and instead would agree to turn these prisoners over to the repatriation commission for a period of 90 days. In matters requiring decision by the repatriation commission, the UNC would consent to the Chinese/North Korean argument for a majority vote rather than unanimity. To insure that no threats or coercion were used, limitations were to be imposed upon the number of Chinese/North Korean explainers permitted access to the prisoners. In addition, the UNC observers were to be present at the interviews along with members of the repatriation commission. Lastly, the UNC would agree either to turn disposition of the nonrepatriates over to a political conference with a thirty-day time limit and then release them, or alternatively let the U.N. General Assembly determine their final fate.

On 4 June, the Chinese and North Koreans indicated their agreement to the proposal and effectively acknowledged the principle of no forced repatriation of prisoners and an agreement on prisoners was signed on 8 June.

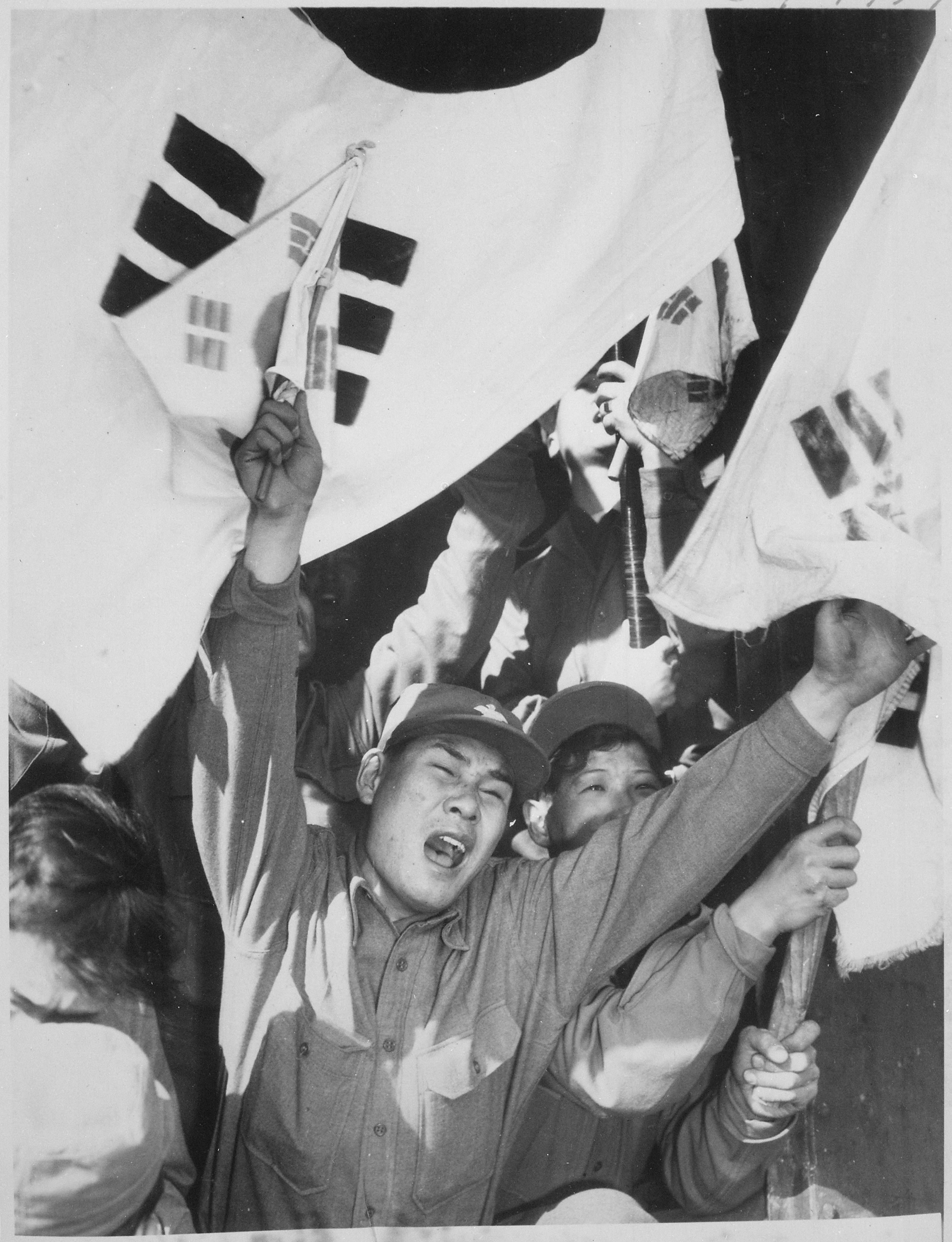
Anti-communist North Korean ex-POW in Seoul

On 18 June, with the active planning and coordination of the South Korean government approximately 25,000 militantly anti-communist KPA prisoners of war broke out of the UNC prisoner of war camps at Pusan, Masan, Nonsan, and Sang Mu Dai. ROK security units assigned as guards at the POW camps did little to prevent the breakouts and there was actual collusion between the ROK guards and the prisoners. On 17 June there had been around 35,400 Korean non-repatriates in the compounds; by the end of the month, only 8,600 remained. 61 prisoners had died and 116 had been injured in the escape attempts. The UNC negotiators immediately informed Nam Il of the breakouts and placed the responsibility squarely on the shoulders of the South Korean Government. But the North Koreans refused to believe that the UNC had not known about the plan in advance and had not "deliberately connived" with Rhee to carry it out. Despite this, they did not threaten to break off negotiations. Clark had to issue a strong statement on 21 June denying that he had known about or abetted the release of the non-repatriates. Although Clark had known that Rhee was in a position to release the non-repatriates at any time, he told the Rhee that he was "profoundly shocked" at the abrogation of the personal commitment that Rhee had previously given him not to take unilateral action involving ROK troops under UNC control without informing Clark. A message from President Eisenhower echoed Clark's charge and intimated that unless Rhee quickly agreed to accept the authority of the UNC to conclude the armistice, other arrangements would be made.

Rhee's intransigence and unilateral release of prisoners caused the PVA and KPA to launch a series of attacks known as the Battle of Kumsong. Clark would later comment "There is no doubt in my mind that one of the principal reasons—if not the one reason — for the Communist offensive was to give the ROK's a 'bloody nose,' to show them and the world that 'PUK CHIN' — Go North was easier said than done."

On 22 June, Clark and Eighth United States Army commander General Maxwell D. Taylor met with Rhee who they felt was tense after the adverse comments of the world press on Rhee's unilateral release of the prisoners. Clark advised that the United States was determined to sign an armistice under honorable terms and would not try to eject the communist troops from Korea by force and that the ROK Army could not fight on its own, offensively or defensively, at the present and needed time to prepare for the assumption of larger tasks. Rhee indicated that despite the fact that he could not sign an armistice, since this would be an admission of the division of Korea, he could support it.

By early July, Rhee had negotiated obtained five main pledges from the United States: 1. the promise of a U.S.-ROK mutual security pact after the armistice; 2. assurance that the ROK would receive long-term economic aid and a first installment of two hundred million dollars; 3. agreement that the United States and the Republic of Korea would withdraw from the political conference after 90 days if nothing substantial was achieved; 4. agreement to carry out the planned expansion of the ROK Army; and 5. agreement to hold high-level U.S.-ROK conferences on joint objectives before the political conferences were held. In return for his agreement not to obstruct the armistice, Rhee abandoned his insistence upon the withdrawal of PVA forces from Korea and for the unification of Korea before the signing of the armistice. He also gave up his objections to the transportation of Korean non-repatriates and Chinese prisoners to the demilitarized zone for the period of explanations, provided that no Indian troops were landed in Korea.

On 10 July, negotiations resumed at Panmunjom, making little progress until the Chinese and North Koreans requested a recess on 16 July with negotiations to restart on 19 July. When negotiations resumed the PVA/KPA attacks at Kumsong were over and the line had stabilized.

On 22 July, the UNC proposed that communist prisoners who did not wish to return home should be turned over to the repatriation commission in the southern part of the demilitarized zone. The North Korean draft permitted each side to use its own half of the demilitarized zone for turning over non-repatriates to the repatriation commission and for establishing the facilities required to handle the prisoners of war.

On 21 July, the UNC advised the Chinese and North Koreans that there would be 69,000 Koreans and 5,000 Chinese returning to their control. On 24 July the UNC advised the number of non-repatriates as 14,500 Chinese and 7,800 Koreans. The Chinese and North Koreans advised that they would be releasing 12,764 prisoners, including 3,313 U.S. and 8,186 South Korean personnel. On 26 July, the UNC advised that it could bring daily to Panmunjom 2,400, plus the 360 sick and wounded, but the North Koreans advised they could turn over only 300 a day because of the paucity of transportation facilities and the fact that the prisoner camps were distant and scattered.

The Korean Armistice Agreement was signed at 10:00 on 27 July at Panmunjom by Nam Il representing the KPA and PVA and Lieutenant General William Harrison Jr. representing the UNC. It would become effective 12 hours later.

== Undertakings ==
Operation Big Switch began on 5 August 1953. The UNC handed over 75,823 prisoners (70,183 North Koreans and 5,640 Chinese). The PVA/KPA repatriated 12,773 UNC POWs (7,862 South Koreans, 3,597 Americans, 945 British, 229 Turkish, 40 Filipinos, 30 Canadians, 22 Colombians, 21 Australians, 12 French, eight South Africans, two Greeks, two Dutch, and one prisoner each from Belgium, New Zealand, and Japan).

On 23 September, 22,604 communist (comprising 7,900 North Koreans and 14,704 Chinese) soldiers, who declined repatriation were handed over to the NNRC. On 24 September, the PVA/KPA handed over more than 350 UNC non-repatriates, comprising 23 Americans and one Briton, along with 333 South Korean UN soldiers to the NNRC.

Between 15 October and 23 December, the explanation period for non-repatriates took place. Large groups of the communist prisoners refused to listen to the PVA/KPA representatives at all. 137 Chinese soldiers chose to return to China. Two Americans and eight South Koreans chose to return to the UNC. 325 Koreans, 21 Americans, and one Briton voluntarily decided to stay with the communists. 21,839 communist soldiers decided to remain in the West. In the early part of 1954, the Korean non-repatriates were released and the Chinese were shipped by plane and boat to Taiwan, except for some 86 who chose to go with the Custodian Force of India when they sailed for home.

== See also ==
- Bert Cumby
- List of American and British defectors in the Korean War
- Operation Glory
