= List of defectors to North Korea after the Korean War =

Following the end of the Korean War in 1953, a small but notable number of individuals from Western and allied nations defected to North Korea, often under circumstances that remain controversial or obscure. This list documents those defectors—primarily military personnel—who crossed into North Korea during the post-war period, highlighting their backgrounds, motivations, and the political context surrounding their decisions. While some were driven by ideological convictions, others cited personal grievances or sought refuge from legal or disciplinary consequences.

Provided below is a comprehensive list of all these defectors:

Image (if applicable)	Name	Nationality/Allegiance	Details	Date	Civilian/Military	Rank (if applicable)
thumbless	Larry Allen Abashier	United States	First American soldier to defect after the war; died in North Korea in 1983.	May 28, 1962	Military	Private
thumbless	James Joseph Dresnok	United States	Defected to avoid court-martial; became a prominent propaganda actor; died in North Korea in 2016.	Aug 15, 1962	Military	Private First Class
thumbless	Jerry Wayne Parrish	United States	Defected due to personal issues; became an English teacher in Pyongyang; died in North Korea in 1998.	Dec 6, 1963	Military	Corporal
thumbless	Charles Robert Jenkins	United States	Defected to avoid Vietnam deployment; allowed to leave for Japan in 2004 with his family; died in 2017.	Jan 4, 1965	Military	Sergeant
	Roy Chung (Chung Ryeu-sup)	Nationality: South Korea Allegiance: United States	Disappeared from his unit in West Germany and surfaced in North Korea; cause disputed (family claims abduction); died around 2004.	June 5, 1979	Military	Private First Class
thumbless	Joseph T. White	United States	Crossed the DMZ by shooting a lock; reportedly drowned in North Korea in 1985.	Aug 28, 1982	Military	Private
	Ra il Ryong	South Korea	South Korean private who defected and requested asylum.	1985	Military	Private
Choe Deok-sin sits on the Right-hand side	Choe Deok-sin	South Korea	High-profile defector who moved to the North with his wife.	1986	Civilian	Foreign Minister of South Korea
	Ryu Mi-yong	South Korea	Choe Deok-sin's wife; became a political figure in the North.	1986	Civilian	N/A
	Oh Kil-nam	South Korea	Defected from Germany but later escaped back to the South; his family remained imprisoned in the North.	1986	Civilian	Economist
	Son Chang-gu	South Korea	An employee at a U.S. Army unit in South Korea who defected.	1988	Civilian	U.S. Army Base Employee
	Paek Hung-ryong	South Korea	Claimed to be a former intelligence agent who defected with his wife.	1996	Civilian	N/A
	Han Kyong-son	South Korea	A boilerman who defected via a third country.	1997	Civilian	Boilerman
	Song Ki-chan	South Korea	Sailed his fishing trawler into a North Korean port.	1998	Civilian	Fisherman
	Yun Song-sik	South Korea	A political activist who defected, citing a desire for reunification.	1998	Civilian	Activist
	Kang Tong-rim	South Korea	Cut a hole in the DMZ fence to defect; later deported back to the South.	2009	Civilian	N/A
	Choe In-guk	South Korea	Son of Choe Deok-sin and Ryu Mi-yong, who went to North Korea to permanently resettle.	2019	Civilian	N/A
	Unidentified Individual	South Korea	Crossed the DMZ into the North; identity has not been widely publicized.	Early 2022	Civilian?	?
	Travis King	United States		Jul 18, 2023	Military	Private Second Class

== See also ==
- South Korean defectors
- Korean Demilitarized Zone
- United States Forces Korea
- List of American and British defectors in the Korean War
- List of North Korean defectors in South Korea
