= List of North Korean defectors in South Korea =

By 2025, 34,537 North Korean defectors had entered South Korea.

== 1950s ==
- 1953
  - No Kum-sok – fighter pilot who flew his MiG-15 to the South. Since this fighter plane was the best the Eastern Bloc had at the time, No's defection was considered an intelligence bonanza and he was awarded a high sum of $100,000 (equivalent to $1,203,358 in 2025) and the right to reside in the United States; his mother had defected two years before in 1951.

== 1960s ==
- 1968
  - Kim Shin-jo – part of a 31-man commando team sent to South Korea to assassinate then-President Park Chung Hee on 21 January. This led to retaliation in what is known as the Silmido incident. After his life was spared, he became a missionary and has written books on how he found inner peace in Christianity.

== 1980s ==
- 1982
  - Yi Han-yong – nephew of Kim Jong Il; shot to death in 1997 in Gyeonggi-do by unknown assailants widely suspected to be North Korean agents. This was variously speculated to be an attempt to silence him after his publication of a tell-all book about Kim Jong Il's private life, revenge for his mother Seong Hye-rang's defection a year earlier, or a warning to fellow defector Hwang Jang-yop. His mother (sister of Song Hye-rim, Kim Jong Il's mistress and mother of Kim Jong-nam) defected to Europe in 1996 while his sister Yi Nam-ok had defected to the South in 1992.
- 1987
  - Kim Hyon-hui – planted the bomb that brought down Korean Air Flight 858 but was extradited to South Korea and ultimately pardoned for her crime after being caught in Bahrain and attempting suicide
- 1989
  - Lee Sang-jo – former North Korean ambassador to the Soviet Union and army general

== 1990s ==
- 1992
  - Kang Chol-hwan – imprisoned in 1977 after his grandparents left for Japan before returning Kang was released ten years later, fled to China alongside his friend and fellow Yodok internee An Hyuk and defected to South Korea in 1992, where he became a prominent human rights activist and a columnist at The Chosun Ilbo.
  - An Hyuk – formerly lived as an expatriate in China and repatriated to North Korea in 1986; however, he was accused of spying and imprisoned at Yodok concentration camp. He was released three years later, fled to China alongside his friend and fellow Yodok internee Kang Chol-hwan and defected to South Korea in 1992.
  - Lee Soon-ok – defected with her son to South Korea via China and Hong Kong after spending seven years in a political prisoner camp at Kaechon
- 1994
  - Cho Myung-chul – economist; in 2012, he was elected as a member of the South Korean National Assembly. From 2022 to 2024, he was the governor of South Pyeongyan province
- 1996
  - Jeong Su-il – North Korean spy captured in 1996 and released in 2000; died in February, 2025.
  - Lee Chul-su - A captain in the 1st Aviation Division of the KPAF before his defection, on May 23, 1996 Lee flew his Shenyang J-6 aircraft over the border to Suwon Air Base, South Korea. He reportedly left behind a wife and two children. Lee was given a reward of 480 million South Korean Won (approx. 400,000 USD). He was promoted to Colonel in the ROKAF in 2010.
- 1997
  - Hwang Jang-yop – former Chairman of the Standing Committee of the Supreme People's Assembly. Hwang is the highest ranking North Korean official to defect. His aide, Kim Dok-hong, defected with him.
  - Jang Yeong-jin – former soldier and the only openly gay North Korean defector
  - Lee Hyeon-seo – defected in 1997, wrote The Girl with Seven Names about her escape from North Korea, and later guiding her family out of North Korea through China and Laos.
  - Yoo Sang-joon – defected to China, later arrived in South Korea and from there helped smuggle his son from China and Mongolia to South Korea
- 1999
  - Yun Myung-chan – former North Korean international footballer and manager of the North Korea national football team
  - Jang Gil-su – fled North Korea at the age of 15 and became famous in South Korea following publication there and in the U.S. media of his crayon drawings, which depict abuses by North Korean authorities against North Korean civilians
  - Park Sang-hak – worked in a propaganda unit of the Kim Il-sung Socialist Youth League until his family fled to South Korea. His work to spread information into North Korea resulted in an assassination attempt in 2011; participated in the Oslo Freedom Forum in 2009 and has released balloons from South Korea through Fighters for a Free North Korea resulting in multiple arrests
  - Kim Seong-min – defected in 1997 after he was accused of espionage and sentenced to death and arrived in South Korea in 1999; founded Free North Korea Radio

== 2000s ==
- 2001
  - Choi Kwang-hyouk – defected after his left leg was amputated below the knee by doctors following a train accident. He won the bronze medal in para ice hockey at the 2018 Winter Paralympics.
- 2002
  - Kyong Won-ha – chief scientist of North Korea's nuclear program who defected to the West and took with him many of the secrets of the atomic program pioneered since 1984. He was one of 20 scientists and military officers who were smuggled out of North Korea during the alleged Operation Weasel.
  - Jin Gyeong-suk – arrived in South Korea in 2002. She was abducted two years later and forcefully deported back to North Korea where she was tortured and died in custody in January 2005.
  - Joo Seong-ha – currently a journalist with The Dong-A Ilbo
  - Kim Cheol-woong – classically trained musician who has performed in the U.S.
  - Jeong Kwang-il – former prisoner who currently smuggles films, soap operas, and entertainment on DVDs and USB thumb drives (some of which contain an offline copy of Wikipedia) into North Korea
- 2004
  - Mun Ki-nam – former international footballer and manager of both the North Korea women and North Korea men's national football teams
  - Jang Jin-sung – psychological warfare officer within the United Front Department of the Workers' Party of Korea
- 2005
  - Shin Dong-hyuk – defector and author notable for giving testimony on North Korean living conditions to the United Nations. In 2015, he confessed to lying about many aspects of his life in North Korea.
- 2006
  - Ji Seong-ho – human rights activist; in 2020, he was elected as a member of the South Korean National Assembly.
- 2007
  - Li Gyong-hui – former Olympic gymnast
- 2009
  - Yeonmi Park – best-selling author and prominent activist among American conservatives, described as being "one of the most famous North Korean defectors in the world". Journalistic investigations by The Diplomat and The Washington Post concerning Park's stories of life in North Korea charged that she had embellished and even fabricated many of her claims about North Korea.

== 2010s ==
- 2012
  - Jeong Haneul – former Korean People's Army soldier that became a YouTuber and film director in South Korea.
- 2013
  - Hyuk – member of South Korean boy band 1Verse. Hyuk was contacted by his mother who requested he join her in South Korea, and he undertook a six-month journey through several countries to escape, arriving in Seoul, South Korea, at age 13.
- 2014
  - Lim Ji-hyun – became a popular television personality after defecting to South Korea but went missing in 2017 before resurfacing in a series of North Korean interviews, prompting fears she had been abducted and returned to the country.
  - Kim Kuk-Song - the pseudonym of a senior colonel in the North Korean intelligence service who defected after fearing he would be the victim of a purge following the execution of Jang Song-thaek.
- 2015
  - Pak Sung-won – member of the Supreme People's Assembly and army general
  - Kim Kuk-sung – colonel from North Korea's Reconnaissance General Bureau; South Korean authorities said that he had been responsible for supervising espionage efforts against the South. Senior-level defections are rare, though no motive was released regarding this defection.
- 2016
  - Lee Chul-eun – former high-ranking government official working for the North Korean Ministry of State Security who defected to South Korea with a friend by swimming across the Yellow Sea
  - Tae Yong-ho – North Korean deputy ambassador to the United Kingdom who defected with his wife and children; in 2020, he was elected as a member of the South Korean National Assembly.
  - Ri Jong-yol – defected in Hong Kong while participating in the International Mathematical Olympiad as part of North Korea's national team. He stayed in the South Korean embassy for 80 days before China allowed him to travel to South Korea.
- 2017
  - Oh Chong-song – soldier who fled North Korea at the Joint Security Area on 13 November 2017. North Korean soldiers fired over 40 rounds at Oh and he was struck five times. He survived the shooting, was rescued by South Korean soldiers, and his condition was stabilised at a South Korean hospital after treatment for bullet wounds and multiple intestinal parasitic worms.
  - Han Jin Myung – North Korean ambassador to Vietnam
  - Charles Ryu – fled to China in 2008, was arrested and sent to a labour camp. Fled to Thailand before being granted asylum status and moved to the US
- 2018
  - Jo Song-gil – North Korean ambassador to Italy
- 2019
  - Seok – member of South Korean boy band 1Verse. He defected to South Korea in 2019 after several of his uncles had done so. He had been a football player in North Korea, but gave up the sport after defecting.
  - Ryu Hyun-woo – North Korean ambassador to Kuwait

== 2020s ==
- 2020
  - Kim Woo-joo – former gymnast who scaled a barbed wire fence and surrendered to South Korean soldiers. Despite the border being heavily monitored and fortified, it was determined that some of the motion sensors had loose screws that caused them to fail to detect Kim as he crawled past; the incident prompted a review of all sensors along the DMZ. In 2022, he crossed back into North Korea, again via the DMZ.
- 2023
  - Ri Il-gyu – senior North Korean diplomat stationed in Cuba who defected with his wife and children in November, becoming the highest-ranking diplomat from the country to flee since 2016.

== See also ==
- North Koreans in South Korea
- South Korean defectors
