= Korean defectors =

Below are articles related to defectors of North and South Korea.

- North Korean defectors, often going to South Korea
  - North Koreans in South Korea
- South Korean defectors (to North Korea)

== See also ==
- List of North Korean defectors in South Korea
- North Korea–South Korea relations
