= Patriotic Martyrs' Cemetery =

North Korean cemetery in Pyongyang

- Interactive map of Patriotic Martyrs' Cemetery

Details
- Established: September 17, 1986; 39 years ago
- Location: Hyongjesan-guyok, Pyongyang
- Country: North Korea
- Coordinates: 39°8′14″N 125°43′39″E
- Type: Public cemetery
- Patriotic Martyrs' Cemetery
- Chosŏn'gŭl: 애국렬사릉
- Hancha: 愛國烈士陵
- Revised Romanization: Aeguk Ryeolsareung
- McCune–Reischauer: Aeguk Ryŏlsarŭng

The Patriotic Martyrs' Cemetery (Korean: 애국렬사릉) is a national cemetery in Sinmi-ri, Hyongjesan-guyok, Pyongyang, North Korea. Founded on September 17, 1986, it is officially reserved for people who contributed to the "liberation of the country" and "socialist construction". Buried here are many veterans of the Korean independence movement, army and national officials, and outstanding citizens in the fields of science, medicine, and literature.

== Burials ==
Among those interred here are:

=== A ===
- An Woo Saeng (안우생; 安偶生; 1907–1991), poet and activist.

=== C ===
- Cho Ki-chon (조기천; 趙基天; 1913–1951), poet
- Cho So-ang (조소앙; 趙素昻; 1887–1958), independence activist
- Cho Wan-gu (조완구; 趙琬九; 1881–1952), independence activist
- Choe Deok-sin (최덕신; 崔德新; 1914–1989), politician
- Choe Pong Man, contributed to development of Workers' Party of Korea while in the Central Committee of the Workers' Party of Korea.
- Choi Hong Hi (최홍희; 崔泓熙; 1918–2002), general and deportist
- Choe Tong-oh (최동오; 1889–1963), independence activist
- Choi Seung-hee (최승희; 崔承喜; 1911–1969), dancer

=== H ===
- Hyon Chol-hae (현철해; 玄哲海; 1934 – 2022), military officer
- Han Sorya (한설야; 韓雪野; 1900–1976), writer
- Hong Myong-hui (홍명희; 洪命熹; 1888–1968), writer
- Hong Si Hak (홍시학), councillor in mining industry
- Hwang Jin Yong (황진영; 1959-2025); composer

=== J ===
- Jon Hui-jong (전희정; 全熙正; 1930–2020), former vice-minister of Foreign Affairs
- Jon Ku Gang(전구강) (1947? – 2021), the first female general of the Korean People's Army.
- Jong Myong Hak (정명학), dedicated life to strengthening Workers' Party of Korea

=== K ===
- Kim Kwang Suk (1964–2018) – People's Artist of the DPRK, Singer of the Pochonbo Electronic Ensemble.
- Kim Chang-sop (김창섭; 金昌燮; 1946–2020), general
- Kim Ki-nam (김기남, 1929-2024), politician
- Kim Yong Chun (김영춘; 金永春; 1936–2018), politician and general
- Kim Yong-nam (김영남; 1928–2025), president of the Presidium of the Supreme People's Assembly (1998–2019) and minister of foreign affairs (1983–1998)
- Kang Yang Wook (강량욱; 康良煜; 1903–1983), Presbyterian minister and politician
- Kang Chang-Soo (강창수; 姜昌秀) a.k.a Hideo Nakamura (中村 日出夫; 1913–2013), Korean-born Karateka
- Kang Jang-ho (강장호), director of KPA art studio
- Kang Song-san (강성산), worked to develop the country.
- Kim Kyu-sik (김규식; 金奎植; 1881–1950), independence activist
- Kim Ok-song (김옥성; 1916–1965/66), composer
- Kim Pyong Hwa (김평화), contributed to development of orchestra in North Korea.
- Kye Ung Sang (계응상; 桂應祥; 1893–1967), geneticist
- Kim Seryun (김세련, 1928–1998), screenwriter and comedian

=== M ===
- Mu Chong (무정; 武亭; 1904–1951), general

=== O ===
- Om Hang-sop (엄항섭; 嚴恒燮; 1898–1962), independence activist
- O Mi-ran (오미란; 1954-2006), famous actress

=== P ===
- Pak In Yong (박인용), former general of the Korean People's Army.
- Paek Nam-sun (백남순; 白南淳; 1929–2007), Minister of Foreign Affairs
- Paek Nam-un (백남운; 白南雲; 1894–1979), economist
- Park Yun-gwan (박윤관), dedicated life to strengthening Workers' Party of Korea
- Pak Se-yong (박세영; 朴世永; 1902–1989), writer of the lyrics to Aegukka
- Pyon Ung Hui (편웅희), architectural engineer

=== R ===
- Ra Myong Hui (라명희), Hero of the DPRK
- Ri Hyon-sang (리현상; 李鉉相; 1905–1953), independence activist, politician
- Ri Jae-il (리재일; 李在一; 1935–2021), politician
- Ri Ki-yong (리기영; 李箕永; 1895–1984), novelist
- Ri Kuk-ro (리극로; 李克魯; 1893–1982), independence activist
- Ri Myon-sang (이면상; 李冕相; 1908–1989), composer/conductor
- Ri Sung-gi (리승기; 李升基; 1905–1996), chemist
- Ri Yong Ho, (리영호; 李永鎬; 1910-1978), commander of the 3rd Division then later the 7th Corps during the Korean War, Hero of the DPRK
- Ryu Dong-ryol (류동열; 柳東說; 1879–1950), independence activist
- Ryu Mi-yong (류미영; 柳美英; 1921–2016), politician

=== S ===
- Sin Un-ho (신운호), officer of KPA
- Son Chang Gu (손창구), hospital section chief

=== U ===
- U Chi-son (우치선; 于致善; 1919–2003), ceramic artist

=== Y ===
- Yon Hyong-muk (연형묵; 延亨默; 1931–2005), politician
- Yun Ki-sop (윤기섭; 尹琦燮; 1887–1959), independence activist

== See also ==
- Kumsusan Palace of the Sun
- Revolutionary Martyrs' Cemetery
- Memorial Museum of Combat Feats at the Overseas Military Operations
- Cemetery for North Korean and Chinese Soldiers
- Daejeon National Cemetery
- Seoul National Cemetery
