= Song Yo-chan =

South Korean politician (1918–1980)

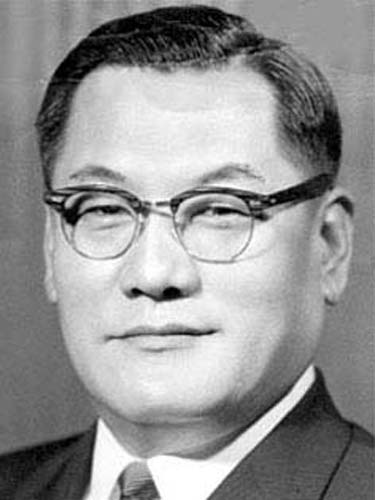
- Song Yo-chan c. 1960

Acting Prime Minister of South Korea (Note: As 2nd Chief Cabinet Minister of the Supreme Council for National Reconstruction.)
- In office July 3, 1961 – June 15, 1962
- President: Yun Posun
- Preceded by: Chang Do-yong (acting)
- Succeeded by: Park Chung Hee (acting)

12th Minister of National Defense
- In office June 12, 1961 – July 10, 1961
- President: Yun Po-sun
- Prime Minister: Himself; Chang Do-yong; Park Chung Hee
- Preceded by: Shin Eung-gyun
- Succeeded by: Park Byung-kwon

8th Minister of Foreign Affairs
- In office July 22, 1961 – October 10, 1961
- President: Yun Posun
- Preceded by: Kim Hong-il
- Succeeded by: Choe Deok-sin

Personal details
- Born: February 13, 1918 Cheongyang County, Chūseinan Province, Korea, Empire of Japan
- Died: October 18, 1980 (aged 62) Chicago, Illinois, United States
- Party: None (military regime)
- Other political affiliations: Liberal Democratic Party
- Spouse: Kwon Young-gak
- Children: 2 boys and 2 girls
- Education: George Washington University
- Nickname(s): "General Seokdu" "Tiger Song"

Military service
- Allegiance: Empire of Japan; South Korea
- Branch/service: Imperial Japanese Army (1938–1945); Republic of Korea Army (1945–1961)
- Years of service: 1938–1961
- Rank: Sergeant (Japan); Lieutenant General (South Korea)

Korean name
- Hangul: 송요찬
- Hanja: 宋堯讚
- RR: Song Yochan
- MR: Song Yoch'an

Song Yo-chan (Korean: 송요찬; February 13, 1918 – October 18, 1980) was prime minister (Chief Cabinet Minister - Military Rule) of South Korea from 3 July 1961 to 16 June 1962. Previously, he had been the head of the Ministry of Foreign Affairs and Trade from 22 July 1961 – 10 October 1961 and was a lieutenant general. He ordered the arrest of corrupt officers in the army. He had studied politics and economics at George Washington University in Washington, D.C. During the final days of the First Republic of South Korea of president Syngman Rhee, he declared martial law and demanded the resignation of Rhee. Song Yo-chan refused to quell student-led protesters even though the police asked for bullets and troops. These protests are known as the April Revolution.

== Early life ==
=== Education and background ===
Song was born on February 13, 1918, in Cheongyang County, Chūseinan Province, Korea, Empire of Japan (now South Chungcheong Province, South Korea). He was the second of two brothers and 6 daughters. He attempted to get a job during 6th grade in 1929, but his mother prohibited him from doing so. After his father died, he transferred between 2 schools, stopping at Daejeon Middle School. After graduating from Daejeon Middle School, he entered the Hermitage of Mount Kumgang and studied for 2 years, but gave up halfway and returned to his hometown.

=== Colonial Period activities ===
During the Second Sino-Japanese War, he was a former Japanese Army volunteer. In April 1939, he volunteered for the Army Volunteer Corps, and in May he received his recruit training at the Army Volunteer Training Center and became a conscript of the Imperial Japanese Army. He was later promoted to Private First class and adopted the Japanese name Sadao Nakamura (中村貞夫) at the end of 1940.

After completing the Volunteer Corps Training Center, he served for 4 years as an assistant at the Army Support Corps Training Center. He was made the military assistant of the Volunteer Corps Training Center. In 1944 he was assigned to the 23rd Regiment of the Korean Army under the Korean Military Command stationed in Yongsan, and in January 1945 he was promoted to sergeant and assigned to the position of Assistant Training Officer of the 23rd Regiment. He was discharged at the end of the war after the Japanese pulled out of Korea.

== Career ==
=== Police Administration Bureau career ===
In August 1945, his old rank transferred to the newly formed Police Administration Department(the precursor to the National Police Agency), and immediately after the restoration of the equivalent of his old rank, he decided to continue his career there, and so he visited and consulted Choi Kyung-rok, a member of the 4th Battalion of the former Japanese Korean Army, before entering the Military Language School. After graduating at the top of his class from the Military Language School in February 1946, he was commissioned as a Police Lieutenant on May 1 of that year. He was part of a network of former Japanese Korean volunteers in the military, and he held contempt for all the other networks such as the Kwantung Army network and the Manchurian Army network. Shortly after his so-called appointment, he was appointed platoon leader of Company A of the 5th Regiment of the Busan Police Administration Bureau garrison. He learned English on his own and was later able to communicate with U.S. military advisers.

=== Armed Forces career ===
When the ROK Armed Forces were formed on August 15, 1948, he immediately transitioned to serving in the Republic of Korea Army.

As captain of the Gangneung Battalion, he was responsible for the defense of the front lines around the 3rd and 8th Lines until June 1948. Later, he was promoted to captain in the 8th Regiment through the head of the Student Regiment of the Infantry School stationed in Siheung County, and then was promoted to major after transferring to the 9th Regiment, which was reorganized in Jeju in July 1948. At the time he was serving with the 9th Regiment, he participated in the suppression of the "Jeju uprising" in Jeju Island, and became the deputy commander of the 11th Regiment when he was transferred to Jeju Island. In the process, it was said he took part in the slaughtering of protestors. After the suppression of the incident, he participated in the pursuit of the Partisans of the Workers' Party of South Korea who were active in Jirisan, etc.

In July 1948, he was appointed the principal of the Republic of Korea Army Infantry School stationed in Gyeonggi Province, promoted to Lieutenant Colonel in January 1949, participated again in the suppression of the Jeju uprising, participated in the suppression of the Odaesan Partisan Offensive, was appointed Commander of the 1st Regiment of the ROK Army in June, killed 1,000 Partisan airmen near there, and wiped out the rest of the partisans.

=== Korean War ===
On 16 April 1950, he was appointed Commander of the Republic of Korea Military Police. At the beginning of the Korean War, he was tasked with managing the paratroopers in the rear area, and on August 10 he assumed the post of Commander of the Daegu Metropolitan City's District Defense Command. On 1 September, he was transferred to Command the Monk Division, and won seven engagements against the Korean People's Army from 7 September. Song was promoted to Brigadier General on 20 September and became the head of the Capital Guard Division on 27 September. He then set up a campaign to bomb and capture Wonsan, Hamhung, and Chongjin. On July 12, 1952, he was appointed Commander of the Southern District Guards. When U.S. President Dwight D. Eisenhower visited South Korea in December 1952, he inspected his division.

=== Post-Korean War ===
Song then served as deputy division commander of the 8th Mechanized Infantry Division, promoted to major general, then made commander of the 8th Mechanized Infantry Division, where he studied in the United States in July 1953 and graduated from the United States Army Command and General Staff College. He returned home in August 1954, was promoted to lieutenant general in October of that same year, then again reappointed the head of the 8th Mechanized Infantry Division, then made head of the 3rd Corps, and later in July 1956 he again traveled to the United States, where he conducted 1 month of local inspections and returned home in August.

He entered the Graduate School of Defense in August 1956, completing it by May of '57. He was appointed commander of the 1st Field Army in May 1957 and Chief of Staff of the Republic of Korea Army in August 1959.

=== April Revolution ===
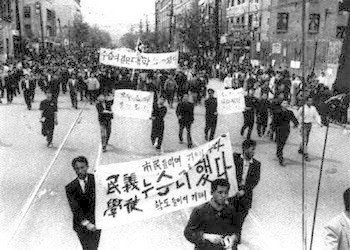
The April Revolution.

During his tenure as Chief of Staff of the Republic of Korea Army, he constantly demanded that President Syngman Rhee improve the treatment of soldiers who had been organized into the Republic of Korea Army's 100,000 Member Reduction plan and the establishment of a pension system. He also served as the Martial Law Commander in the Seoul area in March 1960, and when the demonstrations of student protesters protesting the March 1960 South Korean presidential election results escalated to the April Revolution, he visited Gyeonggi Province on April 20, 1960, at the call of President Syngman Rhee, to plan a redress of the situation.

During the April Revolution, he met with student demonstrators protesting the March 1960 South Korean presidential election in Seoul, and suppressed the uprising. Later, he disclosed the military's intention to neutralize the media, acted passively in the suppression, and focused on preventing bloodshed, maintaining policing, and rectifying chaos.

In May 1960, he resigned from his position as Chief of Staff of the Republic of Korea Army and went to the United States to study for 1 year. During his visit to Washington, D.C., in May 1961, Song received news of the May 16 coup.

== Rise and decline ==
=== May 16 coup ===
After the May 16 coup, he was appointed a member of the Supreme Council for National Reconstruction, then Minister of Foreign Affairs, and on July 3 he was appointed acting Prime Minister of South Korea(as Chief Cabinet Minister of the Supreme Council for National Reconstruction, succeeding Chang Do-yong, who had recently been ousted from power for being perceived as being "too weak." Song served as the de facto Prime Minister of South Korea for one year. During this time, he participated in the revision of the 1st Economic Development Plan. In March 1962 he was appointed Director of the Economic Planning Board. In the wake of the 1962 stock market crash wave, after a conflict with the Supreme Council for National Reconstruction, on 10 June 1962 he resigned from his posts of Prime Minister of South Korea and Minister of Economic Planning on 17 June in opposition to monetary reform, and joined the opposition movement and formed a political party. He resigned from the posts of Prime Minister, and Director of the Economic Planning Board, and then he urged the military government to transfer power back to civilian politicians and return to the military after the redress of the situation due to the revolutionary pledge, and after receiving criticism from Kim Hyun-chul, he fought back against these accusations.

=== Fall from power ===
In August 1963, he was temporarily hospitalized due to kidney disease, and on August 8, the Dong-A Ilbo wrote, "It is patriotic for this soldier to focus only on national defense and for Chairman Park Chung Hee to step down." An open letter was published to the chairman of the Supreme Council for National Reconstruction, Park Chung Hee, and at 11:30 pm on August 11, he was with his family at his home in Sindang-dong, and was suddenly arrested on suspicion of murdering a teacher by an agent of the Korean Central Intelligence Agency. According to the arrest warrant issued by Judge Won Jong-baek of the Seoul Criminal District Court, enforced by the Korean Central Intelligence Agency on the morning of August 11, 1953. On October 5, 1950, the year the Korean War broke out, Colonel Song Yo-chan, then commander of the religious division, commanded the military police to fire at a former subordinate, Lieutenant Colonel Yong-gu, 2nd Battalion, 17th Regiment, 2 km south of the temple Bulguksa in Gyeongju for disobeying orders. Lieutenant Colonel Yong-gu then submitted a complaint and requested a re-investigation. An arrest warrant was issued for the reason that he ordered the demonstration team to fire in front of the house (during the incident that was not confirmed at all and was not even prosecuted at the revolutionary trial immediately after the April Revolution). Song was then arrested and taken to Mapo Prison.

=== 1963 South Korean presidential election ===
After his release from prison, he ran as a candidate for the newly formed Liberal Democratic Party in the 5th presidential election to be held in December, but on October 7, 1963, he announced his resignation as a presidential candidate through lawyer Tae Yoon-gi, saying, "I am resigning to realize a single opposition party candidate." Prosecutor Yoo Tae-sun of the Seoul District Prosecutor's Office said, "On September 15, 1950, when he commanded the battle of Gyeongju with the rank of major general, he was fighting for the army as a commander in an urgent situation where the allies were struggling, so his subordinate battalion commander Jo Yong-gu was summarily disposed of. It is difficult to reveal the murderous intentions against the lieutenant colonel, and even if the charges are confirmed, the circumstances will be taken into account in consideration of the latter."

== Final years and death ==
After winning the trial, he then served as the President of Incheon's Dongkuk Steel Mill. In 1966, he also participated in an interview with people filming a documentary called "The State of the Facts", which described the lives of past opposition politicians.

In 1980, he was appointed as a member of the National Advisory Committee.

After living in Sindang-dong, Seoul, he moved to Gyeonggi Province. After serving as the President of Dongkuk Steel Mill, his kidney disease worsened. On August 20, 1980, he moved to the United States and was admitted to Loyola University Hospital in Chicago, but fell into a coma within three days.

He died of kidney disease on October 18, 1980, in the Loyola University Hospital of Chicago. He was 62 at the time of his death.

On October 25, 1980, after a funeral ceremony as an army commander in the army headquarters auditorium, he was buried under the graveyard of his father Song Yeong-dal, who lived in Cheongyang County, South Chungcheong Province.

== Honors ==
- Order of Military Merit Eulji Class, awarded twice.
- Taegeuk Class Military Merit Medal, awarded twice.
- U.S. Silver Star Medal, awarded in May, 1953.
- Grand Order of Mugunghwa, awarded on October 25, 1980.
