= Ryu Hyun-woo =

Ryu Hyun-woo may refer to:

- Ryu Hyun-woo (golfer) (born 1981), South Korean professional golfer
- Ryu Hyun-woo (diplomat), North Korean ambassador to Kuwait
