= Sang-jun =

- Hangul: 상준
- RR: Sangjun
- MR: Sangjun

Sang-jun, also spelled Sang-joon, is a Korean given name.

People with this name include:

- Cho Sang-jun (born 1999), South Korean footballer
- Ji Sang-jun (born 1973), South Korean swimmer
- Lee Sang-joon (born 1992), South Korean badminton player
- Lee Sang-jun (footballer) (born 1999), South Korean footballer
- Park Sang-joon (born 1974), South Korean table tennis player
- Yang Sang-jun (born 1988), South Korean football player
- Yoo Sang-joon, North Korean defector

Fictional characters with this name include:

- Han Sang-jun, in 2006 South Korean film 200 Pounds Beauty
- Yoo Sang-joon, real name of Baek San, in 2009 South Korean television series Iris and its 2013 sequel Iris II

== See also ==
- List of Korean given names
