= North Korean Defectors' Day =

South Korean holiday celebrated on July 14

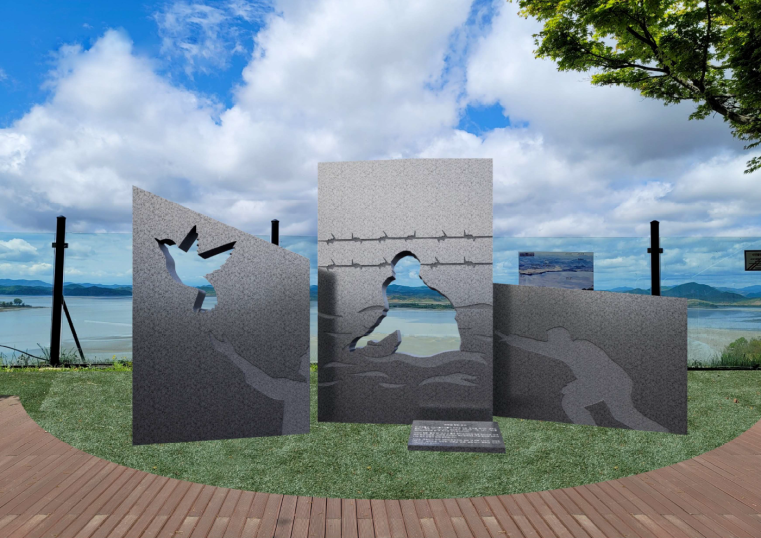
- "Courage for Freedom" monument erected on the first North Korean Defectors' Day on July 14, 2024
- Observed by: South Korea
- Type: Cultural
- Observances: Commemoration of North Korean defectors in South Korea
- Date: July 14
- Frequency: Annual
- First time: July 14, 2024
- Started by: Yoon Suk Yeol

Korean name
- Hangul: 북한이탈주민의 날
- Hanja: 北韓離脫住民의 날
- RR: Bukhan ital juminui nal
- MR: Pukhan it'al chuminŭi nal

North Korean Defectors' Day (Korean: 북한이탈주민의 날) is a holiday celebrated on July 14 in South Korea to commemorate North Korean defectors that have resettled there. Established in 2024, it is celebrated with art, music, food, and other symbols of both North Korean and South Korean culture.

== History ==
The holiday was established in 2024 by South Korean president Yoon Suk Yeol to commemorate the twenty-seventh anniversary of the North Korean Defectors Protection and Settlement Support Act, which had been enacted in 1997. There are over 34,000 defectors from North Korea living in South Korea, and the holiday was intended to be representative of Yoon's policies surrounding Korean reunification. Yoon stated that Korean unification was dependent on human rights advancements in North Korea, and that North Koreans should be able to successfully integrate into South Korean society.

North Korean defectors often face difficulty integrating into South Korean culture due to factors such as culture shock and hostility from South Koreans towards defectors. North Korean defectors in South Korea face more than double the national rate of unemployment. The establishment of North Korean Defectors' Day was presented as an opportunity to create a more welcoming environment for North Koreans in the South, although some analysts have criticized the initiative, as it could unintentionally create the opposite effect by reminding North Koreans that they are considered "outsiders" by South Korean society.

The first North Korean Defectors' Day festival was held in Seoul on July 14, 2024, and was attended mostly by North Korean defectors, although some native-born South Koreans attended as well. The festival included performances of North Korean music, as well as displays of North Korean items brought to South Korea by defectors. Defector entrepreneurs also sold goods such as liquor, clothing, North Korean snacks, and dog treats. Panel discussions by defectors were held, as was an exhibition illustrating life in North Korea.

On July 14, 2025, President Lee Jae Myung vowed to increase support for North Korean defectors in the South. Celebrations were held across South Korea. A celebration was hosted by North Korean defector and actor Jeong Haneul at the Starfield COEX Mall in Seoul.

== See also ==
- North Korea–South Korea relations
- Public holidays in North Korea
- Public holidays in South Korea
