= Jo Song-gil =

North Korean diplomat and defector (1975-)

- 조성길

Acting Ambassador to Italy
- In office September 2017 – November 2018

Personal details
- Born: 1975 (age 50–51) North Korea
- Education: Pyongyang University of Foreign Studies

Jo Song-gil (Note: Also spelled Jo Song Gil, Jo Seong-gil, Jo Songgil, and Cho Sung-gil.) (Korean: 조성길; born 1975) is a former diplomat from North Korea who defected while serving as North Korea's acting ambassador to Italy.

== Acting ambassador ==
In September 2017, after the Italian government expelled Mun Jong-nam, then North Korea's ambassador to Italy, in response to North Korea's sixth nuclear test, Jo Song-gil became the acting ambassador to Italy. Jo had been a third-class secretary who was in charge of procuring luxury goods such as cars, yachts, building materials like marble, and expensive foods, for North Korea's elite since May 2015. In addition, Jo worked with the Food and Agriculture Organization of the United Nations (FAO) and the World Food Programme (WFP) in Rome, and there is speculation that he played a role in addressing food shortages in North Korea. Jo is fluent in Italian, French, and English. Jo Song-gil's wife is a graduate of Pyongyang Medical University.

== Defection ==
On November 10, 2018, former Ambassador Jo Song-gil and his wife disappeared in Rome, Italy, most likely having gone into hiding. He was due to leave his ambassadorship in late November. Reports claimed Jo was seeking asylum in a third country, most likely the United States. Jo's disappearance was not publicly known until early January 2019. Some soures claim this was the first time an ambassador-level North Korean had defected since Jang Seung-gil, ambassador to Egypt, and Hwang Jang-yop, chairman of the Supreme People's Assembly, both in 1997, but Jo was a working-level diplomat that was an acting ambassador.

Groups of North Korean defectors immediately called on Italy and South Korea to protect Jo and his family, including Tae Yong-ho, who was the deputy ambassador to the United Kingdom before he defected from North Korea in 2016. Tae personally knew the Jo family and said they were from a powerful and wealthy family in Pyongyang. Jo and Tae had attended the same foreign service school, the Pyongyang University of Foreign Studies. That Jo was allowed to take his children overseas reinforces the claim that he was from a very powerful family because North Korea typically requires such people to leave their children in North Korea in order to discourage defections. South Korea's newspaper JoongAng Daily reported that a North Korean expert said Jo was “known to be a son or son-in-law of one of the highest-level officials in the North’s regime.” Tae said that Jo's father and father-in-law were both ambassadors. Tae further claims that Jo's father-in-law is Lee Do-seop, North Korea's former ambassador to Thailand and Hong Kong. Tae encouraged Jo to come to South Korea.

Jo and his family were inititally under the protection of the Italian security services Agency for Foreign Intelligence and Security (AISE) and Internal Intelligence and Security Agency (AISI)." North Korea considers defections of high-level officials such as ambassadors highly embarrassing, as ambassadors have vital information about North Korea.

Jo's daughter was repatriated to North Korea. The North Korean government claimed it was at her request. Initially, some Italian government officials claimed she was taken by force in Rome soon after her the defection. CNN reported she repatriated on November 14, 2018 because she wanted to return to her grandparents. The BBC reported that the Italian foreign ministry stated she had returned to North Korea at her own request in February 2019.

Jo and his wife requested asylum and entered South Korea in July 2019, after traveling through Switzerland, France, and Eastern European countries. The South Korean government did not reveal his arrival there until early October 2020 in order to protect him and his wife and prevent a media frenzy.

In late 2024 Jo and his wife tried to visit Japan as tourists but the South Korean government banned them from leaving the country.

== See also ==
- North Korean Defectors' Day
