= Kim Seok =

Kim Seok may refer to:

- Kim Seok (singer)
- Kim Seok (equestrian)
