= Piotr Domaradzki =

Polish-American journalist (1946–2015)

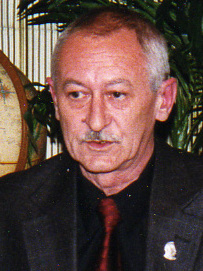
- Domaradzki in November 2006
- Born: Piotr Krystian Domaradzki; June 21, 1946; Strzelce Opolskie, Poland
- Died: November 4, 2015 (aged 69); Chicago, Illinois, U.S.
- Other name: Peter K. Domaradzki
- Education: University of Gdańsk
- Occupation: Journalist

Piotr Krystian Domaradzki (June 21, 1946 – November 4, 2015) was a Polish-American journalist, essayist and historian who, during a longtime association with Chicago's Polish community, worked for 30 years at Dziennik Związkowy (Alliance Daily), the oldest and largest Polish-language newspaper in the United States. From October 2009 to March 2013, he served as the paper's editor-in-chief. He emigrated from Poland in 1984 and became a U.S. citizen in 1996.

== Biography ==
=== Writer in Poland ===
Born in Strzelce Opolskie, a town and county seat in south-western Poland, Domaradzki received his high school diploma from II Liceum Ogólnokształcące im. dra Władysława Pniewskiego in Gdańsk. He graduated from University of Gdańsk with a major in late antiquity military history.

At the time martial law was declared in December 1981, Domaradzki was 35 years old and deeply involved as an activist and organizer in the Independent Self-governing Trade Union "Solidarity", with responsibility for frontline members as well as publications and press releases. Although martial law was lifted in July 1983, there was little immediate improvement in the country's political situation and, in January 1984, he left the Polish People's Republic for France. Ten months later he immigrated with his wife Janina and son Krystian (born 1979) to the U.S. where, in November 1985, they were granted political asylum. The Domaradzkis became parents of another child, daughter Sara, in 1991, six years after they settled in Chicago.

=== Newspaper editor in Chicago ===
Almost immediately upon arriving in Chicago, Domaradzki began working for Dziennik Związkowy. Before becoming editor-in-chief in 2009, he served as the newspaper's assistant editor from 1985 to 1987 and from 1998 to 2009. In 1996, along with another Chicago-based Polish exile, literary and film critic and academic Wojciech Wierzewski (1941–2008), he founded the discussion forum, Konwersatorium "Dialog 96" which, under the aegis of the Chicago chapter of the Polish Institute of Arts and Sciences of America (PIASA), focused primarily on activities within the cultural and intellectual communities in Poland and abroad.

== Death ==
On October 20, 2015, fire erupted at Domaradzki's home on Grace Street in the Portage Park community of Chicago. He was unconscious when rescued by firefighters and taken to Community First Medical Center and subsequently to a special unit of Loyola University Hospital where he died on November 4, without regaining consciousness, from the aftereffects of smoke inhalation. He was 69.

== Works ==
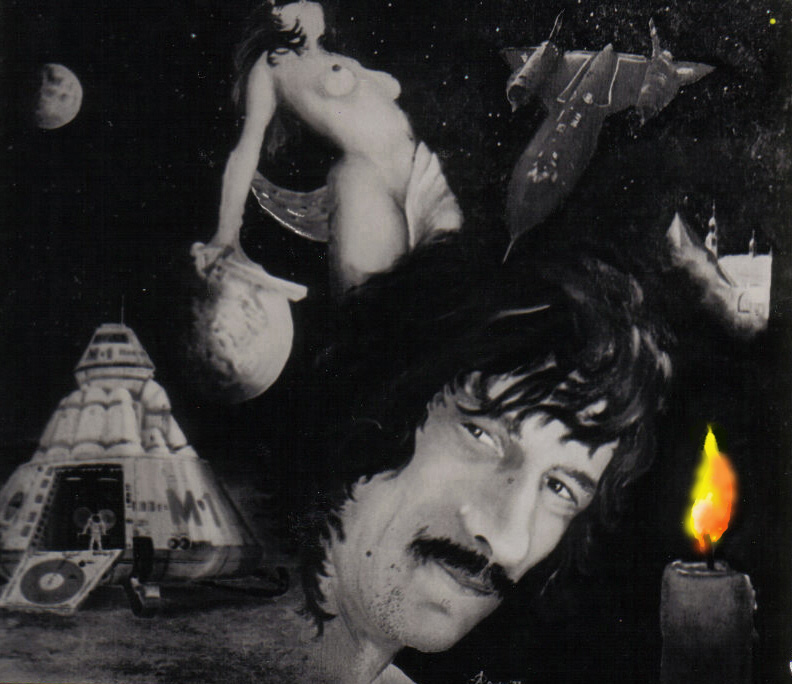
Piotr Domaradzki. Autoportret ze świecą [Self-Portrait with a Candle] (1974)

Domaradzki was a graphic artist, musician and painter, as well as author of numerous writings, including the novel Wiórki kokosowe [Coconut Shreds] published in Poland in 2003. He also translated into Polish Harvey Sarner's 1997 book General Anders and the Soldiers of the Second Polish Corps (published in Poland in 2006 as The Conquerors of Monte Cassino, General Anders and His Soldiers, with a Braille version in 2007). Among his historical treatises are Homo Armatus: History of Warfare in Antiquity (1979), The Defense of Lwów and Polish Corps in Russia 1917–1919 (both published by Solidarity Press in 1981) and General Anders and the Soldiers of the II Polish Corps (2002).

His numerous historical essays were a regular feature in Dziennik Związkowy's weekly culture and entertainment section, Kalejdoskop (Kaleidoscope).

== Wikipedia activity ==
Under the user name "Belissarius", Domaradzki was a prolific and multifaceted contributor on numerous topics in the Polish and English Wikipedia. On Polish Wikipedia, his first edit was on September 26, 2004, and his final two edits were made on the day of the fatal fire on October 20, 2015. On English Wikipedia, he was active in the Poland and Military history "WikiProjects", collaborative projects among Wikipedia editors. He frequently contributed to Wikimedia Commons, uploading photographs and drawings. He made over 110,000 edits to various Wikimedia projects, with most activity in Polish Wikipedia, where he made over 100,000 edits and created about 1,200 articles.
