= Thae Yong-ho =

South Korean politician and North Korean defector (born 1962)

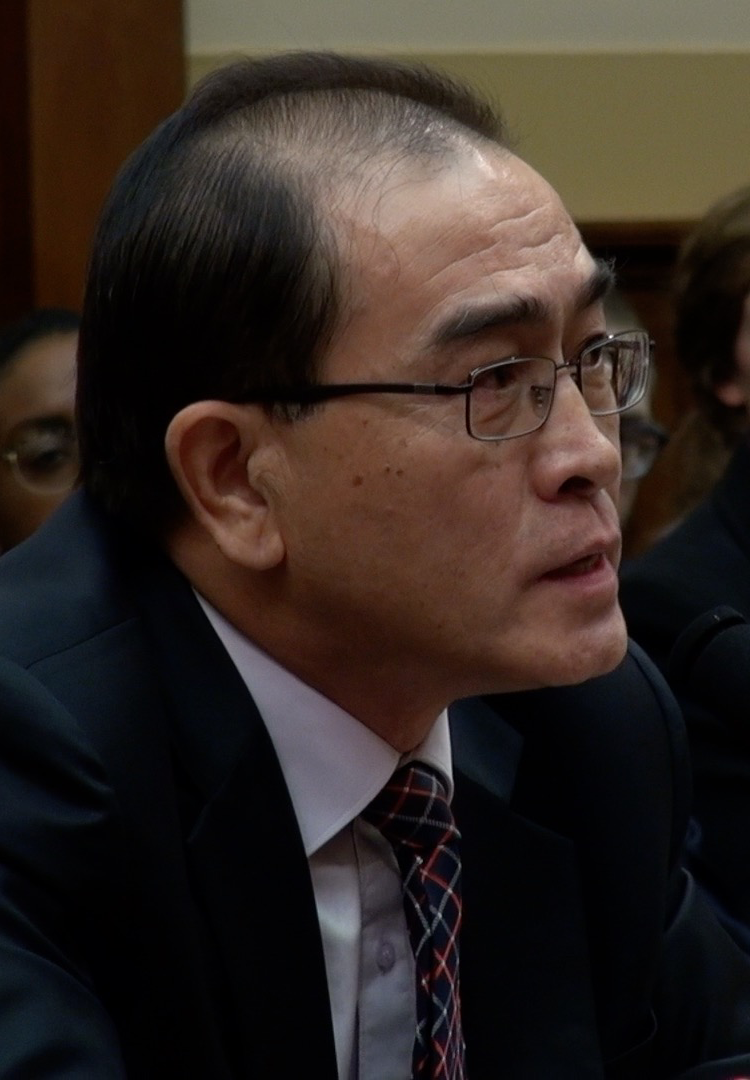
- Tae testifying at the U.S. Capitol in November 2017

Secretary General of the Peaceful Unification Advisory Council
- Incumbent
- Assumed office 22 July 2024

Member of the National Assembly
- In office 30 May 2020 – 23 May 2023
- Preceded by: Lee Jong-gu
- Succeeded by: Suh Myung-ok
- Constituency: Seoul, Gangnam A

North Korean Deputy Ambassador to the United Kingdom
- In office 1 June 2006 – 15 August 2016
- Supreme Leader: Kim Jong Il; Kim Jong Un

Personal details
- Born: 25 July 1962 (age 64) Pyongyang, North Korea
- Citizenship: South Korea; North Korea (until 2016)
- Party: Independent (since 2024)
- Other political affiliations: Workers' Party of Korea (before 2016); People Power Party (2020–2024)
- Spouse: O Hye-son
- Children: 2 sons
- Education: Beijing Foreign Studies University, Pyongyang University of Foreign Studies
- Known for: Defection
- Other names: Tae Ku-min

Korean name
- Hangul: 태영호
- Hanja: 太永浩
- RR: Tae Yeongho
- MR: T'ae Yŏngho

Pseudonym
- Hangul: 태구민
- Hanja: 太救民
- RR: Tae Gumin
- MR: T'ae Kumin

Thae Yong-ho (also spelled Tae Yong-ho; Korean: 태영호; pronounced [tʰɛ.jʌŋ.ɦo]; born 25 July 1962), also known by his pseudonym Tae Ku-min (태구민), is a North Korean-born South Korean politician and former diplomat who served as a member of the National Assembly for the Gangnam district of Seoul. After studying abroad in Beijing, China, for a decade, he became North Korea's deputy ambassador to the United Kingdom, prior to defecting with his family to South Korea in 2016. In August 2016, the South Korean government confirmed that Thae and his family were under their protection.

Thae was elected to the National Assembly in the 2020 South Korean legislative election as a member of the People Power Party.

== Early life and education ==
Thae was born in North Korea. He studied abroad in Beijing, China, at a young age, and learned English for more than eight years. For his undergraduate degree, he studied at Beijing Foreign Studies University (BFSU) after graduating from its affiliated high school. He then returned to North Korea and went on to study at the Pyongyang University of Foreign Studies. Thae began working in the 1980s.

== Defection and aftermath ==
He was North Korea's deputy ambassador to the United Kingdom until August 2016, defecting with his family to South Korea. Thae was one of North Korea's elite, regarded by observers as a sophisticated diplomat who was one of the "best and brightest" in the country. Following his defection, the North Korean government denounced him as "human scum", accused him without evidence of crimes including embezzlement and child rape, and unsuccessfully petitioned Britain to extradite him to North Korea for trial.

Since his defection, Thae has given many talks and interviews about North Korea's government, which he describes as violent and controlling. Citing the killings of Kim Jong-nam and Jang Song-thaek, Thae believes that he is likely a target for assassination by Kim Jong Un due to his defection and outspokenness. In an interview in January 2017, Thae stated that the United Nations sanctions on North Korea were hurting the Kim regime, and that it is under significant pressure. In another interview the same month, Thae said, "I am very determined to do everything possible to pull down the regime to save not only my family members but also the whole North Korean people from slavery." Thae believes that "Kim Jong-un's regime one day will collapse by a people's uprising." In an interview in April 2017, Thae stated that Kim was "desperate in maintaining his rule" and was relying heavily on its development of nuclear weapons and ballistic missiles to deter an external attack and preserve his grip on power.

Thae worked as an adviser at the Institute for National Security Strategy from early 2017, an organization affiliated with the National Intelligence Service; he resigned from the job out of personal will in May 2018. He makes videos for the website Daily NK.

Thae testified before the US House Foreign Relations Committee in November 2017. Thae advised the use of soft power, such as disseminating outside information, to weaken Kim Jong Un's rule. He stated that the North Korean regime wants nuclear weapons in order to intimidate the U.S. into withdrawing its military forces from South Korea, thus weakening South Korea. He also equated the North Korean regime to that of apartheid-era South Africa and Nazi Germany.

In May 2018, Thae published Passcode to the Third Floor (3층 서기실의 암호; 3層 書記室의 暗號), a memoir detailing his life as a high-ranking North Korean diplomat. Thae wrote the book at the strong urging of Ahn Byung-hoon, the founder of Guiparang Publishing, who believed that Thae’s experiences must be documented as a historical record. The publication process reportedly faced significant opposition and delays from the National Intelligence Service (NIS) under the Moon Jae-in administration, which was cautious about the disclosure of sensitive information during a period of inter-Korean diplomacy. Despite these hurdles, Ahn's persistence led to the successful release of the memoir, which became a massive bestseller in South Korea, selling over 140,000 copies within its first two months. The memoir was described by Andrei Lankov as "a remarkably balanced and unbiased text" and it "writes about the North Korean system in a slightly detached way, describing how things are done but never going into a righteous frenzy of moralistic outrage". However, Fyodor Tertitskiy's review in Pacific Affairs said that the book suffers from translation flaws, a selectively self-aggrandising narrative, and limited accessibility for general readers, despite offering valuable insights into North Korean diplomacy and internal politics. In 2019, Thae encouraged another defector Jo Song-gil to come to South Korea after he defected in Italy.

== Political career ==
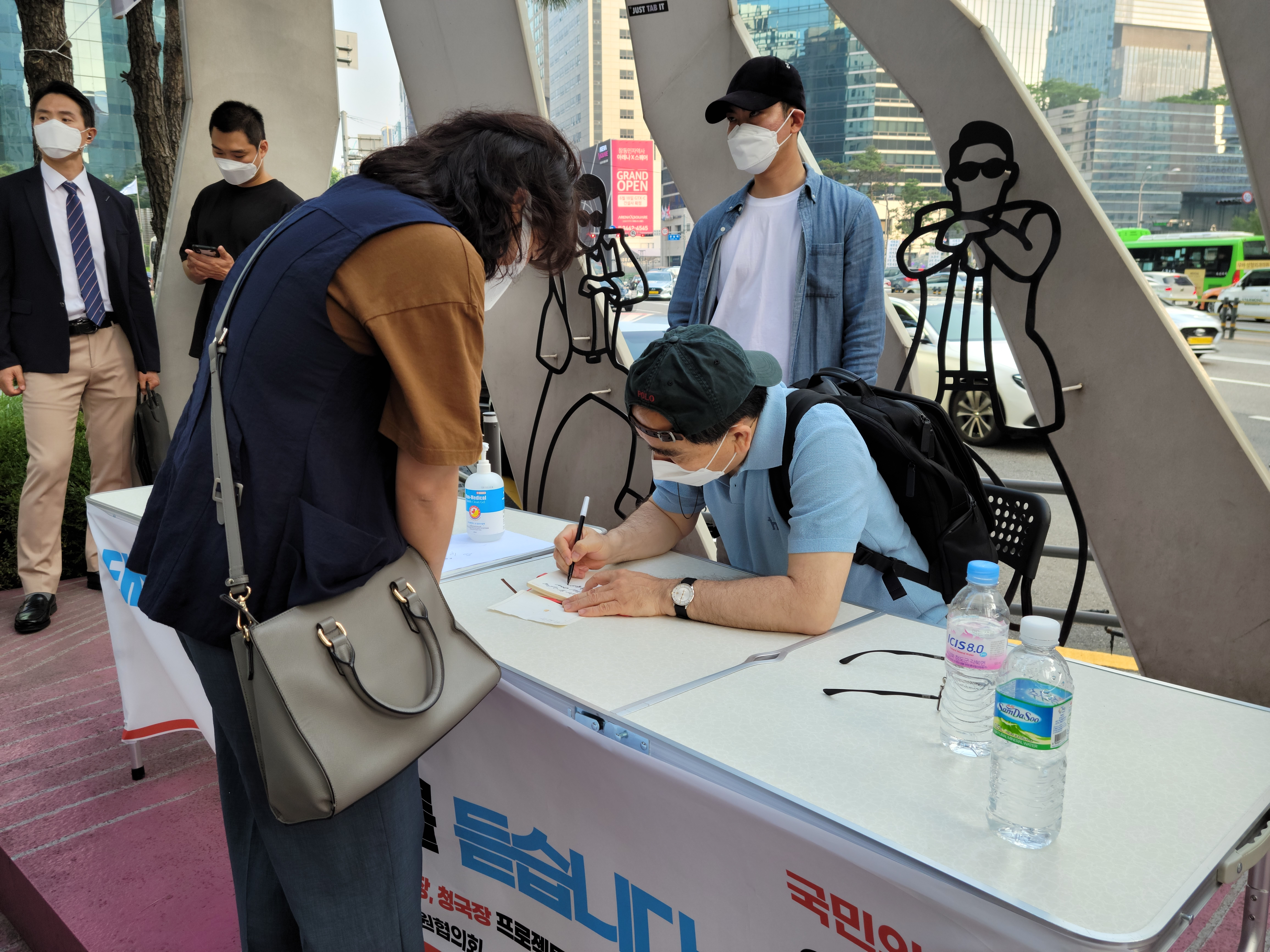
Thae signing autographs at Gangnam station at a commemorative event

In February 2020, Thae ran for a seat representing the Gangnam District of Seoul in the National Assembly in South Korea's parliamentary elections in April 2020. During his campaign, Thae ran under the pseudonym Thae Ku-min (태구민), Ku-min meaning "saving the people [of North Korea]". Despite initially facing skepticism regarding his campaign and having no connection to the Gangnam District, Thae easily beat his opponent, becoming the first North Korean defector to win a National Assembly seat through a constituency vote.

In May 2020, Thae apologised for claiming Kim Jong Un was probably so ill, he could not stand during a three week period, when Kim was not seen in public. The Democratic Party criticised Thae for carelessness, with some members urging that Thae should be excluded from the intelligence and defence committees.

On 10 May 2023, he voluntarily resigned from the People's Power Supreme Council.

On 18 July 2024, President Yoon nominated Thae as the secretary-general of the Peaceful Unification Advisory Council.

== Personal life ==
Thae is married to Oh Hye-son (오혜선), a relative of Kim Il Sung's comrade in arms during the 1930s, O Paek-ryong. They have two sons. Their older son is a graduate of a British university, and their younger son, who was born in Denmark, when Thae was serving as a diplomat there, was studying at a London school. The younger son had been offered a place to study computer science at Imperial College London. However, the family had been recalled to Pyongyang just before Thae's defection. Thae was able to escape with his wife and children, but his brother and sister were left behind in North Korea. Thae stated after his defection that "I'm sure that my relatives and my brothers and sisters are either sent to remote, closed areas or to prison camps, and that really breaks my heart."

According to BBC reports, Thae is convivial, and enjoys Indian food, playing golf and tennis. In addition to Korean and English, he speaks fluent Mandarin. In 2015, he escorted Kim Jong-chul, the older brother of North Korean Supreme Leader Kim Jong Un, to an Eric Clapton concert in London. During his time in London, he lived in a two-bedroom flat in West London. Thae stated that he defected as he did not want his children, who were used to a life of freedom in Britain, to live a life of oppression in North Korea.

== Works ==
- Tae Yong-ho (2018). 3층 서기실의 암호 [Cryptography From the Third-Floor Secretariat] (in Korean). Seoul: Guiparang. ISBN 978-8-96523-650-4.
- Tae Yong-ho (2020). 태영호의 서울생활 [Tae Yong-ho's Life in Seoul] (in Korean). Seoul: Guiparang. ISBN 9788965236061.

== See also ==
- Embassy of North Korea, London
- List of North Korean defectors in South Korea
- North Koreans in South Korea
- South Korean defectors
- Hwang Jang-yop, highest-ranking North Korean defector
