= Oh Chong-song =

North Korean defector (born 1992/1993)

- Born: 1992 or 1993 (age 32–33); Near Kaesong, Changpung County, North Hwanghae Province, North Korea
- Citizenship: South Korea
- Occupation: Soldier
- Known for: Escape from North Korea

Korean name
- Hangul: 오청성
- Hanja: 吳青成
- RR: O Cheongseong
- MR: O Ch'ŏngsŏng

Oh Chong-song (Korean: 오청성; born 1992 or 1993), also spelled Oh Chung-sung, is a North Korean defector. Oh is one of several defectors who have defected to South Korea via the Joint Security Area (JSA). Prior to his defection, Oh was an industrial engineer. South Korean investigators concluded Oh "impulsively" defected.

According to Sankei Shimbun, Japanese officials have confirmed that Oh is the son of a North Korean major general.

== Defection ==
Oh defected from North Korea on November 13, 2017. During his escape, he drove a car directly up to the Military Demarcation Line (MDL) dividing North and South Korea and crashed, apparently losing a wheel. He then exited the car and sprinted across the MDL under close-range gunfire, collapsing on the South Korean side under cover of a low wall, metres away from the MDL. After being rescued by South Korean soldiers, Oh was transported in a helicopter from the U.S. Eighth Army's 2nd Combat Aviation Brigade, to the Ajou University Hospital in Suwon. Having lost half of his blood from five gunshot wounds received from North Korean soldiers during his escape, his condition required immediate surgery upon arrival at the hospital to save his life. In an interview with Japan's Sankei Shimbun in 2018, Oh said his defection was accidental and impulsive, which occurred following an incident that led to the death of someone. He added that he was drunk when he inadvertently passed a North Korean checkpoint and decided to cross the border out of fear of being punished.

== Reaction ==
North Korean soldiers violated the Korean Armistice Agreement during the incident by firing shots across the MDL into South Korea. Following these events, North Korean guards in the Joint Security Area were replaced. Additional measures were taken to prevent similar defections. A trench was dug at the site where Oh's vehicle had broken down and a new gate was installed along the road to Panmunjom.

== Health ==
While Oh was in surgery for his gunshot wounds, doctors found large parasitic worms in his digestive tract, one of which was 27 centimetres (11 in) long. The parasites were Ascaris lumbricoides worms. Oh was treated by surgeon Lee Guk-jong at the Ajou University Hospital's intensive care. Oh was later transferred to a military hospital. The surgery and treatment of Oh cost the South Korean government 65 million won ($60,800). South Korea's Channel A reported that an unnamed South Korean intelligence agent claimed that one of the four North Korean soldiers who defected in 2017 had anthrax antibodies in his system; however, the South Korean defense ministry did not confirm the report, and stated that none of the four soldiers are believed to have worked in North Korea's biochemical warfare unit. A South Korean intelligence official familiar with Oh's case reported to MBN that Oh may be showing signs of post-traumatic stress disorder. Oh could not recall his defection during interrogation.

== Alleged confession ==
According to an unnamed source quoted by the South Korean newspaper The Dong-a Ilbo, Oh allegedly confessed to South Korean investigators that he had committed a crime in North Korea, which "caused a death" or "led to the killing of people", depending on the source.

Oh later denied the reports in an interview with the Japanese newspaper Sankei Shimbun, characterizing his defection as accidental. According to Oh, he was drinking after having trouble with friends and accidentally drove through a checkpoint while trying to return to his post. Fearing he would be executed if apprehended, Oh crossed the border. He has nonetheless said he does not regret defecting.

== In the media ==
CNN has made a special documentary on the defection of Oh. In 2019, NBC did a short update interview with Oh. In January 2020, Oh was arrested by Geumcheon District police in Seoul for drunk driving.

== See also ==
- Conrad Schumann, East German policeman who defected to West Germany in 1961
- Korean People's Army
- List of North Korean defectors in South Korea
- Schießbefehl, East German rules of engagement for defectors attempting to flee
