= Cheongyang County =

Coordinates: 36°27′04″N 126°48′16″E

Cheongyang
- County
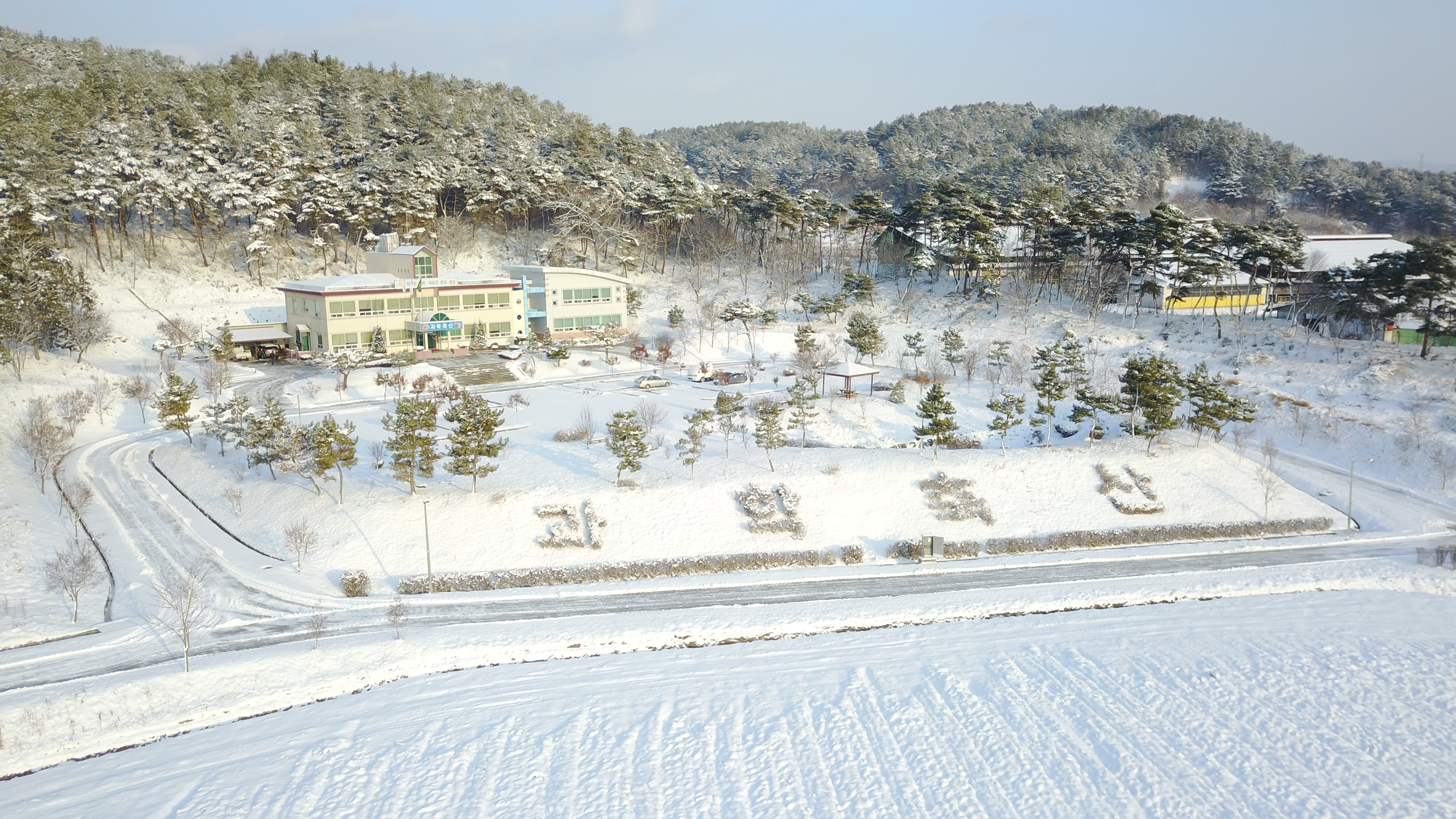
- Chungnam Livestock Research Institute

- Flag Emblem of Cheongyang

- Location in South Korea
- Country: South Korea
- Region: Hoseo
- Administrative divisions: 1 eup, 9 myeon

Area
  - Total: 479.57 km^{2} (185.16 sq mi)

Population (September 2024)
  - Total: 29,687
  - Density: 77.6/km^{2} (201/sq mi)
  - Dialect: Chungcheong

Korean name
- Hangul: 청양군
- Hanja: 靑陽郡
- RR: Cheongyang-gun
- MR: Ch'ŏngyang-gun

Cheongyang County (Korean: 청양군) is a county in South Chungcheong Province, South Korea. A predominantly rural area, it is known throughout Korea for the spicy peppers which are grown there. (Note: Cheongyang chili peppers, however, are not grown in Cheongyang County. Their name originates from the combination of Cheongsong and Yeongyang Counties, were they are grown; these counties are located in the west of Korea, far from the eastern Cheongyang County.) Another noted local specialty is the fruit of the gugija. The county is home to Cheongyang Provincial College.

== Notable people ==
- Kim Hye-soo – actress
- Hong Seok-cheon – host, actor
- Lee Chun-hee – actor
- Song Yo-chan - Lieutenant General, politician, and former acting Prime Minister of South Korea.

== Twin towns – sister cities ==
Cheongyang is twinned with:

- Yeongdeungpo-gu, Seoul
- Seocho-gu, Seoul
- Gangdong-gu, Seoul
- Mapo-gu, Seoul
- Geumcheon-gu, Seoul
- Ansan, Gyeonggi
- Gunpo, Gyeonggi
- Dong-gu, Daejeon
