= Mu Chong =

North Korean general (1904–1952)

Kim Mu Chong Colonel general
- 무정
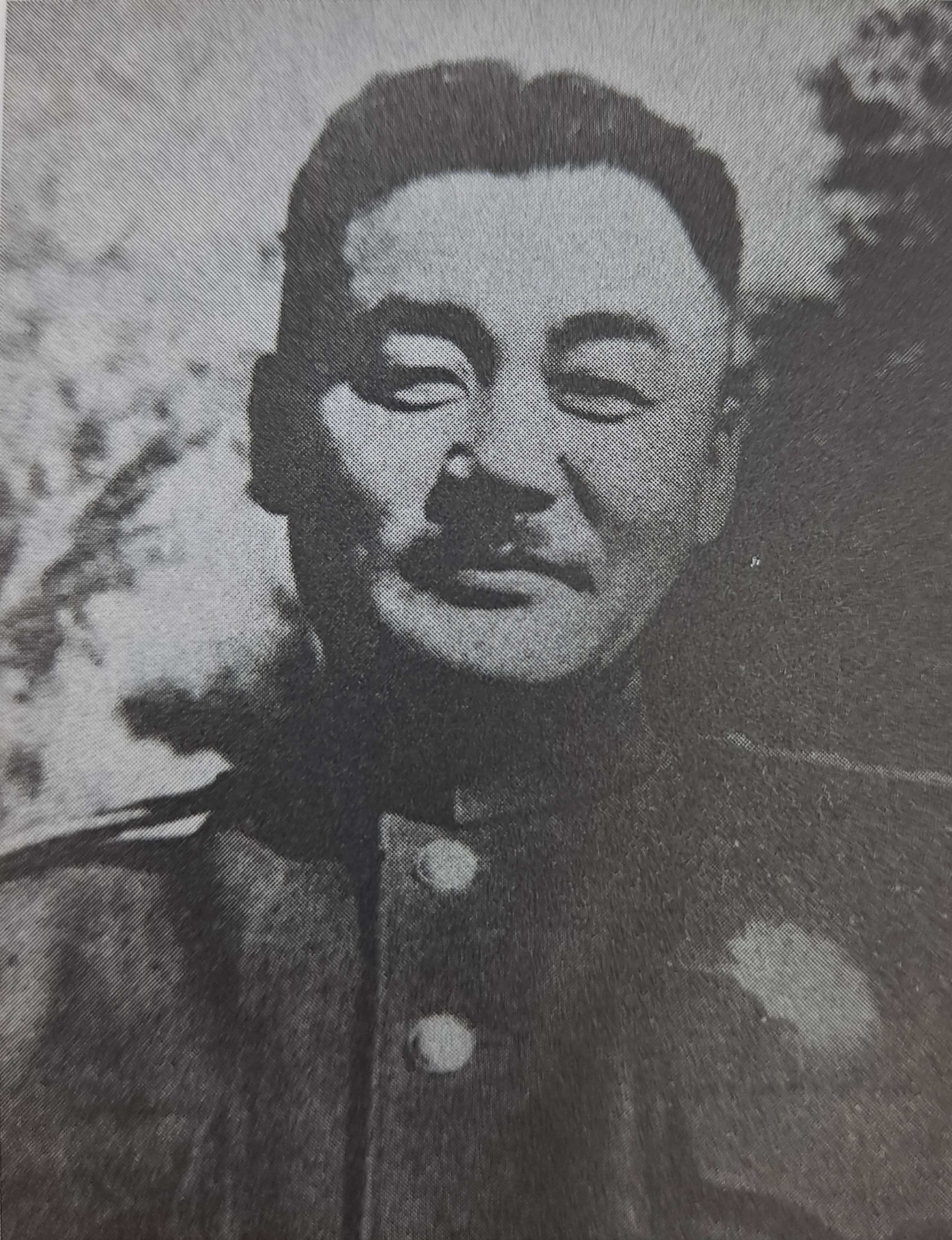
- Born: 1904; Chongjin, North Hamgyeong Province, Empire of Korea
- Died: 1951 (aged 46–47); Beijing, People's Republic of China
- Burial place: Patriotic Martyrs' Cemetery
- Military career
- Allegiance: North Korea
- Branch: Korean People's Army
- Service years: 1945–1952
- Rank: Colonel general
- Commands: 2nd corps
- Conflicts: See battles Korean independence movement: Pacification of Manchukuo; Chinese Civil War World War II: Pacific War; Korean War: Battle of Mugeuk-ri; Battle of Dongnak-ri; Battle of Jincheon; Battle of Danyang; Battle of Ihwaryeong-Mungyeong; Battle of Yeongdeok-Ganggu; Battle of the Punchbowl; Battle of Pusan Perimeter; Battle of Cheonpyeong Valley; Battle of Kyongju; UN offensive into North Korea; Battle of Yeongcheon; Changsha landing operation; Battle of Chosan; Hungnam evacuation; Battle of Hyeonri; UN September 1950 counteroffensive

Korean name
- Hangul: 김무정
- RR: Gim Mujeong
- MR: Kim Mujŏng

Mu Chong (Korean: 무정, 1904–1952), born Kim Mu-chong (김무정), was a Korean communist, independence activist, general and statesman of North Korea. He had been living in China for years when he joined the Chinese Communist Party fighting against the Japanese. After the liberation of Korea, he returned to North Korea and became a general in the Korean People's Army. He was an important member of the Yan'an faction, a group of pro-China communists in the North Korean government.

== Biography ==
He was born in 1904 in Chongjin, North Hamgyeong Province as the son of Kim Ki-Jun.

=== Liberation of Korea and return ===
After the liberation of Korea on August 15, the Communist Korean Army came to North Korea separately while participating in the Civil War in China. When he returned to North Korea, Kim Il Sung was uncomfortable with his reputation and unwillingness to submit to him, and he was always anxious and vigilant and saw him as a strong static from the beginning. Mu Chong gave a look at the convenience of returning to North Korea from the members of the Korean People's Army Medical Corps and the Korean Independent Alliance. In October 1945, Mujung, who did not recognize both the CCP reconstruction and the Jangan sect in the Ministry of Economy and Trade, organized a separate committee to promote the reconstruction of the CCP in Pyongyang. In November 1945, he went directly to Pyongyang Station to support the settlement of North Korean soldiers who returned home. After that, he became the second secretary of the Workers' Party.

From the end of December 1945, Kim Goo rebelled against the Moscow three-phase talks and pursued a strong opposition movement, becoming a member of the National General Mobilization Committee against Trusteeship and Reform formed on December 30. However, when the Workers' Party returned to Chantak, Mu Chong also turned to Chantak.

=== Participate in the creation of the People's Army ===
In 1946, he was selected as one of the Deputy Commanders of the Artillery Deputy Commander of the Security Officer Training Corps during his stay in Pyongyang in February of that year. While working in China, he was classified as a pro-Chinese, but he had trouble with China on the issue of Gando. He became the 2nd secretary of the Workers' Party of Korea, but in 1946 Kim Il Sung demoted him to the artillery commander of the security officer training battalion.

On May 10, 1947, in the presence of Choi Yong-geon and other People's Liberation Army officers, Kim Mu Chong insisted, “In return for fighting the blood of Korean soldiers in the Manchurian War, Joseon must obtain Jiandao”. Data published by the Unification Ministry of the Republic of Korea stated that since 1948, there has been a difference of opinion between North Korea and China due to the problem of taking over Paektu Mountain.

After the founding of the Korean People's Army in February 1948, he was appointed commander of the 2nd Command Center of the People's Army and became a national security officer after the formal establishment of the Democratic People's Republic of Korea. He participated in the 1st inter-Korean negotiations in April 1948, and the 2nd inter-Korean negotiations held in Haeju in August. On September 2, the first Supreme People's Assembly was elected.

=== Korean War ===
When the Korean War broke out on June 25, 1950, he participated in the Korean War as a national security guard, as a commander of the Artillery Commander of the Korean People's Army and as a commander of the Second Army of the KPA. During the Korean War, General Kim Kwang-hyop failed to defeat the Korean army properly, and after that, he became a resignation officer, and as a successor, he served as the 2nd Army Commander. However, he violated the order to defend Pyongyang, and immediately executed a retreat for the retreaters on the Nakdong River Front, deteriorating the atmosphere inside the army, being dismissed from the position, resigned from the military, and soon reinstated.

=== Downfall ===
In November 1950, he was defeated by the U.S. Army and retreated from the Nakdong River. However, while patrolling Manpo in Jagang Province, he encountered an injured soldier from Palo County who was close to Mu Chong. Immediately, Mu Chong immediately took the soldier from Palo County to the field hospital and asked for medical treatment from Li Chong-san of the Pyongbuk Provincial People's Committee's Sanitation Division. However, Li Chong-san was busy and refused. Mu Chong threatened him and Li Chong-san was killed on the spot. The incident in the Pyongbuk Field Military Hospital was a problem, and Mu Chong was immediately removed from office, and at the special meeting of the Central Committee of the Workers' Party of Korea held at Byeol-ri, Manpo-gun on December 4, 1950, before the 3rd power meeting was held. He was purged after being referred to the People's Army's military trial for charges of disobedience to orders, disloyalty of the fighting organization, and illegal murder in the retreat.

In 1951, the gastrointestinal disease he suffered worsened and he went to Beijing, China, with the help of Peng Dehuai, and was admitted to the People's Army Hospital of China. In October of that year, he died at the 39th Army Hospital of the Korean People's Army. The cause of death was gastrointestinal disease, and same are said to have been purged. His remains were buried in the Patriotic Martyrs' Cemetery in Pyongyang.
