= Lee Guk-jong =

South Korean Trauma Surgeon

- 이국종
- Born: 22 April 1969 (age 57); Gangseo-gu, South Korea
- Education: Ajou University
- Occupations: Trauma surgeon; Honorary Naval Captain
- Years active: 1969–present
- Title: Professor of Emergency Medicine at Ajou University Medical School; Professor of Trauma Surgery of Ajou University Medical School; Ajou University Medical Center Director of Trauma Research Institute
- Children: 2

Lee Guk-jong (Korean: 이국종), also romanized as Lee Cook-jong is a South Korean doctor. As a surgeon specializing in trauma, post-traumatic stress disorder and gunshot wounds, he has been described as "Korea's most prestigious trauma doctor" by Defence Minister Shin Won-sik. He won "The Person Who Brightened the World" award in November 2017. Lee Guk-jong leads the trauma surgery team at Ajou University Hospital.

== Personal life ==
Lee Guk-jong was born in Gangseo District, Seoul in 1969. His father was a disabled Korean War veteran. As a child, Guk-jong's family was so poor that they had to subsist on government food rations.

Lee Guk-jong went to the hospital with a medical welfare card given to children of veterans, but often got rejected for being unprofitable. He had to walk a long way because there were no big hospitals near his home. He decided that he would treat people better when he grew up.

However, one hospital, Kim Hak-san Surgery, treated Lee Guk-jong the same as a regular patient. The doctor of the hospital refused to charge Guk-jong and would often give him pocket money.

== Career ==
- Graduated from Ajou University College of Medicine
- Doctor of Medicine degree from Ajou University Graduate School of Medicine.
- Surgical Research Instructor of Ajou University Medical College
- Training at the University of California, San Diego, USA
- Full-time lecturer in the emergency medical class at Ajou University Medical College
- Training at The Royal London Hospital Trauma Center, UK
- A director of the Regional Trauma Center at Ajou University Hospital
- Head of Ajou University Medical Center's Trauma Research Institute
- Professor of Surgery and Emergency Medical Classes at Ajou University Medical School

== Treatment of Captain Seok Hae-gyun during Operation Dawn of Gulf of Aden ==
In January 2011, the Samho Jewelry of Korea's Samho Shipping Co. was hijacked by Somali pirates. Republic of Korea UDT/SEALs were sent to retake the boat and wipe out the pirates. During the operation, Captain Seok Hae-gyun was seriously wounded by six AK gunshots to his abdomen and limbs. He underwent surgery at Oman University Hospital, but soon fell into critical condition. After news got back to Korea, professor Guk-jong was immediately dispatched to Oman. After checking Hae-gyun's condition, he made the judgement that Hae-gyun would die if left in Oman and insisted on escorting Captain Seok back to Korea using an air ambulance.

However, the air ambulance intended to be used for the evacuation cost about US $380,000 to rent. As the Korean government stalled in providing payment, Guk-jong stated that he would pay for the rent, and that they needed to transfer him immediately. The situation was settled with the Ministry of Foreign Affairs eventually agreeing to pay for the expenses. After transferring Captain Seok to South Korea, Lee Guk-jong successfully conducted surgery on him. After the recovery of Captain Seok, both Seok and Guk-jong received medals for the incident, bringing Guk-jong and Ajou University Hospital national recognition.

== 2017 North Korean soldier shooting in Panmunjom ==
On November 13, 2017, Oh Chong-song, a North Korean soldier, crossed the Military Demarcation Line and attempted to defect to South Korea at one of the North Korean guard posts in the Joint Security Area of Panmunjom. He was shot five times by other North Korean soldiers pursuing him. The soldier who defected to South Korea was seriously wounded and was rushed to Ajou University Hospital in a state of unconsciousness. Lee Guk-jong was in charge of emergency surgery for the soldier, and after several operations, the soldier regained consciousness.

In a press briefing, Professor Lee Guk-jong stated, "A large number of parasites, which are rare in the South Korean people's bodies, have been found in the bodies of soldiers of North Korea, and are having difficulty treating them as parasites have invaded at the wound." Hong Sung-tae, a professor at the Seoul National University School of Medicine, stated, "There are a lot of roundworms in North Korea. A North Korean soldier is said to have hurt his small intestine, which is where the roundworms live in.

On November 21, Kim Jong-dae, a member of Congress, posted, "The North Korean soldier who defected to the South was terrorized by the disclosure of parasites" on Facebook, causing a controversy. He pointed out, "Through this soldier, North Korea has become a parasite country, a dirty country, and an abhorrent country." He criticized South Korea, saying, "I think South Korea, a country of voyeurism that exposes it, is no better than North Korea." As criticism and protest flooded Kim Jong-dae's Facebook page over this controversy, He expressed regret over putting pressure on Lee Guk-jong.

== Work-related injury ==
Professor Guk-jong works 120 hours a week. He has worked 36 hours in a row consistently for 15 years in trauma surgery while occasionally taking short naps. As a result, his right shoulder broke while going to the scene of the Sewol Ferry disaster and his left knee broke after he jumped out of a helicopter. His left eye became almost blind after capillaries in his eyes ruptured while he was treating Captain Seok Hae-kyun. People around him tried to stop him, but he said he would rest after completing treatment. Even when surgery was over, he operated again and again when the patient came, and eventually almost went blind. He discovered this issue in a medical checkup in 2015.

== Reception ==
Most of Korea's trauma surgeons, including Professor Lee Guk-jong and Ajou University Hospital's trauma clinics, are in red and are maintained by government subsidies and sales from other departments. Professor Lee Guk-jong expressed his feelings about the poor medical system in Korea. While participating in Ulchi-Freedom Guardian military exercise, he realized that Ajou University did not have a helicopter landing site. To solve this issue, he wrote a big 'H' on the street between the medical school and the hospital building and used it as a helipad. He said that rather than complimenting him, people treated him as a "crazy guy".
