= Chungnam Provincial College =

Technical college in Cheongyang, South Korea

- 충남도립대학교
- Type: Public College
- Location: South Korea; 36.43699°N 126.80064°E
- Website: www.cheongyang.ac.kr (in Korean)

Chungnam Provincial College (Korean: 충남도립대학교) is the only institution of higher education located in rural Cheongyang County, in South Chungcheong province, South Korea. It is a public technical college, offering instruction in a range of vocational fields. It employs around 23 full-time instructors.

== Academics ==
Academic offerings are divided among departments of Civil Engineering, Visual Information Design, Fire Safety Engineering, Display Electronic Engineering, Computer Information, Environmental Health Science, Beauty Coordination, Local Autonomy Administration, Land Administration, and Tourism.

== History ==
The school opened its doors in 1998, planning for such an institution having begun in 1994.

== See also ==
- List of national universities in South Korea
- List of universities and colleges in South Korea
- Education in Korea
