= Ryu Tongnyŏl =

Korean independence activist (1879–1950)

- 류동열
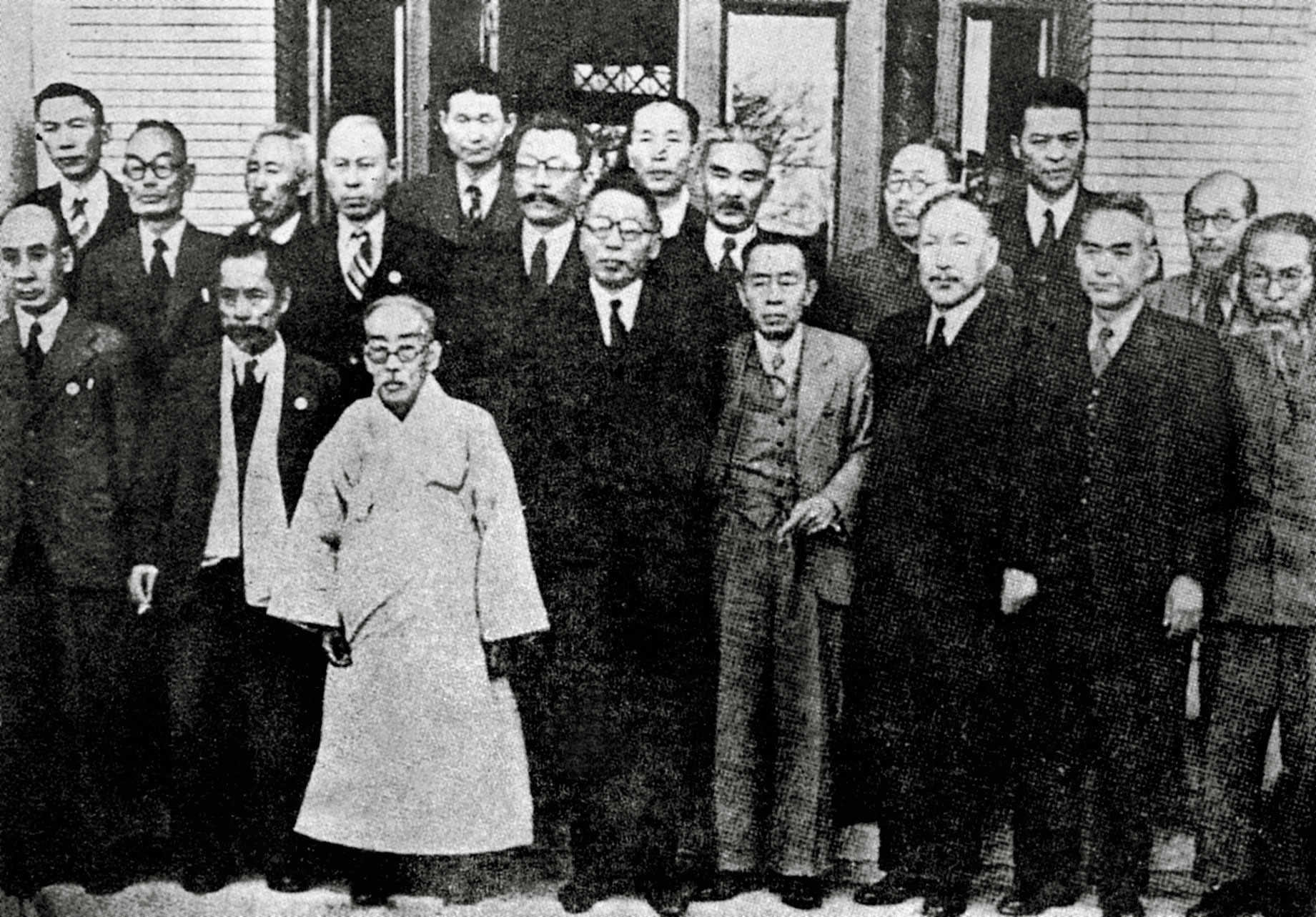
- A photo commemorating the return of the Provisional Government of Korea on December 3, 1945. Third from the right on the second row.

President of the Provisional Government of the Republic of Korea

Personal details
- Born: March 26, 1879 Pakchon County, North Pyongan Province, Joseon
- Died: October 18, 1950 (aged 71)
- Party: Korea Independence Party

Ryu Tongnyŏl (Korean: 류동열; Hanja: 柳東說, March 26, 1879 – October 18, 1950) was a Korean independence activist, a member of the Provisional Government of the Republic of Korea, a guerrilla fighter in Manchuria, and a member of the Korean Liberation Army. He served briefly as the head of the Provisional Government in 1939, and, after the 1945 liberation of Korea, he served as the head of the U.S. occupational government's Unification Committee at the recommendation of Chough Pyung-ok and Lee Eung-jun.

He was the first commander of a Korean unit after liberation, putting him at odds with the US military government and their claim that the appointment of a high-ranking officer should only be done by people from the yangban class, the traditional ruling class of dynastic Korea.

== Biography ==
Ryu Tongnyŏl was born on March 26, 1879, at 199 Maehwa-ri, Pakchon County, North Pyongan Province, Joseon, to Ryu Jong-sik, his father, and a mother with the surname Ch'oe. When he was 19 years old he moved to the United States with his cousin and stayed in San Francisco for some time before going to Japan to enter a preparatory school for the Japanese Military Academy, from which he graduated in 1903. After graduating he worked as an apprentice officer in the Japanese military, returning to Korea after serving as an assistant inspector at the Japanese Imperial Guard Division.

Ryu Tongnyŏl then formed a secret association called Hyochunghoe, with No Baek-rin and Yi Dong-hwi, as an officer in the Korean Empire army, and planned the assassination of a minister of a pro-Japanese group. In 1904, he fought the Russo-Japanese War as an officer in charge of dispatching Korean Empire troops engaged in Japanese military service against Russian troops near Suncheon, South Pyongan province. After the end of the Russo-Japanese War, he was dispatched to the Japanese Sixth Army in Gyeongseong, and then returned to the Korean Empire Army.

After the war, he was appointed as an instructor for the Korean Empire Army Military Academy and a youth school. He transferred to the military service bureau in 1905 (Gwangmu 8). He was promoted to chamryeong (參領, colonel) and was appointed as the second manager of the Royal Protesters' Cavalry Division and Chief of Staff Bureau. In 1906 (Gwangmu 9) he met Ahn Chang-ho, who had returned from the United States, and participated as one of the founding fathers of Sinminhoe in April 1907. In August 1907, the Korean Empire army joined the anti-Japanese independence movement when the order of compulsory dissolution was issued. After the announcement of the military dissolution decree, he went to West Gando, Manchuria, and planned to establish a military academy, but failed and returned home, where he interacted with Ahn Chang-ho, Yoon Chi-ho, and Lee Sang-jae.

Even after leaving the army as a colonel in August 1909, he was involved in the Seou Association, the Shinminhoe, and the Northwest Association, as well as in the National Debt Repayment Movement. After serving as the cavalry leader of the former Korean army, he actively participated in the Patriotic Enlightenment Movement and published an article against Japanese imperialism in 1909. On October 26 of that year, when Ahn Jung-geun killed Hirobumi Ito, he was designated as one of the people behind the plot and was arrested. As Japan became more oppressive due to these activities, he fled to China Beijing.

=== The movement for asylum and independence ===
After exile, Ryu Tongnyŏl worked in Beijing and various places in Korea to raise funds for the independence forces. During his exile, he used the names Yoo Dong-seol and Yoo Cheong-song as pseudonyms in addition to his real name.

In July of that year, he attended the Qingdao Conference in Qingdao, China, where Ahn Chang-ho participated as vice chairman of the New People's Association, and strongly insisted on gathering comrades and forcefully resisting the Japanese Government-General and Japan. Ryu Tongnyŏl was arrested by Japanese consulate police and repatriated to Joseon. In August 1911, he was sentenced to 10 years in prison, the maximum sentence, in his first trial, along with Yun Chi-ho, Yang Ki-tak, and Lee Seung-hoon, for their involvement in the 105-Man Incident. On March 13, 1920, he was found not guilty due to no serious charges being brought, but was sentenced to one and a half years in prison. After being released in 1913, he fled to Manchuria. He then mainly participated in independence movements in Jilin Province.

In 1913, Russia's Primorsky Krai declared the revival of the New People's Association with Lee Dong-hwi, Lee Gap, and Lee Kang, and re-organized the New People's Association by electing heads from each region of Russia. He also joined Gwoneophoe with Lee Sang-seol and Lee Dong-hwi.

In 1917 in the Russian Far East, Ryu Tongnyŏl participated in the formation of the Jeonro Han Chinese 族 Association with Kim Lip, Moon Chang-beom, and others in Ssangseong (雙). He joined the Junggwangdan 團 of Seo Il (徐) in 1918, and participated in the signing as one of the 39 members of the Declaration of Independence for Jilin by independence activists in Manchuria, along with Kim Chwa-chin and Kim Dong-sam in February 1919. Afterwards, he founded the Shinhan Revolutionary Party, Korean Socialist Party, and Korean Communist Party, established the Goryeo Military Government Council, and was elected as a member of the military government.

In March 1918, he attended the Korean People's Revolutionary Party Congress held in Khabarovsk under the supervision of Krasnochekov, chairman of the Dongwon People's Committee, along with Lee Dong-hwi, Kim Lip, Yi Tongnyŏng, and Yang Kit'ak, and soon founded and promoted The Korean Socialist Party. In May 1918, he was appointed the military director of the Korean Socialist Party and the head of the military school.

When the Japanese military was dispatched to Siberia, he participated in the Korean American Red Guards organized by the Korean Socialist Party in July 1918, and participated in the Battle of Iman as the commander of the Korean Red Guards. When Khabarovsk was captured by the White Russian Army on September 4, 1918, he was arrested on September 10 while fleeing with Kim Alexandra Petrovna and others, and was released after interrogation and summary trial.

=== Activities of the Provisional Government of the Republic of Korea ===
==== Interim government participation and withdrawal ====
When the Provisional Government of the Republic of Korea was promoted at home and abroad in 1919, he was appointed as the Vice-General of the Staff of the Hanseong Provisional Government, as Chief of Staff at the Old Korean National Assembly, and as Chief of Military Service at the Shanghai Provisional Government. After the establishment of the integrated provisional government in August 1919, he served as the head of the military service.

In July 1919, he was dispatched to Jilin by order of the Provisional Government to promote the integration of the warlords of each Korean independence movement in East Samseong Fortress in Manchuria. At this time, he was appointed to the Military Government 司督辦 in Jilin, Korea. He promoted the integration movement of the Korean Independence Army factions in Manchuria and recruited military funds. In 1922, he was appointed as the military general of the Provisional Government of the Republic of Korea and served until April 1924.

In 1921, he participated in the Goryeo Communist Party Congress held in Irkutsk, became a central member of the Goryeo Revolution Party, and temporarily left the provisional government. When the Goryeo Revolution Party was founded in Jilin Province, Manchuria, in April 1926, he participated as a founding father and was appointed as a member of the Goryeo Revolution Party Central Party. In 1930, he returned to the Provisional Government and took office as a member of the Provisional State Council and as the head of the military service.

==== Returning to Provisional Government, Participating in Liberation Army ====
After the Mukden incident in September 1931, Kim organized the Sino-Korean Alliance in China and was appointed as a State Council member of the Provisional Government. He participated in the founding of the Korean National Revolution Party in Nanjing in 1935, along with Kim Kyu-sik, Ji Cheong-cheon, and Kim Won-bong. When promoting the integration of the Korean People's Party, the Korean Revolution Party, and the Korean Independence Party in 1938, he participated in the integrated Korean Independence Party and was appointed as the central executive member of the Korean-German Party. He was also shot and injured by former Korean National Revolutionary Party member Yi Unhwan during a meeting with Kim Ku at the Nammokcheong in Changsha, China, on May 6, 1938.

On October 25, 1939, he was elected as a member of the State Council of the Provisional Government and the Chief of Staff of the Cabinet. In May 1940, he was elected as one of the central executive members of the Korean Independence Party. After the establishment of the Korean Liberation Army in Chongqing, Sichuan Province, in 1940, he oversaw the Liberation Army and the military policies and activities of the provisional government.

In February 1945, he left the Korea Independence Party, founded the Shinhan Democratic Party with Hongjin (洪震) and others, and led the new party.

=== After liberation from Japan's colonial rule ===
Ryu Tongnyŏl had been a right-wing politician since returning home. In December 1945, he attended a welcome party for the provisional government held at Seoul Stadium. Around 2:20 pm, on the second floor of the Chosun Life Insurance Company, Syngman Rhee, Yi Si-yeong, Kim Kyu-sik, and Ryu Dong-ryeol opened the window and greeted the welcoming procession. In 1946, Chough Pyung-ok was appointed to United States Army Military Government in Korea. Lee Beom-seok, Chi Ch'ŏngch'ŏn, Won Yong-deok, and Sohn Won-yil were involved in the creation of the Joseon National Defense Security Guard along with others. Cho Byung-ok described in his book My Memoir that he commended Ryu Tongnyŏl while uncertain of his abilities. Ryu Tongnyŏl was initially resistant to participing in the military government, but he accepted its validity through repeated visits and telephone calls, including from Lee Eung-jun, that the army of the new homeland should inherit the laws of the Korean Liberation Army. The Korean National Defense Security Guard later became the Republic of Korea Armed Forces. However, as a dispute over arrest powers between the National Defense Security Guard and the police arises, he came into conflict with Cho Byung-ok.

On February 14, 1946, at the beginning of the Representative Democratic Council, he was elected chairman of the National Defense Commission. On 20 August 1949, he was elected to the Standing Committee of the National Jinyoung Reinforcement Committee.

==== Last years ====
After the Korean War broke out, he was kidnapped to North Korea. Shortly after the outbreak of the War, the People's Army and political workers in the North, who occupied Seoul, rushed to take Kim Kyu-shik, and other people who participated in inter-Korean negotiations and those who were released from prison, to the North. Unlike most of the provisional government factors, General Ryu Dong-ryul, who had participated in the U.S. military government and served as the head of the U.S. military council, was of course a target. On October 18, 1950, Ryu Dong-yeol, who was 72 years old at the time, died at a farmhouse in North Pyongan Province. He was buried at the Patriotic Yeolsa tomb in Shinri-ri, southwest of Pyongyang.

Ryu Mi-young, former chairman of the Central Committee of the Chondoist Chongu Party, is the daughter of Ryu Tongnyŏl. Choe Deok-sin who defected to the North after serving as foreign minister is his son-in-law. Independence activist Choi Dong-oh is an in-law.

== Controversy ==
=== Opposition to the appointment of a high-ranking officer from a non-Yangban family ===
Ryu Tongnyŏl embarrassed the U.S. military government by opposing the appointment of a high-ranking officer who was not from a Yangban family.

A U.S. Army captain who was seconded to the military government at the time James Harry Hausman kept records of Ryu's opposition to the appointment of one of them, Kim Jong-gap. It was when Lieutenant Kim Jong-gap, a senior officer in the 8th Regiment of Chuncheon, was promoted to the rank of captain. He served as a division commander during the Korean War and later retired as a lieutenant general in the Army, until his rank of deputy defense minister. Hausmann saw Kim Jong-gap as the right person, but his promotion order was not issued. General Ryu Tongnyŏl, the vice-president of the National Assembly, was holding up the appointment.

Regarding the reason for opposing Kim Jong-gap's promotion, he said that the officers of the Joseon Guard must be from Yangban. The U.S. military government was embarrassed. Hausmann said, "I don't know the family of Kim Jong-gap well, but Ryu Tongnyŏl didn't think he was the right man to be a high-ranking officer in Joseon."

Hausman said, "It was a ridiculous position to have a problem with personnel management due to the Yangban controversy, which had nothing to do with ability, even though it was regrettable for a single officer." I was helping to open a Korea Military Academy while increasing the number of officers through local commissioned officers to cultivate scarce officers. The Yuzhang army continued to bring "Yangban" as a condition of being an officer. However, such words could not have worked in the context of organizing a new guard. There was no basis for any United States Armed Forces organization law that only the yangban should become officers.

Ryu Tongnyŏl insisted that people who were not from aristocrats should not be senior officers, and the U.S. military persuaded that there was no basis in the U.S. military organization law that only aristocrats should serve as officers.

== Relationship to Yi Kang, Prince Ui of the Korean Empire ==
Ryu Jeong-sun, the illegitimate daughter (庶女) of Ryu Tongnyŏl, was a concubine of Prince Yi Woo (興永君), an illegitimate son (庶子) of Yi Kang, a member of the Korean Imperial Family (Joseon Dynasty).

== After death ==
- In the Democratic People's Republic of Korea he was regarded as a patriotic martyr of the Democratic People's Republic of Korea.
- In 1989, Government of South Korea posthumously awarded him the Order of Merit for National Foundation in honor of his achievements.
- On July 31, 2008, the Republic of Korea's Ministry of Patriots and Veterans Affairs selected Ryu Tongnyŏl, who served as a member of the Provisional Government's State Council and worked hard to cultivate the armed independence movement and the Korean Liberation Army, as the "August Independence Activist".
