= Pyongyang University of Foreign Studies =

University in Pyongyang, North Korea

- 평양외국어대학
- Type: Public
- Established: 15 November 1949; 76 years ago
- Location: Pyongyang, Democratic People's Republic of Korea; 39°3′55″N 125°46′4″E

- Pyongyang University of Foreign Studies
- Chosŏn'gŭl: 평양외국어대학
- Hancha: 平壤外國語大學
- Revised Romanization: Pyeongyang Oegugeo Daehak
- McCune–Reischauer: Pyŏngyang Oegugŏ Taehak

The Pyongyang University of Foreign Studies is a five-year university in Pyongyang, North Korea, specializing in language education.

== History ==
The university was split off from Kim Il-sung University in 1964. North Korea's state-run Korean Central News Agency gives its foundation date as 15 November 1949. It does not have as high a reputation as those of Kim Il-sung University's foreign languages division, which trains members of the political elite; most graduates go on to become working-level diplomats or work in the intelligence service.

== Structure ==
In total, 22 languages are taught at PUFS. The university has separate colleges for students of English, Russian, Chinese, and Japanese; the so-called "Ethnic Languages College" offers instruction in a further 18 languages: Hungarian, Arabic, Malay, Khmer, Thai, Lao, Persian, Hindi, Urdu, German, Bulgarian, Czech, Polish, French, Italian, Portuguese, Romanian, and Spanish.

== Notable students, faculty, and alumni ==
- Charles Robert Jenkins, American defector and former English teacher; his daughters Brinda and Mika formerly attended as students
- James Dresnok, son of American defector James Joseph Dresnok
- Ri Yong-ho
- Thae Yong-ho, defector from North Korea, formerly North Korea's deputy ambassador to the United Kingdom; current member of the National Assembly in South Korea

== See also ==
- List of universities in North Korea
