= Ryu Hyun-woo (diplomat) =

Former North Korea ambassador

Ryu Hyun-woo (Korean: 류현우; born in 1973 in Pyongyang) is a former North Korean ambassador to Kuwait. He defected to South Korea in September 2019. Ryu’s wife is the daughter of Jon Il-chun, who oversaw operations of North Korea’s Room 39 for over a decade. Ryu was posted to Syria from 2010 to 2013.

== See also ==
- Thae Yong-ho
