= Yun Myung-chan =

North Korean footballer

Personal information
- Date of birth: 1949
- Place of birth: Pyongyang, North Korea
- Date of death: 8 December 2017 (aged 67-68)
- Place of death: Soonchunhyang University Hospital, Seoul, South Korea
- Height: 1.80 m (5 ft 11 in)
- Position: Defender

Senior career*
Years	Team	Apps	(Gls)
1964–1976	February 8		

International career
1968–1976	North Korea		

Managerial career
- Pyongyang
- 1992–1993: North Korea (interim)
- * Club domestic league appearances and goals

- Yun Myung-chan
- Hangul: 윤명찬
- Hanja: 尹明燦
- RR: Yun Myeongchan
- MR: Yun Myŏngch'an

Yun Myung-chan (Korean: 윤명찬; 1949 – 17 December 2017) was a North Korean footballer and football manager.

== Early life ==
Born in Pyongyang in 1949, Yun and his brother were raised by his mother after his father defected to South Korea in 1950 during the Korean War.

== Playing career ==
In 1964, after graduating high school, Yun joined February 8 Sports Club. He went on to represent the North Korea national football team from 1968 until his retirement in 1976.

== Managerial career ==
Yun served as interim manager of the North Korea national football team between 1992 and 1993.

== Defection, later life and death ==
In January 1992, Yun found that his cousin had been living in Hawaii, and asked her to bring his father to China. In July of the same year, on his return from the 1992 AFC U-16 Championship in Saudi Arabia, Yun met with his father in a restaurant in Beijing. By July 1998, North Korean authorities had found out that Yun was in contact with his father, and Yun escaped to China via the Tumen River, leaving his wife and four children behind. He relocated to South Korea in April 1999, and in July and October of the same year, three of his children tried to also flee North Korea, however, his youngest son was caught and returned to North Korea.

Following his defection to South Korea, Yun worked as a member of the K League, before running a restaurant in Daegu.

Yun died on 8 December 2017 in Seoul, at the age of 68.
