= Jeong Haneul =

Korean YouTuber and former soldier (born 1994)

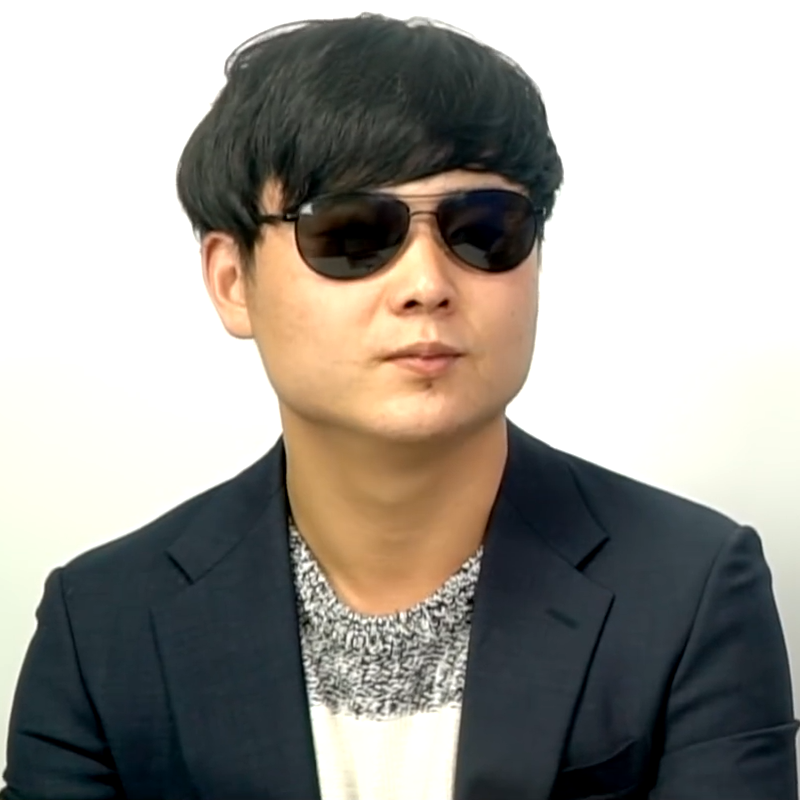
- Jeong in 2021
- Born: 1994 (age 31–32); Hamhung, North Korea
- Occupations: YouTuber; film director; actor

YouTube information
- Channel: 북시탈tv
- Years active: 2015–present
- Subscribers: 98.3 thousand
- Views: 16 million

Korean name
- Hangul: 정하늘
- RR: Jeong Haneul
- MR: Chŏng Hanŭl
- Last updated: 14 April 2026

Jeong Haneul (Korean: 정하늘, born 1994) is a South Korean YouTuber and film director. A former North Korean soldier serving in the Korean People's Army, he defected to the South in August 2012. After moving to South Korea, he started a YouTube channel called Bukshital TV (북시탈tv) and began working in the film industry. He made his directorial debut with the 2024 short film Two Soldiers (Korean: 두 병사; RR: Du byeongsa), which was based on his personal experiences in North Korea.

== Life and career ==
=== North Korea ===
Jeong Haneul was born in 1994 in Hamhung, North Korea. When Jeong Haneul was a boy, his father worked at a chemical factory and his mother sold bread, rice cakes, and shoes at jangmadang markets. He dreamed of becoming a football player and joining the North Korea national football team, but due to financial struggles he instead joined the Korean People's Army after middle school and was stationed at the Korean Demilitarized Zone. He served in the Civil Police Force of the Army's 2nd Corps.

Jeong was severely malnourished during his time in the military. He weighed only 43 kilograms (95 lb) when he first arrived in the South. According to Jeong, his squadron leader pressured him to steal from locals to eat, and threatened him with violence if he refused. Jeong became disillusioned with North Korean life, questioning why leaders like Kim Jong Il and Kim Jong Un appeared well-fed while ordinary soldiers went hungry. He recalled losing 10 kilograms (22 lb) in his first month of service due to malnutrition. He decided to defect after reading a pamphlet sent over the border by the South Korean military that said, "The Republic of Korea is an economic powerhouse with abundant electricity and lush forests".

In August 2012, while his squadron leader slept, Jeong defected to the South armed with an AK-47 and two grenades. He planned to use the grenades to commit suicide if he was caught. The electrified fences of the Demilitarized Zone had been damaged by a typhoon, allowing him to cross safely. Because Korea had been divided for 70 years, he feared that the languages of the countries would have diverged enough to make communication impossible, so he was relieved when a South Korean border guard spoke to him in Korean.

=== South Korea ===
After defecting to South Korea, Jeong lived in Hanawon until 2013. He began working at various jobs such as construction sites and chicken slaughterhouses. He tried to live in a seminary, but struggled with the prayer routine. He lived in various boarding houses until 2015, when he became eligible for a rental home after turning 20. He continued to work various jobs that he found unsatisfactory. He began university in 2017 and studied political science and diplomacy at the Hankuk University of Foreign Studies. During this time, he visited over 20 other countries.

In South Korea, Jeong Haneul met Kim Kang-yu, another former North Korean soldier who defected. The two started a YouTube channel called Bukshital TV (북시탈tv). Jeong is known for wearing sunglasses in all of his videos. On the channel, the two make videos about life in North Korea and their experiences in the military. They also invite other defectors to speak on the channel and share their stories. His channel gained widespread popularity in the 2020s, which he attributed to South Koreans spending more time online due to the COVID-19 pandemic in South Korea.

In 2021, Jeong consulted and acted in a film called Escape (Korean: 탈주; RR: talju). This experience inspired him to begin working in the film industry. In 2024, Jeong wrote and directed the short film Two Soldiers (Korean: 두 병사; RR: Du Byeongsa), loosely based on his own experiences in the Korean People's Army. The film was published by the Unification Media Group, a South Korean company in support of Korean reunification. The purpose of the film was to showcase the hardships of North Korean soldiers as well as to illustrate the inequalities of the North Korean caste system, called songbun. The film features an abusive officer named Jin Chul, who was inspired by a schoolmate of Jeong's from a higher caste. Parts of the film's story were intentionally exaggerated to illustrate a point about the discrimination inherent in songbun policy. Jeong has stated that his dream is to become president of the Pyongyang Film and Drama University after Korean reunification.

On 14 July 2025, Jeong hosted the celebrations for North Korean Defectors' Day at the Starfield COEX Mall in Seoul.

== Filmography ==
Filmography of Jeong Haneul
Year	Title	Role	Notes	Refs.
2021	Escape (Korean: 탈주; RR: talju)	Production advisor and minor acting role	Jeong's acting debut	
2024	Two Soldiers (Korean: 두 병사; RR: Du byeongsa)	Writer and director	Jeong's directorial debut	
