= Ryu Mi-yong =

North Korean politician (1921–2016)

- Born: February 14, 1921; Harbin, Heilongjiang, China
- Died: November 23, 2016 (aged 95); Pyongyang, North Korea
- Spouse: Choe Deok-sin (m. 1937)
- Children: Choe In-guk
- Father: Ryu Dong-ryol

- Ryu Mi-yong
- Hangul: 류미영
- Hanja: 柳美英
- RR: Ryu Miyeong
- MR: Ryu Miyŏng

Ryu Mi-yong (Korean: 류미영; 14 February (Note: 7 January according to the lunar calendar) 1921 – 23 November 2016) was the chairwoman of the North Korean Chondoist Chongu Party. She was a standing committee member of the 10th Supreme People's Assembly. She was known as a defector from South Korea to the North.

== Biography ==
Ryu was the only daughter born in Harbin to independence activist Ryu Dong-ryol. She married Choe Deok-sin in 1937 in China. She and her husband Choe Deok-sin defected to the North in 1986. In 2000, she led a delegation of defectors to the South on an officially sanctioned reunion with family they left behind. Ryu died of lung cancer in November 2016. Ryu's second son, Choe In-guk, reportedly defected to North Korea in July 2019.

Ryu had received the Order of Kim Il Sung, Order of Kim Jong Il, Order of the National Flag and National Reunification Prize.

On her funeral committee were:

1. Yang Hyong-sop
2. Kim Yong-chol
3. Kim Yong-dae
4. Jon Yong-nam
5. Ju Yong-gil
6. Ri Myong-gil
7. Kim Jong-sung
8. Ri Song-won
9. Pak Myong-chol
10. Ri Kil-song
11. Yun Jong-ho

== Awards and honors ==
A frame displaying Ryu's decorations was placed at the foot of her bier during her funeral.

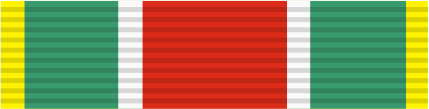

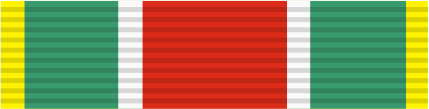
