= South Korean defectors =

South Koreans who defect to North Korea

Many, but not all, South Korean defectors cross the Korean Demilitarized Zone (DMZ) that separates the countries.

After the Korean War, 333 South Korean people who were detained in North Korea as prisoners of war chose to stay in North Korea. During subsequent decades of the Cold War, some people of South Korean origin defected to North Korea as well. They include Roy Chung, a former U.S. Army soldier who defected to North Korea through East Germany in 1979. Aside from defection, North Korea has been accused of abduction in the disappearances of some South Koreans.

Occasionally, North Koreans who have defected to South Korea decide to return. Since South Korea does not permit its naturalized citizens to travel to the North, they have made their way back to their home country illegally, and thus became "double defectors". From a total of 25,000 North Korean defectors living in South Korea, about 800 are missing, some of whom may have returned to the North. The South Korean Ministry of Unification recognizes only 13 defections officially, as of 2014.

== Background ==
Both sides have recognized the propaganda value of defectors, even immediately after the Division of Korea in 1945. Since then, the number of defectors has been used by both the North and the South to try to prove the superiority of their respective political systems (the country of destination).

North Korean propaganda has targeted South Korean soldiers patrolling the Korean Demilitarized Zone (DMZ).

== Aftermath of the Korean War ==
A total of 357 prisoners of war detained in North Korea after the Korean War chose to stay in North Korea rather than be repatriated home to the South. These included 333 South Koreans, 23 Americans, and one Briton. Eight South Koreans and two of the Americans later changed their mind. However, the exact number of prisoners of war held by North Korea and China has been disputed since 1953, due to unaccounted South Korean soldiers. Several South Koreans defected to the North during the Cold War: In 1953, Kim Sung Bai, a captain in the South Korean air force, defected to North Korea with his P-51 Mustang. In 1985, Ra il Ryong, a South Korean private, defected to North Korea and requested asylum. In 1988, a Korean employee at a U.S. army unit in South Korea defected to North Korea. His name was Son Chang-gu, a transport officer.

During the Cold War, several U.S. Army servicemen defected to North Korea. One of them, Roy Chung, was born to South Korean immigrants. Unlike the others who defected across the DMZ, he defected by first crossing the border between West and East Germany in 1979. His parents accused North Korea of abducting him. The United States was not interested in investigating the case, as he was not a "security risk", and in similar cases it was usually impossible to prove that a kidnapping had occurred. There were several other cases of South Koreans mysteriously disappearing and moving to North Korea at that time, including the case of a geology teacher from Seoul who disappeared in April 1979 while on a holiday in Norway. Some South Koreans also accused North Korea of attempting to kidnap them while staying abroad. These alleged kidnapping attempts occurred mainly in Europe, Japan or Hong Kong.

== Double defectors ==
There are people who have defected from North Korea to South Korea, and then have defected back to North Korea again. In the first half of 2012 alone, there were 100 cases of "double defectors" like this. A possible reason includes widespread discrimination faced in South Korea. 7.2% of the North Korean defectors living in South Korea are unemployed, which is twice the national average. In 2013, there were 800 North Korean defectors unaccounted for out of 25,000 people. They might have gone to China or Southeast Asian countries on their way back to North Korea. South Korea's Unification Ministry officially recognizes only 13 cases of double defectors as of 2014.

South Korea's laws do not allow naturalized North Koreans to return. North Korea has accused South Korea of abducting and forcibly interning those who want to and has demanded that they be allowed to leave.

== Contemporary South Korean-born defectors ==
North Korea has targeted its own defectors with propaganda in attempts to lure them back as double defectors, but contemporary South Korean defectors born outside of North Korea are generally not welcome to defect to the North. In recent years there have been seven people who tried to leave South Korea, but they were detained for illegal entry in North Korea, and ultimately repatriated.

There have also been fatalities as a result of failed defections. One defector died in a failed murder-suicide attempt by her husband while in detention. One person who attempted to defect was shot and killed by South Korean military forces in September 2013.

This is an incomplete list of notable cases of defections from South Korea to North Korea.

- 1986
  - Choe Deok-sin, a former South Korean Foreign Minister defected with his wife, Ryu Mi-yong, to North Korea.
- 1996
  - Paek Hung-ryong, a 30 year old former Nanmuri Screen representative and Agency for National Security Planning agent, according to KCNA, with his wife Jin Chan I, 25, defected to North Korea in December 1996. Paek claimed that he came to the North to "expose the ANSP tentacle in the North" and that he and his wife "yearned for the North". Paek Hung-ryong wrote an article in the Rodong Sinmun newspaper named "Poisonous spider, king of fascism lording it over people" in the March 13, 1997 edition. A mass meeting was held in mid January 1997 for both of them in Pyongyang.
- 1997
  - Han Kyong-son, a 36 year old South Korean boilerman in a Taejon hotel, defected to the North via a third country in early July 1997. When interviewed on July 17, 1997, he declared that "since the election of Kim Young-Sam, a large number of decadent amusement and service centres have appeared in South Korea, causing such evils as murder, raping and robbery", and that he "defected to the North because ordinary people including him cannot live a life worthy of man in South Korea." He was awarded a DPR Korea order and a money prize on July 22, 1997, during a meeting, and was welcomed by Pyongyangites.
- 1998
  - Song Ki-chan, a South Korean fisherman from Incheon defected to North Korea. Song sailed his trawler to an unnamed port in the North.
  - Yun Song-sik, a 61 year old activist from South Jeolla Province, and member of the Central Executive Committee of the Social People's Party in South Korea, defected to the North in early December 1998. He declared that "He has come to the north with a determination to make worthwhile contributions to the struggle for national reunification under the politics of the northern half of Korea". On January 14, 1999, a mass meeting was held in his honor in Pyongyang and received a DPR Korea order and a money prize. He became a permanent member of the Consultative Council of Former South Korean Politicians in the North for the Promotion of Peaceful Reunification in 1999, often criticizing the South Korean government, notably on the National Security Act, and the United States. He published two books; "Under the Care of the Great Sun" (2001) and "자주 통일 의 기치 따라" (2004).
- 2004
  - A 33 year old South Korean soldier named Chen was arrested for violating the National Security Law by secretly crossing in to North Korea and providing information about the military unit he served in. Chen made it to Hoeryong in North Hamgyŏng Province of North Korea by crossing the Tumen River running through the Jilin province of China. Deported by the North as an illegal entrant and repatriated to South Korea from China, Chen was suspected of providing military information to North Korea like the location of the air force fighter wing he served in and the location of anti-air batteries.
- 2005
  - A 57 year-old South Korean fisherman named Hwang Hong-ryon in the Hwangman-ho crossed the Northern Limit Line into North Korea whilst reportedly "dead drunk". The South Korean navy fired some 20 warning shots from various arms, including a 60 mm mortar, but were unable to stop the ship.
- 2009
  - 30 year old Kang Tong-rim cut a hole in the demilitarized zone fence and defected whilst wanted on assault charges in South Korea. He was later deported back to the south. The hole was not found until over 24 hours later when South Korea was alerted through North Korean media.
- 2019
  - Choe In-guk, the son of former South Korean Foreign Minister Choe Deok-sin, said he had decided to "permanently resettle" in North Korea to honour his parents' wish that he live there and devote himself to the unification of the Korean peninsula, according to North Korea’s state-controlled news website Uriminzokkiri.
- 2022
  - An unidentified South Korean citizen had defected to North Korea at the start of January by crossing into the Demilitarized Zone. South Korea's military identified the man as a North Korean defector who defected to South Korea via a similar route a year ago.

== List of notable defectors ==
- Choe Deok-sin, South Korean foreign minister
- Ryu Mi-yong, the chairwoman of Chondoist Chongu Party and wife of Choe
- Kim Bong-han, researcher of acupuncture
- Oh Kil-nam, a South Korean economist who later defected back to the South
- Shin Suk-ja, the wife of Oh Kil-nam, who was held together with their daughters as prisoners of conscience
- Ri Sung-gi, a North Korean chemist known both for his invention of vinylon, and possible involvement in nuclear weapons research
- Roy Chung (born Chung Ryeu-sup), the fifth U.S. Army defector to the North

== See also ==
- Americans in North Korea
- List of Western Bloc defectors, for other South Korean defectors who are not listed here
- North Korean defectors
