= Roy Chung =

American defector to North Korea (c. 1957 – c. 2004)

- Born: Chung Ryeu-sup c. 1957; Seoul, South Korea
- Died: c. 2004 (aged c. 46–47)
- Military career
- Allegiance: South Korea (1957–1973); United States (1973–1979); North Korea (1979–2004)
- Branch: United States Army
- Service years: 1978–1979 (defected)
- Rank: Private first class

Roy Chung (c. 1957 – c. 2004), born Chung Ryeu-sup (Korean: 정류섭), was a soldier who is widely believed to be the fifth of seven United States Army soldiers to have defected to North Korea after the Korean War.

== Biography ==
Chung and his family were South Korean immigrants who arrived in the United States in 1973. According to his father, Chung Soo-oh, he had joined the Army to get education benefits. He disappeared and was reported AWOL on June 5, 1979, while serving with his unit near Bayreuth, West Germany (about 30 miles (48 kilometers) from the borders of Czechoslovakia and East Germany). After 30 days he became classified as a deserter. He was 22 and a Private First Class.

Two months after his disappearance in Europe, North Korea's international broadcasting service Radio Pyongyang (now Voice of Korea) announced his defection, stating that he "could no longer endure the disgraceful life of national insult and maltreatment he had to lead in the U.S. imperialist aggressor Army." The other five men who disappeared into North Korea did so by directly crossing the Korean Demilitarized Zone.

Chung's family and Korean-American groups believed that he had been abducted and was not a defector, as widely believed. They compared his disappearance to several documented abductions by North Korean agents, most notably the kidnapping of actress Choi Eun-hee. Officials of the United States Department of State and the Pentagon at the time stated that they had no reason to doubt North Korea's claims of defection. They made no major inquiries into the matter because Chung had no access to classified information and was not a security threat.

In 2004, filmmaker Nicholas Bonner (co-creator of the documentary Crossing the Line) reported that he heard Chung had died of natural causes.

== See also ==
- List of American and British defectors in the Korean War
