= Yoo Sang-joon =

North Korean defector with South Korean citizenship

- Hangul: 유상준
- RR: Yu Sangjun
- MR: Yu Sangjun

Pseudonym
- Hangul: 남홍철
- RR: Nam Hongcheol
- MR: Nam Hongch'ŏl

Yoo Sang-joon is a North Korean defector with South Korean citizenship. He is sometimes known under his pseudonym Nam Hong-chul, which he used to maintain his anonymity while in northeast China working to help fellow defectors reach South Korea.

== Biography ==
Yoo lived in North Korea with his wife and two sons. After the death of his wife and younger son due to the ongoing North Korean famine, during which they ate nothing but grass for months, he chose to leave the country in 1998 with his remaining son Yoo Chul-min. While in China, he worked at odd jobs in construction and manual labour; eventually, he grew weary of living in fear of arrest and deportation to North Korea by Chinese police, and gave up his son to the custody of a family of ethnic Koreans with Chinese citizenship, hoping to give him a better life. He then smuggled himself out of the country. After his arrival in South Korea, he worked for a manufacturing company. His initial attempts to locate his son Chul-min failed, as Chul-min had changed his name and date of birth on his documents. With the assistance of defector aid organisation Durihana, he was able to locate his son, and make arrangements for people smugglers to bring him out of China to Mongolia and from there to Korea.

Yoo's son died of exhaustion during the journey through the desert. Yoo's grief led him to convert to Christianity, and also to pledge to help smuggle fellow defectors out of China. He made it his first priority to help orphans travelling without their parents. In October 2007, he was arrested in a Chinese police operation aimed at dismantling the escape network, and threatened with repatriation to North Korea, despite his South Korean citizenship. He was released and deported to South Korea on 16 December.
