= Loyola University Hospital =

Coordinates: 41°51′37″N 87°50′6″W

Geography
- Location: Maywood, Illinois, United States

Links
- Lists: Hospitals in Illinois

Loyola University Hospital is a 569-licensed-bed American hospital on the campus of Loyola University Medical Center in the western suburbs of Maywood, Illinois, which houses a Level 1 trauma center and a Ronald McDonald Children's Hospital.

In 2011 the hospital opened a Geriatric Fracture Program to support elderly patients.

In 2008 the hospital opened a new patient tower, costing $120 million.
