= 1Verse =

South Korean boy band

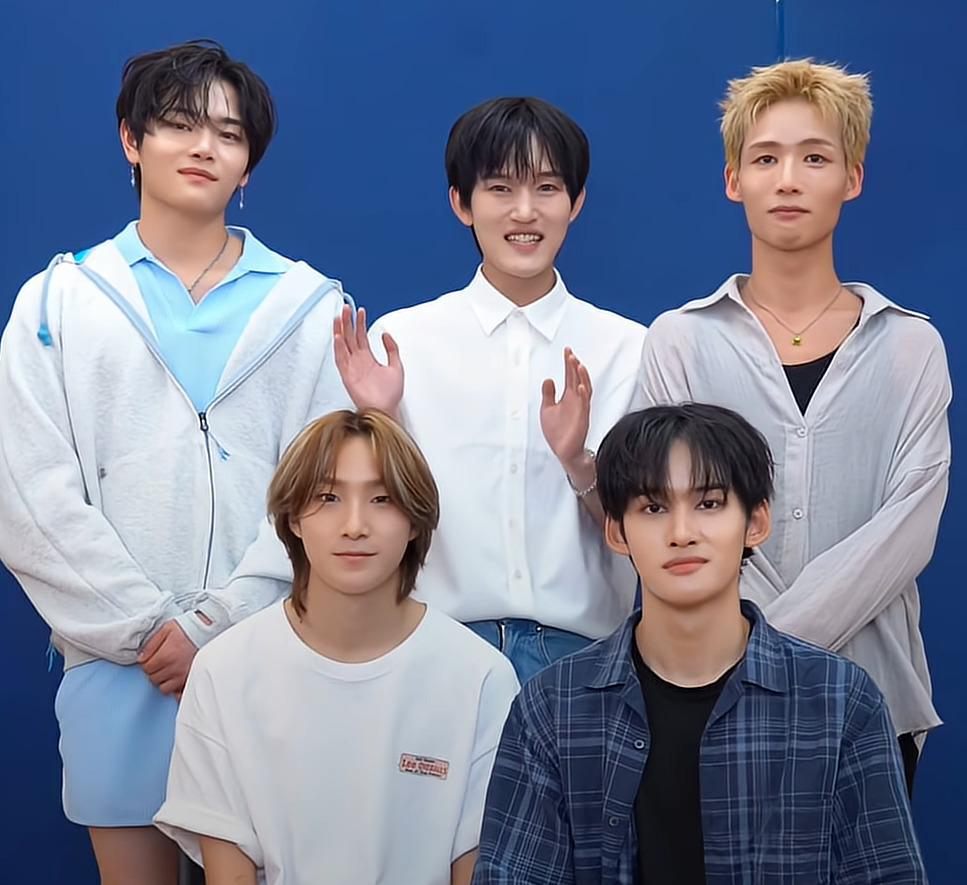
- 1Verse in 2025; L–R: Aito, Seok, Hyuk (top row); Kenny and Nathan (bottom row)

Background information
- Origin: Seoul, South Korea
- Genre: K-pop
- Years active: 2025–present
- Label: Singing Beetle
- Members: Hyuk; Seok; Aito; Kenny; Nathan

1Verse (Korean: 유니버스; pronounced 'universe' and stylized in all caps) is a South Korean boy band formed by Singing Beetle. The group consists of five members: Hyuk, Seok, Aito, Kenny and Nathan. Two members of the group (Hyuk and Seok) are from North Korea, making them the first South Korean boy group with North Korean defectors. They debuted on July 18, 2025, with the single album The 1st Verse.

== History ==
=== Pre-debut ===
Two of the five members of the band are North Korean defectors. Yu Hyuk, one of the members, is from North Hamgyong Province and grew up with his father and grandmother, after his parents separated and his mother defected to South Korea. His family was poor and as a child he worked odd jobs, begged on the streets and sometimes stole food to survive. He said that he usually ate only one meal a day and he never heard of K-pop music while in North Korea. Hyuk was contacted by his mother, who requested he join her in South Korea, and he undertook a six-month journey through several countries to escape, arriving in Seoul, South Korea, at age 13, in 2013. After arriving in South Korea, he became interested in K-pop, joining a music club in his first year of high school and writing rap lyrics.

The other North Korean member, Kim Seok, grew up in a region near China and was from a "relatively better-off family." He was able to listen to K-pop and watch South Korean television shows that were smuggled in with USBs and SD cards. He defected to South Korea in 2019 after several of his uncles had done so. He had been a football player in North Korea, but gave up the sport after defecting.

In 2020, Hyuk met Michelle Cho, a former representative at SM Entertainment and the founder of independent label Singing Beetle. She offered to provide rap lessons and Hyuk left his job as a factory worker to enter music full-time in 2021. He thus became the first member of the boy group SB Boyz under the Singing Beetle label, later renamed to 1Verse (pronounced "universe"). A year and a half later, Seok was added to the group. Cho, their trainer, described the two as "blank canvases" and complete beginners, noting "they had absolutely no grasp of pop culture," but praised their development and ability to "endure physical challenges."

In 2024, Hyuk released a rap song, titled "Ordinary Person" as part of a pre-debut project. By early 2024, the group had added two more members: Aito, who is Japanese and Korean, and Kenny, who is Chinese-American. A fifth member, Nathan, an American of Lao and Thai descent, joined by the end of the year.

On July 4, 2025, 1Verse released their pre-debut single, "Multiverse", co-produced by 1Verse member Hyuk. They also released a music video paired with the song.

=== 2025–present: Debut ===
On June 20, Singing Beetle announced that 1Verse would debut in July. Their debut single album The 1st Verse and the music video for its title track "Shattered" were released on July 18.

In September 2025 it was announced via 1Verse official social media channels that Hyuk would be taking a hiatus from the group due to personal and health reasons. In October 2025 1Verse announced their first tour titled "Shattered", which began in January 2026.

In January 2026, 1Verse released their first comeback, a single by the name of "WABIF" (Wide Awake Before I Fall).

== Members ==
- Hyuk (혁)
- Seok (석)
- Aito (아이토)
- Kenny (케니)
- Nathan (네이슨)

== Discography ==
=== Single albums ===
Title	Album details	Peak chart positions	Sales
Title	Album details	KOR	Sales
The 1st Verse	Released: July 18, 2025; Label: Singing Beetle; Format: CD, digital download, streaming; Track listing: 1. "Multiverse"; 2. "Shattered" (English version); 3. "Shattered" (Korean version)	39	KOR: 5,598

=== Singles ===
Title	Year	Album
"Multiverse"	2025	The 1st Verse
"Shattered"	2025	The 1st Verse
"WABIF (Wide Awake Before I Fall)"	2026	Non-album single
"Loop"	2026	Loop
