= Choe Deok-sin =

South Korean defector (1914–1989)

- 최덕신
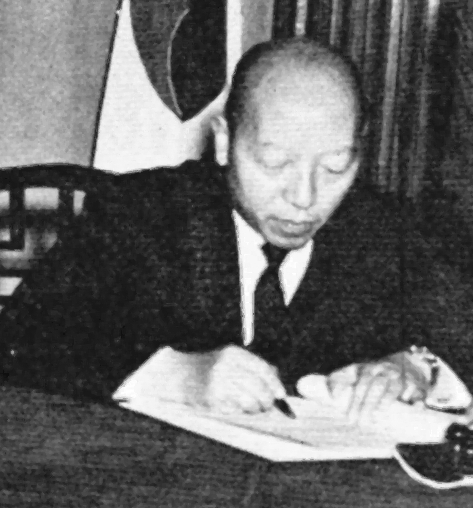
- Choe Deok-sin signing a trade agreement with Malaysia in 1962

Minister of Foreign Affairs and Trade of the Republic of Korea
- In office October 11, 1961 – March 15, 1963
- President: Park Chung Hee
- Preceded by: Song Yo-chan
- Succeeded by: Kim Yong-shik

Vice-Chairman of the Committee for the Peaceful Reunification of the Fatherland
- In office ??–1989
- President: Kim Il Sung

Personal details
- Born: September 17, 1914 Uiju County, Heianhoku Province, Empire of Japan
- Died: November 14, 1989 (aged 75) Pyongyang, North Korea
- Spouse: Ryu Mi-yong

Korean name
- Hangul: 최덕신
- Hanja: 崔德新
- RR: Choe Deoksin
- MR: Ch'oe Tŏksin

Choe Deok-sin (Korean: 최덕신; September 17, 1914 – November 14, 1989) was a South Korean Foreign Minister who later defected with his wife, Ryu Mi-yong, to North Korea.

Choe was born in Uiju County, North Pyongan Province. In 1936, he graduated from the Republic of China Military Academy, and served as a Republic of China Army officer. By the end of World War II, Choe had been promoted to colonel. After the war Choe returned to South Korea and entered the national army academy as a second lieutenant. In 1949, Choe entered the United States Military Academy. On July 14, 1950, Choe returned to South Korea. Choe served as a commanding general of the South Korean 11th Division under the United States IX Corps during the Korean War. His division carried out the Sancheong-Hamyang and Geochang massacres. After the military coup, from 1961 to 1963, Choe served as a Foreign Minister and Ambassador to West Germany. He stepped down from government office after being dismissed from his ambassadorship in 1967.

He immigrated with his wife Ryu Mi-yong to the United States in 1976, where they had been known for their opposition to the policies of the South Korean military government. In 1986, Choe and his wife relocated to North Korea from the United States. Choe served as a chief of the central committee of the Chondoist Chongu Party and vice-chairman of the Committee for the Peaceful Reunification of the Fatherland. Three years later, in 1989, Choe died at the age of 75. Choe's son, Choe In-guk, reportedly defected to North Korea in July 2019.

== Bibliography ==
- Choe Deok-sin (1972). Panmunjom and After. New York: Vantage Press. OCLC 754916.
- — (1987). The Nation and I: For the Reunification of the Motherland. Pyongyang: Foreign Languages Publishing House. OCLC 17933376.
- — (1989). My Thirty Years in South Korea: Amid the Tragedy of National Division. Pyongyang: Foreign Languages Publishing House. OCLC 21567991.
- — (1990). In the Embrace of My Motherland. Pyongyang: Foreign Languages Publishing House. OCLC 27117555.

== See also ==
- Sancheong-Hamyang massacre
- Geochang massacre
- South Korean defectors
- North Korean defectors
- Hwang Jang-yop, Chairman of the Supreme People's Assembly of North Korea, highest-ranking defector from the North

Political offices
Preceded by Song Yo-chan	Minister of Foreign Affairs of South Korea; 1961–1963	Succeeded by Kim Yong-shik
