= North Koreans in South Korea =

North Koreans in South Korea
Year	Population
1992	8
1993	8
1994	52
1995	42
1996	56
1997	86
1998	71
1999	148
2000	312
2001	583
2002	1,139
2003	1,281
2004	1,894
2005	1,383
2006	2,091

As of 2006, the South Korean Ministry of Unification registered about 9,000 North Koreans in South Korea. Many thousands of them escaped from North to South as a result of the North Korean famine of 1994–1998. North Koreans living in South Korea are often mistreated at schools, denied employment, and are subject to other kinds of ethnic issues due to their being from North Korea.

== Terminology ==
The government of South Korea looked to promote unification in 2005, by diminishing the use of Cold War Era terms such as "defectors" or "escapees" when referring to North Korean Migrants. The old terms suggested negative connotations and derogatory use. Instead they opted to use a new term, saeteomin. Saeteomin means "new settlers" and emphasizes the migrant characteristics of the people.

== History ==
The Democratic People's Republic of Korea, or the DPRK, adheres to a strict Stalinist pattern of zero tolerance towards overseas migration. However, after the Korean War, North Korean defectors began to try and escape to South Korea in search of a better life. Before the start of the Korean War, the number of migrators between the North and the South was between 456,000 and 829,000. Through the years 1950–1953, an estimated 400,000–650,000 people migrated. Between 1945 and 1953, about 10 percent of the population left the North, but these numbers dramatically decreased after the war was over.

== The DMZ Line ==
The Korean Demilitarized Zone, between North and South Korea, exists to keep external and internal threats to a minimum. External threats could come from the possibility of South Korean agents making their way into the country. Any internal threats include the possibility of non-authorized attempts to leave. The DMZ Line is protected by electric fences, minefields, and soldiers. Extra support of fenced and mined beaches, patrols, and surveillance of the area make it nearly impossible to cross.

== China's role ==
As the direct journey to South Korea was so difficult, China found itself receiving a large number of North Korean defectors. If able to cross, defectors were able to find employment in Northeast China. When the North Korean Famine reached its peak in 1988–1989, almost 200,000 defectors were found in China. After radical liberalization of China, the number of defectors largely increased from 41 to 1,894 annually.

== Government assistance ==
The South Korean government, in 1997, passed the Act on Protection and Resettlement Support for the Residents Who Escaped From North Korea. The result of the act was 36,960,000 won (about $25,053 USD) for each adult defector. The government also increased job training procedures and attempted to address other problems migrants might face in their new life in South Korea. In 2005, the South Korean government launched a scholarship program that allotted up to 15.4 million won per person to achieve vocational training, certifications, and eventually jobs. Although the program gave money to assist in job searching, it also reduced the amount of settlement money from 39.5 million won to 20 million won per person.

== Economics ==
At the beginning of North Korean migration to South Korea, the population was mostly considered privileged and upper class. More recently, the population has become more heterogeneous and includes people of all education, age, and employment backgrounds. It has been found that there is a correlation between high levels of education and employment as compared to low levels of education and unemployment. Depression, PTSD, and chronic illness are also large factors in the ability to find a job after defecting. Those more likely to find jobs are men who either had an educational background or a technical license. Refugees who experience chronic illnesses make 89.5 percent less than those who do not. Similarly, those who report cases of PTSD make 184.6 percent less than those who do not experience trauma related events. In the year 2001, the average income of a North Korean migrant was 59.98 won. The average income of non-migrant South Korean citizens in 2005 was 1,390,000 won compared to the less than 1,000,000 won of North Korean migrants.

These new settlers come from many different paths on their way to South Korea, including going through China, Mongolia, and Southeast Asia. In 2003, a survey done by the Korea Institute for National Unification, showed that 24.6 percent of respondents were very satisfied with their overall life in South Korea as compared to the 1 percent of those who are very unsatisfied. In 2005, the Database Center for North Korean Human Rights, reported that 22.7 percent of respondents claimed that the biggest obstacle in their new life were "economic difficulties". Income inequality between South Korean citizens and the saeteomin was a large issue. Many reported lower incomes due to unemployment or not being able to keep the same job.

Some North Korean migrants even report problems of prejudice and discrimination. 56.5 percent of respondents from a study done by the Korea Institute for National Unification in 2005, responded yes to having faced difficulty in the workplace for being from North Korea. A large number of North Koreans in South Korea report issues with promotions and salaries compared to their South Korean colleagues.

== Education ==
For many who make the treacherous journey from North to South Korea, those with children hope to give their kids a better education. Reports show that there are large numbers of saeteomin who have difficulty in their school life. In 2005, attendance rates for middle schoolers was 58.4 percent and attendance rates for high schoolers was 10.4 percent. Even more, the dropout rate was 13.7 percent which is ten times higher than the rates of South Korean students. Reasons for these numbers include the lack of education during their time between living in North Korea and South Korea, lack of adjustment to new culture, and placement in schools.

== Interaction between North and South Koreans ==
The year 2003 showed 1.9 percent of South Koreans had no feelings towards the new settlers and 58 percent felt compatriotism. The majority of South Koreans expressed no specific connection with their new neighbors, with 1.9 percent feeling distant and 7 percent feeling very friendly. Many saeteomin face the feeling of emotional distance in their new homes. Many reasons for this include language barriers due to English loan words, slang, and the South Korean dialect.

== Geographic origin ==
In the years 1999–2003, 66 percent of North Korean settlers were found to be from North Hamgyong Province. Those from this northeastern part of the country have a background of poverty, little education, and unemployment.

== Famous defectors ==
- Hwang Jang-yop, one of the highest-ranking elite members of Pyongyang, fled North Korea in 1997. While in office, he led as a political party secretary, President of Kim Il-sung University, and personal clerk to Kim Il-sung. After disagreeing with Kim Jong-il in the 1990s over the succession of power, Hwang left the country and went to the South Korean Embassy in China where disputes over his standing were held. Eventually, he was able to fly to Seoul, where he became one of the most outspoken against the Kim regime.

== See also ==
- List of North Korean defectors in South Korea
- North Korea–South Korea relations
- North Korean defectors
