= List of Western Bloc defectors =

This is an incomplete list of Western Bloc intelligence agents, military personnel, scientists, politicians, diplomats and other prominent people, who defected to the Eastern Bloc or non-aligned countries during the Cold War and after.

== Defections before 1991 ==
| Defector | Profession/Prominence | Country of origin | Year of defection | Country of defection |
|---|---|---|---|---|
| Erwin Borchers | French Foreign Legion | Germany/France | 1945 | Viet Minh |
| Ernst Frey | French Foreign Legion | Austria/France | 1945 | Viet Minh |
| Siegfried Wenzel | French Foreign Legion | Germany/France | 1945 | Viet Minh |
| Kostas Sarantidis | French Foreign Legion | Greece/France | 1946 | Viet Minh |
| Stefan Kubiak | French Foreign Legion | Poland/France | 1946 | Viet Minh |
| Park Si-hyeong | Historian | South Korea (U.S. Occupation Zone) | 1946 | North Korea (Soviet Occupation Zone) |
| Karl-Eduard von Schnitzler | BBC journalist | West Germany (British Occupation Zone) | 1947 | East Germany (Soviet Occupation Zone) |
| Emil Selhofer | French Foreign Legion | Switzerland/France | 1947 | Viet Minh |
| George Shaw Wheeler | Foreign Economic Administration economist | United States | 1947 | Czechoslovakia |
| Annabelle Bucar | United States State Department | United States | 1948 | Soviet Union |
| Hong Myong-hui | Writer | South Korea | 1948 | North Korea |
| Kang Tae-mu | Republic of Korea Army | South Korea | 1948 | North Korea |
| Kim Sun-nam | Composer | South Korea | 1948 | North Korea |
| George Koval | Atomic spy | United States | 1948 | Soviet Union |
| James McMillin | United States Army cryptographer | United States | 1948 | Soviet Union |
| Pyo Mu-won | Republic of Korea Army | South Korea | 1948 | North Korea |
| Albert Clavier | French Army | France | 1949 | Viet Minh |
| Robert Dagleish | Foreign Office | United Kingdom | 1949 | Soviet Union |
| Gerhart Eisler | Journalist | United States | 1949 | East Germany |
| Noel Field | United States State Department | United States | 1949 | Czechoslovakia |
| Archibald Johnstone | Journalist | United Kingdom | 1949 | Soviet Union |
| James Stuart | British Army | United Kingdom | 1949 | East Germany |
| Miroslav Surý | French Foreign Legion | Czechoslovakia/France | 1949 | Viet Minh |
| František Vaňhara | French Foreign Legion | Czechoslovakia/France | 1949 | Viet Minh |
| David Young | Royal Navy | United Kingdom | 1949 | China |
| Leopold Infeld | University of Toronto physicist | Canada | 1950 | Poland |
| Ian Milner | United Nations diplomat | Australia | 1950 | Czechoslovakia |
| Ján Poláček | French Foreign Legion | Czechoslovakia/France | 1950 | Viet Minh |
| Bruno Pontecorvo | Atomic physicist | Italy/United Kingdom | 1950 | Soviet Union (via Finland) |
| John Peet | Reuters correspondent | United Kingdom | 1950 | East Germany |
| Nâzım Hikmet Ran | Poet | Turkey | 1950 | Soviet Union |
| Ri Sung-gi | Seoul National University chemistry professor | South Korea | 1950 | North Korea |
| Arna Rides | British Council medical adviser | United Kingdom | 1950 | Czechoslovakia |
| Josef Zvoník | French Foreign Legion | Czechoslovakia/France | 1950 | Viet Minh |
| Guy Burgess | Foreign Office/MI5 | United Kingdom | 1951 | Soviet Union |
| Donald Maclean | Foreign Office | United Kingdom | 1951 | Soviet Union |
| Alfred Sarant | Military engineer/Atomic spy | United States | 1951 | Poland, then the Soviet Union |
| Joel Barr | Military engineer/Atomic spy | United States | 1951 | Czechoslovakia, then the Soviet Union |
| Margaret Schlauch | New York University English professor | United States | 1951 | Poland |
| Weng Wenhao | Geologist and Kuomintang politician | Taiwan | 1951 | China |
| Heiner Braun | Track athlete (5,000 metres) | West Germany | 1952 | East Germany |
| Stefan Heym | United States Army/Writer | United States | 1952 | Czechoslovakia, then East Germany |
| Günther Gereke | Christian Democratic Union politician | West Germany | 1952 | East Germany |
| Victor Grossman | United States Army | United States | 1952 | East Germany |
| Kug Yong-am | Republic of Korea Army | South Korea | 1952 | North Korea |
| Charles Lucas | United States Army | United States | 1952 | East Germany |
| Aubrey E. Miles | United States Army | United States | 1952 | East Germany |
| Wolfgang Gans zu Putlitz | MI5 | United Kingdom | 1952 | East Germany |
| Miloud Salhi | French Army | France | 1952 | Viet Minh |
| Clarence Adams | United States Army | United States | 1953 | China |
| Howard Gayle Adams | United States Army | United States | 1953 | China |
| Albert Constant Belhomme | United States Army | United States | 1953 | China |
| Otto Grayson Bell | United States Army | United States | 1953 | China |
| Arthur Boyd | United States Army | United States | 1953 | East Germany |
| Andrew Condron | Royal Marines | United Kingdom | 1953 | China |
| Richard G. Corden | United States Army | United States | 1953 | China |
| William Cowart | United States Army | United States | 1953 | China |
| W. Glancy | British Army | United Kingdom | 1953 | East Germany |
| Rufus Douglas | United States Army | United States | 1953 | China |
| John Roedel Dunn | United States Army | United States | 1953 | China |
| Andrew Fortuna | United States Army | United States | 1953 | China |
| Hans-Joachim Geyer | Gehlen Organization | West Germany | 1953 | East Germany |
| Lewis Griggs | United States Army | United States | 1953 | China |
| Samuel David Hawkins | United States Army | United States | 1953 | China |
| Wolfgang Höher | Gehlen Organization | West Germany | 1953 | East Germany |
| R. Irvine | British Army | United Kingdom | 1953 | East Germany |
| Kim Sung-bai | Republic of Korea Air Force | South Korea | 1953 | North Korea |
| S. Lewes | British Army | United Kingdom | 1953 | East Germany |
| Norman M. Lowell | United States Army | United States | 1953 | East Germany |
| R.W. Louwman | Royal Netherlands Army | Netherlands | 1953 | East Germany |
| Clifford F. Murphy | United States Army | United States | 1953 | East Germany |
| Arlie Pate | United States Army | United States | 1953 | China |
| Scott Rush | United States Army | United States | 1953 | China |
| Lowell Skinner | United States Army | United States | 1953 | China |
| Larance Sullivan | United States Army | United States | 1953 | China |
| Richard Tenneson | United States Army | United States | 1953 | China |
| James Veneris | United States Army | United States | 1953 | China |
| Harold Webb | United States Army | United States | 1953 | China |
| R. Wanroy | Royal Netherlands Army | Netherlands | 1953 | East Germany |
| William White | United States Army | United States | 1953 | China |
| Morris Wills | United States Army | United States | 1953 | China |
| Aaron Wilson | United States Army | United States | 1953 | China |
| Stanislaw Zdanowski | United States Army | United States | 1953 | Poland |
| William Donal Adkins | United States Army | United States | 1954 | Soviet Union |
| Choi Man-chong | Republic of Korea Air Force | South Korea | 1954 | North Korea |
| Joseph Cort | Doctor of Medicine and University of Birmingham physiology lecturer | United States | 1954 | Czechoslovakia |
| James Davis | United States Army | United States | 1954 | Czechoslovakia |
| Bruno Folta | Radio announcer | West Germany | 1954 | Czechoslovakia |
| Raymond H. Hutto | United States Army | United States | 1954 | East Germany |
| Otto John | Bundesamt für Verfassungsschutz | West Germany | 1954 | East Germany |
| Karlfranz Schmidt-Wittmack | Bundestag deputy and Christian Democratic Union politician | West Germany | 1954 | East Germany |
| Richard Squires | British Army | United Kingdom | 1954 | Soviet Union |
| William Turner | United States Army | United States | 1954 | Soviet Union |
| Ralph Bernard Frederick Cross | Canadian Army | Canada | 1955 | East Germany |
| James W. Pulley | United States Army | United States | 1955 | East Germany |
| Manfred von Brauchitsch | Racing driver | West Germany | 1955 | East Germany |
| Ho Wei-Chin | Republic of China Air Force | Taiwan | 1955 | China |
| B.F. Holland | United States Army | United States | 1955 | East Germany |
| Horst Spanier | United States Army | United States | 1955 | East Germany |
| Wei Li-Huang | Republic of China Army | Taiwan | 1955 | China |
| Hung Chin-Shan | Republic of China Military Police | Taiwan | 1955 | China |
| Henri Maillot | French Army | France | 1956 | Algerian National Liberation Front |
| Wolf-Dieter Loebl | Bundeswehr | West Germany | 1956 | East Germany |
| Orest Stephen Makar | Photogrammetrist and Saint Louis University engineering associate professor | United States | 1956 | Soviet Union |
| Anthony Wraight | Royal Air Force | United Kingdom | 1956 | Soviet Union |
| Augustin Cabrera Oroza | Spanish Navy | Spain | 1957 | Mexico |
| Manuel Fernandez Rodriguez | Spanish Navy | Spain | 1957 | Mexico |
| Ginas Jiminez Nortes | Spanish Navy | Spain | 1957 | Mexico |
| Enrique Medina Fernandez | Spanish Navy | Spain | 1957 | Mexico |
| Jürgen Mickeleit | Bundeswehr | West Germany | 1957 | East Germany |
| Victor Rodriguez | Spanish Navy | Spain | 1957 | Mexico |
| Alfred Kaufman Stern | Philanthropist | United States | 1957 | Czechoslovakia |
| Martha Dodd Stern | Philanthropist | United States | 1957 | Czechoslovakia |
| Ernie Fletcher | United States Army | United States | 1959 | East Germany |
| Klaus Fuchs | Atomic spy | United Kingdom | 1959 | Exchanged to East Germany |
| Ho Ye-Chen | Republic of China Army | Taiwan | 1959 | China |
| Arnold Kephart | United States Army | United States | 1959 | East Germany |
| Billy Mullis | United States Army | United States | 1959 | East Germany |
| Lee Harvey Oswald | United States Marine Corps | United States | 1959 | Soviet Union via Finland, rejected from Cuba |
| Libero Ricciardelli | United States Air Force | United States | 1959 | Soviet Union |
| Franz Julius Schröder | Christian Democratic Union aide | West Germany | 1959 | East Germany |
| Arthur Wegner | University of Münster law professor | West Germany | 1959 | East Germany |
| John B. Witt | United States Army | United States | 1959 | Czechoslovakia |
| Franz Böttger | Bundeswehr | West Germany | 1960 | East Germany |
| Guy Bouchard | Canadian Army | Canada | 1960 | East Germany |
| Horst Braun | Bundesluftwaffe | West Germany | 1960 | East Germany |
| Bruce Davis | United States Army | United States | 1960 | Soviet Union |
| Joseph Dutkanicz (Dutkanich) | United States Army Military Intelligence | United States | 1960 | Soviet Union |
| Richard Gromek | Bundeswehr | West Germany | 1960 | East Germany |
| Gilbert Paul Jenkerson | British Army | United Kingdom | 1960 | East Germany |
| Bernon F. Mitchell | National Security Agency | United States | 1960 | Soviet Union |
| William H. Martin | National Security Agency | United States | 1960 | Soviet Union |
| Peter Petrich | Bundeswehr | West Germany | 1960 | East Germany |
| Serafin Sanchez | United States Air Force | United States | 1960 | Cuba |
| Paul Schlüter | Social Democratic Party of Germany politician | West Germany | 1960 | East Germany |
| Vladimir Sloboda | United States Army Military Intelligence | United States | 1960 | Soviet Union |
| John Strobl | Canadian Army | Canada | 1960 | East Germany |
| Horst Tuschla | Bundeswehr | West Germany | 1960 | East Germany |
| Otto Weissenberger | Cartographer | West Germany | 1960 | East Germany |
| Walter Barth | Bundeswehr | West Germany | 1961 | East Germany |
| Walter Hagemann | Christian Democratic Union politician and University of Münster journalism professor | West Germany | 1961 | East Germany |
| K.H. Falk | Bundesamt für Verfassungsschutz | West Germany | 1961 | East Germany |
| Fernando Ganhao | Portuguese Army | Portugal | 1961 | Mozambique Liberation Front |
| Ollie Harrington | Cartoonist | United States | 1961 | East Germany |
| Junge family | University of Washington scientists | United States | 1961 | Czechoslovakia |
| Winfried Krychowski | Bundeswehr | West Germany | 1961 | East Germany |
| Mohamed Lamari | French Army | France | 1961 | Algerian National Liberation Front |
| Wolfgang Objeglo | Bundeswehr | West Germany | 1961 | East Germany |
| Mário Moutinho de Pádua | Portuguese Army | Portugal | 1961 | Congo-Léopoldville |
| Larry Allen Abshier | United States Army | United States | 1962 | North Korea |
| Wilfried Alsguth | Bundeswehr | West Germany | 1962 | East Germany |
| Herbert Böhmer | Bundeswehr | West Germany | 1962 | East Germany |
| Heinz-Dieter Brehning | Bundeswehr | West Germany | 1962 | East Germany |
| James Joseph Dresnok | United States Army | United States | 1962 | North Korea |
| Günther Fischer | Bundeswehr | West Germany | 1962 | East Germany |
| Heinrich Frank | Bundeswehr | West Germany | 1962 | East Germany |
| R.S. Hareld | United States Army | United States | 1962 | Czechoslovakia |
| Guntram Hoffmann | Bundeswehr | West Germany | 1962 | East Germany |
| Rudolf Abel | Atomic spy | United States | 1962 | Exchanged to the Soviet Union |
| Bobby Joe Keesee | United States Army | United States | 1962 | Cuba |
| Henry Kiernan | United States Army | United States | 1962 | East Germany |
| Albert Kostede | Bundeswehr | West Germany | 1962 | East Germany |
| Richard Lang | Bundeswehr | West Germany | 1962 | East Germany |
| David Michael | Engineer | United States | 1962 | Cuba |
| Erwin Miran | Bundeswehr | West Germany | 1962 | East Germany |
| Nguyen Van Cu | Republic of Vietnam Air Force | South Vietnam | 1962 | Cambodia |
| Klaus Reichardt | Bundesluftwaffe | West Germany | 1962 | East Germany |
| Willi Salzmann | Bundeswehr | West Germany | 1962 | East Germany |
| Peter-Joseph Schödder | Bundeswehr | West Germany | 1962 | East Germany |
| Manfred Schüssler | Bundeswehr | West Germany | 1962 | East Germany |
| Horst Pilger | Bundeswehr | West Germany | 1962 | East Germany |
| Peter Pitzen | Bundeswehr | West Germany | 1962 | East Germany |
| Bodo Ratzinger | Bundeswehr | West Germany | 1962 | East Germany |
| Dieter Schmutzler | Bundeswehr | West Germany | 1962 | East Germany |
| Otto Schwarz | Bundeswehr | West Germany | 1962 | East Germany |
| Ronald Stanley | British Army | United Kingdom | 1962 | East Germany |
| Jürgen Steinigtweg | Bundesmarine Marineflieger | West Germany | 1962 | East Germany |
| Robert Stuckhaus | Bundeswehr | West Germany | 1962 | East Germany |
| Wolfgang Vogt | Bundesluftwaffe | West Germany | 1962 | East Germany |
| Berthold Wizien | Bundeswehr | West Germany | 1962 | East Germany |
| Thomas Badey | United States Army | United States | 1963 | East Germany |
| Frank Barton | United States Army | United States | 1963 | East Germany |
| Richard Bourret | Physicist | United States | 1963 | Cuba |
| Benjamin Cain | United States Army | United States | 1963 | East Germany |
| Klaus Chepelier | Bundeswehr | West Germany | 1963 | East Germany |
| Victor Norris Hamilton | National Security Agency | United States | 1963 | Soviet Union |
| Reymond Herzet | Belgian Army | Belgium | 1963 | East Germany |
| Gary Martzke | United States Army | United States | 1963 | East Germany |
| Roberto "Robert" Ramos Michelena | United States Air Force | United States | 1963 | Cuba |
| James Carl Moore | United States Army | United States | 1963 | East Germany |
| Heinrich James Newton | United States Army | United States | 1963 | East Germany |
| Jerry Wayne Parrish | United States Army | United States | 1963 | North Korea |
| Brian Patchett | British Army | United Kingdom | 1963 | East Germany |
| Christopher John Pengate | British Army | United Kingdom | 1963 | East Germany |
| Kim Philby | MI6 | United Kingdom | 1963 | Soviet Union |
| Alfred Svenson | United States Army | United States | 1963 | East Germany |
| Willard E. Valentini | United States Army | United States | 1963 | East Germany |
| Jacinto Veloso | Portuguese Air Force | Portugal | 1963 | Mozambique Liberation Front |
| Chan Chueh | Olympic Games official | Taiwan | 1964 | China |
| Cheng Yi-Ming | Intelligence Bureau | Taiwan | 1964 | China |
| Li Fung-ryong | Republic of Korea Army | South Korea | 1964 | North Korea |
| Theo van Eijck | Marine-Luchtvaartdienst | Netherlands | 1964 | Libya |
| Anatoly P. Kotloby | Rocket scientist | United States | 1964 | Soviet Union |
| Ma Ching-Shan | Olympic sharpshooter | Taiwan | 1964 | China |
| Claude Swain | United States Army | United States | 1964 | East Germany |
| Zhao Zongli | Republic of China Navy | Taiwan | 1964 | China |
| Bui Van Trach | Republic of Vietnam Air Force | South Vietnam | 1965 | Cambodia |
| Chan Chen-Chin | Republic of China Army | Taiwan | 1965 | China |
| Chen Li | Intelligence Bureau | Taiwan | 1965 | China |
| Alfred Frenzel | Social Democratic Party of Germany politician | West Germany | 1965 | Exchanged to Czechoslovakia |
| Hua Tsu-Hsin | Diplomat | Taiwan | 1965 | China |
| Charles Robert Jenkins | United States Army | United States | 1965 | North Korea |
| Glen Roy Rohrer | United States Army Military Intelligence | United States | 1965 | Czechoslovakia |
| Ana Maria Silva Pais | Daughter of PIDE Director Fernando Silva | Portugal | 1965 | Cuba |
| Li Zongren | Former Kuomintang politician, vice president and acting president of China | United States | 1965 | China |
| Nguyen Chi Canh | Huế police chief | South Vietnam | 1965 | North Vietnam |
| Stephen Biggs | British Army | United Kingdom | 1965 | East Germany |
| Harold M. Koch | Roman Catholic priest | United States | 1966 | Soviet Union |
| John Discoe Smith | United States State Department | United States | 1966 | Soviet Union |
| Nguyen Duch Hien | Republic of Vietnam Air Force | South Vietnam | 1966 | Cambodia |
| Craig Anderson | United States Navy | United States | 1967 | Sweden |
| Richard Bailey | United States Navy | United States | 1967 | Sweden via Japan |
| John Barilla | United States Navy | United States | 1967 | Sweden |
| George Blake | MI6 | United Kingdom | 1967 | Soviet Union |
| Lorenzo Brown | United States military | United States | c. 1967 | Sweden |
| Costa Calfelis | Journalist | Greece | 1967 | Switzerland |
| Des Carragher | United States military | United States | c. 1967 | Sweden |
| Jerry Condon | United States military | United States | c. 1967 | Sweden |
| Jerry Dass | Green Beret SFOD B, S-5 | United States | c. 1967 | Sweden |
| Jimmy Dotson | United States military | United States | c. 1967 | Sweden |
| John Forler | United States military | United States | c. 1967 | Sweden |
| Kenneth C. Griggs | United States Army | United States | 1967 | Cuba |
| Bob Janson | United States military | United States | c. 1967 | Sweden |
| Roy Ray Jones | United States Army | United States | 1967 | Sweden |
| Walter Harshall | United States military | United States | c. 1967 | Sweden |
| Tom Hayes | United States military | United States | c. 1967 | Sweden, later managed Clergy & Layman Concerned |
| Roger Hinchliffe | United States military | United States | c. 1967 | Sweden |
| Dick Kilmer | United States military | United States | c. 1967 | Sweden |
| Steve Kinneman | United States Army | United States | 1967 | Sweden via Thailand, and Laos |
| Michael Lindner | United States Navy | United States | 1967 | Sweden |
| William Males | United States Army | United States | c. 1967 | Sweden |
| McKinley Nolan | United States Army | United States | 1967 | North Vietnam |
| Henry Nordby | United States military | United States | c. 1967 | Sweden |
| Rich Pauley | United States military | United States | c. 1967 | Sweden |
| Richard Harwood Pearce | United States Army | United States | 1967 | Cuba |
| Irving Rubin | United States Army | United States | c. 1967 | Sweden |
| Arnold Schölzel | Bundeswehr | West Germany | 1967 | East Germany |
| David Smith | United States Army | United States | 1967 | Sweden |
| Joe Stewart | United States military | United States | c. 1967 | Sweden |
| Tseng Chao-Ping | Republic of China Air Force | Taiwan | 1967 | China |
| Herbert Washington | United States Army | United States | c. 1967 | Sweden |
| Ted Weisberg | United States military | United States | c. 1967 | Sweden |
| Terry Whitmore | United States military | United States | c. 1967 | Sweden |
| Robert Argento | United States Army | United States | 1968 | Sweden |
| Edwin Arnett | United States Army | United States | 1968 | Sweden |
| John Ashley | United States Army | United States | 1968 | Sweden |
| Samuel Brown | United States Army | United States | 1968 | Sweden |
| Gerald Burger | United States Army | United States | 1968 | Sweden |
| Robert Burroughs | United States Army | United States | 1968 | Sweden |
| Robert Carroll | United States Army | United States | 1968 | Sweden |
| Kenneth Cooper | United States Army | United States | 1968 | Sweden |
| Erwin Foster | United States Army | United States | 1968 | Sweden |
| David Haire | United States Army | United States | 1968 | Sweden |
| Rodney Huth | United States Marine Corps | United States | 1968 | Sweden |
| Edward Johnson | United States Army | United States | 1968 | Sweden |
| William Jones | United States Army | United States | 1968 | Sweden |
| Bruce Mayor | Draft evader | United States | 1968 | Sweden |
| Richard Lee McKinney | United States Marine Corps | United States | 1968 | Sweden |
| Peter Moebius | Physicist | West Germany | 1968 | East Germany |
| Justin Olson | United States Army | United States | 1968 | Sweden |
| Herbert Patzelt | European Atomic Energy Community aide | West Germany | 1968 | East Germany |
| William Percell | United States Army | United States | 1968 | Sweden |
| Ehrenfried Petras | Microbiologist | West Germany | 1968 | East Germany |
| Bruce Proctor | Former Defense Intelligence Agency analyst | United States | 1968 | Sweden |
| Richard Lee Propp | United States Army | United States | 1968 | Sweden |
| David Roman | United States Army | United States | 1968 | Sweden |
| Raymond Sansiviero | United States Marine Corps | United States | 1968 | Sweden |
| Parker Smith | United States Army | United States | 1968 | Sweden |
| Vincent Strollo | United States Army | United States | 1968 | Sweden |
| Richard Tannimura | United States Army | United States | 1968 | Sweden |
| Gregory Vitarelle | United States Army | United States | 1968 | Sweden |
| Mark Warrell | United States Army | United States | 1968 | Sweden |
| Eugene Westbrooks | United States Army | United States | 1968 | Sweden |
| J.W. Wright | United States Air Force | United States | 1968 | Soviet Union |
| William Lee Brent | Black Panther Party activist | United States | 1969 | Cuba |
| Irvin Leon Butler | United States Navy | United States | 1969 | Sweden |
| Lona Cohen | Atomic spy | United States | 1969 | Exchanged to the Soviet Union |
| Morris Cohen | Atomic spy | United States | 1969 | Exchanged to the Soviet Union |
| Jerry Bhagwan Dass | United States Army | United States | 1969 | Sweden |
| Robert Edward Dostlik | United States Marine Corps | United States | 1969 | Cuba |
| Heinz Felfe | Bundesnachrichtendienst | West Germany | 1969 | Exchanged to East Germany |
| Olaf Foertsch | Bundeswehr | West Germany | 1969 | East Germany |
| Ludwig Gummert | Bundeswehr | West Germany | 1969 | East Germany |
| Thomas Kavanaugh | United States Army | United States | 1969 | East Germany |
| Hans-Joachim Kruse | Bundeswehr | West Germany | 1969 | East Germany |
| Robert Kündiger | Bundesmarine | West Germany | 1969 | East Germany |
| John Lowney | United States Marine Corps | United States | 1969 | North Vietnam |
| Vassilios Tsironis | Doctor of Medicine | Greece | 1969 | Albania |
| Jim Walch | United States Army | United States | 1969 | Sweden |
| Zhou Zhende | Republic of China Army | Taiwan | 1969 | China |
| Kimihuro Uomoto | Japanese Red Army | Japan | 1970 | North Korea |
| Kimiko Fukudome | Japanese Red Army | Japan | 1970 | North Korea |
| Kintaro Yoshida | Japanese Red Army | Japan | 1970 | North Korea |
| Moriaki Wakabayashi | Japanese Red Army | Japan | 1970 | North Korea |
| Shirō Akagi | Japanese Red Army | Japan | 1970 | North Korea |
| Takahiro Konishi | Japanese Red Army | Japan | 1970 | North Korea |
| Takamaro Tamiya | Japanese Red Army | Japan | 1970 | North Korea |
| Takeshi Okamoto | Japanese Red Army | Japan | 1970 | North Korea |
| Yasuhiro Shibata | Japanese Red Army | Japan | 1970 | North Korea |
| Alvin Glatkowski | United States Merchant Marine | United States | 1970 | Attempted defection to Cambodia |
| Clyde McKay | United States Merchant Marine | United States | 1970 | Attempted defection to Cambodia |
| Marc Carbonneau | Front de libération du Québec | Canada | 1970 | Cuba |
| Jacques Cossette-Trudel | Front de libération du Québec | Canada | 1970 | Cuba |
| Yves Langlois | Front de libération du Québec | Canada | 1970 | Cuba |
| Larry Humphrey | United States Army | United States | 1970 | Cambodia |
| Mihalis Maniadakis | Royal Hellenic Air Force | Greece | 1970 | Soviet Union |
| Chang Shuang-Chao | Ministry of Finance aide | Taiwan | 1971 | China |
| Sun Chi-Chou | Diplomat | Taiwan | 1971 | China |
| Michael Deberry | United States Army | United States | 1971 | Sweden |
| Tom Horne | Green Beret | United States | c. 1971 | Sweden |
| Ernest Hunter | United States Air Force | United States | c. 1971 | Sweden |
| Hans-Dieter Reinkensmeier | German Army Aviation Corps | West Germany | 1971 | East Germany |
| Harold Hill | Rolls-Royce Limited engineer | United Kingdom | 1971 | Soviet Union |
| Esteban Llana | United States Air Force | United States | 1971 | Panama |
| Jaime Morais | Portuguese Army | Portugal | 1971 | Sweden |
| Bernard Pryer | United States Army | United States | 1971 | Panama |
| John R. Vequist | United States Army | United States | 1971 | Sweden |
| Tobey Wagner | United States Army | United States | 1971 | Panama |
| Kevin Cadwallader | British Army | United Kingdom | 1972 | Sweden |
| Ngo Cong Duc | Journalist | South Vietnam | 1972 | Sweden |
| Pham Van Dinh | Army of the Republic of Vietnam | South Vietnam | 1972 | North Vietnam |
| Sung Wei-Pi | Former diplomat | Taiwan | 1973 | People's Republic of China |
| Gerard Burns | British Army | United Kingdom | 1974 | Ireland |
| Nguyen Thanh Trung | Republic of Vietnam Air Force | South Vietnam | 1975 | North Vietnam |
| Jürgen Schneider | Bundeswehr | West Germany | 1976 | East Germany |
| Bong Ju | Republic of Korea Army | South Korea | 1977 | North Korea |
| William Joseph Black | United States Army | United States | 1977 | Czechoslovakia |
| Yu Un-hak | Republic of Korea Army | South Korea | 1977 | North Korea |
| Robert Thompson | United States Air Force | United States | 1978 | Exchanged to the Soviet Union |
| Erhard Mueller | Bundesmarine aviation wing | West Germany | 1978 | East Germany |
| Li Jun-gwang | Republic of Korea Army military intelligence | South Korea | 1978 | North Korea |
| Roy Chung | United States Army | United States | 1979 | East Germany, then to North Korea |
| Ursel Lorenzen | NATO aide | West Germany | 1979 | East Germany |
| Christel Broszey | Christian Democratic Union aide | West Germany | 1979 | East Germany |
| Inge Goliath | Christian Democratic Union aide | West Germany | 1979 | East Germany |
| Helga Roediger | Federal Ministry of Finance | West Germany | 1979 | East Germany |
| Alexander Lambert | Bureau of State Security | South Africa | 1979 | Sweden |
| Justin Lin | Republic of China Army | Taiwan | 1979 | China |
| Friedrich Tomberg | Pädagogische Hochschule philosophy professor | West Germany | 1979 | East Germany |
| Kim Ryong-jin | Republic of Korea Army | South Korea | 1979 | North Korea |
| Imelda Verrept | NATO aide | Belgium | 1980 | East Germany |
| Günter Guillaume | Aide to the West German Chancellor | West Germany | 1981 | Exchanged to East Germany |
| Frank Terpil | Central Intelligence Agency | United States | 1981 | Libya, then to Cuba |
| Huang Zhicheng | Republic of China Air Force | Taiwan | 1981 | China |
| Ma Bi | Kuomintang adviser | Taiwan | 1981 | China |
| Robert Vesco | Financier | United States | 1982 | Cuba |
| Joseph T. White | United States Army | United States | 1982 | North Korea |
| Gerhard G. | Bundesamt für Verfassungsschutz | West Germany | 1982 | East Germany |
| Gerald Andreas Eckert | South African Army | South Africa | 1983 | Mozambique |
| Li Dawei | Republic of China Air Force | Taiwan | 1983 | China |
| Mun Sang-chol | Republic of Korea Army | South Korea | 1983 | North Korea |
| Alessio Casimirri | Red Brigades | Italy | 1983 | Nicaragua |
| Nam Mccurdy | Writer | United States | 1983 | Nicaragua |
| Assata Shakur | Black Panther Party activist | United States | 1984 | Cuba |
| Xie Yuchen | Film director | Taiwan | 1984 | China |
| Zhang Jinfeng | Film producer | Taiwan | 1984 | China |
| Hans Tiedge | Bundesamt für Verfassungsschutz | West Germany | 1985 | East Germany |
| Jeffrey Carney | United States Air Force | United States | 1985 | East Germany |
| Ra Il-ryong | Republic of Korea Army | South Korea | 1985 | North Korea |
| Edward Lee Howard | Central Intelligence Agency | United States | 1985 | Soviet Union |
| Sonja Luenberg | Aide to the Federal Minister of the Economy Martin Bangemann | West Germany | 1985 | East Germany |
| Herta-Astrid Willner | Aide to the West German Chancellor | West Germany | 1985 | East Germany |
| Herbert Willner | Defence analyst | West Germany | 1985 | East Germany |
| Rudolf Alken | University of Mainz researcher | West Germany | 1985 | East Germany |
| Karl Koecher | Central Intelligence Agency | United States | 1986 | Exchanged to Czechoslovakia |
| Hugo Almeida | United States Army | United States | 1986 | Cuba |
| Glenn Michael Souther | United States Navy | United States | 1986 | Soviet Union |
| Arnold Lockshin | Biochemist | United States | 1986 | Soviet Union |
| Wang Xijue | Airline pilot | Taiwan | 1986 | China |
| Wade E. Roberts | United States Army | United States | 1987 | Soviet Union |
| Stig Bergling | Swedish Security Service | Sweden | 1987 | Soviet Union via Finland |
| Theodore Branch | Radio announcer | United States | 1987 | Soviet Union |
| Choe Deok-sin | Former South Korean diplomat and foreign minister | United States | 1987 | North Korea |
| Song Chang-gu | United States Army aide | South Korea | 1988 | North Korea |
| Lin Xianshun | Republic of China Air Force | Taiwan | 1989 | China |
| Michael Peri | United States Army | United States | 1989 | East Germany |

== Defections after 1991 ==
| Defector | Profession/Prominence | Country of origin | Year of defection | Country of defection |
|---|---|---|---|---|
| Maurizio Gelli | Businessman | Italy | 2009 | Nicaragua |
| Edward Snowden | National Security Agency contractor | United States | 2013 | Russia |
| Choe In-guk | South Korean citizen | South Korea | 2019 | North Korea |
| Evan Neumann | January 6 capitol rioter | United States | 2022 | Belarus |
| Emil Czeczko | Polish Land Forces | Poland | 2021 | Belarus |
| Travis King | United States Army | United States | 2023 | North Korea |
| Tara Reade | Former Congressional aide | United States | 2023 | Russia |
| John David McIntyre | United States Army veteran | United States | 2023 | Russia |
| Wilmer Puello-Mota | Former Holyoke, Massachusetts city councillor and former Massachusetts Air National Guard airman | United States | 2024 | Russia |
| Tomasz Szmydt | Judge | Poland | 2024 | Belarus |
| Jay Fraser | Brewer | United Kingdom | 2024 | Russia |
| Aiden Minnis | British citizen | United Kingdom | 2024 | Russia |
| Ross McElvenny | British citizen | United Kingdom | 2024 | Russia |

== See also ==
- List of Cold War pilot defections
- List of Soviet and Eastern Bloc defectors
- South Korean defectors
