= Patrik Köbele =

German politician

Leader of the German Communist Party
- Incumbent
- Assumed office 2013
- Preceded by: Bettina Jürgensen

Member of the Essen City Council
- In office 2004–2009

Leader of the Socialist German Workers Youth
- In office 1989–1994
- Preceded by: Birgit Radow and Hans-Georg Eberhard
- Succeeded by: Michael Götze

Personal details
- Born: 5 November 1948 (age 76); Weil am Rhein, Allied-occupied Germany
- Political party: German Communist Party (1978–)

Patrik Köbele (born 1962 in Weil am Rhein) is a German politician and leader of the German Communist Party (DKP).

Between 1989 and 1994, Köbele was leader of the Sozialistische Deutsche Arbeiterjugend (SDAJ), the DKP's youth organization. Between 2004 and 2009, he was member of the city council of Essen.

On 2 March 2013, he was elected leader of the DKP. Köbele won with 91 to 60 votes against former leader Bettina Jürgensen. Köbele has stated the Berlin Wall and Inner German Border both were necessary for East Germany's security.

Privately, Köbele lives in Essen with his two children and works as an IT consultant. He has cited former East German leaders Erich Honecker, Willi Stoph, Hilde Benjamin and Erich Mielke as his childhood heroes. He is close friends with former East German leader Egon Krenz.
