= Ernst Frey =

Austrian-Vietnamese soldier (1915–1994)

- Frey in 1938
- Born: 10 June 1915; Vienna, Austria-Hungary
- Died: 13 January 1994 (aged 78); Vienna, Austria
- Military career
- Allegiance: French Foreign Legion (1940–1945); Viet Minh (1945–1951)
- Branch: Army
- Rank: Colonel
- Nicknames: Nguyễn Dân, Hồ Chí Dân
- Commands: 4th Military Region; 9th Military Region
- Conflicts: First Indochina War

Ernst Frey (10 June 1915 – 13 January 1994), also known as Nguyễn Dân and Hồ Chí Dân, (Note: The surname and middle name "Hồ Chí" was inspired by Hồ Chí Minh, the President of North Vietnam.) was an Austrian soldier who served in the French Foreign Legion before defecting to the Vietnam People's Army. Frey commanded the 4th Military Region and 9th Military Region and was among the first colonels of the Vietnam People's Army. During the First Indochina War, he served as an assistant to Võ Nguyên Giáp, the then-Minister of Defense of North Vietnam and then-commander-in-chief of the Vietnam People's Army.

Born in Vienna in 1915, Frey became involved in the Austrian communist movement as a teenager and was imprisoned several times for his political activities. In 1938, he fled Austria and joined the French Foreign Legion, serving in Algeria and later French Indochina. In French Indochina, he established a communist group with some Legion members, in turn joining the Indochinese Communist Party. After the August Revolution in 1945, he took part in the Vietnamese revolutionary movement against the French. In 1951, Frey returned to Austria, where he spent a short time serving in the Catholic Church and the Green Party before his death in 1994.

== Early life ==
Ernst Frey was born on 10 June 1915, in Vienna, Austria-Hungary, into a family of Hungarian Jewish origin. His father was a Jewish social democrat and served in the First World War. In his teenage years, Frey participated in the Socialist High School Youth Association (VSM). In 1934, he joined the Austrian Communist Youth League. Due to his activities in the VSM and accusations of treason, Frey was imprisoned multiple times and banned from attending Austrian universities. He was later released on July 1936 and had a job at Bunzl & Biach.

== Military career ==
In 1938, Austria was annexed by Nazi Germany, and German troops entered Vienna. Frey's mother was captured and publicly tortured. Frey subsequently emigrated and planned to join the International Brigades of the Spanish Republic in the Spanish Civil War. However, he was captured by the SS and spent three months in prison before the German authorities revoked his citizenship. Fleeing to Switzerland, he was also imprisoned for several months. After being released, he escaped to France to continue his way to Spain. In Paris, Frey made a living by selling pencils. After being refused permission to travel to Spain, he remained in France and joined the French Foreign Legion, where he was deployed to Algeria.

In 1940, believing that his opportunity to fight against Nazi Germany had passed, Frey volunteered to serve in French Indochina, hoping that the ship transporting him would be intercepted by the British, giving him an opportunity to fight against Nazi Germany on the British side. Frey was assigned to the 5th Foreign Infantry Regiment. In 1941, the ship arrived in Saigon without being attacked even once, and Frey began organizing a small group of communists in the Foreign Legion in Việt Trì. Dissatisfied with France's cooperation with the Empire of Japan and the Axis powers, the group sought to establish contact with French socialists in Hanoi. They also tried to talk to local people in Việt Trì, but were often unsuccessful. Their goal was to join forces with the local French resistance in order to connect with the Indochinese Communist Party and Viet Minh.

In 1943, an Austrian member of Frey's group established contact with the Socialist Party in Hanoi, which enabled them to engage directly with members of the Communist Party. By the end of 1943, Frey had his first meeting with Túc, an envoy from the Central Executive Committee of the Party. As a result, his communist group chose to apply for membership in the Indochinese Communist Party. After Túc's guidance, Frey received assistance and education from Trường Chinh, the Party's General Secretary (at the time, Trường Chinh was using the codename "Phong"). Supported by Trường Chinh, Frey was accepted into the Indochinese Communist Party on his 29th birthday in 1944. His communist cell was also admitted into the Party later that year.

=== Service in Viet Minh ===
Following the Japanese coup d'état on 9 March 1945, Frey and his comrades were held in an extermination camp, where they suffered from dysentery and malaria. They were then released after the August Revolution's success. Frey was scheduled to meet with Trường Chinh, along with party members Phạm Văn Đồng, Võ Nguyên Giáp, and others. He was first assigned the task to write the French-language propaganda magazine Le Peuple. However, Minister of Defense Võ Nguyên Giáp later appointed him and commander Vương Thừa Vũ to train the National Guard. For the training, Túc acted as Frey's interpreter. Frey also adopted the name Nguyễn Dân in order to conceal his identity.

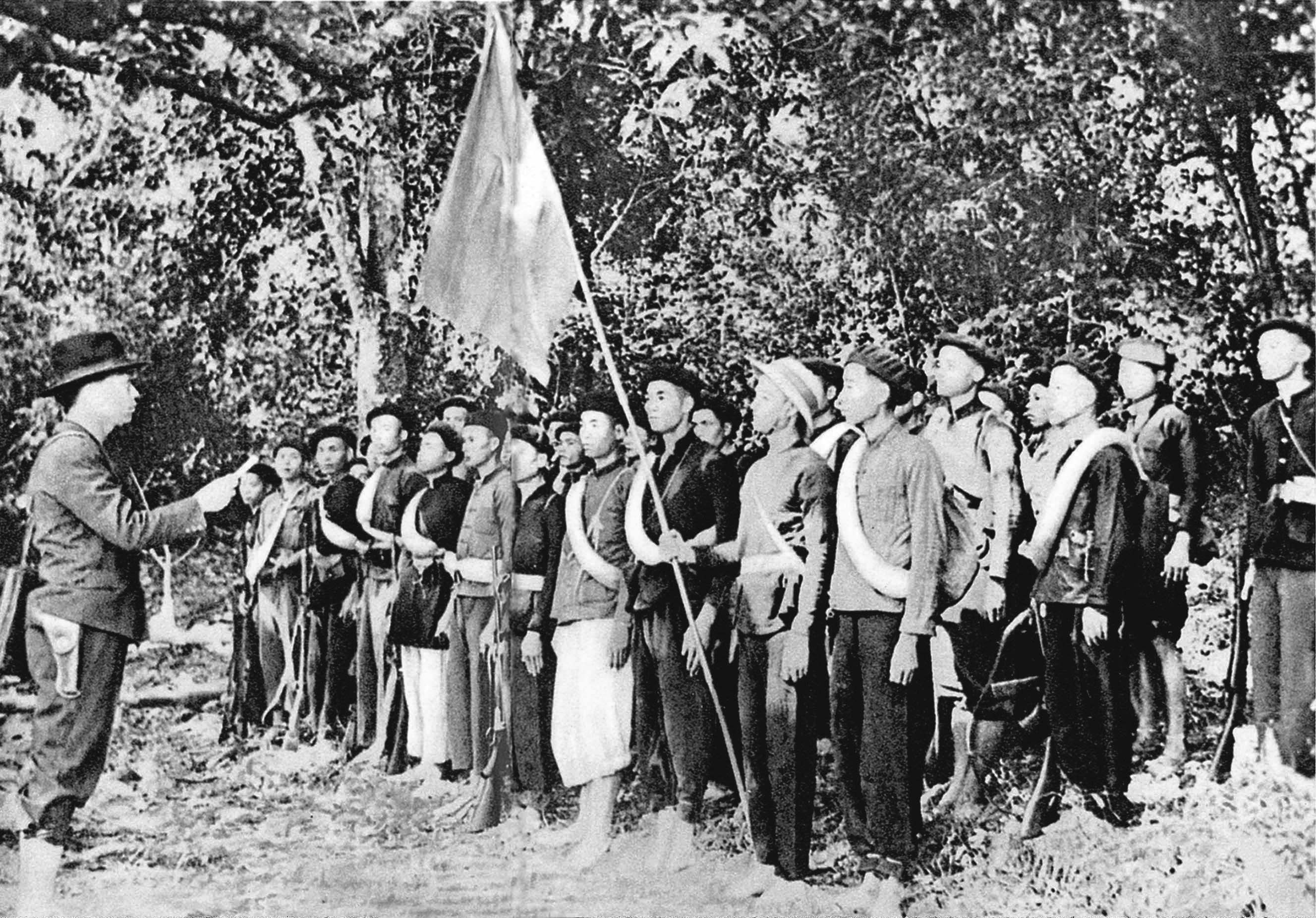
Võ Nguyên Giáp (left) and Viet Minh soldiers (right) in 1944

During the First Indochina War, Frey was responsible for training cadres and assisting a unit in the Capital Regiment to defend the capital city of Hanoi. He was also appointed as an assistant to Giáp, and as the commander of the 9th Military Region, which safeguarded the area of the Central Base. At commander Nguyễn Sơn's proposal, Frey was assigned to be the Deputy Commander of the 4th Military Region and Sơn's assistant. In a battle at An Khê Pass in 1947, Frey led 500 soldiers preventing French forces from advancing into the Central Highlands and won the battle. The victory was praised by Giáp and was considered as his best achievement during his time in the 4th Military Region. It also contributed to his promotion to colonel, making him one of the first colonels in the Vietnam People's Army. In the meeting with the Central Committee, Frey, as a member of the Southern delegation, met the North Vietnamese President Hồ Chí Minh, which increased his prestige with his fellow Party members. At the same time, however, Frey was disturbed to learn that intelligence agents were torturing fellow Party members to uncover conspiracies.

In 1948, Frey returned to being deputy commander of the 4th Military Region. He participated in the defense of the Central Government agencies located in Việt Bắc and commanded an anti-aircraft unit in the Ba Vì mountain range. In the same year, he was incapacitated again by malaria, and started speaking of "a religious awakening".

In February 1951, the 2nd Central Committee of the Workers' Party of Vietnam was held in Tuyên Quang with 158 official delegates in attendance. Among them, Frey was said to be the only foreign official delegate and party member. The Profil interpreted that when Frey stepped up to the podium to address the Party members, he had forgotten his speech and instead appealed to his comrades' consciences, urging them not to glorify the struggle; the magazine also said that was why the Party leadership suddenly granted his request to return to Austria, which he had first made two years earlier. The newspaper of People's Public Security of Vietnam wrote that he left because his mission had ended.

The curriculum vitae which Frey wrote to the Communist Party of Austria in June 1951, instead, contains different information. He wrote that he last attended in the National Conference from January to February 1950. His request to come back his country had already been accepted in August 1949 after just four months, and he had left Vietnam by September 1950. Frey then became a guest at the Chinese Communist Party and made his departure on 16 April 1951. Frey himself wrote in his autobiography that he left Vietnam due to the effect of the Chinese Revolution, which reduced his importance in the country.

Before leaving, President Hồ Chí Minh wrote a letter in French about how regretful he was when he could not meet Frey for the last time. Frey was also given a sketchbook by artist Phạm Văn Đôn from the 304th Division as a souvenir, containing 20 drawings depicting villages, signed by Commander Nguyễn Chí Thanh and Deputy Minister of Defence Tạ Quang Bửu.

== Later life ==
On 25 May 1951, Frey arrived in Bad Vöslau, Austria. Upon returning, he resumed working at Bunzl & Biach. Frey married Franzi Preminger-Auerhahn, who had previously escaped from Austria and gone to England, and they had two daughters born in 1953 and 1955. After converting to Catholicism, he later left the church after he found that he could not fully identify with its direction. He also left the Green Party after disagreeing with one of its decisions.

In 1968, he began writing his autobiography, which took him five years to complete. Even after finishing, he had difficulty finding a publisher willing to publish the book, which was about 1,200 pages long. In 1992, he received a letter from Võ Nguyên Giáp, to which he replied with expressing his affection for Giáp and Vietnam: "All the love I have for Vietnam and its people is, to some extent, focused on you [Giáp] personally, and your sincerity has filled me with immense joy. For me, Vietnam, despite the language barriers, is the homeland I had to leave in 1950. It is also the only country for which I am willing to shed my own blood".

Ernst Frey died of a heart attack on 13 January 1994 at the age of 78. Seven years after his death, in 2001, his autobiography was excerpted and published by scientist Doris Sottopietra, under the French title Vietnam, mon amour (English: Vietnam, my love). In 2014, the Vietnamese translation of the book was released by Trí Thức Publishing House, in collaboration with Thomas Loidl of the Austrian Embassy in Vietnam.

== See also ==
- Stefan Kubiak, also known as Hồ Chí Toán
- Platon Thành
- Kostas Sarantidis, also known as Nguyễn Văn Lập
- List of Western Bloc defectors
