= Unsere Zeit =

German weekly political newspaper

- Type: Weekly newspaper
- Format: Berliner
- Owner: Party executive of the German Communist Party
- Publisher: German Communist Party
- Editor-in-chief: Wera Richter
- Founded: 1969; 57 years ago
- Political alignment: Communism; Marxism–Leninism
- Language: German
- Headquarters: Düsseldorf
- Circulation: 6,000 (June 2012)
- Website: Official website

Unsere Zeit (UZ), (litt. Our Time) is a weekly newspaper published by the German Communist Party. The paper's full name is Unsere Zeit: Sozialistische Wochenzeitung (transl. Our Time: Socialist Weekly Newspaper).

== History and profile ==
Unsere Zeit was established in Düsseldorf in 1969. It is the organ of the German Communist Party.

Its circulation was 60,000 copies in 1975. The weekly paper co-operates with the small German newspaper junge Welt.

In 1989, after funding from the SED was discontinued, daily publication ceased and around forty employees were dismissed. In the late 1980s, the GDR had financed the UZ with around DM 12 million annually. From January 1990, the UZ was published as a weekly newspaper, between summer 1990 and July 1996 on a fortnightly basis and initially with a circulation of 20,000 copies (1990). Since then, the UZ has been available as a 16-page weekly newspaper. The financial situation remains tense and circulation has been falling steadily for years. According to the Federal Office for the Protection of the Constitution, its nationwide circulation is around 7500 copies, while the editorial team spoke of 9000 copies at the UZ press festival in 2005. In June 2012, the newspaper itself reported a circulation of 6,000 copies. In addition to its website, it also maintains a blog and a podcast.

=== Festival ===
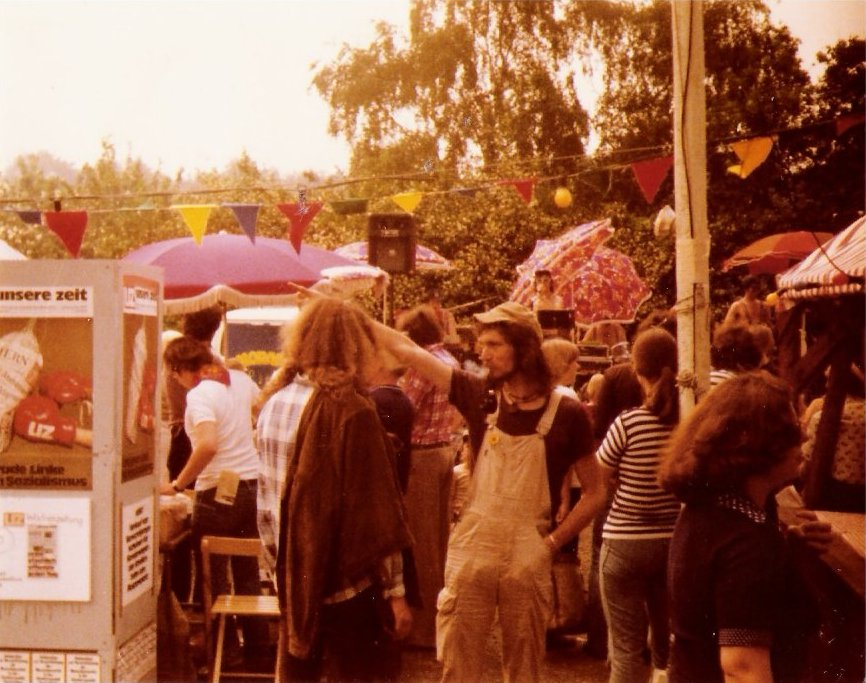
UZ-Pressefest in 1978

The biannual UZ-Pressefest has been the largest festival of the political left in Germany. Since 1973, it has attracted hundreds of thousands of visitors and nationally famous musicians such as Konstantin Wecker and Hannes Wader.
