= German Communist Party =

Far-left political party in Germany

German Communist Party Deutsche Kommunistische Partei
- Abbreviation: DKP
- Leader: Patrik Köbele
- Founded: 25 September 1968; 58 years ago
- Preceded by: Communist Party of Germany
- Headquarters: Hoffnungstraße 18, 45127 Essen
- Newspaper: Unsere Zeit
- Youth wing: Socialist German Workers Youth
- Membership (2021): 2,850
- Ideology: Communism; Marxism–Leninism
- Political position: Far-left
- Regional affiliation: Socialist Unity Party of Germany (1968–1989)
- International affiliation: IMCWP
- Colors: Red
- Bundestag: 0 / 630
- European Parliament: 0 / 96

Website
- dkp.de

The German Communist Party (German: Deutsche Kommunistische Partei, DKP) is a far-left Marxist-Leninist political party in Germany. It was an observer member of the Party of the European Left, before leaving in February 2016. The DKP is monitored by the Federal Office for the Protection of the Constitution (BfV) and is classified as left-wing extremist by the BfV as well as political scientists.

== History ==
The DKP considered itself a reconstitution of the Communist Party of Germany (KPD), which had been banned by the Federal Constitutional Court in 1956 for its aggressively militant opposition to the West German constitution. The new party was formed on 25 September 1968.

The foundation was preceded by talks between former KPD functionaries and Gustav Heinemann, the West German minister of justice, who explained to them that while a refounding of a banned party was not legally possible, Communists were free to form an entirely new party. Even though the close links to the banned KPD made the new party vulnerable to be declared illegal, no such declaration was requested by the German government as West German authorities were liberalizing the attitude towards the communist bloc and East Germany in particular.

The DKP remained on the political fringe, never winning more than 0.3% of the total votes in federal elections. It had relatively greater local support in the 1970s: it achieved up to 2.2% of the vote in Hamburg, 3.1% in Bremen and 2.7% in the Saarland, yet still not enough to enter any Landtags. However, the party enjoyed some success in municipal elections, two patterns of municipalities can be identified in which the DKP was able to win seats: on the one hand working-class residential communities with a long left-wing tradition such as Bottrop in the Ruhr area or Mörfelden-Walldorf in Hesse, and on the other university towns such as Marburg or Tübingen. Following German reunification, the DKP entered a steady decline.

The DKP received national public attention in early 2008 when Christel Wegner, elected to the state parliament of Lower Saxony on the list of the Left Party as the first DKP member of a state parliament, allegedly endorsed the Berlin Wall, the Stasi and other aspects of the East German state in an interview. This caused embarrassment to the national Left Party leadership. Despite denying that she made the controversial statements (at least in the form that was reported), she was expelled from the Left Party faction a few days later.

On 2 and 3 March 2013, the 20th party congress of the DKP took place in Mörfelden-Walldorf (Hesse). The election for the party chairmanship between the incumbent Bettina Jürgensen and her challenger Patrik Köbele came down to a tight contest, after a years-long dispute over direction within the party. Köbele won the election and wanted to position the party as "more militant and revolutionary, re-emphasizing the class struggle, class consciousness and the vanguard role of the Communist Party". "The distance to those forces that prefer reforms within the existing social system to anti-imperialist revolutionary rhetoric without social backing as a short-term goal will increase", Köbele emphasized when he took office.

The DKP ended its observer status in the Party of the European Left on 27 February 2016.

The group around the former chairpersons Bettina Jürgensen, Heinz Stehr and the "architect of the reform course" in the party, Leo Meyer, organized itself in the "Communist Network" and in the association "Marxist Left" (MaLi). MaLi is the official "partner movement" of the European Left Party.

In the course of the internal discussion about the party's orientation in relation to the anti-monopolistic strategy (AMS), some, mainly young members, left the party and the youth organization SDAJ because they rejected the AMS. They initially founded the group "What next?", from which the Communist Organization (KO) emerged in mid-2018 and the Communist Party (KP) emerged in 2024.

== Media ==
The party publishes a weekly newspaper, Unsere Zeit (lit. 'Our Time').

== Election results ==
=== Bundestag ===
Bundestag
Election year	# of total votes	% of overall vote	# of seats
1972	113,891	0.3%	0
1976	118,581	0.3%	0
1980	71,600	0.2%	0
1983	64,986	0.2%	0
1987	—	—	—
1990	—	—	—
1994	—	—	—
1998	—	—	—
2002	—	—	—
2005	—	—	—
2009	1,894	0%	0
2013	—	—	—
2017	11,558	0%	0
2021	15,158	0%	0
2025	—	—	—

=== European Parliament ===
Election	Votes	%	Seats	+/–	EP Group
1979	112,055	0.4 (#6)	0 / 81	New	–
1984	Did not contest		0 / 81	0	–
1989	57,704	0.2 (#10)	0 / 81	0	–
1994	Did not contest		0 / 81	0	–
1999	Did not contest		0 / 81	0	–
2004	37,160	0.14 (#20)	0 / 81	0	–
2009	25,615	0.1 (#28)	0 / 81	0	–
2014	25,204	0.09 (#22)	0 / 81	0	–
2019	20,419	0.05 (#37)	0 / 81	0	–
2024	14,945	0.04 (#33)	0 / 81	0	–

== See also ==
- Communist Party of Germany (1918)
- Communist Party of Germany (1990)
