= Junge Welt =

Left-wing German daily newspaper

- Type: Daily newspaper (Monday to Saturday)
- Format: Berliner
- Owner: LPG junge Welt e. G.
- Publisher: Verlag 8. Mai GmbH
- Editor: Stefan Huth
- Founded: 12 February 1947; 79 years ago
- Political alignment: Marxism
- Language: German
- Headquarters: Berlin
- Circulation: 25,600–27,900 (2017)
- ISSN: 0941-9373
- Website: jungewelt.de

Junge Welt (English: Young World, stylized in its logo as junge Welt) is a German daily newspaper, published in Berlin. The jW describes itself as a left-wing and Marxist newspaper. German authorities categorize it as a far-left medium hostile to the constitutional order.

== History and profile ==
Junge Welt was first published on 12 February 1947 in the Soviet Sector of Berlin. The paper became the official newspaper of the Central Council (Zentralrat) of the Free German Youth (FDJ), the communist youth organisation, on 12 November 1947. With a daily circulation of 1.38 million, Junge Welt had the largest circulation of any daily newspaper in the German Democratic Republic, even higher than the official Socialist Unity Party organ Neues Deutschland.

The paper was published by Verlag Junge Welt GmbH during the East German era. The paper was allegedly sold for a symbolic price of 1 Mark to a West Berlin publishing house in 1991. It was relaunched in 1994, after German reunification and the effective dissolution of the Free German Youth as Germany's most left-wing daily newspaper. The new editorial team included both East and West German authors of different left factions. In 1997, a schism between these two camps led to the eventual foundation of the weekly Jungle World, which since strongly denounced anti-Zionist views upheld by their former colleagues. The newspaper has been criticised by six of its own authors and others for not being sufficiently critical of Mahmoud Ahmadinejad and Iran in relation to their nuclear "ambitions".

Junge Welt is published by Verlag 8. Mai GmbH. The cooperative Linke Presse Verlags-Förderungs und -Beteiligungsgenossenschaft (LPG) junge Welt e.G. began preparing to take over the majority of the publishing house in 1997. The cooperative LPG junge Welt e.G. now owns the majority of Verlag 8. Mai GmbH. According to the Annual Report of the Federal Office for the Protection of the Constitution, "the national daily newspaper Junge Welt is the most important printed medium in the left-wing extremist scene" in Germany. Junge Welt had an estimated print run of around 25,600–27,900 in 2017. Junge Welt unsuccessfully filed a lawsuit against being named in the report on the protection of the constitution and lost in court in March 2022.

Arnold Schölzel, who was editor-in-chief of the newspaper from 2000 to 2016, was a Stasi informant until 1989.

== See also ==
- Unsere Zeit
- Media cooperative
