= Glenn Michael Souther =

Soviet spy (1957–1989)

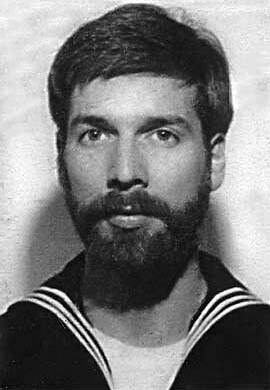
- Souther while serving with the U.S. Navy
- Born: Glenn Michael Souther; January 30, 1957; Hammond, Indiana, United States
- Died: June 22, 1989 (aged 32) Moscow, Soviet Union
- Cause of death: Suicide
- Buried: Kuntsevo Cemetery, Moscow, Russia
- Allegiance: United States (1979–1986); Soviet Union (1986–1989)
- Branch: United States Navy (1976–1982; 1982–1986 (reservist)); KGB (1986–1989)
- Rank: Major
- Awards: Order of Friendship

Glenn Michael Souther (January 30, 1957 – June 22, 1989), also known as Mikhail Yevgenyevich Orlov, was an American sailor who became a Soviet intelligence officer after defecting to the Eastern Bloc in 1986.

Souther had spied for the Soviet Union in the U.S. Navy from 1980 and transmitted important classified information to the Soviet secret services. Souther defected to the Soviet Union in 1986 after being investigated for espionage, gave up his U.S. citizenship, and was granted Soviet citizenship from the Presidium of the Supreme Soviet. Souther settled in Moscow, promoted to the rank of major in the KGB, and later awarded the Order of Friendship. Souther committed suicide three years after his defection, at age 32.

== Biography ==
=== Early life ===
Glenn Michael Souther was born on January 30, 1957, in Hammond, Indiana, the son of an entrepreneur. Souther's parents divorced when he was four years-old and he was brought up by his mother. In 1975, Souther graduated from high school in Cumberland, Maine, and briefly attended university before enlisting in the United States Navy where he was trained as a photographer. Souther served on the USS Nimitz from July 1976 to November 1978, and was stationed with the United States Sixth Fleet in Italy from April 1979 to 1982, where he married an Italian woman.

=== Espionage ===
In 1980, while stationed in Italy, Souther attempted to defect to the Soviet Union at the Soviet embassy in Rome, stating he did not seek political asylum and did not declare any persecution by the American authorities. Souther's request was rejected by Soviet KGB general Boris Aleksandrovich Solomatin, the embassy's resident KGB attaché who had coincidentally recruited and handled the American spy John Anthony Walker. Instead, Solomatin recruited Souther to spy on the U.S. Navy for the Soviet Union in exchange for the potential to earn Soviet citizenship, as Souther's job allowed him access to sensitive information that was highly valuable to the Soviets. According to Solomatin, Souther was an ideological spy and not motivated by money.

In 1982, Souther was given an honorable discharge from the U.S. Navy with a rank of petty officer first class to study Russian literature and commissioned officer training at Old Dominion University. Simultaneously, Souther worked as a reservist at the Atlantic Fleet intelligence center in Norfolk, Virginia, where he was assigned to a laboratory processing satellite-reconnaissance photos, and also may have been privy to sensitive communications intercepts. Souther was one of the Soviets' most effective spies and provided them with highly-important classified information, including secret photographs of weapons, plans for the movement of fleet ships, their weapons, and their tasks, and the criteria by which the US command assessed the admissibility of a nuclear strike.

In 1981, Souther's ex-wife had approached one of his superior officers to report that she saw evidence of his espionage. The report was filed and considered to be motivated by a scorned woman attempting to cause trouble for her husband. When John Anthony Walker was arrested in 1985, the report was flagged and now taken more seriously. Thereafter, Souther was interrogated by the FBI but was not charged due to a lack of evidence.

=== Defection ===
In May 1986, Souther requested Soviet citizenship, aware that the investigation against him was progressing. In June, fearing imminent arrest, Souther defected to the Soviet Union by flying from the United States to Rome, where the Soviet intelligence services transferred him to Moscow. Initially, Soviet counterintelligence units were suspicious of Souther's defection and feared that he was a double agent for the CIA, but he was cleared shortly afterwards. On October 2, 1986, Souther was granted Soviet citizenship in a decree from the Presidium of the Supreme Soviet, and adopted the Russian name Mikhail Yevgenyevich Orlov. Souther was well received by the Soviet authorities, gifting him an apartment in Moscow and a dacha on the outskirts of the city, and promoting him to the rank of major in the KGB – one of few foreign spies to be commissioned as an officer in the agency. Souther became actively engaged in scientific activities, developed his own English teaching program, walked around Moscow a lot, and traveled to other Soviet cities. Souther met and befriended other foreign Soviet intelligence agents that had defected including Kim Philby and George Blake. Souther married a Russian woman named Elena, an English teacher at the Intelligence Institute, and they had a daughter named Alexandra. In early 1988, Souther was awarded the Order of Friendship of Peoples for his contributions in the intelligence services following a petition from the KGB leadership.

Souther did not publicly resurface until July 20, 1988, when a television interview program with a segment about him was broadcast on Soviet Central Television. In the program, Souther spoke about his own disillusionment with American nuclear policies and his love for the works of Russian poet Vladimir Mayakovsky. He also discussed and criticized several American intelligence operations in which he took part, including the 1986 bombing of Libya and the analysis of the Chernobyl disaster. On July 11, one week before the television interview, Izvestia published an article about Souther, announcing that he received Soviet citizenship, that he defected for ideological reasons, and that he was visited by relatives from the United States who were convinced that he did indeed move to the Soviet Union voluntarily. The Izvestia article was the first new information about Souther in the United States since defecting in 1986, and Souther's fate had previously been unknown to his relatives. In mid-1988, in another interview, Souther made several statements praising his new living conditions in the Soviet Union and optimistic about the country's future. In reality, Souther was impressed by the Soviet Union's free education and health care, well-developed public transport, and the social security system, but found much of the country had failed to live up to his expectations. In August 1988, Souther wrote a diary entry about perestroika, the restructuring of the Soviet political and economic system occurring at the time, where he was highly skeptical and pessimistic of the reforms.

== Death ==
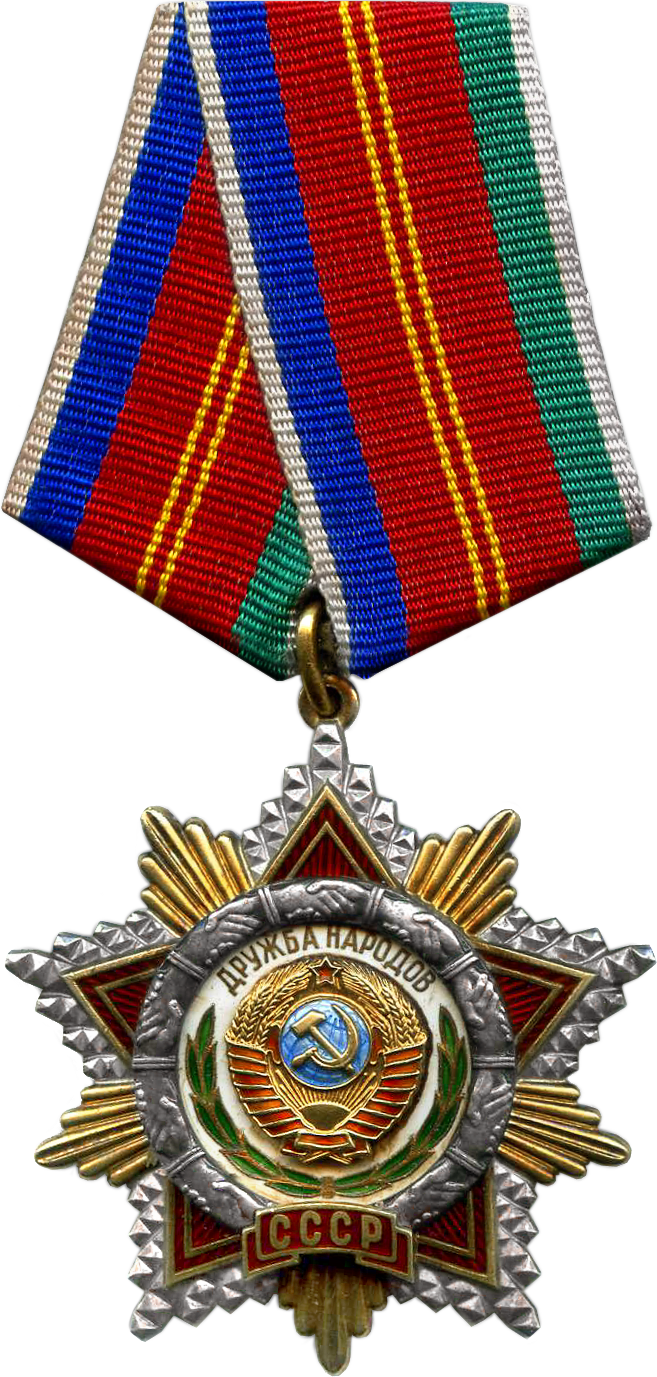
Souther was honored with the Order of Friendship of Peoples.

On June 22, 1989, Souther reportedly committed suicide in Moscow at the age of 32, only three years after his defection. Souther died from asphyxiation caused by carbon monoxide poisoning by sealing himself inside his garage and starting his car. Soviet newspapers suggested he had been depressed from severe homesickness. His death was announced by the Red Star newspaper, and he was eulogized by KGB chairman Vladimir Kryuchkov, who considered him to be a very important agent. Souther was buried in Kuntsevo Cemetery in Moscow.

Souther's suicide note contained the following text:

I don't have any regrets about our relations. They were the long ones, they helped me to establish myself as an individual. Everyone was tolerant, and fair towards me. I hope that you, as it was always, forgive me the unwillingness to engage the last battle.

original text (in Russian): Я ни в коей мере не сожалею о наших отношениях. Они были продолжительными и помогли мне вырасти как личности. Все были терпимы и добры ко мне. Надеюсь, вы, как это было всегда, простите меня за то, что я не захотел пойти в последний бой.

Despite some expressions which make it clear that it has been written by a foreigner, such as "as it was always", which is unusual for native Russian-speakers, who use the shortened form "as always", the note itself has been written in coherent, literary Russian.

In his earlier 1988 notes, Souther stated that Russia was his Dreamland, the land which astonished him, despite the loneliness he suffered living far from his birthplace.
