= People's Army Newspaper =

Vietnamese newspaper

Quân đội nhân dân
- Type: Daily newspaper
- Format: Broadsheet
- Owner(s): Central Military Commission of the Communist Party of Vietnam
- Founded: October 20, 1950; 74 years ago
- Language: Tiếng Việt, English, Chinese, Laos, Cambodian
- Headquarters: 7 Phan Đình Phùng Street, Ba Đình Ward, Hà Nội
- Country: Vietnam
- Website: www.qdnd.vn (vi-VN) en.qdnd.vn (en-US)

The People's Army Newspaper (Vietnamese: Báo Quân đội nhân dân) is a Vietnamese newspaper headquartered in Hanoi. It is under the authority of the Central Military Commission of the Communist Party of Vietnam and the Ministry of National Defense, and it is practically the official press of the entire Vietnam People's Armed Forces and the People's Army of Vietnam. It is published in Vietnamese, English, Chinese, Lao and Khmer languages.

It was established as a revolutionary newspaper with the name Vệ quốc quân (lit. 'the National Guard') during the First Indochina War and later changed its name to Quân đội nhân dân (lit. 'the People's Army'). Polish soldier Stefan Kubiak, who had deserted from the French Foreign Legion and joined the Việt Minh, became a reporter of The People's Army after the First Indochina War.
