= Stefan Kubiak =

Polish-Vietnamese soldier (1923–1963)

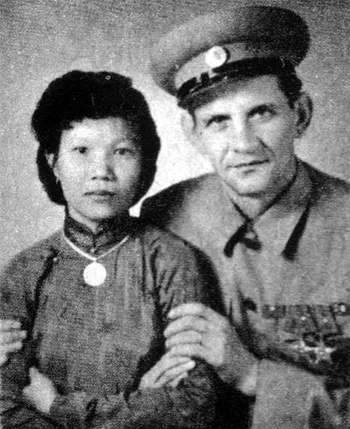
- Nguyễn Thị Phượng and Stefan Kubiak sometime between 1956 and 1963
- Born: 25 August 1923; Łódź, Second Polish Republic
- Died: 28 November 1963 (aged 40); Hanoi, Democratic Republic of Vietnam
- Cause of death: Malaria and wounds
- Burial place: Văn Điển cemetery, Vietnam
- Spouse: Nguyễn Thị Phượng (died in 2007)
- Children: 2 sons: Hồ Chí Thắng (born in 1956) and Hồ Chí Dũng (born in 1958)
- Military career
- Allegiance: Soviet partisans; Polish People's Army; French Foreign Legion; Việt Minh; People's Army of Vietnam
- Service years: 1944–1945 (Soviet partisans); 1945–1946 (Polish People's Army); 1946–1947 (French Foreign Legion); 1947–1963 (People's Army of Vietnam)
- Rank: Captain (Đại úy)
- Nickname: Hồ Chí Toán
- Conflicts: First Indochina War; Battle of Điện Biên Phủ; Vietnam War
- Awards: Gold Star Order; Order of Ho Chi Minh (3rd Class)

Stefan Kubiak (25 August 1923 – 28 November 1963), also known as Hồ Chí Toán, was a Polish soldier who became a decorated captain in the People's Army of Vietnam. A Soviet partisan near the end of World War II, Kubiak was eventually drafted into the French Foreign Legion and sent to fight against the Vietnamese in French Indochina, but he deserted and switched sides.

Taking part in the First Indochina War and later the Vietnam War, Kubiak proved a valuable strategist and tactician – particularly during the Battle of Điện Biên Phủ. He was awarded Vietnam's highest honours for his feats during the conflict. He settled in Hanoi and started a family there, before succumbing to his wartime wounds and malaria seven years later.

== Biography ==
=== Childhood ===
On 25 August 1923, Stefan Kubiak was born into a poor family of weavers in the Widzew district of Łódź, in the Second Polish Republic. As a child, he enjoyed reading adventure and historical books, as well as watching films, which distracted him from the poverty of his childhood and caused him to develop an interest in exotic lands.

=== World War II ===
During the Second World War, due to the German occupation of Poland, the sixteen-year-old Stefan was deported as a forced labourer to the Third Reich. First he worked on a farm near Memel (now Klaipėda in Lithuania), where the German landowner forced him to do the labour of two people. Then he was sent to a factory in Westphalia, where he experienced starvation.

Upon hearing of the Red Army advancing towards Poland, he escaped his workplace and rode across Nazi Germany as a stowaway on trains. He was discovered and sent once more to the outskirts of Memel, where he was forced to dig trenches. He escaped again, breaking through to the southeast, and joined a unit of Soviet partisans.

In early January 1945, twenty-one-year-old Kubiak returned to Łódź with the Red Army. Following the advice of a veteran friend, he joined the Central School of Political Officers. He was set to become a politruk of the Polish People's Army, the armed forces of Stalinist Poland (later the Polish People's Republic), but then he deserted in unclear circumstances.

=== French Foreign Legion ===
Mixing in with the German expellees, Kubiak found his way to Allied-occupied Germany. While there – penniless, hungry, and with no documents – he was arrested by the French gendarmerie. He was forced to choose between prison and service in the French Foreign Legion. Kubiak chose the latter and was sent, via the port of Marseille, to do intense training in Algeria. After finishing his training there, now as a soldier of the French Foreign Legion, Kubiak took part in suppressing anti-colonial riots in French Morocco in 1946.

In December of the same year, he boarded the SS Pasteur ship to fight in the First Indochina War. At the beginning of 1947, his unit was stationed in Nam Định to combat Vietnamese insurgency in the region using search and destroy operations. After witnessing methods of interrogation and torture used by the French forces against Vietnamese peasants, which often resulted in murders and rapes of the civilian population, Kubiak believed he was fighting on the wrong side and decided to desert. He conspired with two Germans and an Austrian in the Legion who felt the same way, and together they devised an escape plan that led them into the forest.

=== Viet Minh and the PAVN ===
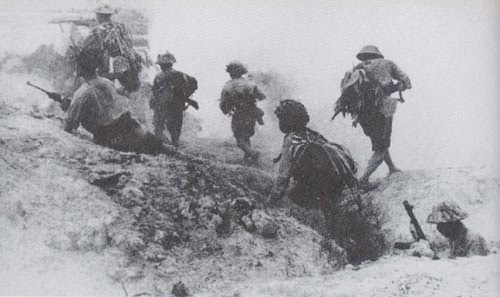
Việt Minh soldiers launching an assault during the Battle of Điện Biên Phủ.

With the goal of joining the Việt Minh's fight for Vietnamese independence against the French, the European deserters initially experienced difficulties in getting any of the locals to trust them due to their appearance and French uniforms. Eventually, they succeeded when they were led to the fighters by a Vietnamese villager boy. The right-hand man of the local insurgent leader turned out to be a German deserter from the Legion, which eased the newcomers' transition; within two weeks, they were assigned to partisan subdivisions.

Kubiak started his duty in the Việt Minh with the audacious task of dispersing propaganda flyers in Nam Định, the city in which he had previously been stationed with the Legion. He then joined the National Guard as a volunteer and took part in several ambushes on French military convoys and patrols. Finally, he began training young Vietnamese insurgents in the use of modern firearms. For his role in the fighting at Phu Tong, he earned his first Vietnamese decoration. During his time in North Vietnam, Kubiak showed his knack for fixing various kinds of captured weaponry (including cannons, grenade launchers, and mortars). His skills were utilised after the Battle of Hòa Bình in the spring of 1952, when the Việt Minh had captured cannons that they were unable to use. Kubiak was able to fix the problem, allowing the Vietnamese forces to use the ordnance and earning himself the recognition of his superiors.

Over the next few years, he took part in all the main battles of the war. While fighting for the Fu Tong post, he almost died after being hit in the face by a grenade; despite bleeding profusely from his injured head, with the last of his strength he managed to throw off the deadly charge, which then exploded in the enemy bunker. He was almost captured by the French when covering the retreat of his encircled comrades in Sơn Tây. Within the People's Army of Vietnam, he earned the nickname Toán ("Mathematician") for the exceptional skills in tactics and strategy that he demonstrated during the Điện Biên Phủ campaign. General Võ Nguyên Giáp had given Kubiak command over an artillery unit. He was considered a talented soldier, helping to break through the most difficult enemy blockade in the Battle of Điện Biên Phủ by disguising himself as a French officer, which ultimately made it possible for the Vietnamese troops to charge and finally capture the bunker. For this action, he was promoted to the rank of captain and received another military decoration.

Despite being foreign, Kubiak grew to be very respected by the Việt Minh, and was even granted the honorary family and middle name of "Hồ Chí", which he accepted personally from Hồ Chí Minh, the first President of the Democratic Republic of Vietnam, who adopted him and granted him his name for Kubiak's contribution in the struggle for Vietnam's national liberation.

=== Final years ===
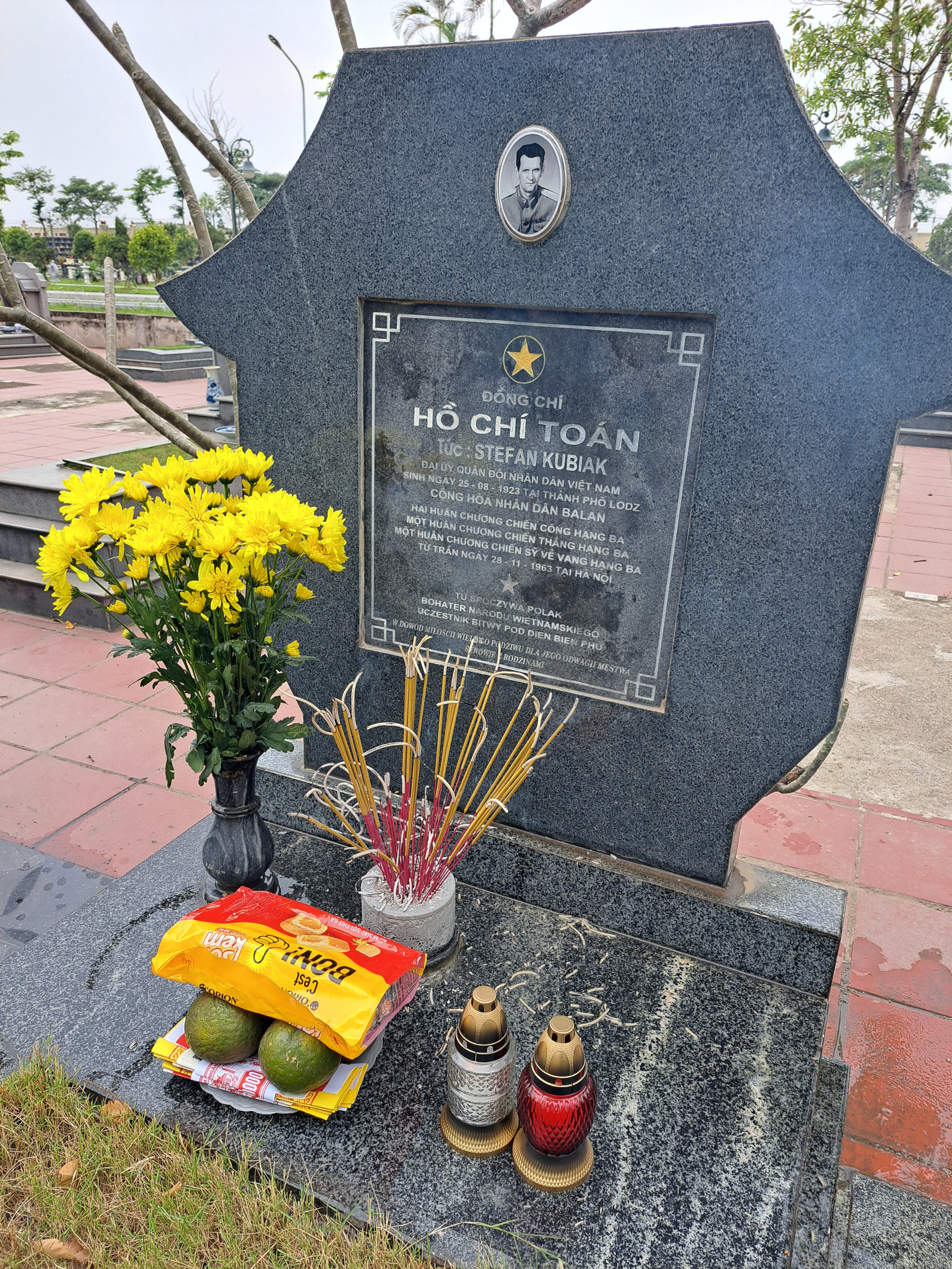
Kubiak's grave at the Văn Điển cemetery near Hanoi.

After the end of the First Indochina War in 1954, Kubiak was transferred to Hà Nội – the capital city of Vietnam – and continued to work in the military, but now as a reporter for the People's Army Newspaper.

Kubiak sometimes flew to the Polish People's Republic, pardoned for his earlier desertion and now serving as translator of Vietnamese military delegations. He settled in Hanoi and, in 1956, started a family with a Vietnamese woman called Nguyễn Thị Phượng who was also Catholic; they met thanks to Franciszek Zwierzyński, who was stationed in Vietnam as part of Poland's involvement in the International Control Commission. Kubiak married Phượng and together they had two sons: Hồ Chí Thắng (born in 1956) and Hồ Chí Dũng (born in 1958). Due to recurring wounds sustained in combat and severe malaria, Stefan Kubiak fell gravely ill in 1963 and died in Hanoi, on 28 November of that year. He was 40 years of age.

Accordingly with Kubiak's last wishes, his wife and children – known in Polish as Teresa Kubiak with her sons Stefan Jr. and Wiktor – migrated from Vietnam to the PRL to live in Łódź in 1964. Kubiak's grave is located at the Văn Điển cemetery, 11 kilometres from Hanoi city centre; in addition to the Vietnamese inscription, his tombstone reads in Polish: Tu spoczywa Polak, bohater narodu wietnamskiego, uczestnik bitwy pod Dien Bien Phu ("Here lies a Pole, hero of the Vietnamese nation, participant of the Battle of Điện Biên Phủ").

As of 2015, Stefan Kubiak Jr. lived near Warsaw, the capital of Poland.

== See also ==
- Platon Nguyễn Văn Thành
