= Wilmer Puello-Mota =

American fugitive

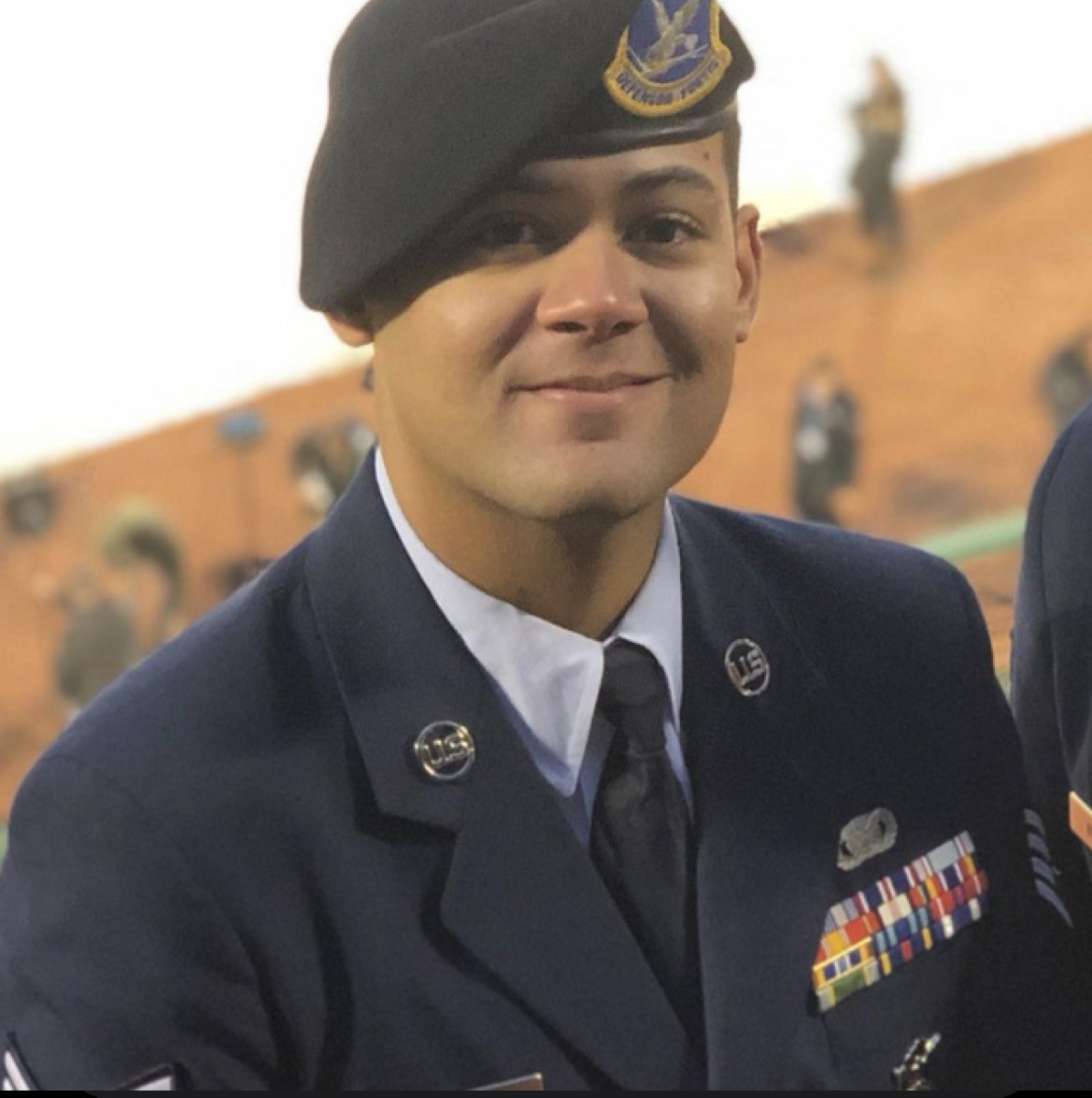
- Wilmer Puello-Mota in U.S. Air Force uniform
- Born: December 3, 1995 (age 30)
- Education: Community College of the Air Force (Associate's degree, 2018); University of Massachusetts Amherst (Incomplete, no degree awarded)
- Military career
- Allegiance: United States (2013–2022); Russia (2024–present)
- Branch: United States Air Force (2013–2022); Russian Ground Forces (2024–present); Unmanned Systems Forces (2025–present)
- Units: 66th Air Base Group (2013–2019); 455th Air Expeditionary Wing (2015); 379th Air Expeditionary Wing (2018); 104th Fighter Wing (2019–2022); Pyatnashka Brigade (2024); 41st Guards Combined Arms Army (2024–present)
- Conflicts: War in Afghanistan: Russo–Ukrainian War; Eastern Front; Battle of Avdiivka; Battle of Chasiv Yar; Pokrovsk offensive; Battle of Kostiantynivka

Wilmer Puello-Mota (born December 3, 1995) is a former Holyoke, Massachusetts city councilor, United States Air Force veteran, and current fugitive from justice who fled from the United States to Russia on 8 January 2024. The flight occurred three days after the conclusion of his city council term and two days before he was expected to plead guilty in court to charges of possession of child pornography, obstruction of justice, and forgery-counterfeiting charges in Rhode Island. Puello-Mota joined the Russian military in 2024 and has since fought for Russia against Ukraine. Puello-Mota's attorney has stated that Puello-Mota likely fled because he "didn’t want to register as a sex offender."

The Russian government has described Puello-Mota as an "American with Russian citizenship" and a "former American citizen." Puello-Mota has asserted he still a U.S. citizen and is not a "traitor."

== Military career ==
=== United States Air Force ===
Puello-Mota enlisted into the United States Air Force (USAF) at 17, requiring a parental consent waiver, and served for six years. He deployed to Afghanistan in 2015 with the 455th Air Expeditionary Wing to support operations against the Taliban. While serving in Afghanistan at age 19, as the youngest airman present, he participated in the traditional Air Force birthday cake-cutting ceremony on September 18, 2015, at Bagram Airfield alongside the oldest serving airman, Brig. Gen. David Julazadeh (455th AEW commander), and Chief Master Sgt. Matthew Grengs (455th AEW command chief).

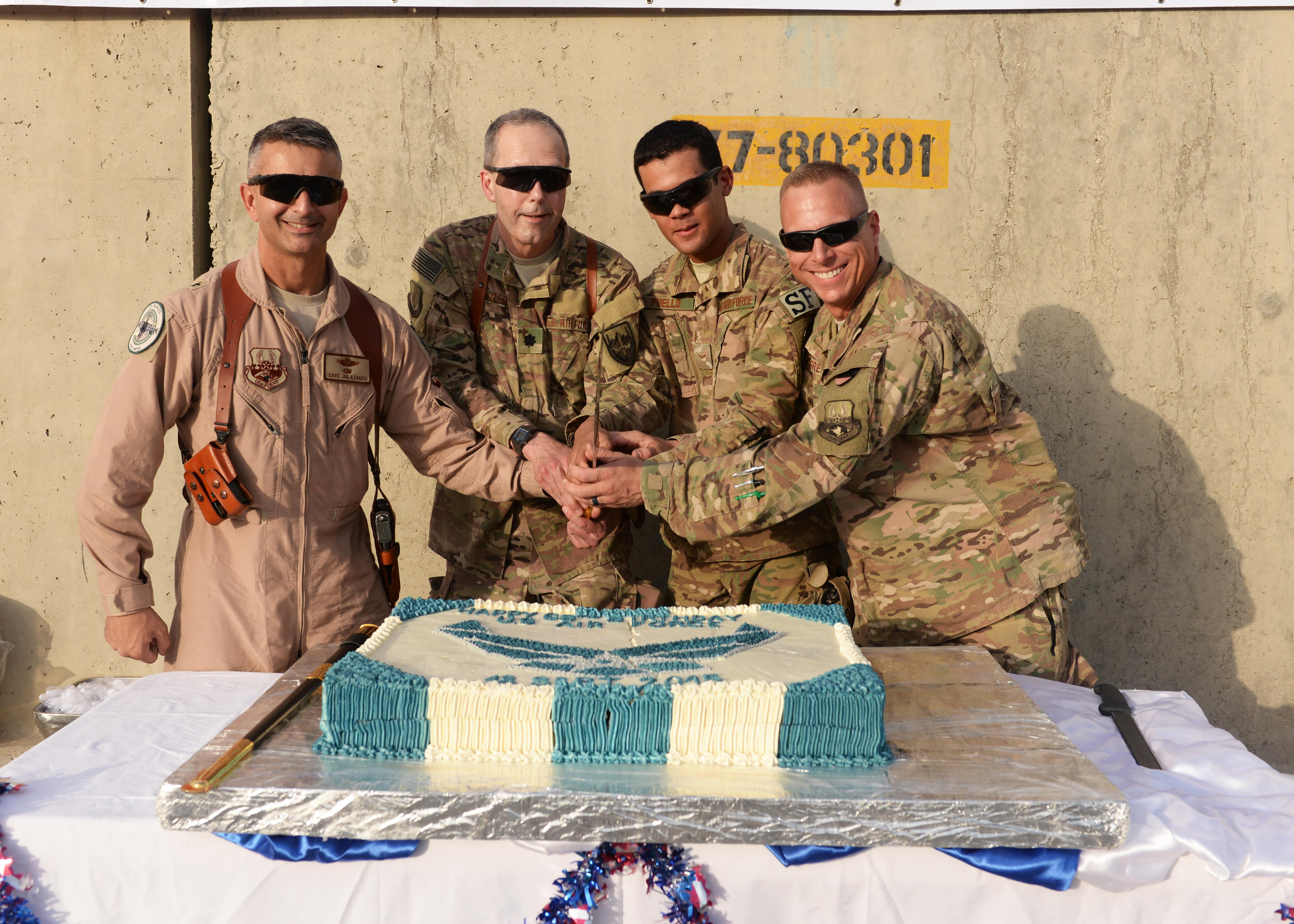
Puello-Mota participating in the Air Force birthday cake-cutting ceremony at Bagram Airfield, Afghanistan, September 18, 2015

During the deployment, Puello-Mota served as a member of the 455th Expeditionary Security Forces Squadron's Fly Away Security Team (FAST). The FAST airmen flew missions on C-130J Super Hercules aircraft across Afghanistan, providing security for the aircraft, crew, passengers, and airfields. He worked alongside Senior Airman Nathan Sartain of the 66th Security Forces Squadron. On October 2, 2015, Sartain and Airman 1st Class Kcey Ruiz were among six Airmen killed when their C-130J Super Hercules crashed shortly after takeoff from Jalalabad Airfield, Afghanistan.

Later in 2018, Puello-Mota spoke in support of renaming two gates at Hanscom Air Force Base in honor of his fallen comrades. At the October 2, 2018 ceremony, he stated of Sartain, “He wasn’t just phenomenal on the job, but off the job, too. He was a fantastic human being.” The Hartwell Gate was renamed the Senior Airman Kcey Ruiz Gate and the Vandenberg Gate was renamed the Senior Airman Nathan Sartain Gate. Puello-Mota departed Hanscom in 2019.

During his time at Hanscom Air Force Base, Puello-Mota earned an associate's degree in criminal justice through the Community College of the Air Force.

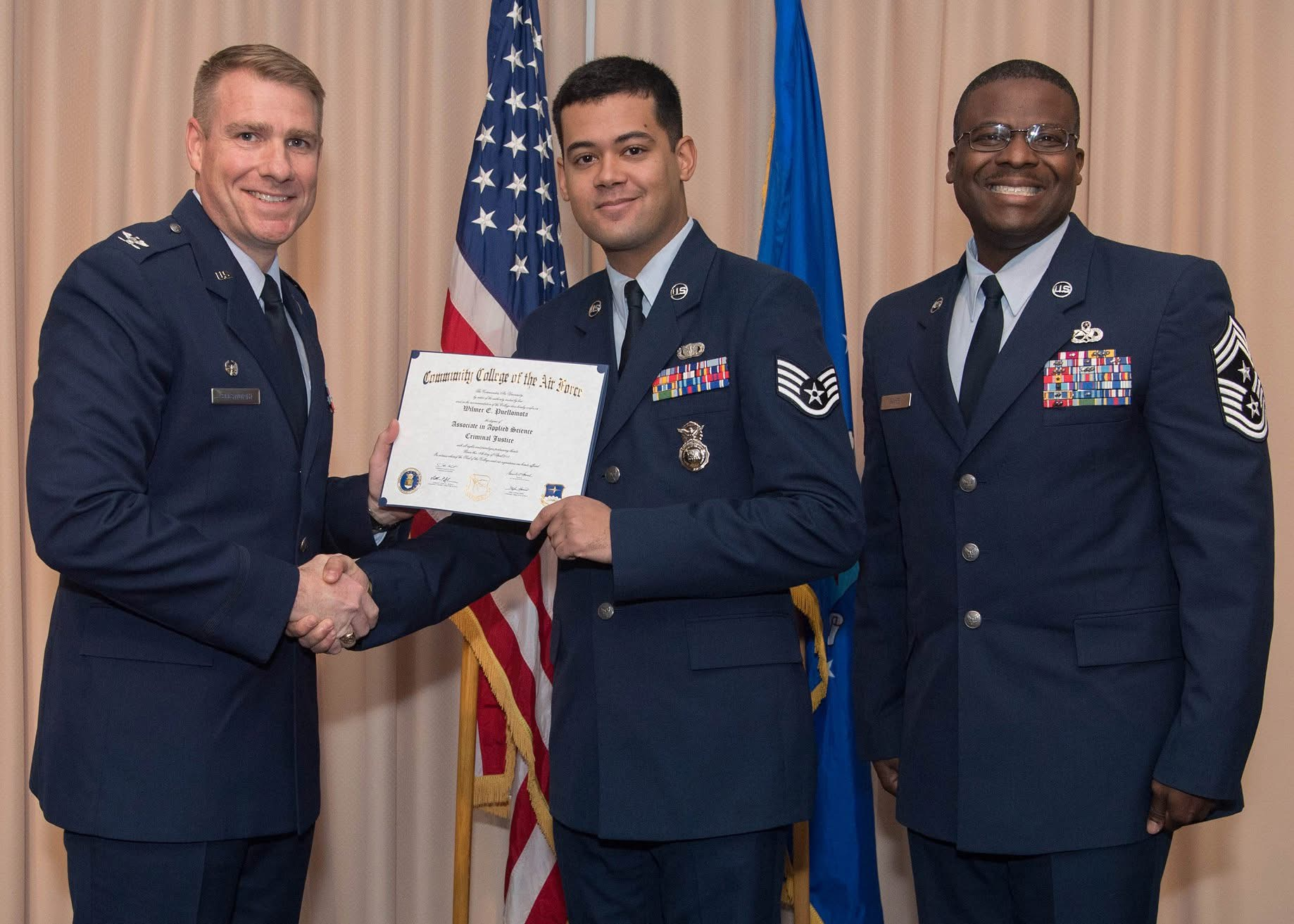
Puello-Mota receiving his Community College of the Air Force degree at Hanscom Air Force Base in 2018

=== Massachusetts Air National Guard ===
Puello-Mota joined the Massachusetts Air National Guard in June 2019 as a member of the 104th Fighter Wing's Security Forces Squadron, rising to the rank of technical sergeant. In total, Puello-Mota served nearly ten years in the U.S. military (active duty Air Force and Massachusetts Air National Guard) before his service was terminated in October 2022.

== Political career ==
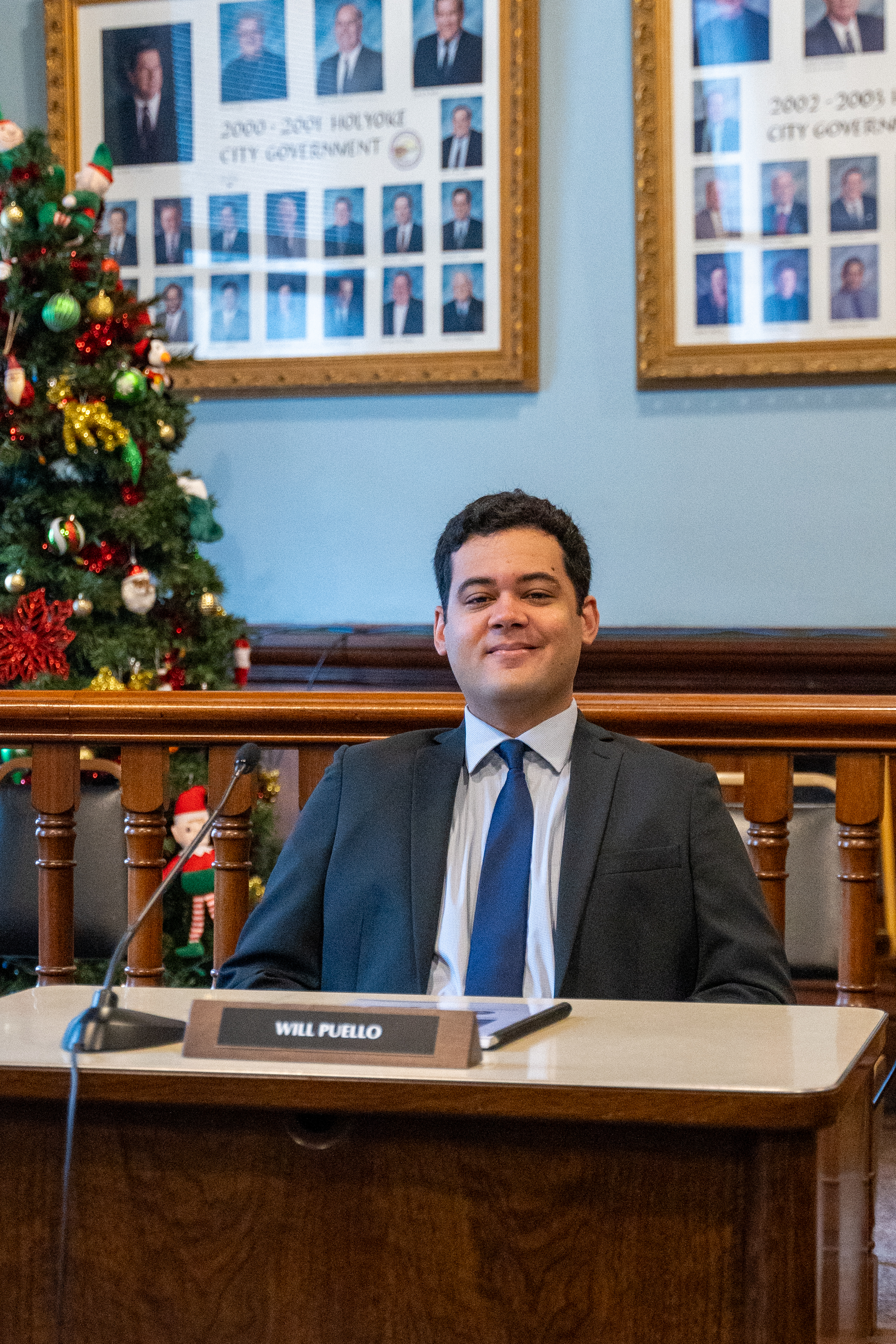
Puello-Mota as a Holyoke city councilor

Puello-Mota served as a member of the Holyoke City Council in Holyoke, Massachusetts from 2022 to 2024, representing Ward 2. He won the 2021 election unopposed at approximately age 26 and was one of the youngest candidates in the race.

Despite facing criminal charges beginning in 2022 in Rhode Island that led to his arrest, detention, and absence from council duties, Puello-Mota continued to serve until his January 2024 flight to Russia.

In September 2022, the city's law department declared his seat vacant under "section 46" of the Holyoke city charter while he faced pending charges. Puello-Mota sued the city to retain his seat. A Hampden Superior Court judge ruled in his favor, issuing an injunction that the city could not remove him without a conviction. He returned to the council shortly afterward.

On 8 January 2024, Puello-Mota fled the United States due to pending criminal charges which he was expected to plead guilty to after he was bailed out of jail for USD$20,000. Puello-Mota's city councilor term ended three days prior, on 5 January 2024.

On 10 October 2025, Puello-Mota attempted to vote in a Holyoke city election while in Russia. His ballot was placed-under legal review and later denied after the city clerk determined that he did not qualify, as he failed to properly indicate he was living overseas, provide an address outside the country, or specify a preferred ballot delivery method.

== Criminal charges ==
In 2022, Puello-Mota was charged with possession of child pornography, obstruction of justice, and forgery, all by the state of Rhode Island. The child pornography charge stems from a 2020 incident where law enforcement located child sexual abuse material (CSAM) on Puello-Mota's phone while investigating him for a larceny allegation. Law enforcement alleged that the CSAM contained within Puello-Mota's phone featured images and videos of a child; when interviewed, the minor alleged that Puello-Mota was her "sugar daddy".

Once charged, prosecutors further alleged Puello-Mota had someone pose as his commander at the 104th Fighter Wing of the Massachusetts Air National Guard (MAANG) for a telephone call with the prosecution team handling Puello-Mota's case. Prosecutors also alleged that Puello-Mota forged a document from his MAANG chain-of-command which stated he was "fully-qualified" to continue his duties with the MAANG. The allegations led to the forgery-counterfeiting charge.

Puello-Mota was initially released on his own recognizance, before violating his bail conditions. Puello-Mota was sentenced to be held in a Rhode Island jail for 90 days before meeting the new $20,000 bail requirement.

Court records also indicate that Puello-Mota attempted to enter into a pre-trial diversion program but was denied. Puello-Mota is also alleged to have attempted to leverage their military service into facilitating a more favorable plea deal, which was also denied.

In June 2023, Puello-Mota declined to accept a plea-deal offered by the prosecution; Puello-Mota would have been sentenced to five years in prison, with a mandatory term of two years before being eligible for parole. After declining the offer, Puello-Mota's trial was set to begin in July 2023.

Puello-Mira's trial was delayed into January 2024 when he indicated that he would plead guilty. In January 2024, Puello-Mota fled to Russia and informed his attorney that he had "joined the Russian Army". His attorney further stated, "I’m sure he joined the Russian army because he didn’t want to register as a sex offender." Puello-Mota has since been a fugitive from justice.

== Fugitive from justice and service in Russia ==
On January 7, 2024, Puello-Mota left the United States by going to Dulles International Airport bound for Istanbul, Turkey, to enter Russia. In April 2024, videos were shown from pro-Kremlin news sources on Telegram showing Puello-Mota enlisting for the Russian army at an enlistment center in Khanty-Mansiysk of western Siberia with the caption "An American signed a military contract at the patriots centre in Khanty-Mansiysk".

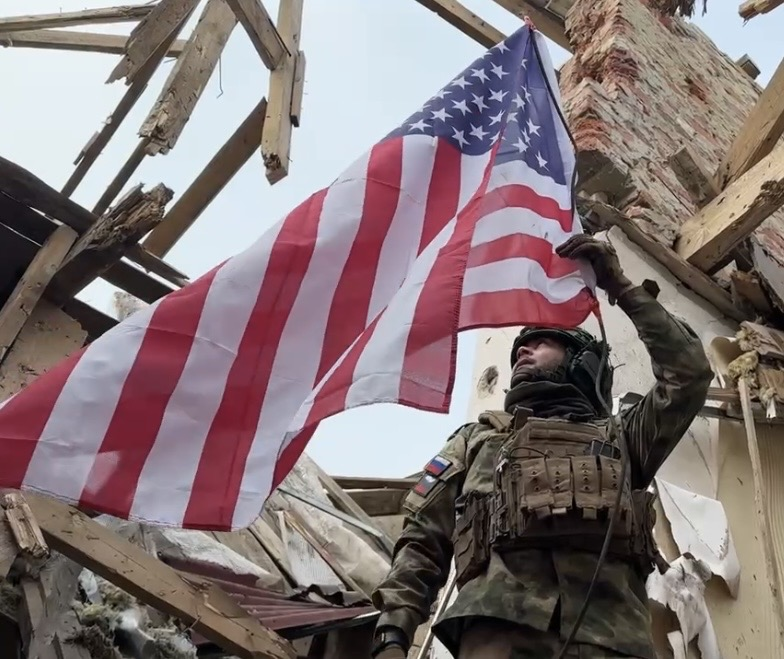
Puello placing the U.S. flag in a building after the Battle of Avdiivka while serving with the Pyatnashka Brigade (Russia)

In a separate video from the battles there, he was shown planting a U.S. flag in the ruins of Avdiivka.

In another video released in August 2024, Puello-Mota denounced United States support for Ukraine and actions against Russia while stating that he does not believe he's a "traitor" to the United States.
