= Arnold Schölzel =

German journalist (born 1947)

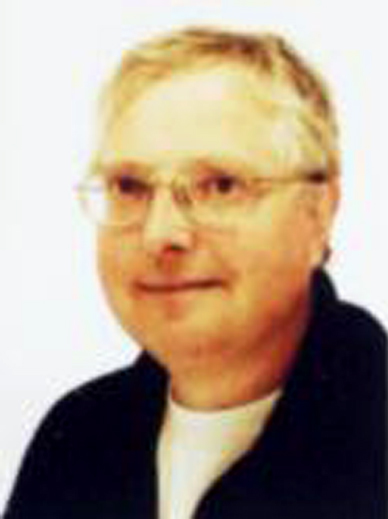
Arnold Schölzel

Arnold Angelus Schölzel (born 21 October 1947) is a German editor and former defector, currently the editor-in-chief of the newspaper Junge Welt. Prior to 1989, Schölzel worked at Humboldt University in East Berlin, and also was an informant for the East German domestic intelligence agency, the Stasi.

== Background ==
Arnold Angelus Schölzel was born on 21 October 1947, and grew up in Bremen, West Germany, and at age 16 became a member of the Social Democratic Party of Germany, the largest moderate left-wing political party in Germany.

== Defection ==
On 13 August 1967, the anniversary of construction beginning of the Berlin Wall five years earlier, Schölzel decided to desert from the West German Army, and then defected to communist East Germany. Schölzel worked as a laborer in Leipzig until he began studying philosophy at Humboldt University in East Berlin in 1970, earning his diploma in 1974 and a doctorate in 1982, later becoming employed as a research assistant at the university.

=== Stasi informant ===
Schölzel was recruited by the East German government under the Socialist Unity Party (SED) as an informant for the country's domestic intelligence agency, the Stasi, receiving the code name "André Holzer". At Humboldt University, Schölzel infiltrated opposition groups where he reported on the activities of numerous individuals, including Wolfgang Templin. Stefan Wolle of the Research Network on the Communist State (Forschungsverbund SED-Staat) at the Free University of Berlin described Schölzel as an informant who "...with real enthusiasm and great perfidiousness, he went behind the backs of the people with whom he was friends." He maintained being an informant for the Stasi until 1989, shortly before East Germany was dissolved the following year.

== Post-reunification activity ==
After the Reunification of Germany, Schölzel was suspended from his job at Humboldt University in 1991 and dishonourably discharged in 1994, due to his activities as an informant for the Stasi. Schölzel's informant activities were the subject of a documentary film, Verraten – sechs Freunde und ein Spitzel, broadcast by ARD in 2007. In the film, Arnold Schölzel acknowledged having been an informant for the Stasi, and when asked by film-maker Inga Wolfram why he had betrayed his friends, he replied: "Well, you betrayed 17 million people", referring to the population of East Germany.

In 1997, Schölzel became the feuilleton editor of Junge Welt, the largest far-left newspaper in Germany, and in February 2000 he became editor-in-chief. The newspaper is under observation by the Bundesamt für Verfassungsschutz, who categorized it as left-wing extremist, and was described by the conservative German newspaper Die Welt as being dominated by former members of the Stasi.
