= Glen Roy Rohrer =

Glen Roy Rohrer, photo from his identification card, mid 1960's

Glen Roy Rohrer (December 8, 1920 in Springfield, Illinois, USA - May 12, 2003 in Prague; aged 82) was a United States Army Sergeant First Class, who in August 1965 defected into communist Czechoslovakia and was subsequently employed by Czechoslovak secret police (StB). In later years he was also used for propaganda by the communist regime.

In the autobiograhical book Nahá sfinga (Naked Sphinx, 1976), prepared under the guidance of StB, he was presented as an "American military intelligence officer" - while in fact he was a polygraph examiner. Since 1982 in retirement. Died in May 2003, his ashes were scattered on Malvazinky cemetery in Prague, all without the notification of his family.

Before his 1965 defection, Rohrer had been stationed as a polygraph operator at Camp King, Oberursel, Germany, which was a joint Army/CIA/ONI/BND facility used for debriefing East Bloc defectors. He assisted in defector interrogations as a polygraph operator.

== Literature ==
- Petr Cajthaml: BELL aneb Příběh zrádce, in Securitas Imperii 13, 2006, ISBN 978-80-86621-22-7, p. 5-36, 122-149. (BELL, or the Story of a Traitor, study in Czech language with English summary, available online in PDF format.)
