= Ursel Lorenzen =

West German NATO secretary who defected to East Germany in 1979

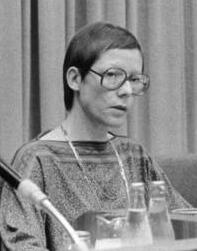
Lorenzen at a press conference in 1980

Ursel Lorenzen (married name Sturm) was formerly a West German NATO secretary who defected to East Germany in 1979.

After working as a NATO aide for 12 years, where she last worked as a secretary to the British Director for NATO operations, Lorenzen, along with her lover at the time (Dieter Will, the manager of the Brussels Airport Hilton), disappeared. She appeared soon afterward on an East German propaganda broadcasting, and eventually compromised NATO war plans. At the time, Lorenzen's defection was considered to be NATO's greatest espionage case. She eventually married Dieter Will, and they took the name "Sturm". They lived in East Germany until September 1990, when German reunification was imminent. Aware of West German warrants for their arrest, they fled the country. Charges against Lorenzen were dropped in 1999.

As of December 1999, Lorenzen was believed to be living in Libya.
