= Brian Patchett =

Brian Patchett (born 1941) was a British corporal of the Intelligence Corps who defected to East Germany in July 1963.

Patchett was an intercept operator at RAF Gatow in West Berlin, and as a consequence he had a comprehensive knowledge of the deployment of British signals units in West Germany. Patchett took part in propaganda broadcasts following his defection, in which he condemned British espionage.
