= Socialist German Workers Youth =

Political youth organization

Socialist German Workers Youth Sozialistische Deutsche Arbeiterjugend
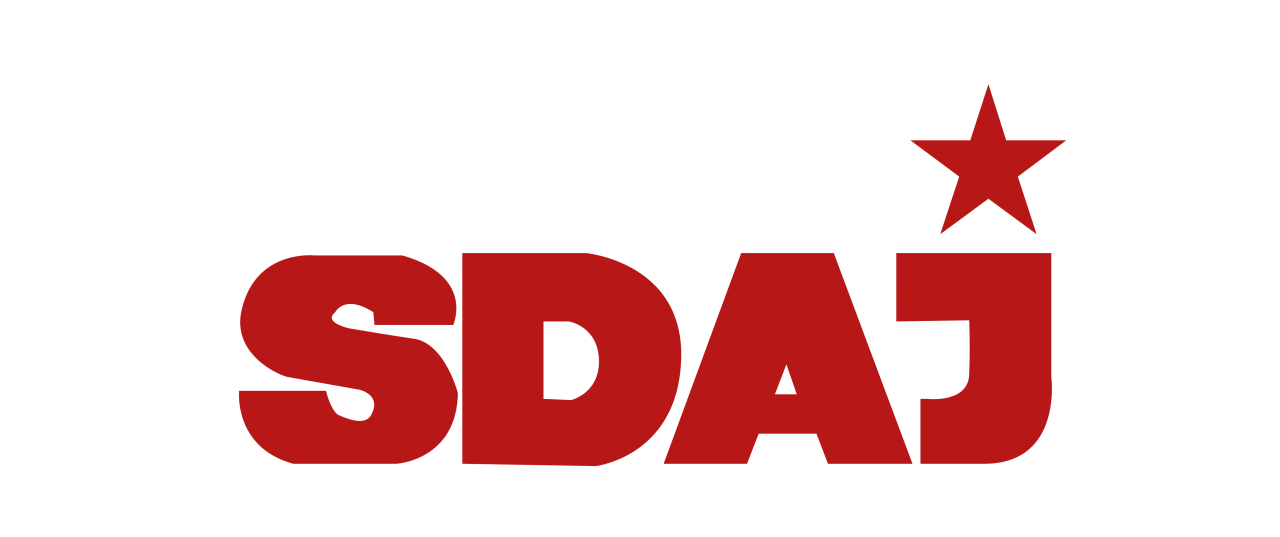
- Chairperson: Andrea Hornung
- Founded: 5 May 1968; 58 years ago
- Headquarters: Hoffnungstraße 18 Hope Road 18, D-45127 Essen
- Membership: 1200
- Ideology: Communism; Marxism–Leninism
- Mother party: German Communist Party
- International affiliation: WFDY; MECYO
- Website: sdaj.org

Socialist German Workers Youth (German: Sozialistische Deutsche Arbeiterjugend, abbreviated SDAJ) is a political youth organization in Germany. It is a Marxist–Leninist organization and related to the Deutsche Kommunistische Partei (German Communist Party). SDAJ is a member of World Federation of Democratic Youth.

== Goals ==
The SDAJ describes itself as an independet organisation of students, apprentices, young workers and university students living in Germany, regardless of their origin or nationality.

The organisation advocates a society free from exploitation and racism, in which power rests with the people rather than corporations and business leaders. It identifies socialism as the alternative for which it campaigns.

According to the SDAJ, achieving this alternative requires more than reforms to existing conditions; it considers a break with the capitalist system necessary to establish a socialist society. The organisation therefore describes itself as anti-capitalist and revolutionary.

== Structure ==
Individuals between the age of 14 to 30 are eliable to become members of the SDAJ. The SDAJ is divided into local chapters, district chapters and state chapters. The group is represented in all 16 German states. According to the 2026 report of the Federal Office for the protection of the Constitution the SDAJ is formally independet organisation but considers itself the youth organisation of the German Communist Party.

Federal Chairperson of the SDAJ
| Period | Name |
|---|---|
| 1968-1974 | Rolf Priemer and Walter Möbius (Deputy) |
| 1974-1979 | Wolfgang Gehrcke and Dieter Gautier (Deputy) |
| 1979-1982 | Werner Stürmann and Hans Kluthe (Deputy) |
| 1982-1989 | Birgit Radow and Hans-Georg Eberhard (Deputy) |
| 1989-1994 | Patrick Köbele |
| 1994-2000 | Michael Götze |
| 2000-2004 | Tim Sanders and Jürgen Wagner |
| 2004-2006 | Collective Leadership |
| 2006-2008 | Michael Grüß |
| 2008-2013 | Björn Schmidt |
| 2013-2016 | Paul Rodermund |
| 2016-2018 | Jan Meier |
| 2018-2021 | Lena Kreymann |
| since 2021 | Andrea Hornung |

SDAJ groups in Germany in April 2021

== History ==
=== 1968–1977 ===
The SDAJ was founded on May 5, 1968, the 150th anniversary of Karl Marx 's birth, by young members of the banned KPD – even before the DKP was reconstituted on September 25, 1968. Reinhard Junge was among the co-founders.

The suppression of the Prague Spring by Warsaw Pact troops on August 21, 1968, in Czechoslovakia was welcomed by the SDAJ. In the years that followed, the organization remained silent about the repression faced by hundreds of thousands of supporters of the Prague Spring, including employment bans and other forms of political persecution.

The SDAJ sought to participate in the new social movements that emerged in the wake of the 1968 student movement. At the same time, large numbers of apprentices had become politically active, campaigning for improvements in the quality of vocational training and their living and working conditions. The SDAJ emerged in the context of the growing apprentice movement and became one of its major political actors.

Following the founding of the German Communist Party in 1968, the SDAJ cooperated closely with the party while formally maintaining its organizational independence as a youth organization. During the 1970s, it became one of the largest left-wing youth organizations in West Germany and was active in a range of political campaigns, including protests against public transport fare increases, known as the "Red Dot" campaigns . According to its own figures, the organization had at times more than 35,000 members.

=== 1978–1987 ===
From 1978 to 1988, the SDAJ organized the Festival of Youth biannually together with the Marxist Student Association Spartacus (MSB). The Festival was held mid-May on the grounds of the Dortmund exhibition. Internationally known artists attended. For example, the 1978 festival included figures such as Jutta Weinhold, Snowball, Udo Lindenberg, Puhdys and the Titi Winterstein Quintet. Political debates were a common feature. According to the SDAJ, more than 100,000 visitors attended.

The SDAJ maintained close institutional relations with the FDJ. The two organizations regularly renewed their friendship agreement, exchanged delegations and provided mutual support. The FDJ also offered material assistance, including access to holiday camps. The SDAJ was additionally supported financially by the DKP, which itself received substantial financial assistance from the GDR.

In the 1980s, the SDAJ played a major role in the West German peace movement.

=== 1988–1997 ===
In 1988, conflicts emerged in SDAJ and DKP as reformist tendencies gained strength. At the SDAJ Federal Congress of 1989 the organization split, as the majority of the delegates voted for a proposal that would keep the SDAJ as a Marxist working class youth organization. The defeated faction grouped around then national chairman Birgit Radow and left the Congress. The Radow group failed to create a nationwide organization. Many former leading members switched to the youth structures of the PDS.

The fall of the GDR and the reunification of Germany, produced a crisis in SDAJ and DKP. Funding from GDR was discontinued and employees were laid off. Until about 1993, the SDAJ remained virtually without functioning central coordination. In 1994 the reorganization and reactivation of district and local associations began. As of the late 1990s local groups stabilized and new groups established in areas including Leipzig, Dresden, Gera, Potsdam, Rostock, Gadebusch and Berlin.

=== 1998–present ===
Due to the slight increase in membership, the bi-annual Festival of Youth was refounded in 2008 in Jugendpark of Cologne.

In October 2011, the SDAJ held its 20th national congress of Hanover, Lower Saxony.
