= Platon Nguyễn Văn Thành =

Soviet soldier

Platon Nguyễn Văn Thành (1922–2003), born Platon Aleksandrovich Skrzhinsky (Russian: Платон Александрович Скржинский) and also known as Thành Nga (Thành the Russian) or Hai Thành, was a Russian soldier who fought for the communist-led Viet Minh during the First Indochina War. He served in Viet Minh's well-known 307th Battalion, which was active in Southern Vietnam.

Platon Thành returned to Hanoi and then the Soviet Union after the 1954 Geneva Accords. He worked at the Vietnamese Department of Radio Moscow and maintained contacts with his Vietnamese friends, with notable figures of North Vietnam and unified Vietnam. He once visited Vietnam in 1988 together with old comrades of the 307th Battalion. Platon died in Moscow at the age of 80.

== Early life ==
Platon Aleksandrovich Skrzhinsky was born on 28 March 1922 in Zhytomyr Oblast, Ukraine. Platon's father, Aleksandr Stanislavovich Skrzhinsky, was a Polish nobleman and a graduate of the Historical and Philological Institute of Prince Bezborodko in Nizhyn, who was certified to teach Latin and Ancient Greek. Platon's mother, Anna Alekseevna Skrzhinskaya, was a Russo-Ukrainian noblewoman who had been living in Paris and attending Sorbonne University. Anna was also a proficient piano player. Aleksandr and Anna named their son Platon after the Greek philosopher Plato. Thanks to his family's assistance and influence, Platon managed to read many works of well-known writers. He also became fluent in Russian, French, German, Polish, and Ukrainian.

== Service in the Red Army and prisoner of war ==
Platon finished high school in 1940 at the age of 18 and was drafted into the Red Army. Nazi Germany invaded the Soviet Union the next year, and Platon, as a soldier, took part in the Great Patriotic War against Germany. Platon was reported to have been wounded several times but chose to keep fighting in the frontline rather than undergo medical recuperation. He served in Rostov-on-Don, then in Astrakhan, and was sent to the Donbas to participate in the 1942 Second Battle of Kharkov. The battle ended in disaster for the Soviets and Platon was amongst the prisoners of war. He was imprisoned in Częstochowa (Poland). In prison he was forced to perform menial labour, military truck maintenance, and sometimes act as a translator due to his multilingual capability. Like many other Soviet POWs, Platon suffered from severe mistreatment and malnourishment, resulting in trauma that affected his mental health till the end of his life. During the imprisonment, Platon joined a secret anti-Nazi organization associated with the Polish Home Army. Amongst the members was an anti-war German military officer. In 1944, as the organization's identity was leaked, a German officer arranged its members, including Platon, to be relocated to another prison facility in Denmark. It is also said that USSR's rapid advance to the Polish border contributed to the reason for the relocation.

After Germany was defeated in 1945, Platon and Soviet POWs were allowed to return to their homeland. However, due to Platon's good relationship with a French-speaking German warden, he was suspected of being a German spy. Moreover, under the influence of alcohol, Platon had a heated argument with an NKVD sergeant about roles and activities of Soviet POWs during the war. Afraid of misunderstanding and punishment from Soviet authorities, Platon fled from the prisoner camp. He first arrived in Hamburg and worked for a German busisnessman. Dissatisfied with the employer's attitudes towards poor people, Platon took part in smuggling goods out of the warehouse. The employer soon discovered this and sacked him. Platon then moved to Bavaria and worked in a kitchen for the U.S. military, but did not stay long due to conflicts with American personnel, whose attitudes Platon considered as "mockery" and "cynical". He then was employed by a plantation owner in southern France; this job was also short-lived as the employer became unsure about Platon's identity. The French employer nonetheless gave Platon some compensation money and advised him to join the French Foreign Legion, which was recruiting soldiers. Platon accepted the offer to satisfy both his survival needs and his own dream of travelling aboard.

== From a French legionnaire to a member of Viet Minh's 307th battalion ==
As a French legionnaire, Platon and others were sent to southern Vietnam to suppress the resistance war of the Viet Minh against French invasion. He first arrived at Saigon, then was garrisoned at Vĩnh Long and Bến Tre. Platon was assigned as a truck driver and did not directly participate in combat against the Viet Minh. However, Platon still witnessed the war crimes and brutality of the French army against the Vietnamese people. And then Platon discovered the pictures of communist leaders Lenin, Stalin, and Mao Zedong amongst the looted personal belongings of Viet Minh soldiers. He decided to join the Viet Minh and assist their effort against the French. He first secretly smuggled weapons to the Vietnamese partisans and, together with the Vietnamese, planned an escape from the French camp. However, the plan was exposed due to a traitor and Platon narrowly escaped being convicted as his Vietnamese comrades refused to reveal Platon's identity to the French authorities. Platon later smuggled food and rations to the Vietnamese prisoners of war, assisted them in their menial labor, and openly told them about his past as a Soviet POW. Platon's kindness to the Vietnamese attracted the attention of a Viet Minh underground agent, and after several tests of loyalty, the agent helped Platon to escape the French military camp on 17 August 1947.

Platon quickly adapted to his new life as a Viet Minh partisan, and took a Vietnamese name, Nguyễn Văn Thành, shortened as Hai Thành or Thành Nga. Platon learned to speak Vietnamese, wore Vietnamese clothes, adopted Vietnamese ways, and developed an affinity for local Vietnamese cuisine, including the smelly mắm. He actively assisted the Vietnamese in their daily labour. The local Vietnamese had a good relationship with Platon; they even gave him more favour and affection due to sympathy with his unfortunate fate. Being physically strong, Platon usually carried the wounded from the battlefield, and having a Western appearance enabled him to disguise himself as French officers to lure the French into Vietnamese surprise attacks. After a year, Platon's disguise was exposed and he was transferred to Viet Minh's 99th Battalion in Bến Tre, and then joined the famous 307th Battalion, serving as a company deputy commander, and being entrusted with a 60mm mortar, the "blessed" weapon of his unit. He was praised for his bravery and commitment in combat. In 1952, Platon joined the Vietnam Communist Party.

== After 1954 ==
After the 1954 Geneva Accords, many Viet Minh cadres and their families, including Platon and his daughter Anna, were relocated to the northern half of the country which was under the control of the socialist Democratic Republic of Vietnam (DRV). Fluent in both Vietnamese and Russian, Platon worked as a translator on the Soviet ship Stavropol which was to transport them northwards. He later moved to Thanh Hoá with his old wartime comrades, and after ending military service, lived with Anna in Hanoi. For his meritorious military service, Platon was awarded the Order of Glorious Soldier. In Hanoi, Platon and Anna attended an audience hosted by President Hồ Chí Minh and were invited to the presidential palace as guests. Moved by Platon's contribution during the war, president Hồ wrote a letter to the Soviet Union asking for Platon's rehabilitation. Thanks to president Hồ's personal appeal, together with strong support from the DRV authorities, the Soviet government reinstated Platon's citizenship and allowed his repatriation. However, Platon was neither recognized as a war veteran nor as an international soldier as Soviet citizens at that time made no allowance for international duties.

Platon and Anna returned to the USSR by train on 10 May 1955, and visited Red Square in June. They traveled to Berdichev to meet Platon's parents only to find out Anna Alekseevna died long ago and Aleksandr Stanislavovich was killed by the Germans in 1942. Unemployed and homeless, Platon sent Anna Platonovna to a relative, while he rented a house in Moscow and worked as a truck driver in the Soviet capital. Thanks to a recommendation of an old friend, Platon was hired by the Vietnamese language department of the Foreign Radio Broadcasting of Moscow – which was in dire need of Vietnamese speakers – and he worked there for 25 years. He was amongst the very few Russian broadcasters who had a proper Southern Vietnamese accent. Platon personally liked his job as it enabled him to broadcast his anti-war messages and express his love for Vietnam and his Vietnamese relatives. He also loved to speak Vietnamese and demanded that Vietnamese guests converse with him using their mother tongue. He was a co-editor of the 1957 Russian – Vietnamese Dictionary under the name of P.A. Skrzhinsky. He became a translator after retirement, mostly focused on French literature and some works of Vietnamese writers, and also acted as advisor for Soviet and Russian researchers about Vietnam-related themes. Platon also kept in touch with his Vietnamese associates, frequently worked and met with Vietnamese government and state delegations, trade union leaders, writers' unions, composers, playwrights, and artists, and contributed to the works of Soviet/Russia – Vietnam Friendship Association. He and Anna visited Bến Tre, Vietnam, for a reunion of the surviving members of 307th Battalion in 1988.

Platon Nguyễn Văn Thành died on 26 March 2003 in Moscow, a few days before his 81st birthday. His funeral was attended by the representative of the Vietnam Embassy in Moscow and other Vietnamese associates.

== Family ==
Platon Thành married a French-Vietnamese woman named Nguyễn Thị Mai (Collete Mai) in 1948, thanks to the recommendation and arrangement of their Vietnamese associates. They had a daughter, born on 28 August 1949, named Anna Platonovna Skrzhinsky in Russian and Nguyễn Hồng Minh in Vietnamese. She was usually called "Janine" by her family and Platon's friends. Due to wartime circumstances, Collete relocated to Bến Tre city. She remarried a Chinese man and had two more children. Collete's remariage upset both Platon and Collete's mother, but Platon respected his wife's decision. Janine lived with Platon after 1954 and she followed in her father's footsteps with working in the Vietnamese department of Radio Moscow.

== See also ==
- Stefan Kubiak
