= Kenneth Myers =

Kenneth or Ken Myers may refer to:

- Ken Myers (rower), American rower
- Kenneth A. Myers III, director of the Defense Threat Reduction Agency
- Ken Myers (surgeon) (1935–2021), Australian surgeon
- Ken Myers (politician) (1933–2007), American politician in Florida
- Kenny Myers, executive at Mercury Records
- Ken Myers, radio broadcaster and audio journal host, see Mars Hill Audio

== See also ==
- Kenneth Myers Centre, a landmark building in Auckland, New Zealand
- Kenneth J. Meyer (born 1959), American politician from Tennessee
- Ken Myer (1921–1992), American-born Australian philanthropist
