= Defense Threat Reduction Agency =

U.S. Combat Support Agency for countering WMD

Coordinates: 38.717°N 77.162°W

- Seal

Agency overview
- Formed: 1 October 1998
- Preceding agencies: Defense Special Weapons Agency, (1996–1998); Defense Nuclear Agency, (1971–1996); Defense Atomic Support Agency, (1959–1971); Armed Forces Special Weapons Project, (1947–1959); Manhattan Project (1942–1946)
- Headquarters: Fort Belvoir, Virginia
- Employees: 2,100+ civilian and military
- Annual budget: $2.0 billion USD (2023)
- Agency executives: Mr. Andrew Walter, SES, Director; Brigadier General Jarrod J. H. Gillam, United States Army, Acting Deputy Director; Mr. Hunter Lutinski, SES, Executive Director
- Parent agency: U.S. Department of Defense
- Website: www.dtra.mil

The Defense Threat Reduction Agency (DTRA) is both a defense agency and a combat support agency within the United States Department of Defense (DoD) for countering weapons of mass destruction (WMD; chemical, biological, radiological, nuclear, and high explosives) and supporting the nuclear enterprise. Its stated mission is to provide "cross-cutting solutions to enable the Department of Defense, the United States Government, and international partners to Deter strategic attack against the United States and its allies; Prevent, reduce, and counter WMD and emerging threats; and Prevail against WMD-armed adversaries in crisis and conflict." DTRA is headquartered in Fort Belvoir, Virginia. The DTRA mission, organization and management, responsibilities and functions, relationships, authorities, and administration are defined in DoD Directive 5105.62, Defense Threat Reduction Agency (DTRA).

== Organizational history ==
DTRA was officially established on 1 October 1998, as a result of the 1997 Defense Reform Initiative by consolidating several DoD organizations, including the Defense Special Weapons Agency (successor to the Defense Nuclear Agency) and the On-Site Inspection Agency. The Defense Technology Security Administration and the Nunn–Lugar Cooperative Threat Reduction program office in the Office of the Secretary of Defense were also incorporated into the new agency.

In 2002, DTRA published a detailed history of its predecessor agencies, Defense's Nuclear Agency, 1947–1997, the first paragraph of which makes a brief statement about the agencies which led up to the formation of DTRA:

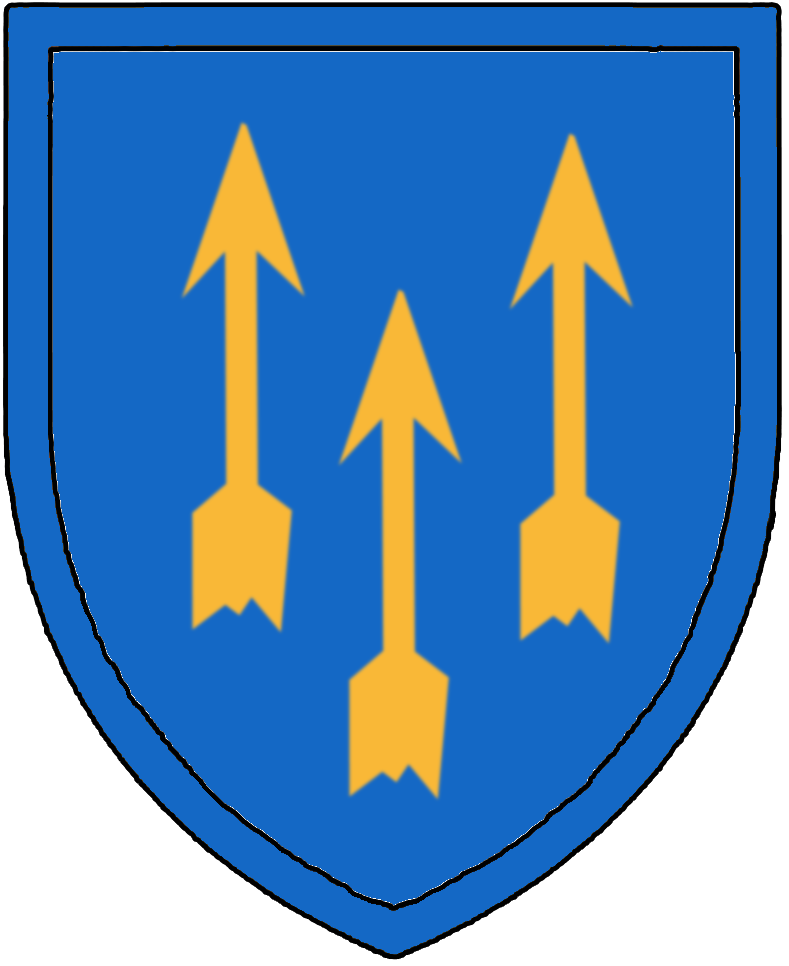
DEFENSE ATOMIC SUPPORT AGENCY SSI

Defense's Nuclear Agency, 1947–1997, traces the development of the Armed Forces Special Weapons Project (AFSWP), and its descendant government organizations, from its original founding in 1947 to 1997. After the disestablishment of the Manhattan Engineering District (MED) in 1947, AFSWP was formed to provide military training in nuclear weapons' operations. Over the years, its sequential descendant organizations have been the Defense Atomic Support Agency (DASA) from 1959 to 1971, the Defense Nuclear Agency (DNA) from 1971 to 1996, and the Defense Special Weapons Agency (DSWA) from 1996 to 1998. In 1998, DSWA, the On-Site Inspection Agency, the Defense Technology Security Administration, and selected elements of the Office of Secretary of Defense were combined to form the Defense Threat Reduction Agency (DTRA).

DTRA employs approximately 1,400 DoD civilians and 800 uniformed service members at more than a dozen permanent locations worldwide. Most personnel are at DTRA headquarters at Fort Belvoir. Approximately 15% of the workforce is split between Kirtland Air Force Base and the White Sands Missile Range in New Mexico, and the Nevada National Security Site (formerly the Nevada Test Site), where they test and support the U.S. military's nuclear mission. The remaining 15% of the workforce is stationed in Germany, Kazakhstan, Azerbaijan, Uzbekistan, Georgia, Ukraine, Armenia, Kenya, South Korea, Japan, and Singapore. DTRA also has liaisons with the U.S. military's Combatant Commands, the National Guard Bureau, the FBI and other U.S. government interagency partners.

In 2005, the United States Strategic Command (USSTRATCOM) was designated as the lead Combatant Command for the integration and synchronization of DoD's efforts in support of the government's "Combating WMD" objectives. It was at this time that the SCC-WMD was co-located with DTRA. The Combat Command designation was changed again in 2017 when responsibility was moved to U.S. Special Operations Command (USSOCOM).

In 2012, the Standing Joint Force Headquarters for Elimination (SJFHQ-E) was relocated to the DTRA/SCC-WMD headquarters at Fort Belvoir. This centralized the DoD's Combating Weapons of Mass Destruction operations, a move recommended in the 2010 Quadrennial Defense Review.

On 30 September 2016, the Joint Improvised-Threat Defeat Agency (JIDA) became part of DTRA and was renamed the Joint Improvised-Threat Defeat Organization (JIDO) in accordance with the 2016 National Defense Authorization Act (NDAA). In Section 1532 of the NDAA, Congress directed the DoD to move JIDA to a military department or under an existing defense agency.

DTRA requested a base budget of $2.0 billion for fiscal year 2023 (FY23), including $998 million for Operation and Maintenance, $654 million for Research, Development, Test and Evaluation, $342 million for Cooperative Threat Reduction, and $14 million for Procurement.

In her February 2024 Director’s Strategic Intent 2022-2027, DTRA Director Rebecca Hersman noted that DTRA would transition its intelligence resources and authorities to the Defense Intelligence Agency.

== Responsibilities ==
=== Destruction of Soviet arms ===
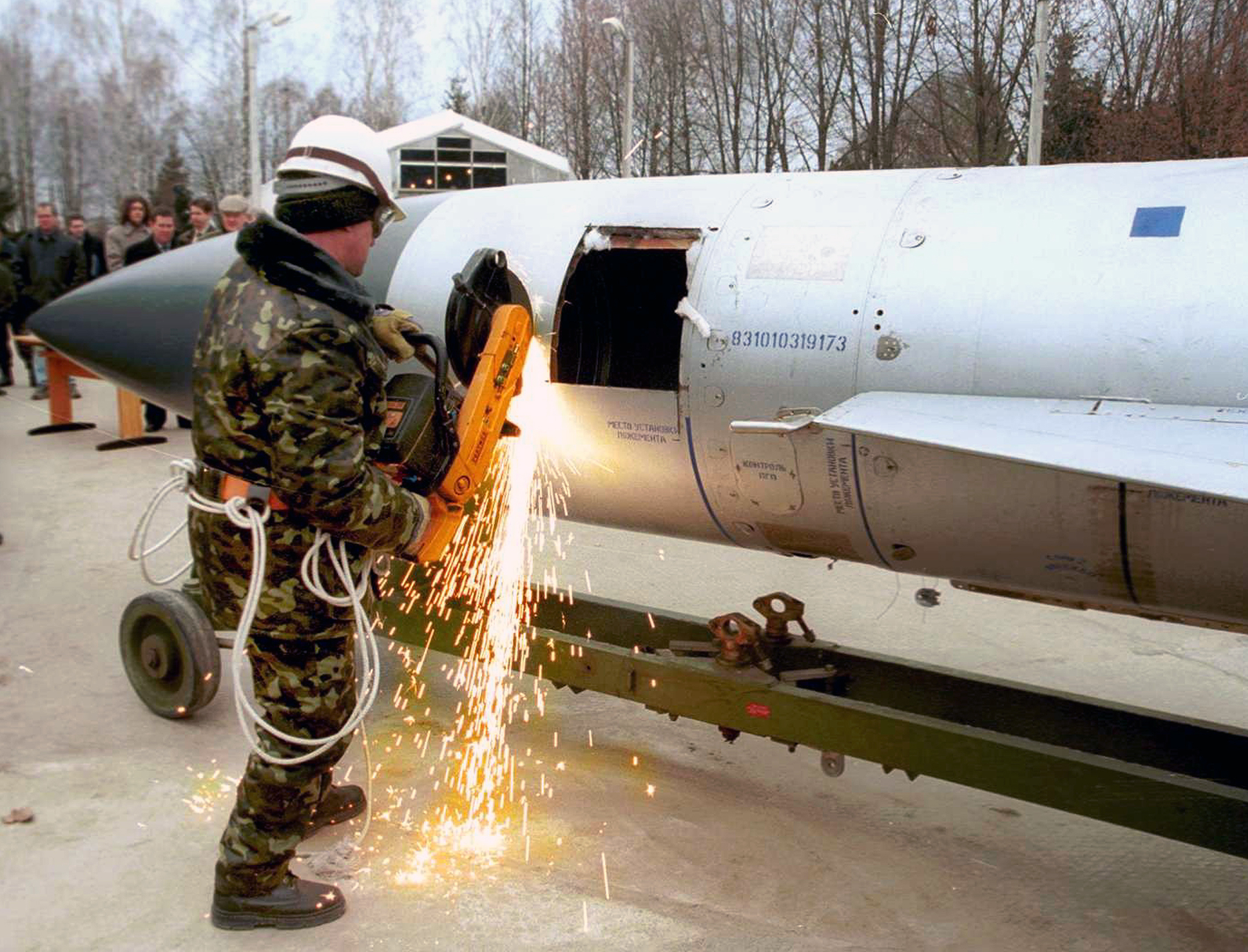
A Ukrainian worker begins the first cut on a Kh-22 air-to-surface missile during elimination activities at an air base in Ozerne, Ukraine. The weapon was eliminated under the Nunn–Lugar Cooperative Threat Reduction program implemented by the Defense Threat Reduction Agency.

After the end of the Cold War, DTRA and its predecessor agencies implemented the DoD aspects of several treaties that assist former Eastern Bloc countries in the destruction of Soviet era nuclear weapons sites (such as missile silos and plutonium production facilities), biological weapons sites (such as the Soviet biological weapons program), and chemical weapons sites (such as the GosNIIOKhT) in an attempt to avert potential weapons proliferation in the post-Soviet era as part of the Nunn–Lugar Cooperative Threat Reduction program.

=== Nuclear Test Personnel Review ===
The Nuclear Test Personnel Review (NTPR) program is the DoD program that confirms veteran participation in U.S. nuclear tests from 1945 to 1992, and the occupation forces of Hiroshima and Nagasaki, Japan. If a veteran is a confirmed participant in these events, NTPR may provide either an actual or estimated radiation dose received by the veteran. The Department of Veterans Affairs (VA) and the Department of Justice (DOJ) may request this information from DTRA as required.

Members of this group are sometimes referred to as atomic veterans or atomic vets.

In addition, NTPR supports the Atomic Veterans Service Recognition Program. This program recognizes that the service and sacrifice of the Atomic Veterans directly contributed to our Nation‘s continued freedom and prosperity during the period following World War II, and was pivotal to our Nation‘s defense during the Cold War era. For the Secretary of War, it awards the Atomic Veterans Commemorative Service Medal and the Atomic Veteran's Service Certificate.

=== Arms control treaty responsibilities ===
DTRA is responsible for US reporting under the New START Treaty and the Intermediate-Range Nuclear Forces Treaty.

DTRA is also responsible for reducing the threat of conventional war, especially in Europe, by participating in various arms control treaties to which the United States is a party, such as the Conventional Forces in Europe treaty, the Transparency in Armaments activity of the United Nations, and the Wassenaar Arrangement, as well as the Chemical Weapons Convention, the Plutonium Production Reactor Agreement, the Dayton Peace Accords, the Vienna Document and the Global Exchange of Military Information program under the auspices of the Organization for Security and Co-operation in Europe.

=== Domestic chemical and biological management ===
DTRA has the responsibility to manage and integrate the Department of Defense chemical and biological defense science and technology programs. In accordance with the Recommendation 174 (h) of the 2005 Base Closure and Realignment Commission, part of the Chemical Biological Defense Research component of the DTRA was relocated to Edgewood Chemical Biological Center, Aberdeen Proving Ground, Maryland in 2011. This represented a move of about ten percent of the staff of the Chemical Biological Defense Research component of DTRA to Aberdeen Proving Ground; the rest of the staff remain at Fort Belvoir.

== Notable missions, projects, and programs ==
=== Ebola (2003-2014) ===
DTRA has spent approximately $300 million on scientific R&D efforts since 2003, developing vaccines and therapeutic treatments against viral hemorrhagic fever, including Ebola. Starting in 2007, DTRA partnered with the National Institute of Allergy and Infectious Diseases (NIAID) of the United States Department of Health and Human Services and the United States Army Medical Research Institute of Infectious Diseases (USAMRIID) to fund research on the drug now called ZMapp, which has since been used on several patients.

DTRA also funded and managed the research on the EZ1 assay used to detect and diagnose the presence of the Ebola Zaire virus in humans. EZ1 was given Emergency Use Authorization by the Food and Drug Administration (FDA) in August 2014. DTRA first developed EZ1 as part of a 2011 "bio-preparedness initiative" for the United States Department of Defense to prepare for a possible Ebola outbreak. EZ1 was used to identify infected patients in West Africa.

The Nunn-Lugar Cooperative Threat Reduction program provided for the DTRA to award a $4 million contract to MRIGlobal to "configure, equip, deploy and staff two quick response mobile laboratory systems (MLS) to support the ongoing Ebola outbreak in West Africa." The labs were deployed to Sierra Leone.

=== Transport Isolation System (2014) ===
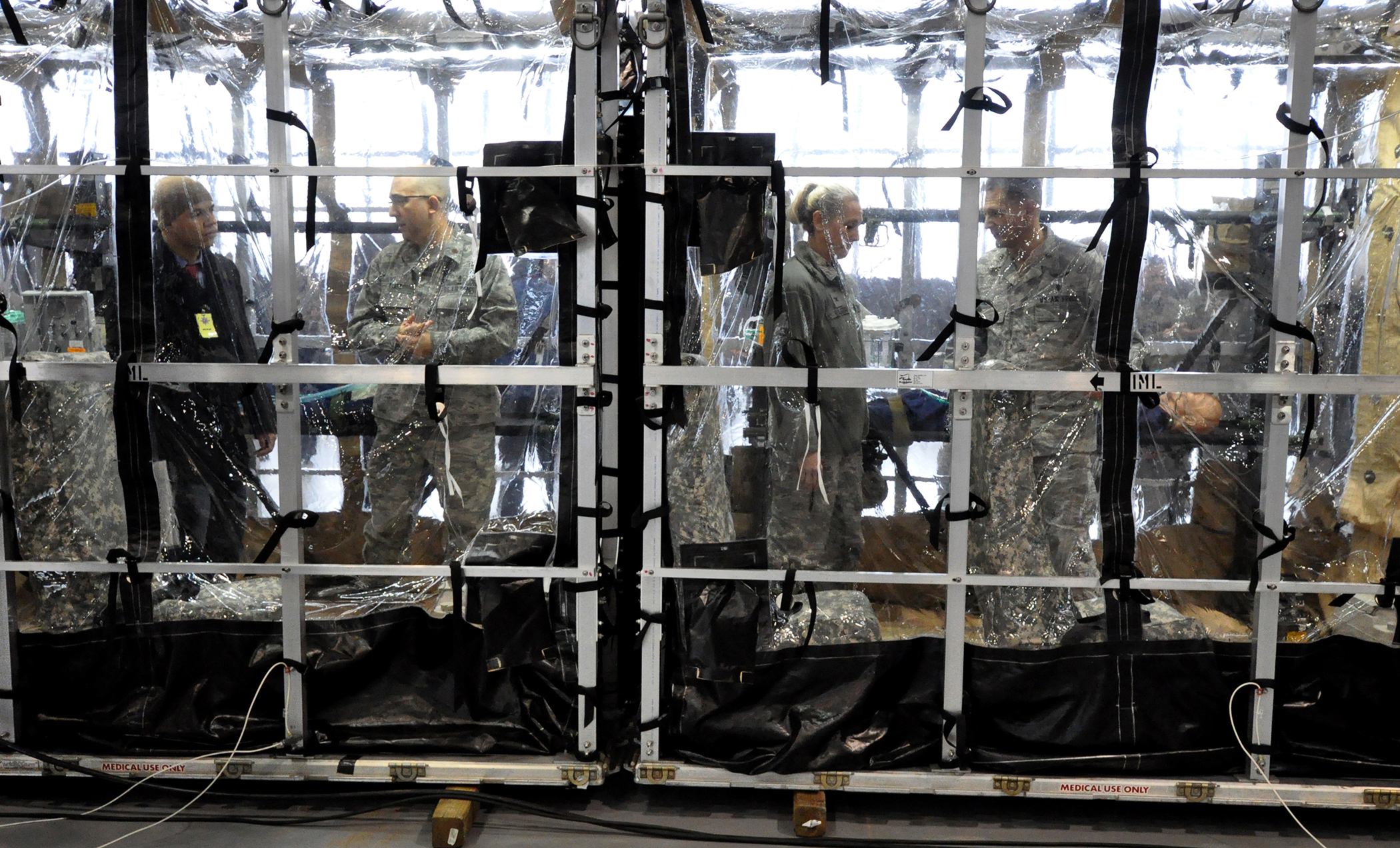
Members of the local area media and Scott Air Force Base medical personnel tour the Transport Isolation System 23 January 2015, during a roll-out ceremony for the system on Scott AFB, Illinois. (USTRANSCOM photo)

DTRA was the program manager for the Transport Isolation System (TIS), overseeing its design, testing, contracting, and production. The TIS is a sealed, self-contained patient containment unit that can be loaded into the United States Air Force (USAF) C-17 Globemaster or C-130 Hercules cargo planes for aeromedical evacuation. The TIS was designed for U.S. troops exposed to or infected with Ebola while serving in Operation United Assistance, but it can also be used to transport others exposed to or infected with a highly contagious disease. It can hold eight patients lying down, 12 sitting, or a combination of both. DTRA worked with the Air Force Life Cycle Management Center (AFLCMC) and United States Transportation Command (USTRANSCOM) on the TIS; St. Louis-based Production Products was awarded a sole-source contract to produce 25 TIS units.

=== Syria's chemical weapons (2014) ===
DTRA was one of the key United States Department of Defense agencies that developed the Field Deployable Hydrolysis System (FDHS) used to destroy Syria's chemical weapons aboard the U.S.-flagged container ship MV Cape Ray in the summer of 2014 after Syria agreed to give up its chemical weapons stockpile under international pressure and in accordance with United Nations Security Council Resolution 2118. DTRA partnered with the United States Army Edgewood Chemical Biological Center (ECBC) to develop the FDHS and then modify it for ship-borne operations after Syrian President Bashar al-Assad agreed to turn over his country's poison gas arsenal and chemical weapon production equipment to the Organisation for the Prohibition of Chemical Weapons (OPCW), but no country volunteered to host the destruction process.

Two FDHS units destroyed more than 600 tons of Sarin and mustard agents, completing the task several weeks ahead of schedule. The remaining materials were then taken to Finland and Germany for final disposal. DTRA was awarded its third Joint Meritorious Unit Award for successfully destroying Syria's declared chemical weapons.

=== Massive Ordnance Penetrator (to 2010) ===
DTRA funded, managed, and tested the Massive Ordnance Penetrator (MOP) bomb until February 2010, when the program was turned over to the USAF. DTRA developed the MOP to fulfill a long-standing Air Force requirement for a weapon that could destroy hard and deeply buried targets. The MOP is a 30,000-pound, 20.5-foot-long bomb dropped from B-52 and B-2 bombers at high altitude that can reportedly penetrate 200 feet of reinforced concrete. The MOP contains a 5,300-pound explosive charge, more than ten times the explosive power of its predecessor, the BLU-109 "bunker buster."

=== Project MAXIMUS (to 2003) ===
In 2003, a DTRA task force was identifying, collecting, and securing radiological material in Iraq as part of Operation Iraqi Freedom, including almost two tons of low-enriched uranium (LEU), several hundred tons of yellowcake (a type of uranium powder), and other radioactive sources. Code-named Project MAXIMUS, DTRA, and the United States Department of Energy moved 1.77 metric tons of LEU and approximately 1,000 highly radioactive sources out of Iraq by the summer of 2004. DTRA task force members also secured the yellowcake in a bunker in Tuwaitha, Iraq, which was turned over to the Iraqi Ministry of Science and Technology; the remaining 550 tons of yellowcake were sold in 2008 to Cameco, a uranium producer in Canada.

=== COVID-19 ===
In late 2019, DTRA established the Discovery of Medical Countermeasures Against Novel Entities (DOMANE) program. Shortly afterwards, the COVID-19 pandemic began, and DOMANE started researching existing, pre-approved medications like Pepcid (famotidine) for potential cost-effective treatments for COVID-19.

=== Midnight Hammer (2025) ===
The DTRA's main contribution to operation Midnight Hammer in 2025 was the development of the GBU-57, the world's largest bunker busting munition. They tested the effectiveness before turning the munitions over to the Air Force.

== In popular culture ==
- In Blindspot (TV series), Michelle Hurd as Ellen "Shepherd" Briggs (season 2; recurring seasons 3–4; guest season 5) was a U.S. Army major general with the Defense Threat Reduction Agency.

== Awards and official recognition ==
=== Joint Meritorious Unit Award ===
DTRA and its legacy agencies have been awarded numerous Joint Meritorious Unit Awards (JMUA) since the JMUA was implemented in 1982 (made retroactive to 1979):

Defense Nuclear Agency

- 1st JMUA: 1 July 1981 – 20 June 1984
- 2nd JMUA: 1 January 1993 – 31 May 1995

On-Site Inspection Agency

- 1st JMUA: 15 January 1988 – 31 December 1988
- 2nd JMUA: 1 January 1989 – 30 July 1993
- 3rd JMUA: 1 August 1993 – 31 July 1996
- 4th JMUA: 1998

Defense Special Weapons Agency

- 1st JMUA: 1 June 1995 – 30 September 1998

Defense Threat Reduction Agency

- 1st JMUA: 1 October 1998 – 5 March 2000
- 2nd JMUA: 6 March 2000 – 30 June 2003
- 3rd JMUA: 1 October 2009 – 20 September 2011
- 4th JMUA: 1 May 2012 – 1 November 2014

== Directors ==
- Jay C. Davis (1998–2001)
- Robert P. Bongiovi (2001, acting)
- Stephen M. Younger (2001–2004)
- Trudy H. Clark (2004–2005, acting)
- James A. Tegnelia (2005-2009)
- Kenneth A. Myers III (2008–2016)
- Shari Durand (2016-2017, acting)
- Michael L. Bruhn (2017, acting)
- Vayl S. Oxford (2017–2021)
- Rhys M. Williams (2021–2022, acting)
- Rebecca Hersman (2022–2025)
- Lyle K. Drew (2025–2026)
- Andrew Walter (2026-Present)

== See also ==
- National Counterproliferation Center
- Defense Treaty Ready Inspection Readiness Program
- USSTRATCOM Center for Combating Weapons of Mass Destruction
