= Yoyang Ja clan =

Korean clan from Liaoning, China

- Country: Korea
- Current region: Liaoyang
- Founder: Ja Ho sang
- Connected members: Ja Song-nam

Yoyang Ja clan (Korean: 요양 자씨; Hanja: 遼陽 慈氏) was one of the Korean clans. Their Bon-gwan was in Liaoyang, Liaoning, China. According to the research in 2000, the number of Yoyang Ja clan was 85. Their founder was Ja Ho sang who was from Jingzhou in China. Ja Ho sang died in the war against Mongolia in 1557. Ja Hong seon (Hanja: 慈弘善), a son of Ja Ho sang, immigrated to Liaoyang. Then, Ja Hong seon (Hanja: 慈弘善) immigrated to Kilju County with his sons named Ja Gyeong bo (Hanja: 慈慶輔), Ja Sun jik (Hanja: 慈順直), Ja Sun hui (Hanja: 慈順熙), and Ja Gyeong jo (Hanja: 慈慶祖) in order to avoid conflicts. Finally, Ja Hong seon (Hanja: 慈弘善) founded Yoyang Ja clan and made Liaoyang their Bon-gwan where he used to live.

== See also ==
- Korean clan names of foreign origin
