= Embassy of North Korea, London =

Embassy of the Democratic People’s Republic of Korea in London
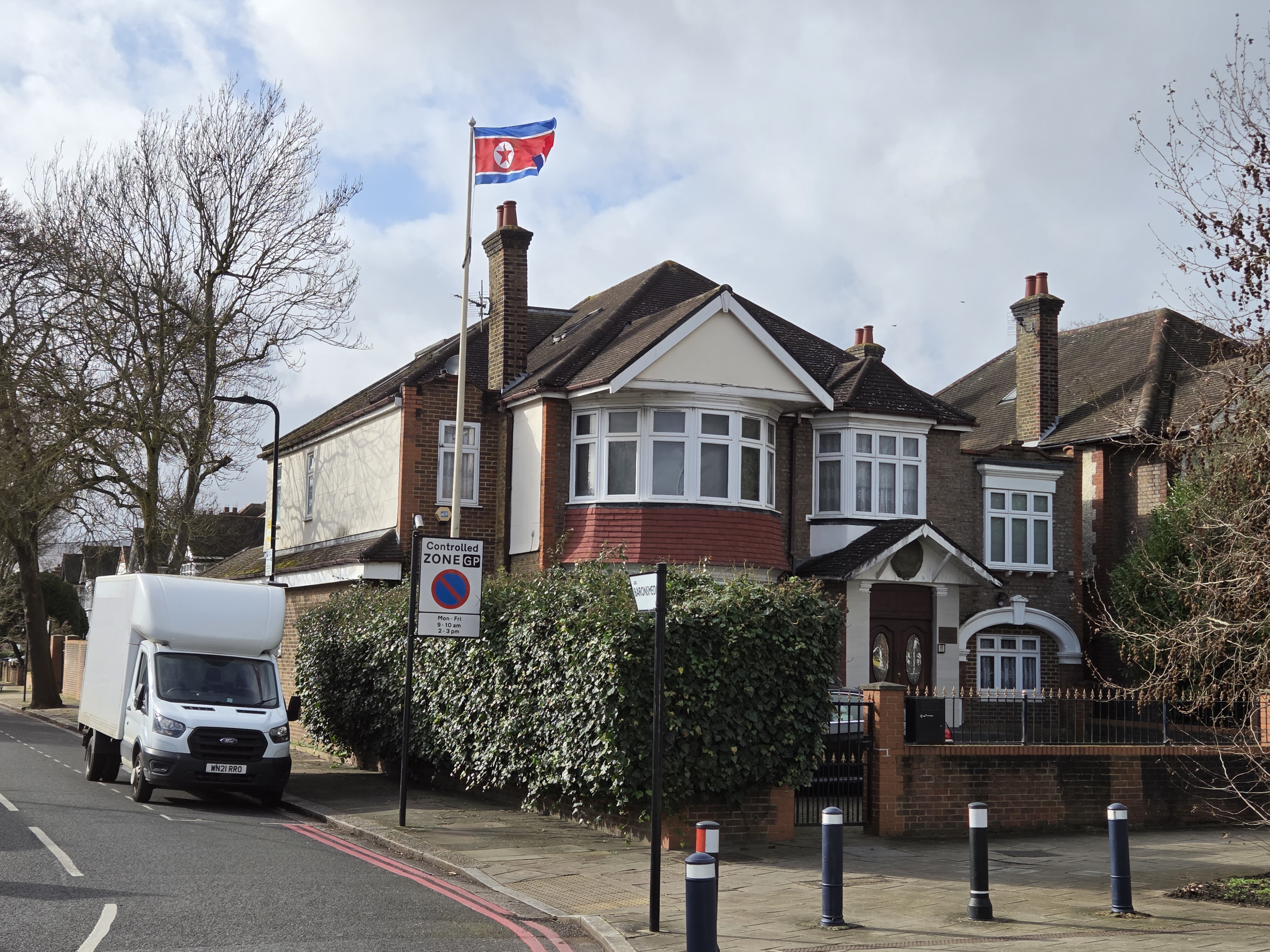
- The embassy in 2026
- Location: Ealing, London
- Address: 73 Gunnersbury Avenue, London, W5 4LP
- Coordinates: 51.50310°N 0.28915°W

The Embassy of the Democratic People's Republic of Korea in London is the diplomatic mission of North Korea to the United Kingdom. The official residence of the Ambassador of North Korea to the United Kingdom, it is located in a detached house at 73 Gunnersbury Avenue on the northern corner junction with Baronsmede, in Ealing, a suburban district of west London. It is notable for being one of the few embassies in London located in a suburban area, away from the central diplomatic areas of the city.

== History ==
The seven-bedroom property was purchased by the North Korean government for £1.3 million in 2003.

In November 2014, an exhibition of art from the Mansudae Art Studio was held at the embassy, to coincide with the visit of four North Korean artists to London.

The former deputy ambassador Thae Yong-ho defected to South Korea in 2016. The ambassador at the time was Hyon Hak-bong. As of 25 August 2016, Hyon is reported to have been recalled to North Korea following Thae's defection. North Korean leader Kim Jong-un reportedly ordered the execution of those who failed to prevent Thae's defection. Choe Il was subsequently appointed ambassador to London. The regime took extra steps to discourage diplomats from defecting.

In September 2017 a suspicious package was found outside the embassy. As a result, the area's roads and homes were closed and evacuated by the Metropolitan Police who also carried out a controlled explosion. After the controlled explosion, it was found that the package was non-threatening.

In June 2026, North Korea recalled its ambassador to the United Kingdom, Mun Myong Sin, who had taken up the post the previous month, and downgraded diplomatic relations to the level of chargé d'affaires. North Korea stated that relations would remain at this level until Britain lifted sanctions it had imposed in May 2026 on the Songdowon International Children's Camp, which the UK had designated as part of Russian-run youth programmes involved in the deportation and indoctrination of Ukrainian children. North Korea described the sanctions as groundless and politically motivated, while Britain's Foreign, Commonwealth and Development Office declined to comment on the ambassador's status.

== Gallery ==
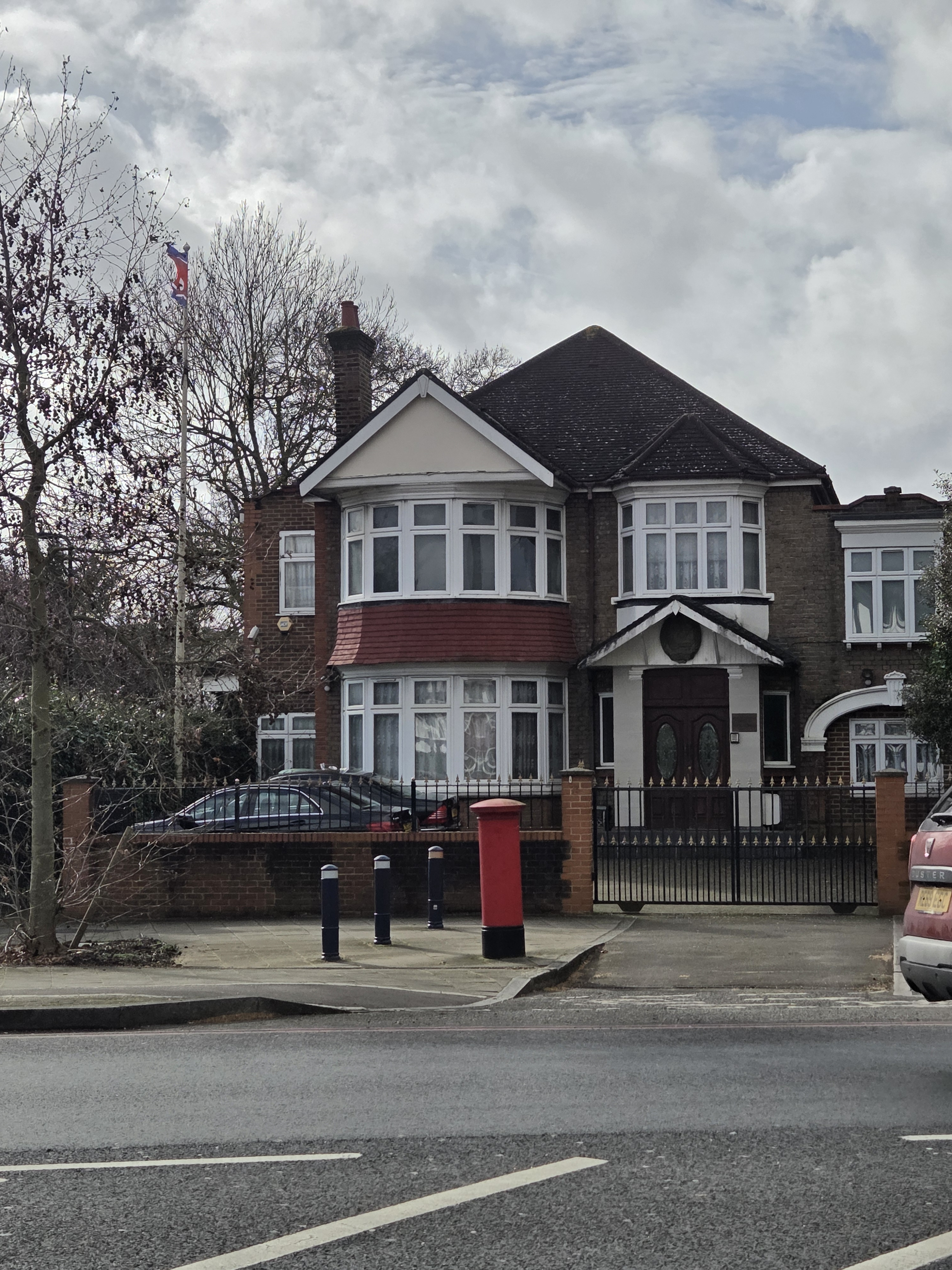
Outside the embassy in 2026

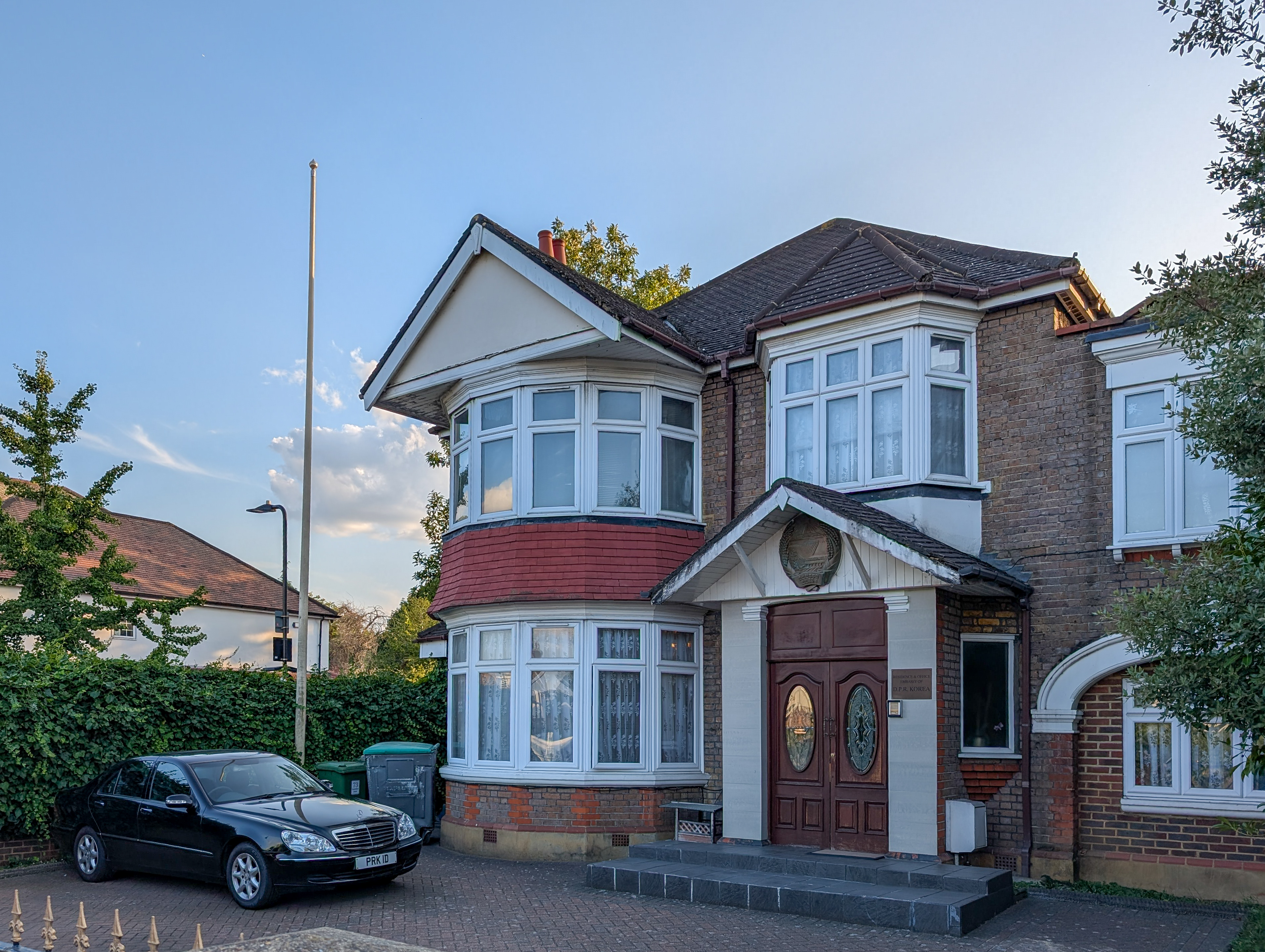
The embassy's facade in 2025

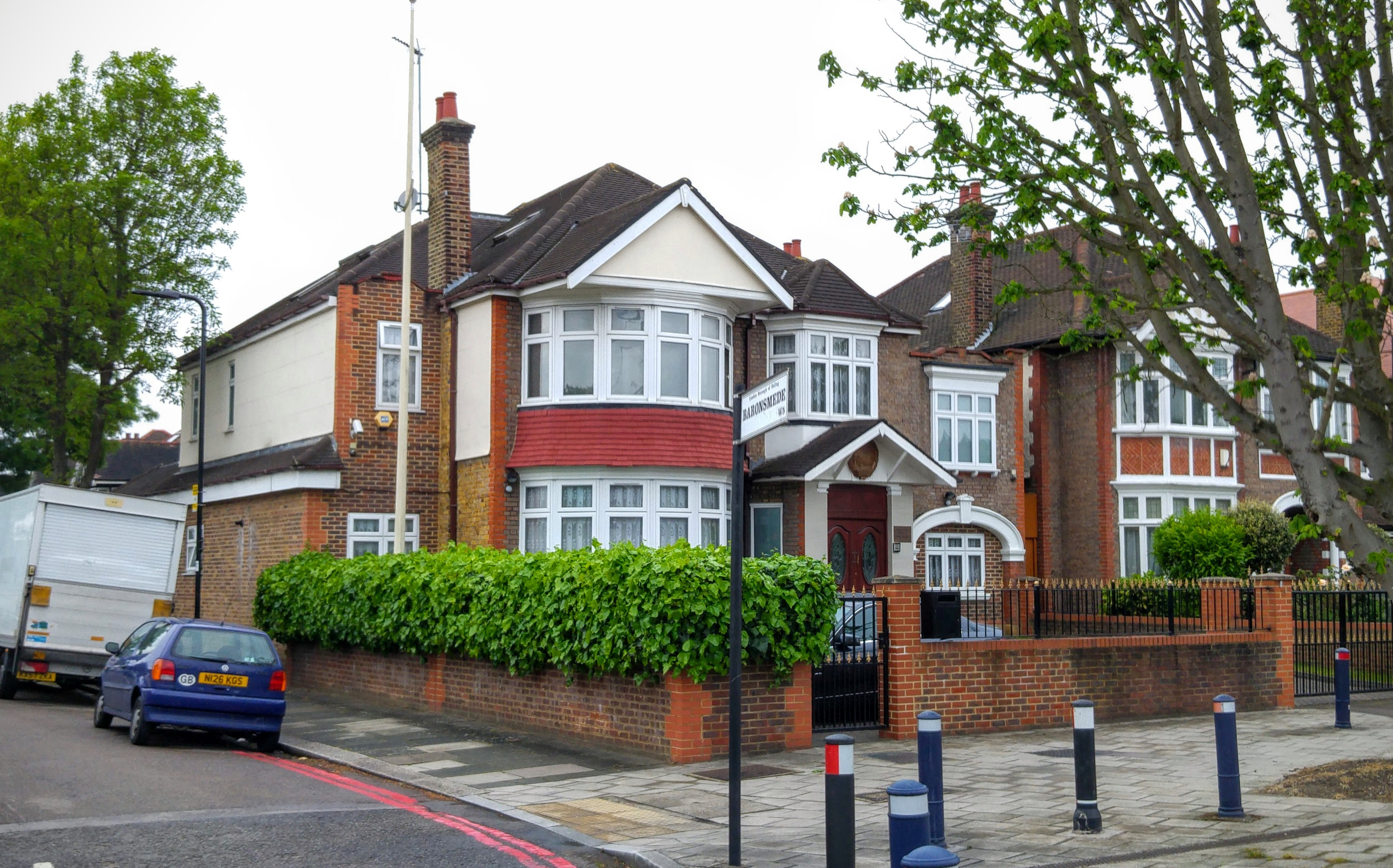
The embassy in 2016

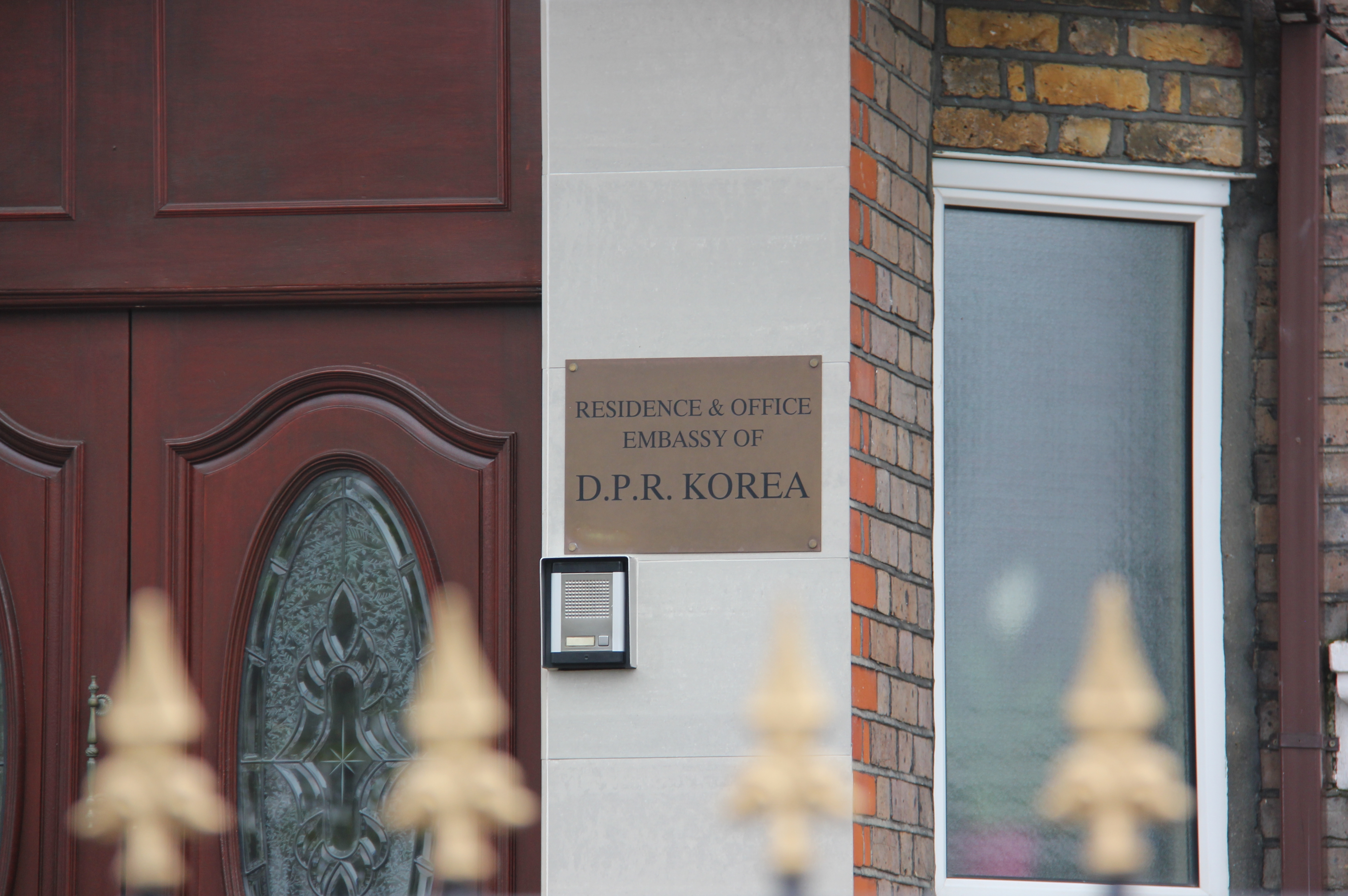
Sign outside the embassy in 2015

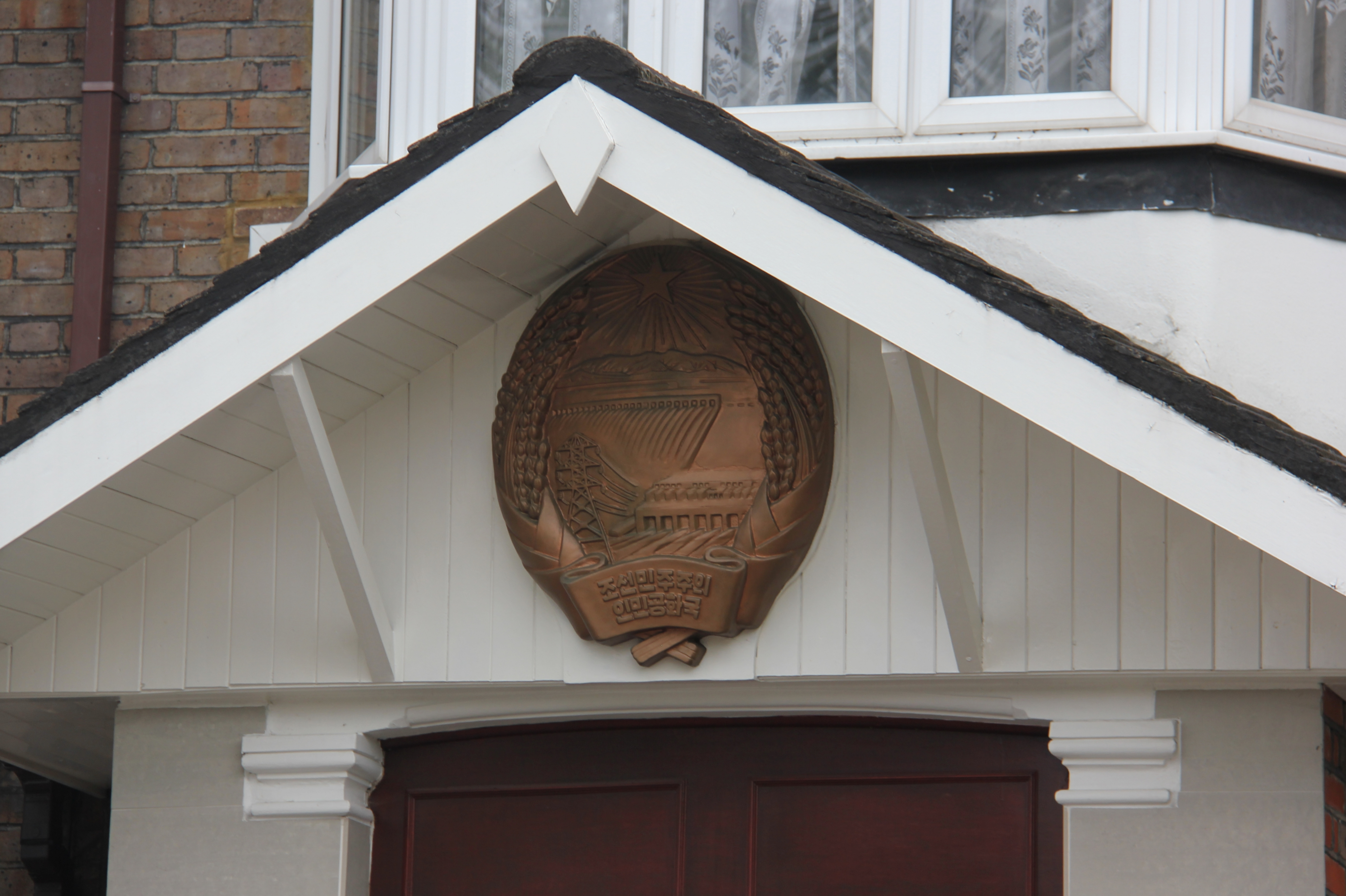
Emblem above the embassy door in 2015

== See also ==
- Embassy of the United Kingdom, Pyongyang
- Foreign relations of North Korea
- List of ambassadors of North Korea to the United Kingdom
- List of diplomatic missions of North Korea
- North Korea–United Kingdom relations
