= North Korea–United Kingdom relations =

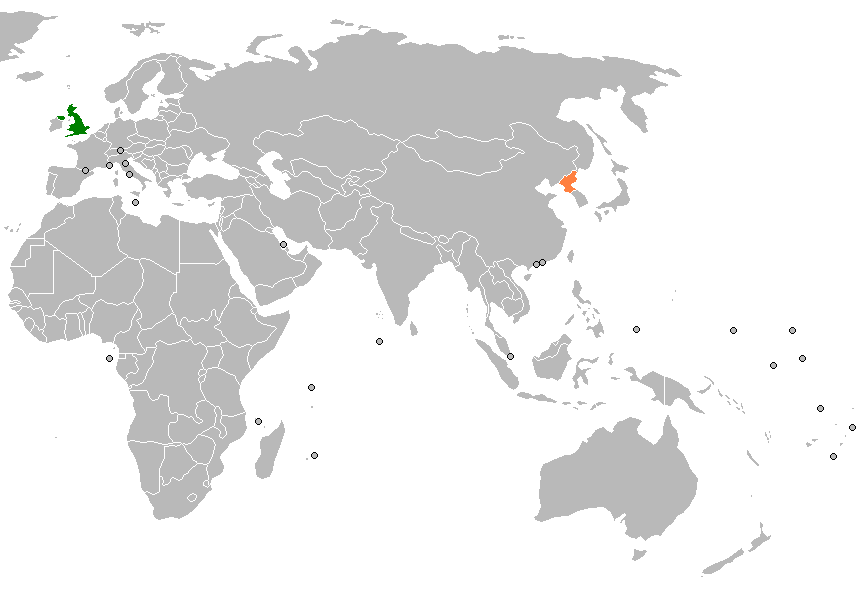

- United Kingdom: North Korea

Diplomatic mission
- Embassy of the United Kingdom, Pyongyang: Embassy of North Korea, London

Envoy
- Ambassador Simon Wood: Charge d'affaires

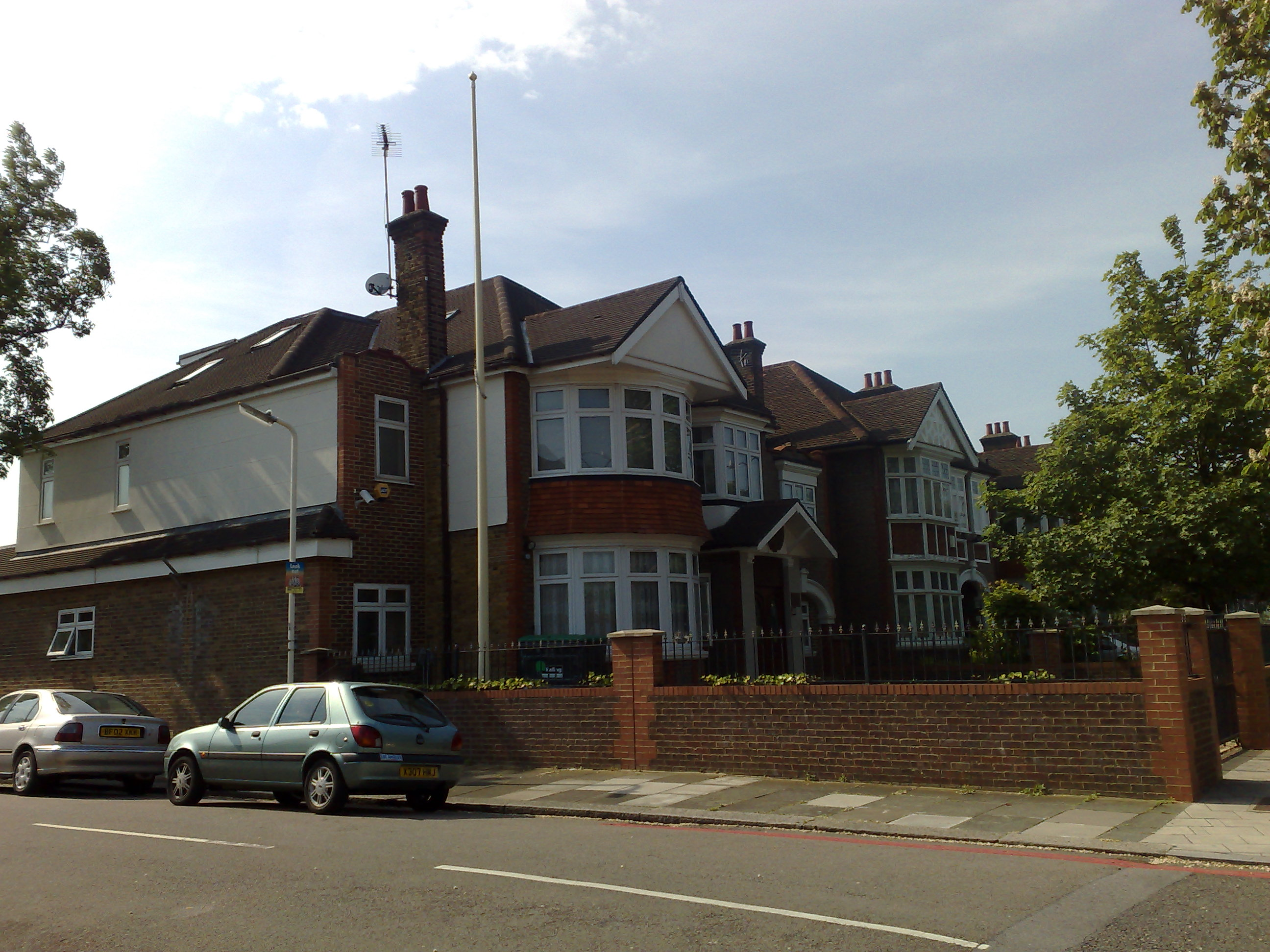
North Korean embassy in London, United Kingdom.

North Korea–United Kingdom relations (Korean: 영국-조선민주주의인민공화국 관계) are the foreign and bilateral relations between North Korea and the United Kingdom.

North Korea has an embassy in London and the United Kingdom has an embassy in Pyongyang which opened in 2003 and 2001 respectively after diplomatic relations were established between the two countries in 2000.

== History ==
=== Korean war ===
During the Korean War the two countries were on opposing sides with the UK overseeing the British Commonwealth Forces Korea serving the United Nations (UN). Later during the Cold War the United Kingdom was a strong ally of the United States while North Korea was an ally of the Soviet Union.

=== Football ===
The North Korea national football team played in the 1966 FIFA World Cup in England. The UK government did not recognise North Korea and feared that its presence would strain relations with South Korea and the United States. FIFA told England's Football Association that the tournament would be moved if any qualified team were to be refused entry. On the suggestion of the British Foreign Office, the playing of national anthems, and meetings between players and state figures such as Queen Elizabeth II, would only take place in two games: the opener and the final. North Korea was not scheduled for the former, and was considered unlikely to reach the latter. A Foreign Office suggestion for flags outside stadiums to be removed after each team's elimination, in the expectation of an early North Korean exit, was vetoed by the Department of Education and Science. The Foreign Office apologised to the South Korean ambassador for the flying of North Korean flags at stadiums.

North Korea's team became the adopted team of Middlesbrough which was where they played their group games during the competition. North Korea's team had a remarkable victory by beating Italy 1–0 at Ayresome Park, Middlesbrough and finished above them, thus earning qualification to the next round. Middlesbrough fans went on to support North Korea's team in the next round of the tournament, with many travelling to Liverpool to watch the team play against Portugal. In 2002, members of North Korea team returned to Middlesbrough for an official visit, after the release of a film The Game of Their Lives about the team's visit in 1966.

=== Diplomatic relations since 2000 ===
Following initial progress in North Korea–South Korea relations, North Korea and the United Kingdom established diplomatic relations on 12 December 2000, opening resident embassies in London and Pyongyang. The United Kingdom provides English language and human rights training to DPRK officials, urging the North Korean government to allow a visit by the UN Special Rapporteur for Human Rights, and it oversees bilateral humanitarian projects in North Korea.

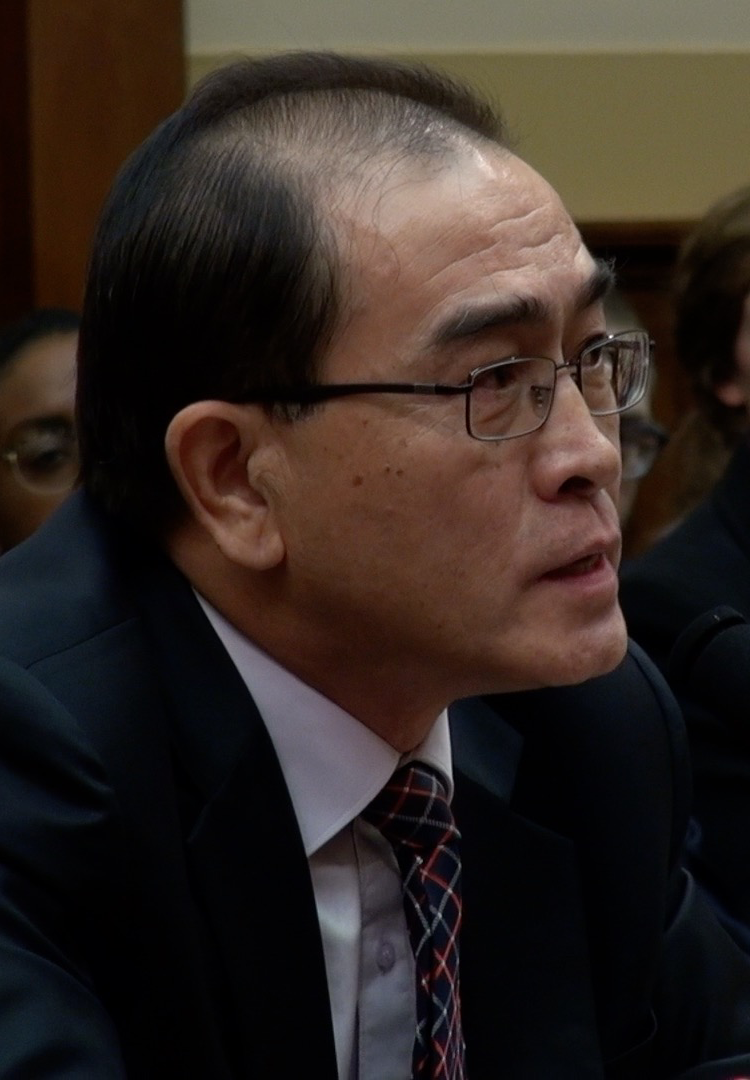
Thae Yong-ho (2017)

An edited version of the British film Bend It Like Beckham was broadcast on North Korean state television on 26 December 2010. The broadcast was organised by the British embassy and commemorated ten years of relations between the two countries. The British Ambassador to South Korea, Martin Uden, said it was the "first ever Western made film to air on television" in North Korea.

The United Kingdom has been critical of the nuclear program of North Korea. On 5 April 2013, the North Korean government advised the British Embassy, and all other missions, that the safety of their missions could not be assured past 10 April 2013. This was part of the North Korean government's response to UN Resolution 2094 and deterioration of North Korean relations with South Korea and the United States.

In August 2016, the Deputy Ambassador of North Korea to the United Kingdom, Thae Yong-ho, defected to South Korea with the assistance of British SIS officials. Ambassador Hyon Hak-bong was summoned back to North Korea after that incident.

On 11 May 2026, the United Kingdom placed sanctions on North Korea's Songdowon International Children's Camp, accusing it of "engaging in and providing support for … Russia’s programme for the forced deportation and re-education of Ukrainian children". In reaction, North Korea called the sanction an "extremely provocative act" and recalled its ambassador Mun Myong Sin, stating "We strongly denounce and reject the malicious act of the British government which targets even the camp, a sacred base for education and growth of children, for achieving its purpose of political machination". On 28 August 2026, North Korea announced that it had downgraded its embassy in the UK to the charge d'affaires level and said Ambassador Mun would be reassigned to another post.

== See also ==
- Foreign relations of North Korea
- Foreign relations of the United Kingdom
