= USSTRATCOM Center for Combating Weapons of Mass Destruction =

The USSTRATCOM Center for Combating Weapons of Mass Destruction (SCC-WMD) is a United States Strategic Command center built in cooperation with the Defense Threat Reduction Agency (DTRA).

The SCC-WMD is housed in the Defense Threat Reduction Center (DTRC), the headquarters building of the Defense Threat Reduction Agency (DTRA) that opened January 26, 2006, just outside Washington, D.C.

== History and background ==
At the opening of the new DTRC on January 26, 2006, Dr. James A. Tegnelia, DTRA director, also announced the Initial Operating Capability (IOC) of the SCC-WMD. Guests at the ceremony included: Sen. Richard Lugar, R-Ind.; Hon. Kenneth J. Kreig, Under Secretary of Defense for Acquisition, Technology, and Logistics; Gen. James E. Cartwright, USMC, Combatant Commander, U.S. Strategic Command; Dale E. Klein, assistant to the secretary of defense for nuclear and chemical and biological defense programs; Stephen Younger, former director of DTRA; and Maj. Gen. Trudy H. Clark, USAF, DTRA deputy director.

Senator Lugar, chairman of the Senate Foreign Relations Committee, was the keynote speaker for the ceremony.

== Resources ==
- The components of USSTRATCOM.
- DTRA News Release 26 Jan 06

== See also ==
- Defense Threat Reduction Agency
- United States Strategic Command
- National Counterproliferation Center
