= Pak Kil-yon =

North Korean diplomat (born 1943)

- Hangul: 박길연
- Hanja: 朴吉淵
- RR: Bak Gilyeon
- MR: Pak Kiryŏn

Pak Kil-yon (Korean: 박길연; Korean pronunciation: [pak̚.k͈i.ɾjʌn] or [pak̚] [ki.ɾjʌn]; born 1943) is a North Korean diplomat. He served as Permanent Representative to the United Nations from 2001 to 2008.

== Early life and career ==
Pak was born in 1943 in Chagang. He is a graduate of Pyongyang University of International Affairs. Pak He has served in the North Korean diplomatic corps since 1969, when he was Consul to the embassy in Myanmar. He subsequently served in Singapore, and then domestically as the director-general of the American Bureau of the Ministry of Foreign Affairs. Thereafter he was named chief representative for the North Korean UN mission in 1985. He subsequently served as ambassador to countries including Colombia and Cambodia, before taking his present post. Pak has been a delegate to the 8th, 9th and 11th sessions of the Supreme People's Assembly. He was awarded the Order of Kim Il-sung in 1992.

== Representative to the United Nations ==
Pak was the ambassador to the United Nations for North Korea from 2001 to 2008. During this time, he has called for the UN to prevent Japan from obtaining a permanent seat on the Security Council. On May 13, 2005, he met with Joseph DeTrani, a special envoy for the United States, to discuss a North Korean return to the "six-party talks" on North Korean nuclear proliferation. This meeting was the first between US and North Korean officials in six months.

He is known sarcastically by diplomats as 'Dr. Chuckles' because of his rhetoric. Following the 2006 North Korean nuclear test, Pak made headlines when he said that the United Nations should "congratulate" his country's scientists and researchers on their achievement, instead of issuing what he called "notorious, useless and reckless resolutions." Following the United Nations Security Council's imposition of sanctions on North Korea, Pak called the Council's actions "gangster-like" and stormed out of the chamber. This led to then-U.S. Permanent Representative to the United Nations John R. Bolton replying that that action was the equivalent of Nikita Khrushchev pounding his shoe at the United Nations in 1960.

== See also ==
- Politics of North Korea

Diplomatic posts
Preceded by Ri Hyong-chol	Permanent Representative to the United Nations; 2001–2008	Succeeded by Sin Son-ho
