= List of ambassadors of North Korea to the United Kingdom =

Ambassador of North Korea to the United Kingdom Embassy of North Korea, London
- 주 영국 조선민주주의인민공화국 특명전권대사
- Emblem of North Korea

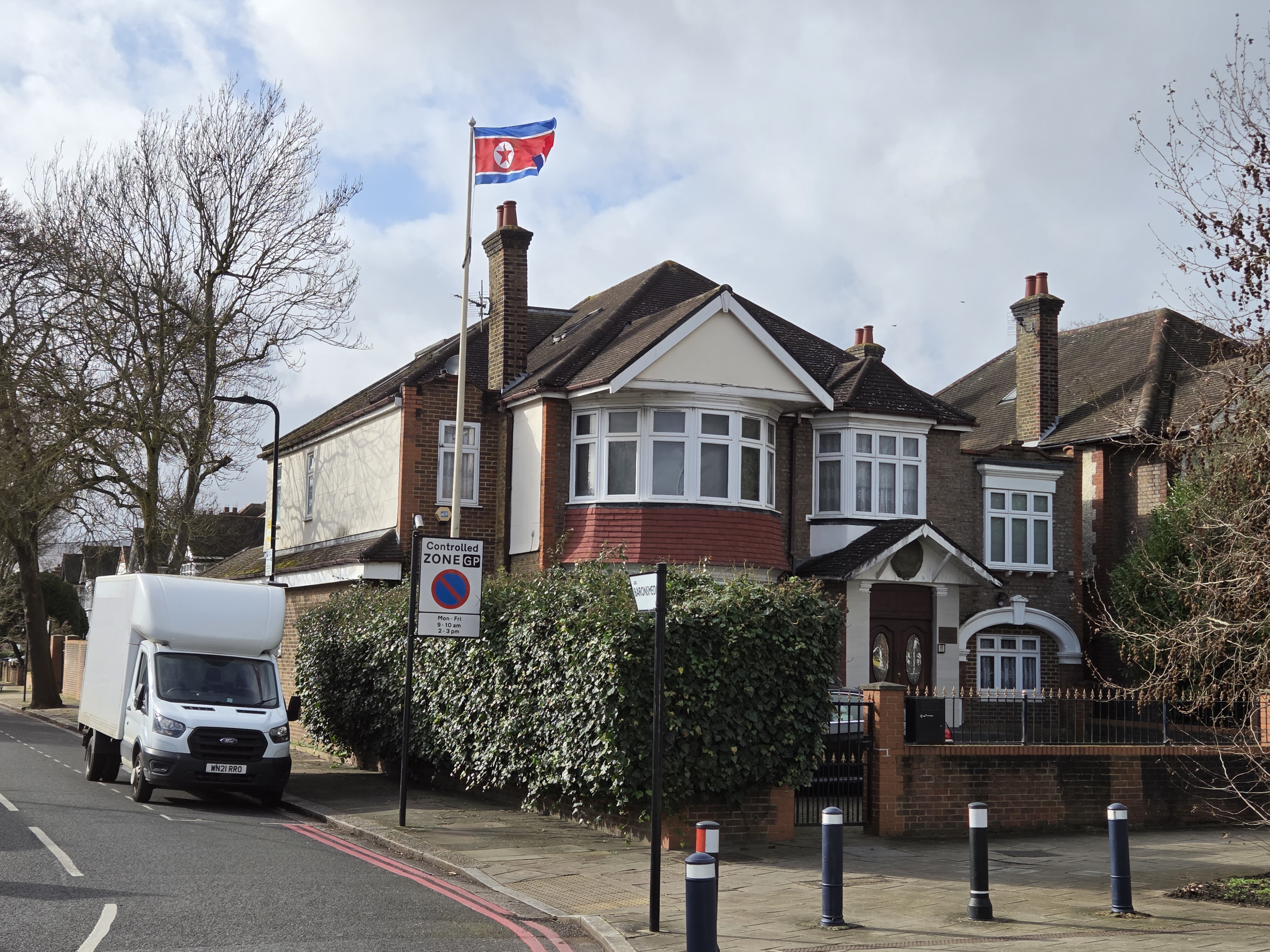
- Incumbent; Mun Myong Sin since 2026
- Style: Mr. Ambassador (informal); His Excellency (diplomatic)
- Reports to: Ministry of Foreign Affairs
- Residence: 73 Gunnersbury Ave, London W5 4LP, United Kingdom
- Term length: No fixed term
- Formation: September 5, 2003

The North Korean Ambassador to the Court of St James's in London is the official representative of the government of North Korea to the government of the United Kingdom.

== List of ambassadors ==
#	Diplomatic accreditation	Ambassador	Leader of North Korea	Prime Minister of the United Kingdom	End of term	Ref
1	5 September 2003	Ri Yong-ho	Kim Jong-il	Tony Blair	2006	
2	2006	Ja Song-nam	Kim Jong-il	Tony Blair	2011	
2	2006	Ja Song-nam	Kim Jong-il	Gordon Brown	2011	
2	2006	Ja Song-nam	Kim Jong-il	David Cameron	2011	
3	2011	Hyon Hak-bong	Kim Jong-il	Theresa May	25 August 2016	
4	2016	Choe Il	Kim Jong-un	Theresa May	2026	
4	2016	Choe Il	Kim Jong-un	Boris Johnson	2026	
4	2016	Choe Il	Kim Jong-un	Liz Truss	2026	
4	2016	Choe Il	Kim Jong-un	Rishi Sunak	2026	
4	2016	Choe Il	Kim Jong-un	Keir Starmer	2026	
5	2026	Mun Myong Sin	Kim Jong-un	Keir Starmer	Incumbent	

== See also ==
- Embassy of North Korea, London
- Ministry of Foreign Affairs (North Korea)
- North Korea–United Kingdom relations
