= Defense Treaty Ready Inspection Readiness Program =

The Defense Treaty Ready Inspection Readiness Program (DTIRP) is a United States Department of Defense (DoD) security preparedness and outreach program designed to provide security education and awareness concerning the operational activities associated with arms control implementation. DTIRP uses specially trained personnel, analyses, and educational activities to provide arms control implementation advice and assistance to facilities subject to on-site inspection activities and observation overflights.

The authority for the DTIRP outreach program is provided by Department of Defense Instruction 5205.10, Department of Defense Treaty Inspection Readiness Program (DTIRP). This Directive states the purpose of the DTIRP outreach program as being to ensure the continued protection of Department of Defense programs, operations, and activities by providing security preparedness education, assistance, and advice concerning the wide range of operational activities associated with implementing arms control treaties and agreements.

== History ==
The precursor to the DTIRP outreach program was the Defense Contractor Inspection Readiness Program (DCIRP), which was established in August 1990 by the Deputy Under Secretary of Defense for Security Policy to assist the defense contractor community with developing and implementing effective security countermeasures at facilities subject to inspection under the Strategic Arms Reduction Treaty (START).

In the fall of 1991, DCIRP was reorganized, renamed "DTIRP," and transferred to the Assistant Secretary of Defense for Command, Control, Communications, and Intelligence. The new name, Defense Treaty Inspection Readiness Program (DTIRP), reflected the expansion of DTIRP's mission to include DoD facilities, in addition to defense contractor facilities, and to include other arms control treaties and agreements in addition to START.

Although the scope of DTIRP's mission expanded, its focus remained the same:

To provide assistance in developing cost-effective countermeasures to protect national security, proprietary, and other critical information from being compromised or exploited during arms control inspection activities.

== See also ==
- Defense Threat Reduction Agency
