= Sin Son-ho =

North Korean diplomat (born 1948)

- Hangul: 신선호
- Hanja: 辛善虎
- RR: Sin Seonho
- MR: Sin Sŏnho

Sin Son-ho (Korean: 신선호; Korean pronunciation: [ɕin.sʌn.ɦo]; born July 5, 1948) is a North Korean diplomat who was North Korea's Permanent Representative to the United Nations from 2008 to February 2014, until he was replaced by Ja Song-nam. In his career as a diplomat, he has primarily represented North Korea in its relations with African countries.

== Diplomatic career ==
Sin graduated from Kim Il-sung University in 1972. That same year, he was appointed as Third Secretary to the North Korean embassy to Egypt, where he served until 1979. From 1979 to 1983, he was a senior officer in the Foreign Ministry, then, from 1983 to 1986, counsellor at the North Korean embassy to Lesotho. From 1986 to 1990, he was Division Chief at the Foreign Ministry, before serving as counsellor to the North Korean embassy in Zimbabwe from 1990 to 1995. From 1995 to 1999, he was Deputy-Director of the Foreign Ministry.

Sin's first appointment to the United Nations came in 1999, when he worked at the North Korean Mission to the United Nations for four years before returning home upon being appointed Director-General of the Foreign Ministry. He served in the latter position until May 2008, when he was appointed Permanent Representative to the United Nations.

In his latter role, Sin has been tasked with expressing North Korea's positions on the issue of his country's nuclear activities. In October 2008, Sin told a session of the General Assembly that North Korea had developed nuclear weapons in response to the threat it perceived from the United States, but that it had begun dismantling its nuclear apparatus and that it supported the "denuclearisation of the Korean peninsular".

Sin added that his country wished for a peace agreement to replace the 55-year-old Korean War armistice, and that North Korea hoped for the eventual reunification of Korea.

He has denied that North Korea has a human rights problem.

Diplomatic posts
Preceded by Pak Kil-yon	Permanent Representative to the United Nations; 2008–2014	Succeeded by Ja Song-nam
