= Kenneth A. Myers III =

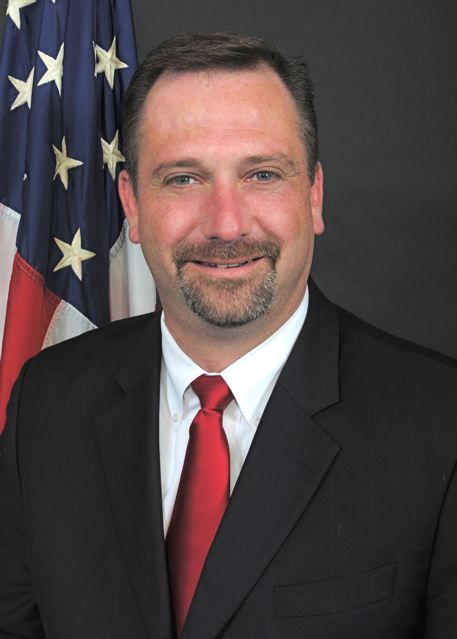

Kenneth A. Myers III was the fourth and longest serving director of the Defense Threat Reduction Agency (DTRA), from September 2009 to March 2016. DTRA is the intellectual, technical and operational leader for the Department of Defense (DoD) and the U.S. Strategic Command (USSTRATCOM) in the national effort to combat the weapons of mass destruction (WMD) threat. Myers was also dual-hatted as the director of the USSTRATCOM Center for Combating Weapons of Mass Destruction. The center integrates and synchronizes DoD-wide efforts in support of the combating WMD mission.

== Professional career ==
Starting in 1994, Myers was a senior associate at the law firm of Robinson Lake Sawyer Miller in Washington, D.C. He specialized in U.S. public and private sector investments to states of the former Soviet Union and was responsible for establishing the firm's office in Kyiv, Ukraine. Following his time in Kyiv, Myers accepted a position in the office of U.S. Senator Richard Lugar, where he served as a legislative assistant for National Security and Foreign Affairs. He assisted the senator in his role as a member of the Senate Select Committee on Intelligence, the Senate's National Security Working Group and Russia Working Group.

He joined the United States Senate Committee on Foreign Relations as a Senior Professional Staff Member in 2003 when Lugar became Chairman of the Committee. He served as the senior advisor to Lugar on European, former Soviet Union and Central Asian affairs.

Myers worked extensively on issues of nonproliferation, counter-proliferation, arms control, and arms sales. He played a vital role in the development of the Nunn-Lugar Cooperative Threat Reduction Program and the Lugar-Obama Cooperative Proliferation Detection, Interdiction Assistance, and Conventional Threat Reduction Act of 2006. Myers frequently traveled throughout Europe, Central Asia and Russia with Lugar, members of the U.S. Senate Committee on Foreign Relations, and then-Senator Barack Obama to champion the causes of the Nunn-Lugar Cooperative Threat Reduction Program.

Additionally, Myers played a leading role in numerous critical foreign policy debates as Senator Richard Lugar's point person on the enlargement of the North Atlantic Treaty Organization (NATO), the Moscow Treaty (the Treaty Between the United States of America and the Russian Federation on Strategic Offensive Reductions, or SORT), and the Strategic Arms Reduction Treaty (New START), U.S. nonproliferation and counter-proliferation policies, export controls and the U.S.-India Peaceful Atomic Energy Cooperation Act.

== Selected for DTRA ==
Myers was selected as the director of the Defense Threat Reduction Agency in the summer or 2009, was sworn in on July 27, 2009, at The Pentagon, and had an official Assumption of Responsibility Ceremony on September 1, 2009, at DTRA's headquarters on Fort Belvoir, Virginia. As DTRA Director, he oversaw an organization with approximately 2,000 civilian and military personnel at more than 14 locations around the world, including Russia, Kazakhstan, Azerbaijan, Uzbekistan, Georgia, and Ukraine.

== Education ==
Myers has a bachelor's degree from Virginia Polytechnic Institute and State University; he earned a Master of International Security degree from the Catholic University of America, where he concentrated on the break-up of the former Soviet Union.
