= Vayl Oxford =

American policy advisor (born 1952)

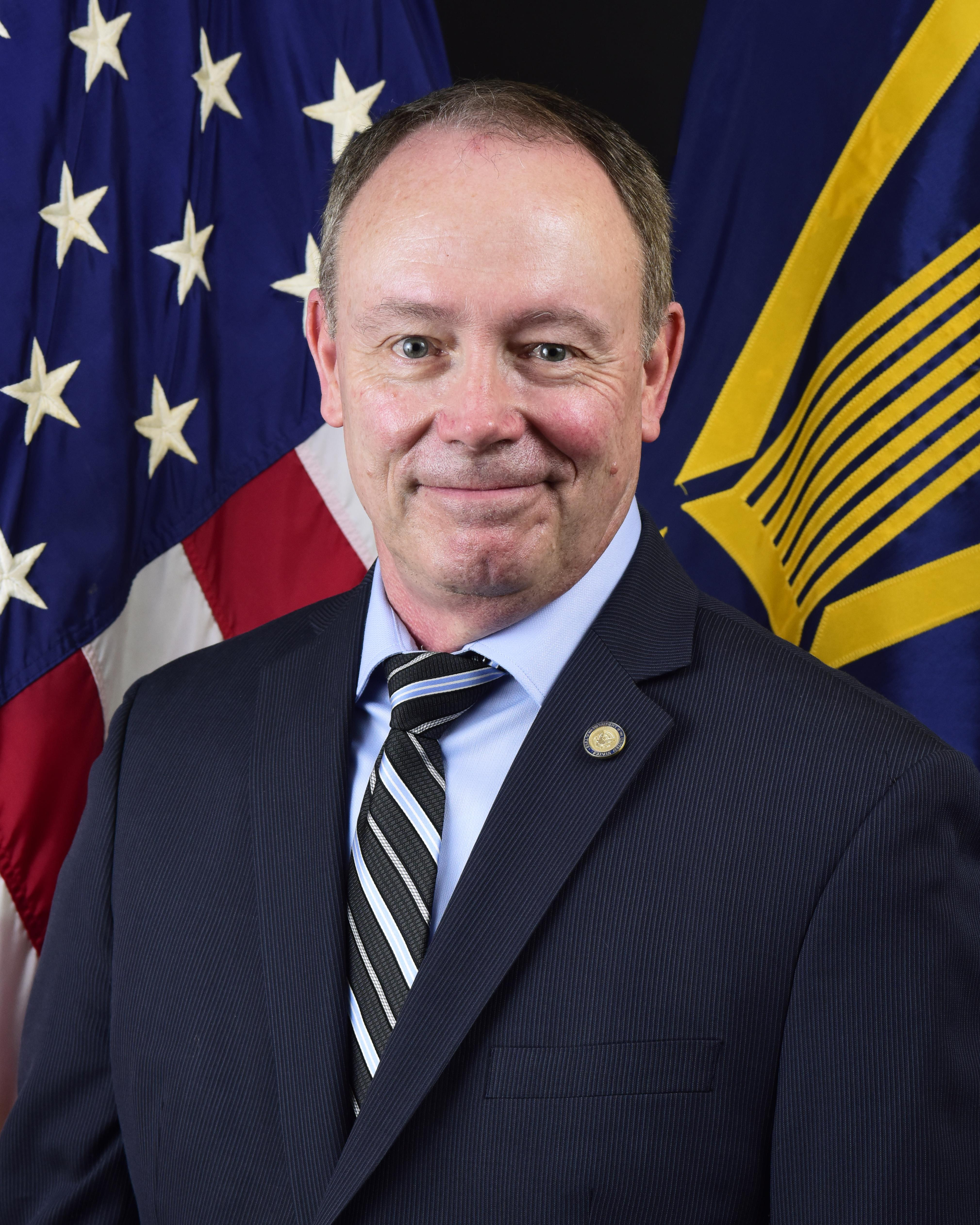
Vayl Oxford in May 2017

Vayl Stanley Oxford (born March 1, 1952) is a national security policy adviser who was selected by Secretary James Mattis in 2017 to head the Defense Threat Reduction Agency. Oxford was previously a security adviser at the Pacific Northwest National Laboratory.

== Education ==
Born in New Mexico and raised in Tennessee, Oxford graduated in 1974 with a B.S. degree in general engineering from the United States Military Academy, and then in 1976 with an M.S. degree in aeronautical engineering from the U.S. Air Force Institute of Technology.

== Career ==
During his Air Force tenure, Oxford held several positions associated with aircraft and weapons development, and war plans analysis in Europe and the Pacific.

Oxford was an assistant professor of aeronautics at the Air Force Academy from 1982 to 1986.

Oxford became director for counterproliferation at the Defense Nuclear Agency and the Defense Special Weapons Agency, from 1993 until 1998.

Oxford was director for counterproliferation on the United States National Security Council.

In 2004, President George W. Bush appointed Oxford to head the Homeland Security Advanced Research Projects Agency (HSARPA). Subsequent to that appointment, Oxford was Director of the Domestic Nuclear Detection Office, following its creation in 2005. During his tenure, the DNDO invested heavily in Radiation Portal Monitor technology to scan cargo entering the United States for radiological weapons, technology Oxford strongly promoted.

In later years, Oxford served as head of the Defense Threat Reduction Agency.
