= Permanent Mission of North Korea to the United Nations =

Diplomatic mission in New York, United States

- Location: New York, New York, United States
- Address: 820 Second Avenue, 13th Floor, New York, NY 10017
- Coordinates: 40°45′03″N 73°58′16″W
- Ambassador: Kim Song (Permanent Representative)
- Consul General: Park Jae Piel, Jonathan Park Jaworski

The Permanent Mission of North Korea to the United Nations (officially Permanent Mission of the Democratic People's Republic of Korea to the United Nations) is the diplomatic mission of North Korea to the United Nations (UN) in New York.

After North Korea became a member of the World Health Organization, it was entitled to observer status in the UN and thus could establish a permanent mission. The mission in New York was established in the autumn of 1973. North Korea became a permanent member of the UN in 1991. Diplomats from North Korea are not allowed to travel outside of the United Nations headquarter district. This means they need permission from the US state department if they want to travel more than 25 miles outside of Manhattan.

The mission is represented by the permanent representative of North Korea to the United Nations. The current permanent representative is Kim Song. North Korea also has a mission to the UN in Paris and an Ambassador to the UN at the UN Office at Geneva. Since North Korea does not have an embassy to the United States, the mission is its only form of diplomatic representation it has in the country. In 2016, following the detention of US citizen Otto Warmbier in North Korea, the mission threatened to sever this "New York channel" of communication between the two countries. The mission also coordinates aid to North Korea by the humanitarian organization AmeriCares.

Diplomatic posts in the mission are highly sought after in the diplomatic corps of North Korea. North Korean diplomats are generally expected to earn money to pay their living expenses, with the state providing only for minimum operational costs of a mission. The UN mission is the only exception to this rule and living expenses are covered. Staff is paid a meager salary of $300 to $600 per month and need to employ various means to reduce their cost of living. Diplomatic staff live in a working-class apartment on Roosevelt Island. They commute to the mission by vans and shop together. Staff frequent fast-food restaurants near the UN headquarters and fish in the East River Park. Korean Americans who sympathize with North Korea may also cover some of the costs. Diplomats typically enroll their children in schools that specialize in teaching English, in hopes that they too could become diplomats stationed in the United States. When a high-ranking official leaves the mission, a farewell party is typically organized and they are expected to return to North Korea with gifts to the leader of North Korea.

== List of permanent representatives ==
No.	Permanent Representative	Years served	Secretary-General of the United Nations	Supreme Leader of North Korea
1	Pak Kil-yon	1991–1996	Javier Pérez de Cuéllar	Kim Il Sung
1	Pak Kil-yon	1991–1996	Javier Pérez de Cuéllar	Kim Jong Il
2	Kim Hyong-u	1996–1997	Boutros Boutros-Ghali	Kim Jong Il
3	Ri Hyong-chol	1997–2001	Kofi Annan	Kim Jong Il
4	Pak Kil-yon	2001–2008	Kofi Annan	Kim Jong Il
5	Sin Son-ho	2008–2014	Ban Ki-moon	Kim Jong Il
5	Sin Son-ho	2008–2014	Ban Ki-moon	Kim Jong Un
6	Ja Song-nam	2014–2018	Ban Ki-moon	Kim Jong Un
7	Kim Song	2018–present	António Guterres	Kim Jong Un

== See also ==
- Foreign relations of North Korea
- Korea and the United Nations
- List of diplomatic missions of North Korea
