= Ken Myers (surgeon) =

Australian surgeon (1935–2021)

Kenneth Arthur Myers FRACS FACS (14 February 1935 – 3 March 2021) was an Australian surgeon specialising in phlebology.

== Early life and education ==
Myers was born in Melbourne, Australia on 14 February 1935 to parents Robert and Edith Myers. His father was a printer and his mother a music teacher. After obtaining a scholarship to Scotch College, he matriculated, aged 16, as one of the youngest students ever at the school, skipping a year, and achieving the highest score in his year in mathematics. He then went on to Melbourne University and graduated in 1957, later gaining his surgical qualifications in 1962.

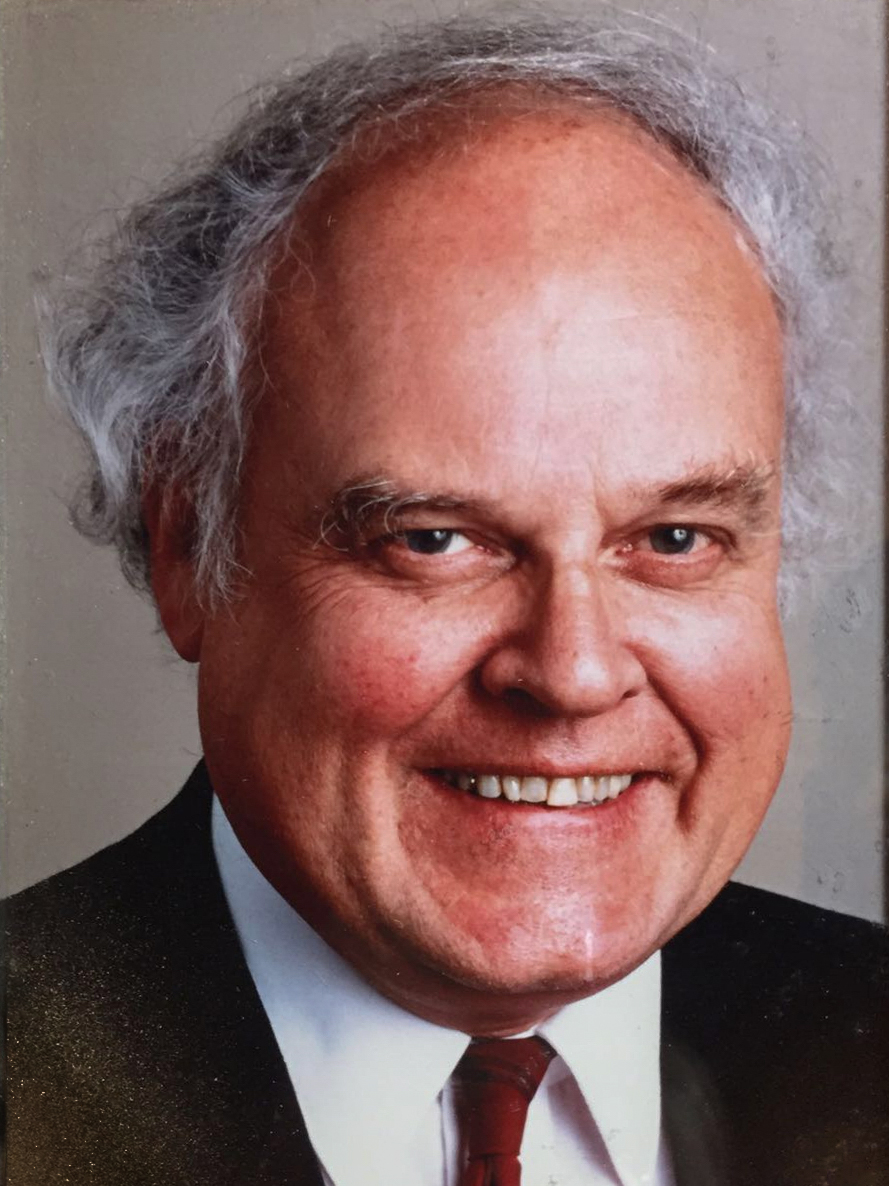
Portrait_of_Ken_Myers

== Career ==
Myers completed his surgical training through an internship at the Royal Melbourne Hospital and soon afterwards was invited to do a two-year surgical fellowship with the William Talbot Irvine at the academic surgical unit at St Mary’s Hospital in London. He then went on to do a one-year fellowship at the Presbyterian St Luke’s Hospital in Chicago. On return to Melbourne, he was appointed as Surgeon to Prince Henry’s Hospital and later to the Monash Medical Centre as Head of the Department of Vascular Surgery. He was also a Consultant Surgeon at Epworth Hospital.

In 1977 he was invited to be a guest lecturer at Oxford University and in 1985 also had a stint back at St Mary’s hospital in London as Associate Director at the Irvine Laboratory for Cardiovascular Investigation and Research.

Whilst working as a general vascular surgeon, Myers had a particular interest in venous disease and for the latter part of his practicing years worked exclusively as a phlebologist. He championed minimally invasive endovenous techniques, always embracing new technology with ease, and was responsible for introducing ultrasound-guided sclerotherapy as well as endovenous laser ablation into Australia. He was at the forefront of innovation in the field of phlebology in Australia and world-wide, introducing endovenous laser and radiofrequency ablation (EVLA) into Australia in 2001.

Paul Thibault, the founding President of the Australasian College of Phlebology says, "Ken was a giant in the field of phlebology and a unique surgeon in his ability to adopt new techniques when he had carefully analysed them and come to the conclusion, they had merit." Myers was elected chancellor of the Australasian College of Phlebology in 2007, a position he held until 2017. Myers was also President of the Australian and New Zealand Societies for Vascular Surgery and Phlebology as well as Honorary Member of the American College of Phlebology.

Myers was a prolific author of over 200 scientific papers and textbooks on arterial surgery, vascular ultrasound and venous and lymphatic diseases and contributed to many medical guideline and consensus documents.

Myers also enjoyed educating students and was Dean of the Prince Henry’s Medical School, Lecturer of Surgery at the University of Melbourne as well as Clinical Professor at the Department of Surgery at Monash University. At the Melbourne Union of International Phlebologists 2018 congress, he was awarded a Lifetime Achievement Award from the Australasian College of Phlebology.

He died on 3 March 2021, at Epworth Hospital in Melbourne, Australia.

=== Bibliography ===
- Principles of Pathology in Surgery (1980) by K. A. Myers, R. D. Marshall, and J. Freidin; foreword by Lord Smith; illustrated by J. Freidin (Oxford : Blackwell Scientific, ISBN 0632004134)
- Making Sense of Vascular Ultrasound: A hands-on guide (2005) by Kenneth Myers and Amy Clough
- Practical Vascular Ultrasound: An Illustrated Guide (2014) by Kenneth Myers and Amy May Clough
- Manual of Venous and Lymphatic Diseases (2018) edited by Kenneth Myers and Paul Hannah
- A History of the Circulation: In Health and Disease (2019) by Kenneth Myers
- Australian Impressionism (2020) by Kenneth Myers
