= Ja Song-nam =

North Korean diplomat (born 1954)

Permanent Representative to the United Nations
- In office February 2014 – 2018
- Preceded by: Sin Son-ho
- Succeeded by: Kim Song

Personal details
- Born: March 28, 1954 (age 72) Taedong County, South Pyongan Province, North Korea
- Education: Pyongyang University of Foreign Studies
- Occupation: Diplomat

- Ja Song-nam
- Hangul: 자성남
- Hanja: 慈成男
- RR: Ja Seongnam
- MR: Cha Sŏngnam

Ja Song-nam (Korean: 자성남, born 28 March 1954) is a North Korean diplomat. Ja was North Korea's Permanent Representative to the United Nations between February 2014 and 2018. Between 2006 and 2011, he served as North Korean Ambassador to the United Kingdom.

== Early life and career ==
Ja Song-nam was born on 28 March 1954.

Ja graduated from the Pyongyang University of Foreign Studies in 1983. He then served as the Director-General of the Department for National Reunification Affairs and Director of the Institute for Disarmament and Peace of the Foreign Ministry of North Korea from 2005 to 2006. He was a Senior Researcher in the Ministry from 2004 to 2005. He was a Counsellor at his country's Permanent Mission to the United Nations in New York from 2000 to 2004. Between 2006 and 2011, he served as North Korean Ambassador to the United Kingdom.

Ja became North Korea's Permanent Representative to the United Nations in February 2014, replacing Sin Son-ho. He continued in that post until he was replaced by Kim Song in 2018.

== Personal life ==
Ja is married and has children.

Diplomatic posts
Preceded by Ri Yong-ho	North Korean Ambassador to the United Kingdom; 2006–2011	Succeeded by Hyon Hak-bong
Preceded by Sin Son-ho	Permanent Representative to the United Nations; 2014–2018	Succeeded by Kim Song
