= Hyon Hak-bong =

North Korean ambassador

- Korean: 현학봉
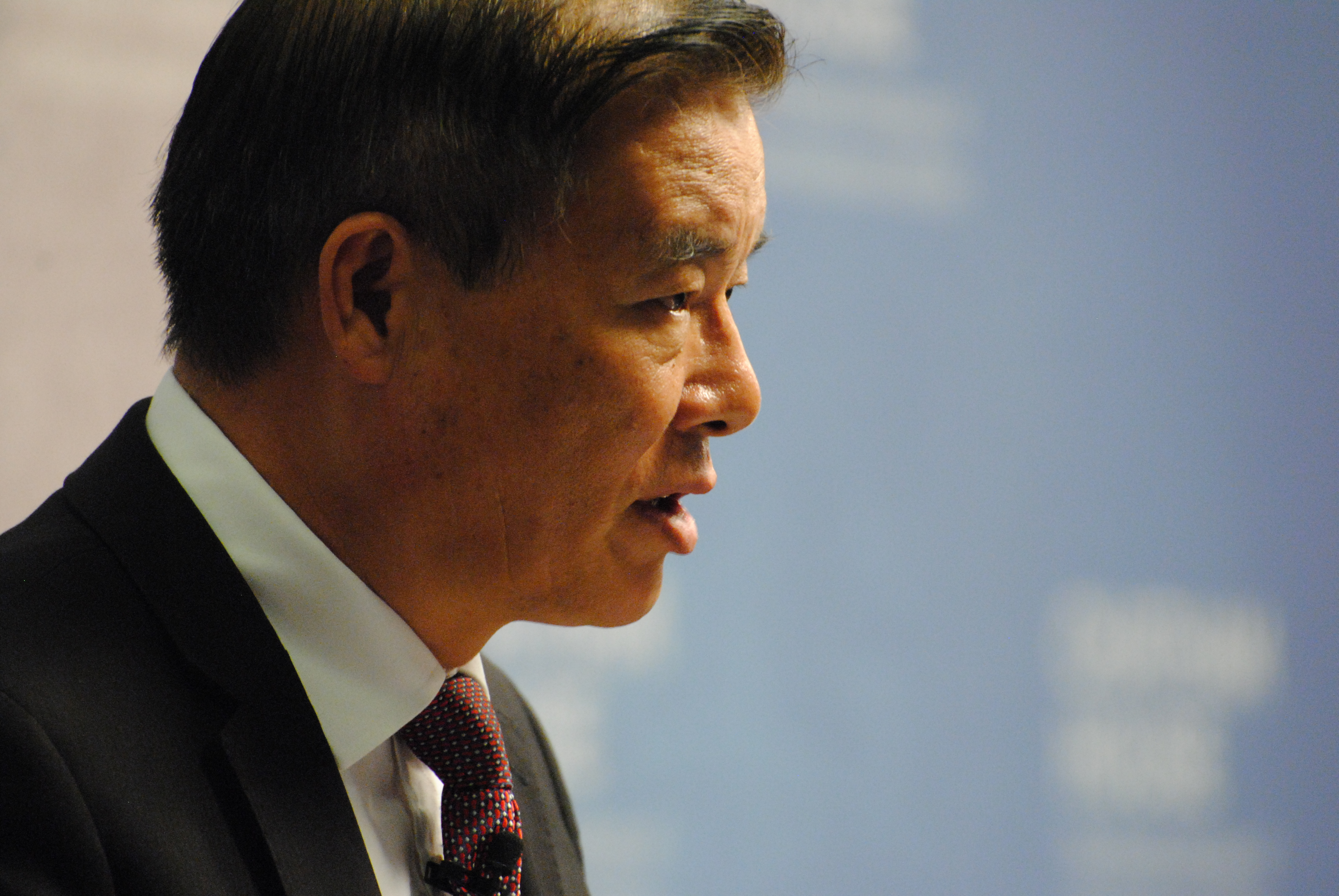
- Hyon Hak-bong speaking at Chatham House in 2015

North Korean Ambassador to the United Kingdom
- In office 2011 – 25 August 2016
- Preceded by: Ja Song-nam
- Succeeded by: Choe Il

Personal details
- Spouse: Choe Jin-ok

Hyon Hak-bong (Korean: 현학봉; Korean pronunciation: [hjʌn.ɦak̚.p͈oŋ] or [hjʌn] [hak̚.p͈oŋ]) is the former North Korean Ambassador to the United Kingdom. He was based at the Embassy of North Korea, London. In 2016, he was interviewed about North Korea's nuclear weapons policy. He is married to Choe Jin-ok. He is reported to have been an ally of the late Jang Song-thaek.

As of 25 August 2016, Hyon is reported to have been recalled to North Korea following the defection of the former deputy ambassador Thae Yong-ho.

Diplomatic posts
Preceded by Ja Song-nam	North Korean Ambassador to the United Kingdom; 2011–2016	Succeeded by Choe Il
