= Transparency in Armaments =

Transparency in Armaments (TIA) is an arms control reporting program established by the United Nations General Assembly on December 9, 1991, under UN resolution 46/36L. It calls for annual reporting by UN member states on imports, exports, and holdings of weapons in seven categories: battle tanks; armored combat vehicles; large caliber artillery systems; attack helicopters; combat aircraft; warships; and missiles and missile launchers. Reporting is not required but is strongly encouraged. Reports are sent to the Secretary General of the United Nations and are maintained in the United Nations Conventional Arms Register (UNCAR).

Reporting has not been consistent. At least 170 member states and three non-member states have reported at least once since reporting began. However, in 2010, only 72 national reports were received. The highest rate of compliance is by nations that are members of the Organization for Security and Co-operation in Europe (OSCE), because the data required by TIA is comparable to that required by other OSCE arms control initiatives.
