= Trudy H. Clark =

US Air Force general

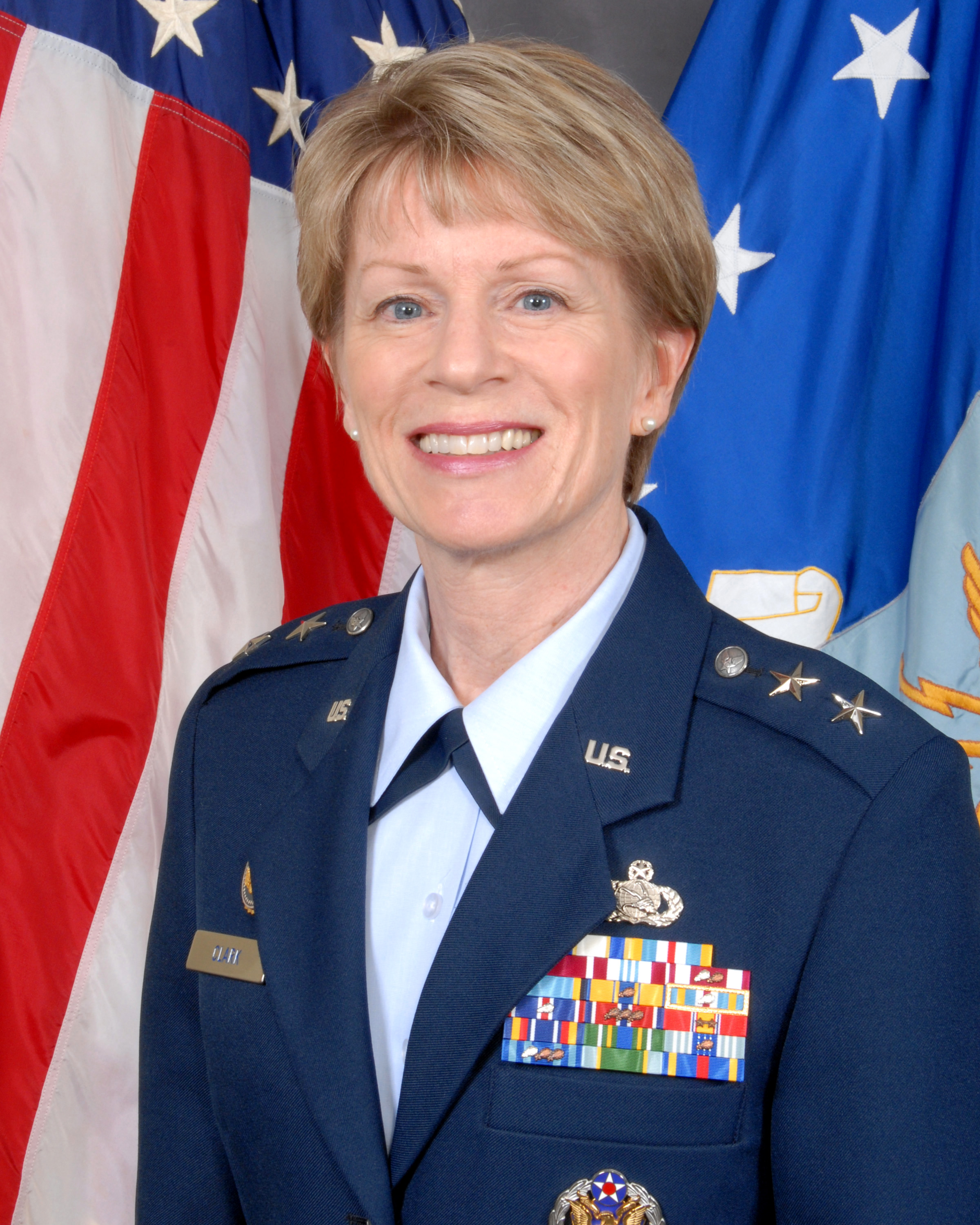
- Born: 1951 (age 74–75)
- Military career
- Allegiance: United States
- Branch: United States Air Force
- Service years: 1973 – 2006
- Rank: Major General
- Commands: 17th Support Group; 60th Communications Group
- Awards: Air Force Distinguished Service Medal; Defense Superior Service Medal; Legion of Merit; Defense Meritorious Service Medal; Meritorious Service Medal (7); Aerial Achievement Medal; Air Force Commendation Medal (2); National Defense Service Medal (3); Global War on Terrorism Service Medal; Korea Defense Service Medal

Major General Trudy H. Clark, USAF (retired) is a former Deputy Director of the Defense Threat Reduction Agency (DTRA) in Fort Belvoir, Virginia in the United States.

== Military career ==
Clark received her commission in 1973 as a distinguished graduate of Officer Training School. From her commissioning until 1984, she served as chief of communications branches at various Air Force bases in the United States and in Turkey and South Korea. In July 1984, she was assigned as commander of the 1880th Information Systems Squadron at the Tonopah Test Range, Nev. She then completed Air Command and Staff College before taking her assignment as chief of Tactical Command and Control Communication Systems, and later executive officer for the Deputy Director of Programs and Evaluation at U.S. Air Force Headquarters, Washington, D.C., in 1989. While in Washington, she was assigned as commander of the Staff Support Unit, and presidential communications officer in the White House Communications Agency. In 1992, she left Washington to attend Armed Forces Staff College and the Air War College.

After completing the Air War College, she was assigned to Travis Air Force Base, Calif., where she served as commander of the 60th Communications Group, chief of the Communications Division and commander of the 615th Air Mobility Communications Squadron. In 1995, Clark was named commander of the 17th Support Group, Goodfellow Air Force Base, Texas, before returning to Washington, D.C., as executive officer to the Air Force Chief of Staff. In 1997, she was named commandant of the Squadron Officer School at Maxwell Air Force Base in Alabama. She served there for two years before being named director for Command, Control, Communications and Computer Systems at U.S. Strategic Command, Offutt Air Force Base, Neb.

Prior to assuming her current duties, Clark was the deputy chief information officer (CIO), Headquarters U.S. Air Force, Washington, D.C. There, she assisted the CIO in leading the Air Force in creating and enforcing information technology standards, in promoting and shaping effective strategic and operational Information Technology (IT) planning processes, and in acquiring IT systems. The general worked with other Air Force leaders to ensure that IT processes were efficient and effective in meeting the needs of the Air Force.

Clark was promoted to major general on March 1, 2003. Major General Clark retired from the USAF on December 1, 2006.

== Education ==
1972 Bachelor of arts degree in sociology, with honors, University of Maryland where she became a member of Pi Beta Phi
1980 Distinguished graduate, Squadron Officer School, Maxwell AFB, Alabama
1987 Master of science degree in guidance and counseling, Troy State University, Montgomery, Alabama
1987 Air Command and Staff College, Maxwell AFB, Alabama
1992 Armed Forces Staff College, Norfolk, Virginia
1993 Air War College, Maxwell AFB, Alabama
2001 Senior Information Warfare Applications Course, Maxwell AFB, Alabama
2002 National Security Leadership Course, Syracuse University, Syracuse, New York
2003 National Security Decision-Making Seminar, School of Advanced International Studies, Johns Hopkins University, Washington, D.C.
2004 U.S. - Russia Executive Security Program, John F. Kennedy School of Government, Harvard University, Cambridge, Mass.

== Assignments ==
1. September 1973 - July 1974, student, Communications-Electronics Officer School, Keesler AFB, Mississippi
2. July 1974 - September 1976, Chief of Telephone Installations, 392nd Communications Group, Vandenberg Air Force Base, Calif.
3. September 1976 - January 1979, Chief, Programs Management Division, 2006th Communications Group, Incirlik Air Base, Turkey
4. January 1979 - July 1981, Chief, Communication Branch, Joint Studies Group, later, Chief of Threats Analysis, 4440th Tactical Fighter Training Group, Red Flag, Nellis AFB, Nev.
5. July 1981 - August 1982, Chief, Facilities Operation Branch, 2146th Communications Group, Osan Air Base, South Korea
6. August 1982 - July 1984, Chief, Telecommunications Division and Executive Officer, Headquarters Tactical Communications Division, Langley AFB, Va.
7. July 1984 - July 1986, Commander, 1880th Information Systems Squadron, Tonopah Test Range, Nev.
8. August 1986 - June 1987, student, Air Command and Staff College, Maxwell AFB, Ala.
9. June 1987 - August 1989, Chief of Tactical Command and Control Communication Systems, Directorate of Programs and Evaluation, later, Executive Officer for the Deputy Director of Programs and Evaluation, Headquarters U.S. Air Force, Washington, D.C.
10. August 1989 - April 1992, Commander, Staff Support Unit, and Presidential Communications Officer, White House Communications Agency, Washington, D.C.
11. April 1992 - July 1992, student, Armed Forces Staff College, Norfolk, Va.
12. August 1992 - June 1993, student, Air War College, Maxwell AFB, Ala.
13. June 1993 - July 1994, Commander, 60th Communications Group, and Chief, Communications Division, Headquarters 15th Air Force, Travis AFB, Calif.
14. July 1994 - April 1995, Chief, Communications Division, Headquarters 15th Air Force, and Commander, 615th Air Mobility Communications Squadron, Travis AFB, Calif.
15. April 1995 - June 1996, Commander, 17th Support Group, Goodfellow Air Force Base, Texas
16. June 1996 - November 1997, Executive Officer to the Air Force Chief of Staff, Headquarters U.S. Air Force, Washington, D.C.
17. November 1997 - August 1999, Commandant, Squadron Officer School, Maxwell AFB, Ala.
18. August 1999 - September 2001, Director for Command, Control, Communications and Computer Systems, U.S. Strategic Command, Offutt AFB, Neb.
19. September 2001 - May 2003, Deputy Chief Information Officer, Headquarters U.S. Air Force, Washington, D.C.
20. June 2003 - December 2006, Deputy Director, Defense Threat Reduction Agency, Fort Belvoir, Va.

== Awards and decorations ==
Master Communications and Information Badge

Air Force Distinguished Service Medal
Defense Superior Service Medal
Legion of Merit
Defense Meritorious Service Medal
Meritorious Service Medal with silver and bronze oak leaf clusters
Aerial Achievement Medal
Air Force Commendation Medal with bronze oak leaf cluster
Joint Meritorious Unit Award with silver oak leaf cluster
Air Force Outstanding Unit Award with silver oak leaf cluster
Air Force Organizational Excellence Award with three bronze oak leaf cluster
National Defense Service Medal with two bronze service stars
Global War on Terrorism Service Medal
Korea Defense Service Medal
Air Force Overseas Short Tour Service Ribbon with bronze oak leaf cluster
Air Force Longevity Service Award with silver and two bronze oak leaf clusters
Small Arms Expert Marksmanship Ribbon
Air Force Training Ribbon

== Effective dates of promotion ==
Promotions
Insignia	Rank	Date
	Major General	March 1, 2003
	Brigadier General	August 1, 1999
	Colonel	February 1, 1994
	Lieutenant Colonel	December 1, 1989
	Major	March 1, 1985
	Captain	September 26, 1977
	First Lieutenant	September 26, 1975
	Second Lieutenant	September 26, 1973
