= Joseph DeTrani =

American diplomat

Joseph R. DeTrani

United States Ambassador to Six-Party Talks
- President: Bill Clinton; George W. Bush; Barack Obama

Personal details
- Education: New York University School of Law, New York University; Harvard University
- Occupation: Professor, Diplomat, Intelligence Officer
- Known for: Director of the ODNI National Counter Proliferation Center and the US Intelligence Community Mission Manager for North Korea

Military service
- Branch/service: US Air Force

Joseph DeTrani is a retired American Central Intelligence Agency (CIA) officer and diplomat. An expert in Asian policy, he served as a long-tenured negotiator between the United States and the North Korean government as part of the Six-Party Talks.

== Biography ==
DeTrani graduated New York University with a degree win Economics in 1962. He then attended NYU Law, completing the program in 1965. He served as an officer in the U.S. Air Force and received a Certificate in Chinese from the State Department Foreign Language School in Taiwan.

DeTrani is fluent in Mandarin Chinese and is a member of the Council on Foreign Relations.

== Career ==
After leaving the Air Force, DeTrani began work for the Central Intelligence Agency (CIA). Throughout the course of his career, he served as Director of East Asia Operations, Director for European Operations, Director of Technical Services, Director of Public Affairs, Director of the Crime and Narcotics Center, and Executive Assistant to the Director of Central Intelligence William J. Casey.

From 1997 to 1999, he served as the Minister Counselor at the U.S. Embassy in Beijing. The following year, he served as the Director of the Crime and Narcotics Center at CIA as well as a Commissioner, U.S. Port Security Commission. DeTrani was a member of the Senior Executive Service and his overseas assignments at the CIA sent him to Afghanistan, East Asia and China.

From 2003 to 2006, he served at the Department of State as the Special Envoy for Six-Party Talks with North Korea, with the rank of Ambassador, and as the U.S. Representative to the Korea Energy Development Organization (KEDO).

In 2006, DeTrani joined the Office of the Director of National Intelligence, where he served at the Senior Advisor to the Director of National Intelligence and the Director of the National Counter Proliferation Center and the Intelligence Community Mission Manager for North Korea.

In 2013, DeTrani was named president of the Intelligence and National Security Alliance (INSA), a trade association for intelligence professionals and industry partners.

Following his departure from INSA, he served as the Board of Managers at Sandia National Laboratories. DeTrani is the recipient of awards including the Donovan Award, the Distinguished Intelligence Medal and the Commandant’s Award.
