= National Counterproliferation and Biosecurity Center =

Mission center of the United States Intelligence Community

Coordinates: 38.933°N 77.205°W

- NCBC
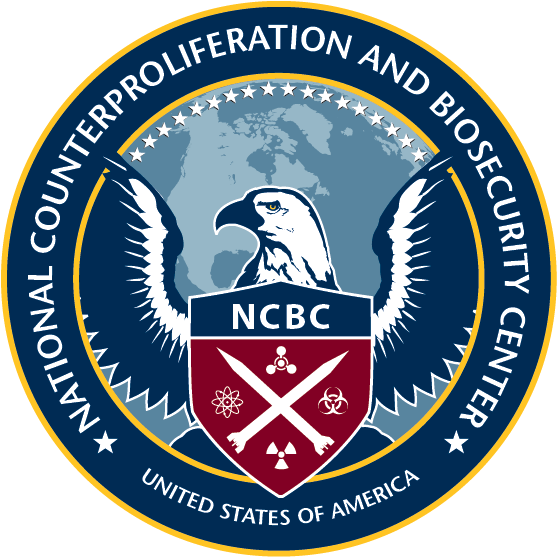

Agency overview
- Formed: 2004
- Dissolved: 2025
- Headquarters
- Agency executive: Dr. Kathryn Brinsfield, Director
- Parent agency: Office of the Director of National Intelligence
- Website: https://archive.dni.gov/index.php/ncbc-home (self-archived)

The National Counterproliferation and Biosecurity Center (NCBC), dissolved 2025 (previously known as the National Counterproliferation Center (NCPC) from 2004 to 2022) was the primary organization within the United States Intelligence Community for combating the spread of weapons of mass destruction and their delivery systems.

NCBC works with the United States Intelligence Community (IC) to identify critical intelligence gaps in counterproliferation collection or analysis and then develops solutions to help close those gaps. NCBC also works to find and fund new technologies to help combat proliferation. Additionally, NCBC works to identify "over the horizon" proliferation concerns and creates strategies to ensure that the IC is well-positioned to address them.

== History ==
In 2004, then-Senate Majority Leader Bill Frist proposed a National Counterproliferation Center (NCPC), noting that, "The greatest threat facing our country today is not solely a terrorist, but a terrorist armed with a weapon of mass destruction."

He noted that a Center was needed "to focus, clarify and coordinate" U.S. efforts to stop the spread of chemical, biological and nuclear arms and missiles. Frist continued: "The bottom line is this: Just as we must take the offensive in the global war on terrorism, we must similarly take the offensive in stopping the proliferation of weapons of mass destruction. We need a good offense, and counterproliferation is just the answer.

At its founding, then-Director of National Intelligence John Negroponte noted that, "NCPC will enhance our country's ability to prevent terrorists or terrorist-related entities from acquiring" weapon of mass destruction.

The Intelligence Authorization Act (IAA) for Fiscal Year (FY) 2022, enacted by Congress, changed the name of the National Counterproliferation Center to the "National Counterproliferation and Biosecurity Center" to fit with its new biosecurity responsibilities.

In August 2025, Director of National Intelligence Tulsi Gabbard under the second presidency of Donald Trump announced plan to dissolve NCBC, allegedly adding their functions into other offices within the Office of the Director of National Intelligence.

== Scope and initiatives ==
NCPC Funding of Counterproliferation Technologies

Shortly after its 2004 founding, NCPC established a fund to foster the development of innovative, counterproliferation technologies. It has been estimated that the fund "is in the low tens of millions."

According to a former Office of the Director of National Intelligence budget official, "[The fund will] be seed money" that NCPC can focus toward worthwhile, cutting edge counterproliferation projects across the Intelligence Community.

Counterproliferation Reserve Corps

In a 2008 speech by Principal Deputy Director of National Intelligence Donald Kerr, "Our National Counterproliferation Center is trying to lead the way in developing a plan to have a Counterproliferation Reserve Corps. It's really an adjunct to the Intelligence Reserve Corps that we already have, but we're really trying to bring these people back in a way that we can get another ten years or so out of their accumulated knowledge. It's going to be very important not just in the proliferation area. I think there are a number of others where we're going to have that same issue."

Advisory Committee on Bioterrorism

In 2006, it was announced that NCPC had formed a committee of medical experts to collaborate with the Intelligence Community on biological threats. According to NCPC Director Kenneth C. Brill, "While such a pandemic would be largely dealt with by those U.S. government agencies concerned with domestic and international public health issues, the Intelligence Community would be looked to for actionable medical intelligence about the spread of pandemic diseases that would not be available publicly."

The Biological Sciences Experts Group (BSEG) is an advisory panel of non-governmental life sciences experts under the National Counterproliferation Center (NCPC) within the ODNI. Formed in 2010, it provides independent scientific advice on bioweapons proliferation, emerging biotechnologies, and biosecurity, assisting with experimental design and data interpretation without engaging in intelligence production. Comprising ~12 specialists, BSEG supports NCPC's classified assessments—including early COVID-19 origins discussions—and has been urged to adopt broader sociotechnical perspectives.

NCPC received praise for this effort in the Report of the Commission on the Prevention of WMD Proliferation and Terrorism, which noted that, "NCPC also reaches out to elements inside and outside the U.S. government to identify new methods or technologies that can enhance the intelligence community's capability to detect and defeat future proliferation threats."

== Leadership ==
Director

- Ambassador Kenneth C. Brill (2005–2009)
- Ambassador Joseph DeTrani (2010–2012)
- Maja M. Lehnus (2012–?)
- Annette L. Totten (2017-2019)
- Alan MacDougall (2020-2021)
- Doctor Kathryn Brinsfield, (2022–present)

Principal Deputy Director

- Robert Walpole (2005–present)
- Annette L. Totten (2015-2017)
- Alan MacDougall (2018-2019)
