= Songdowon International Children's Camp =

Summer camp school in North Korea

- 송도원국제소년단야영소
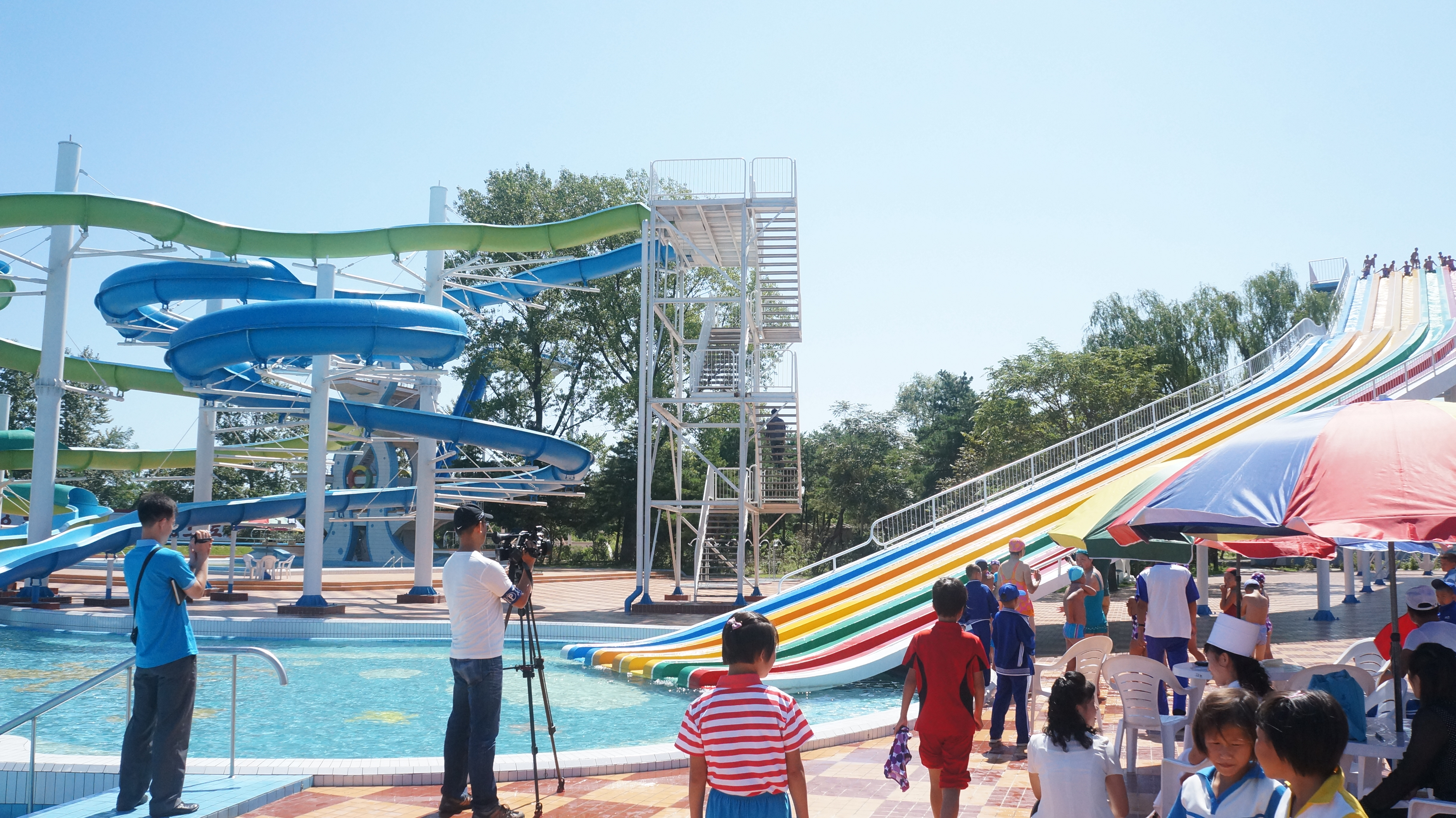

Location
- Wonsan, North Korea
- 39.187197°N 127.407420°E

Information
- Type: Summer camp
- Established: 1960
- Gender: Co-educational
- Age range: 7–16
- Language: Korean

The Songdowon International Children's Camp (Korean: 송도원국제소년단야영소) is a summer camp located in the Songdowon area (송도원; 松濤園) of Wonsan, North Korea.

== History ==
The area where the camp is located was considered a scenic spot already during the Japanese rule of Korea. On May 28, 1923, the Wonsan Beach Co., Ltd. was established by the Japanese, and auxiliary facilities such as a golf course and a hotel were later built. At that time, the establishment of the company was sponsored by the South Manchuria Railway. The camp itself established in 1960 under the name Songdowon Central Boys Camp, and was reorganized under its current name in 1985, with two reconstructions in 1993 and 2014. On September 23, 2014, the Songdowon Line and Songdowon Station, a railway connecting the campsite, were newly established, and trains are operating between Pyongyang-Songdowon, Chongjin Youth-Songdowon, and Haeju Youth-Songdowon.

In December 2025 Ukrainian human rights lawyers reported that at least two Ukrainian children had been deported to the camp during the Russian Invasion of Ukraine.

== Overview ==
The camp hosts around 400 international children annually. It underwent major renovations in 2014, increasing its maximum capacity to 1200 children. It offers various activities, including a water park, a football pitch, and a large private beach area. The camp's exterior features dormitories, recreational buildings, a gym, an aquarium where campers can learn about flora and fauna, a history of birds, and a display room for taxidermy animals. It also has a well-equipped cooking practice room so that children can learn to cook various foods on their own. The camp's main events include cultural exchanges between countries, where students perform culturally relevant songs and dances.

Other classes offered at the camp include cooking, boating, football, various educational classes, camping, video games, and other sports. The cost for international children is approximately US$300 per week. During the Cold War it used to host children from Communist bloc countries.
