= List of highest civilian awards by country =

This list of highest civilian awards is an index to articles that describe the highest civilian award given by each country in the world.

Country	Ribbon	Image	Name	Date first awarded	Number awarded	Notes	Ref.
Abkhazia			Order of Honour and Glory			See also: Orders, decorations, and medals of Abkhazia First Class is the highest grade of the order. Hero of Abkhazia is the highest civilian title awarded in Abkhazia	
Albania			Honour of the Nation Decoration	2006		See also: Orders, decorations, and medals of Albania	
Algeria			National Order of Merit	1992		See also: Orders, decorations, and medals of Algeria	
Andorra			Cross of the Seven Arms	2022		See also: Orders, decorations, and medals of Andorra	
Angola			Order of the National Hero				
Antigua and Barbuda			Order of the National Hero				
Argentina			Order of the Liberator General San Martín	1943	List	See also: Orders, decorations, and medals of Argentina Collar is the highest grade of the order.	
Armenia			Order of Glory			See also: Orders, decorations, and medals of Armenia National Hero of Armenia is the highest civilian title awarded in Armenia.	
Australia			Order of Australia	1975	List	See also: Orders, decorations, and medals of Australia Companion is the highest grade of the order.	
Austria			Decoration of Honour for Services to the Republic of Austria	1926		See also: Orders, decorations, and medals of Austria Grand Star is the highest grade of the order.	
Azerbaijan			Heydar Aliyev Order	2005	23	See also: Orders, decorations, and medals of Azerbaijan Hero of the Patriotic War is the highest civilian title awarded in Azerbaijan.	
Bahamas, The			Order of the National Hero				
Bahrain			Order of Sheikh Isa bin Salman Al Khalifa			Premium Class is the highest grade of the order.	
Bangladesh			Independence Award	1977		See also: Orders, decorations, and medals of Bangladesh	
Barbados			Order of National Heroes	1998	11	See also: Orders, decorations, and medals of Barbados	
Belarus			Order of the Fatherland			See also: Orders, decorations, and medals of Belarus First Class is the highest grade of the order. Hero of Belarus is the highest civilian title awarded in Belarus.	
Belgium			Order of Leopold		List	See also: Orders, decorations, and medals of Belgium Grand Cordon is the highest grade of the order.	
Belize			Order of the National Hero	2000	3		
Benin			National Order of Benin			Grand Cross is the highest grade of the order.	
Bhutan			Order of the Dragon King			First Class is the highest grade of the order.	
Bolivia			Order of the Condor of the Andes			Grand Collar is the highest grade of the order.	
Bosnia and Herzegovina			Order of Freedom	1994		See also: Orders, decorations, and medals of Bosnia and Herzegovina	
Botswana			Presidential Order of Botswana			See also: Orders, decorations, and medals of Botswana	
Brazil			Order of the Southern Cross	1822		See also: Orders, decorations, and medals of Brazil Grand Collar is the highest grade of the order.	
Brunei			Royal Family Order of the Crown of Brunei			See also: Orders, decorations, and medals of Brunei	
Bulgaria			Order of Stara Planina			See also: Orders, decorations, and medals of Bulgaria	
Burkina Faso			Order of the Stallion			Grand Commander is the highest grade of the order.	
Burundi			National Order of the Republic			See also: Orders, decorations, and medals of Burundi Grand Cordon is the highest grade of the order.	
Cambodia			Grand Order of National Merit	1996	5	See also: Orders, decorations, and medals of Cambodia	
Cameroon			Order of Valour			See also: Orders, decorations, and medals of Cameroon Grand Cordon is the highest grade of the order.	
Canada			Order of Canada	1967	List	See also: Orders, decorations, and medals of Canada Companion is the highest grade of the order.	
Cape Verde			Order of Amílcar Cabral			First Class is the highest grade of the order.	
Central African Republic			Order of Central African Merit			Grand Cross is the highest grade of the order.	
Chad			National Order of Chad			Grand Cross is the highest grade of the order.	
Chile			Order of Merit			See also: Orders, decorations, and medals of Chile Collar is the highest grade of the order.	
China			Friendship Medal	2018	10	See also: Orders, decorations, and medals of China Both medals are the joint-highest civilian awards of China.	
China			Medal of the Republic	2019	9	See also: Orders, decorations, and medals of China Both medals are the joint-highest civilian awards of China.	
Colombia			Order of Boyacá			Grand Collar is the highest grade of the order.	
Comoros			Order of the Green Crescent of Comoros			Commander is the highest grade of the order.	
Congo, Democratic Republic of the			Order of the National Heroes Kabila-Lumumba			See also: Orders, decorations, and medals of the Democratic Republic of the Congo Grand Cordan is the highest grade of the order.	
Congo, Republic of			Order of Merit			Knight is the highest grade of the order.	
Costa Rica			Beneméritos de la Patria			National Hero of Costa Rica is the highest civilian title awarded in Costa Rica.	
Croatia			Grand Order of King Tomislav			See also: Orders, decorations, and medals of Croatia	
Cuba			Order of José Martí			See also: Orders, decorations, and medals of Cuba Hero of the Republic of Cuba is the highest civilian title awarded in Cuba.	
Cyprus			Order of Makarios III			Grand Collar is the highest grade of the order.	
Czech Republic			Order of the White Lion			See also: Orders, decorations, and medals of the Czech Republic Grand Cross is the highest grade of the order.	
Denmark			Order of the Elephant	1693	List	See also: Orders, decorations, and medals of Denmark	
Djibouti			National Independence Order of June 27th			Commander is the highest grade of the order.	
Dominica			Dominica Award of Honour				
Dominican Republic			Order of Merit of Duarte, Sánchez and Mella			See also: Orders, decorations, and medals of the Dominican Republic Collar is the highest grade of the order.	
Ecuador			National Order of San Lorenzo			Grand Cordon is the highest grade of the order.	
Egypt			Order of the Nile	1915		See also: Orders, decorations, and medals of Egypt Grand Cordon is the highest grade of the order.	
El Salvador			Grand Order of Francisco Morazán	2021			
Equatorial Guinea			National Order of Equatorial Guinea			Grand Collar is the highest grade of the order.	
Estonia			Order of the National Coat of Arms			See also: Orders, decorations, and medals of Estonia First Class is the highest grade of the order.	
Eswatini			Royal Order of King Sobuzha II			See also: Orders, decorations, and medals of Eswatini Grand Master is the highest grade of the order.	
Ethiopia			Great Honour Nishan of Ethiopia			See also: Orders, decorations, and medals of Ethiopia	
Fiji			Order of Fiji			See also: Orders, decorations, and medals of Fiji Companion is the highest grade of the order.	
Finland			Order of the White Rose of Finland	1919	List	See also: Orders, decorations, and medals of Finland Grand Cross with Collar is the highest grade of the order.	
France			Legion of Honour	1804		See also: Orders, decorations, and medals of France Grand Cross is the highest grade of the order.	
Gabon			Order of the Equatorial Star			Grand Cross is the highest grade of the order.	
Gambia, The			Order of the Republic of the Gambia			Grand Commander is the highest grade of the order.	
Georgia			Order of the National Hero	2004		See also: Orders, decorations, and medals of Georgia	
Germany			Order of Merit of the Federal Republic of Germany		List	See also: Orders, decorations, and medals of the Federal Republic of Germany Grand Cross Special Class is the highest grade of the order.	
Ghana			Grand Order of the Star and Eagles of Ghana			See also: Orders, decorations, and medals of Ghana Awarded only to the persons who have been appointed President of Ghana.	
Greece			Order of the Redeemer			See also: Orders, decorations, and medals of Greece Grand Cross is the highest grade of the order.	
Grenada			Order of the National Hero				
Guatemala			Order of the Quetzal			Collar is the highest grade of the order.	
Guinea			National Order of Merit			Grand Cross is the highest grade of the order.	
Guinea-Bissau			Amílcar Cabral Medal				
Guyana			Order of Excellence of Guyana			See also: Orders, decorations, and medals of Guyana	
Haiti			National Order of Honour and Merit			Grand Cross is the highest grade of the order.	
Honduras			Order of Santa Rosa and the Civilization				
Hungary			Hungarian Order of Saint Stephen	2013		See also: Orders, decorations, and medals of Hungary	
Iceland			Order of the Falcon			Collar with Grand Cross Breast Star is the highest grade of the order.	
India			Bharat Ratna	1954	53	See also: Orders, decorations, and medals of India	
Indonesia			Star of the Republic of Indonesia			See also: Orders, decorations, and medals of Indonesia First Class is the highest grade of the order. National Hero of Indonesia is the highest civilian title awarded in Indonesia.	
Iran			Order of Islamic Revolution				
Israel			Israeli Presidential Medal of Honour	2012		See also: Orders, decorations, and medals of Israel	
Italy			Order of Merit of the Italian Republic			See also: Orders, decorations, and medals of Italy Knight Grand Cross with Collar is the highest grade of the order.	
Ivory Coast			National Order of the Ivory Coast			Collar is the highest grade of the order.	
Jamaica			Order of the National Hero	1969	7	See also: Orders, decorations, and medals of Jamaica	
Japan			Order of the Chrysanthemum			See also: Orders, decorations, and medals of Japan Collar is the highest grade of the order.	
Jordan			Order of Al-Hussein bin Ali			See also: Orders, decorations, and medals of Jordan Collar is the highest grade of the order.	
Kazakhstan			Order of the Golden Eagle			See also: Orders, decorations, and medals of Kazakhstan Hero of Kazakhstan is the highest civilian title awarded in Kazakhstan.	
Kenya			Order of the Golden Heart			See also: Orders, decorations, and medals of Kenya Chief is the highest grade of the order.	
Kiribati			Kiribati Grand Order			See also: Orders, decorations, and medals of Kiribati	
Kosovo			Hero of Kosovo Order			See also: Orders, decorations, and medals of Kosovo	
Kuwait			Order of Mubarak the Great			See also: Orders, decorations, and medals of Kuwait Collar is the highest grade of the order.	
Kyrgyzstan			Order of Manas	1997		See also: Orders, decorations, and medals of Kyrgyzstan First Class is the highest grade of the order. Hero of the Kyrgyz Republic is the highest civilian title awarded in Kyrgyzstan.	
Laos			National Gold Medal				
Latvia			Order of the Three Stars		List	See also: Orders, decorations, and medals of Latvia Commander Grand Cross with Chain is the highest grade of the order.	
Lebanon			Order of Merit			See also: Orders, decorations, and medals of Lebanon Extraordinary Class is the highest grade of the order.	
Lesotho			Order of Lesotho			See also: Orders, decorations, and medals of Lesotho Grand Commander is the highest grade of the order.	
Liberia			Humane Order of African Redemption			Grand Commander is the highest grade of the order.	
Liechtenstein			Order of Merit of the Principality of Liechtenstein			See also: Orders, decorations, and medals of Liechtenstein Grand Cross Special Class is the highest grade of the order.	
Lithuania			Order of Vytautas the Great			See also: Orders, decorations, and medals of Lithuania Special Class is the highest grade of the order.	
Luxembourg			Order of the Gold Lion of the House of Nassau			See also: Orders, decorations, and medals of Luxembourg	
Madagascar			National Order of Madagascar			Grand Cordon is the highest grade of the order.	
Malawi			Order of the National Achievement			Most Excellent Grand Commander is the highest grade of the order.	
Malaysia			Order of the Royal Family of Malaysia		13	See also: Orders, decorations, and medals of Malaysia Awarded only to the Malay rulers who have been appointed the Yang di-Pertuan Agong.	
Maldives			Order of Ghazi	1965	7		
Mali			National Order of Mali			Grand Cross is the highest grade of the order.	
Malta			National Order of Merit			See also: Orders, decorations, and medals of Malta Honorary Companion of Honour with Collar is the highest grade of the order.	
Mauritania			National Order of Merit			Grand Cross is the highest grade of the order.	
Mauritius			Order of the Star and Key of the Indian Ocean			Grand Commander is the highest grade of the order.	
Mexico			Order of the Aztec Eagle			See also: Orders, decorations, and medals of Mexico Collar is the highest grade of the order.	
Moldova			Order of the Republic			See also: Orders, decorations, and medals of Moldova	
Monaco			Order of Saint-Charles			See also: Orders, decorations, and medals of Monaco Knight Grand Cross is the highest grade of the order.	
Mongolia			Order of Chinggis Khaan	2005	14	See also: Orders, decorations, and medals of Mongolia Hero of Labour of Mongolia is the highest civilian title awarded in Mongolia.	
Morocco			Order of Muhammad			Special Class is the highest grade of the order.	
Montenegro			Order of the Republic of Montenegro			See also: Orders, decorations, and medals of Montenegro First Class is the highest grade of the order.	
Mozambique			Order of Eduardo Mondlane			See also: Orders, decorations, and medals of Mozambique	
Myanmar			Order of the Union of Burma			See also: Orders, decorations, and medals of Myanmar Grand Commander is the highest grade of the order. Thiri Thudhamma Thingaha is the highest civilian title awarded in Myanmar.	
Namibia			Order of the Welwitschia			See also: Orders, decorations, and medals of Namibia Grand Collar is the highest grade of the order.	
Nauru			Order of Nauru				
Nepal			Nepal Ratna Man Padavi	2010	5	National Hero of Nepal is the highest civilian title awarded in Nepal.	
Netherlands			Order of the Netherlands Lion		List	See also: Orders, decorations, and medals of the Netherlands Knight Grand Cross is the highest grade of the order.	
New Zealand			Order of New Zealand	1987	69	See also: Orders, decorations, and medals of New Zealand	
Nicaragua			Order of Augusto César Sandino			Battle of San Jacinto is the highest grade of the order.	
Niger			National Order of Niger			Grand Cross is the highest grade of the order.	
Nigeria			Order of the Federal Republic			See also: Orders, decorations, and medals of Nigeria Grand Commander is the highest grade of the order.	
Niue			Niue Distinguished Service Cross			See also: Niue National Awards	
North Korea			Order of Kim Il Sung			See also: Orders, decorations, and medals of North Korea Both orders are the joint-highest civilian awards of North Korea. Hero of Labour is the highest civilian title awarded in North Korea.	
North Korea			Order of Kim Jong Il			See also: Orders, decorations, and medals of North Korea Both orders are the joint-highest civilian awards of North Korea. Hero of Labour is the highest civilian title awarded in North Korea.	
North Macedonia			Order of the Republic of North Macedonia			See also: Orders, decorations, and medals of North Macedonia	
Norway			Order of St. Olav			See also: Orders, decorations, and medals of Norway Grand Cross with Collar is the highest grade of the order.	
Oman			Order of Al Said			See also: Orders, decorations, and medals of Oman	
Pakistan			Nishan-e-Pakistan	1959		See also: Orders, decorations, and medals of Pakistan Collar is the highest grade of the order.	
Palestine			Order of the State of Palestine			See also: Orders, decorations, and medals of Palestine Grand Collar is the highest grade of the order.	
Panama			Order of Manuel Amador Guerrero			Collar is the highest grade of the order.	
Papua New Guinea			Order of Logohu			See also: Orders, decorations, and medals of Papua New Guinea Grand Companion is the highest grade of the order.	
Paraguay			National Order of Merit			Grand Cross is the highest grade of the order.	
Peru			Order of the Sun of Peru			Grand Collar is the highest grade of the order.	
Philippines			Quezon Service Cross	1951	7	See also: Orders, decorations, and medals of the Philippines National Hero of the Philippines is the highest civilian title awarded in the Philippines.	
Poland			Order of the White Eagle	1921	355	See also: Orders, decorations, and medals of Poland	
Portugal			Military Order of the Tower and Sword			See also: Orders, decorations, and medals of Portugal Grand Collar is the highest grade of the order.	
Qatar			Order of Independence			Collar is the highest grade of the order. Sword of the Founder Sheikh Jassim bin Mohammed bin Thani is the highest state decoration.	
Romania			Order of the Star of Romania			See also: Orders, decorations, and medals of Romania Collar is the highest grade of the order.	
Russia			Order of St. Andrew			See also: Orders, decorations, and medals of Russia Hero of the Russian Federation is the highest civilian title awarded in Russia.	
Rwanda			National Liberation Medal			See also: Orders, decorations, and medals of Rwanda National Hero of Rwanda is the highest civilian title awarded in Rwanda.	
Sahrawi Arab Democratic Republic			Medal of Honour of International Solidarity				
Saint Kitts and Nevis			Order of the National Hero	1998	5		
Saint Lucia			Order of Saint Lucia			Grand Cross is the highest grade of the order.	
Samoa			Grand Order of Samoa			See also: Orders, decorations, and medals of Samoa	
San Marino			Order of San Marino			Knight Grand Cross is the highest grade of the order.	
Saudi Arabia			Great Chain of Badr			See also: Orders, decorations, and medals of Saudi Arabia	
Senegal			National Order of the Lion			See also: Orders, decorations, and medals of Senegal Grand Cross is the highest grade of the order.	
Serbia			Order of the Republic of Serbia	2009		See also: Orders, decorations, and medals of Serbia First Class is the highest grade of the order.	
Seychelles			Medal of the Republic				
Sierra Leone			Order of the Republic			See also: Orders, decorations, and medals of Sierra Leone Grand Commander is the highest grade of the order.	
Singapore			Darjah Utama Temasek			See also: Orders, decorations, and medals of Singapore With High Distinction is the highest grade of the order.	
Slovakia			Order of the White Double Cross	94	186	See also: Orders, decorations, and medals of Slovakia First Class is the highest grade of the order.	
Slovenia			Order of Freedom of the Republic of Slovenia			See also: Orders, decorations, and medals of Slovenia Gold Medal is the highest grade of the order.	
Solomon Islands			Star of the Solomon Islands	1982			
Somalia			Order of the Somali Star	1965		See also: Orders, decorations, and medals of Somalia Order of the Leopard is the highest grade of the order.	
South Africa			Order of Mapungubwe			See also: Orders, decorations, and medals of South Africa Platinum is the highest grade of the order.	
South Korea			Grand Order of Mugunghwa			See also: Orders, decorations, and medals of South Korea	
South Ossetia			Order of Uatsamonga			See also: Orders, decorations, and medals of South Ossetia	
Spain			Order of the Golden Fleece	1430	List	See also: Orders, decorations, and medals of Spain	
Sri Lanka			Sri Lankabhimanya	1986	9	See also: Orders, decorations, and medals of Sri Lanka National Hero of Sri Lanka is the highest civilian title awarded in Sri Lanka.	
Sudan			Collar of Honour			See also: Orders, decorations, and medals of Sudan	
Suriname			Honorary Order of the Yellow Star			Grand Cordon is the highest grade of the order.	
Sweden			Order of the Seraphim	1748	List	See also: Orders, decorations, and medals of Sweden Collar is the highest grade of the order.	
Syria			Order of the Unity of the Nation			First Class is the highest grade of the order.	
Taiwan			Order of Brilliant Jade		22	See also: Orders, decorations, and medals of the Republic of China	
Tajikistan			Order of the Star of the President of Tajikistan			See also: Orders, decorations, and medals of Tajikistan First Class is the highest grade of the order. Hero of Tajikistan is the highest civilian title awarded in Tajikistan.	
Tanzania			Order of Mwalimu Julius Kambarage Nyerere	2011	3	See also: Orders, decorations, and medals of Tanzania Awarded only to the former President of Tanzania.	
Thailand			Order of the Rajamitrabhorn	1962	33	See also: Orders, decorations, and medals of Thailand	
Timor-Leste			Order of Timor-Leste			See also: Orders, decorations, and medals of Timor-Leste	
Togo			Order of Mono			Knight Grand Cross is the highest grade of the order.	
Tonga			Order of the Crown of Tonga			See also: Orders, decorations, and medals of Tonga Knight Grand Cross is the highest grade of the order.	
Transnistria			Order of the Republic			See also: Orders, decorations, and medals of Transnistria	
Trinidad and Tobago			Order of the Republic of Trinidad and Tobago			See also: Orders, decorations, and medals of Trinidad and Tobago	
Tunisia			Order of Independence				
Turkey			Order of the State of the Republic of Turkey	1994	30	See also: Orders, decorations, and medals of Turkey Order of the State is the highest grade of the order.	
Turkmenistan			Watan Order	2007	1	See also: Orders, decorations, and medals of Turkmenistan Awarded only to the incumbent President of Turkmenistan. Hero of Turkmenistan is the highest civilian title awarded in Turkmenistan.	
Tuvalu			Tuvalu Order of Merit	2017	3		
Uganda			Most Excellent Order of the Pearl of Africa	2007	8	See also: Orders, decorations, and medals of Uganda	
Ukraine			Order of Liberty		75	See also: Orders, decorations, and medals of Ukraine Hero of Ukraine is the highest civilian title awarded in Ukraine.	
United Arab Emirates			Order of Zayed				
United Kingdom			Order of the Garter	1348	List	See also: Orders, decorations, and medals of the United Kingdom Knight Companion is the highest grade of the order.	
United States			Congressional Gold Medal	1776	List	See also: Orders, decorations, and medals of the United States Both medals are the joint-highest civilian awards of the United States. With Distinction is the highest grade of the Presidential Medal of Freedom.	
United States			Presidential Medal of Freedom	1963	List	See also: Orders, decorations, and medals of the United States Both medals are the joint-highest civilian awards of the United States. With Distinction is the highest grade of the Presidential Medal of Freedom.	
Uruguay			Medal of the Oriental Republic of Uruguay			See also: Orders, decorations, and medals of Uruguay	
Uzbekistan			Order of Highest Friendship	2020	8	See also: Orders, decorations, and medals of Uzbekistan Hero of Uzbekistan is the highest civilian title awarded in Uzbekistan.	
Vanuatu			Order of Vanuatu			Badge of Honour is the highest grade of the order.	
Vatican City			Order of Pope Pius IX			See also: Orders, decorations, and medals of the Holy See Knight with the Collar is the highest grade of the order.	
Venezuela			Order of the Liberators of Venezuela				
Vietnam			Gold Star Order	1958	List	See also: Orders, decorations, and medals of Vietnam Hero of Labour is the highest civilian title awarded in Vietnam.	
Yemen			Order of the Republic			Grand Cordon is the highest grade of the order.	
Zambia			Order of the Eagle of Zambia			Grand Commander is the highest grade of the order.	
Zimbabwe			Zimbabwe Order of Merit			See also: Orders, decorations, and medals of Zimbabwe	

== See also ==
- State order
- State decoration
- Civil awards and decorations
- List of civil awards and decorations
- List of highest military decorations by country
