= Lists of military decorations =

This list of military decorations is an index to articles about notable military decorations. It is organized by country in alphabetical order and in order of precedence. Note that there are many pages which overlap the domain of this page, including military awards and decorations and campaign medal, and pages mentioned within category:Military awards and decorations, category:Battle honours, category:Orders, decorations, and medals and other categories.

== By country ==
=== Afghanistan ===
Orders, decorations, and medals of Afghanistan

=== Albania ===
Orders, decorations, and medals of Albania

=== Algeria ===
- Orders, decorations, and medals of Algeria

=== Ancient Rome ===
Military awards and decorations of ancient Rome

=== Andorra ===
Orders, decorations, and medals of Andorra

=== Antigua and Barbuda ===
Orders, decorations, and medals of Antigua and Barbuda

=== Argentina ===
Orders, decorations, and medals of Argentina

=== Armenia ===
Orders, decorations, and medals of Armenia

=== Australia ===
Australian honours system

=== Austria ===
==== Austria (Republic) ====
Orders, decorations, and medals of Austria

==== Austria-Hungary (Monarchy) ====
Military awards and decorations of Austria-Hungary

=== Azerbaijan ===
Orders, decorations, and medals of Azerbaijan

=== Bahamas ===
Orders, decorations, and medals of the Bahamas

=== Bahrain ===
Orders, decorations, and medals of Bahrain

=== Bangladesh ===
- Orders, decorations, and medals of Bangladesh
  - Medals of the Bangladesh Armed Forces

=== Barbados ===
Orders, decorations, and medals of Barbados

=== Belarus ===
Orders, decorations, and medals of Belarus

=== Belgium ===
- Orders, decorations, and medals of Belgium
- Belgian order of precedence (decorations and medals)

=== Belize ===
Orders, decorations, and medals of Belize

=== Benin ===
Orders, decorations, and medals of Benin

=== Bhutan ===
Category:Orders, decorations, and medals of Bhutan

=== Bolivia ===
Orders, decorations, and medals of Bolivia

=== Bosnia and Herzegovina ===
Orders, decorations, and medals of Bosnia and Herzegovina

=== Botswana ===
Orders, decorations and medals of Botswana

=== Brazil ===
Orders, decorations, and medals of Brazil

=== British Empire ===
Orders, decorations, and medals of the British Empire

=== Brunei ===
Orders, decorations, and medals of Brunei

=== Bulgaria ===
Orders, decorations, and medals of Bulgaria

=== Burma ===
Orders, decorations, and medals of Burma

=== Cambodia ===
- Orders, decorations, and medals of Cambodia

=== Cameroon ===
Orders, decorations, and medals of Cameroon

=== Canada ===
- Orders, decorations, and medals of Canada
- Orders, decorations, and medals of the Canadian provinces

=== Chile ===
- Orders, decorations, and medals of Chile

=== China ===
- Orders, decorations, and medals of China

=== Colombia ===
- Category:Orders, decorations, and medals of Colombia

=== Comoros ===
- Category:Orders, decorations, and medals of the Comoros

=== Confederate States ===
- Davis Guards Medal

=== (Democratic Republic of the) Congo ===
- Category:Orders, decorations, and medals of the Democratic Republic of the Congo

=== Croatia ===
- Orders, decorations, and medals of Croatia
- Orders, decorations, and medals of the Independent State of Croatia

=== Cuba ===
- Category:Orders, decorations, and medals of Cuba

=== Cyprus ===
- Order of Makarios III

=== Czech Republic ===
- State decorations of the Czech Republic

=== Czechoslovakia ===
- Category:Orders, decorations, and medals of Czechoslovakia
  - Category:Military awards and decorations of Czechoslovakia
- Order of the Falcon (Czechoslovakia)
- Order of the White Lion
- Military Cross (Czechoslovakia)
- Legion of Merit (Czechoslovakia)
- Czechoslovak War Cross

- Czechoslovak War Cross 1918
- Czechoslovak War Cross 1939–1945

- Medal of Merit (Czechoslovakia)

=== Denmark ===
- Orders, decorations, and medals of Denmark

=== Dominica ===
- Category:Orders, decorations, and medals of Dominica

=== Dominican Republic ===
- Orders, decorations, and medals of the Dominican Republic

=== Ecuador ===
- Category:Orders, decorations, and medals of Ecuador

=== Egypt ===
- Category:Orders, decorations, and medals of Egypt
- Order of the Nile
- Order of Ismail
- Order of Ramesseses The Great
- Order of Nasser
- Medal of Narmer
- Medal of The Golden Eagle
- Order of the Bronze Eagle

=== El Salvador ===
- Category:Orders, decorations, and medals of El Salvador

=== Estonia ===
- Orders, decorations, and medals of Estonia

=== Ethiopia ===
- Category:Orders, decorations, and medals of Ethiopia
- Order of Menelik II

=== Fiji ===
- Fijian honours system

=== Finland ===
- Orders, decorations, and medals of Finland

=== France ===
- Orders, decorations, and medals of France
- Historical orders, decorations, and medals of France
- French overseas orders

=== Gabon ===
- National Order of Merit
- Order of the Equatorial Star

=== Georgia (country) ===
- Orders, decorations, and medals of Georgia

=== Germany ===
- Orders, decorations, and medals of Germany

=== Ghana ===
- Orders, decorations, and medals of Ghana

=== Greece ===
- Orders, decorations, and medals of Greece

=== Greenland ===
- Category:Orders, decorations, and medals of Greenland

=== Guatemala ===
- Category:Orders, decorations, and medals of Guatemala

=== Guinea ===
- National Order of Merit

=== Equatorial Guinea ===
- Category:Orders, decorations, and medals of Equatorial Guinea

=== Guyana ===
- Orders, decorations, and medals of Guyana

=== Haiti ===
- Category:Orders, decorations, and medals of Haiti

=== Holy See ===
Orders, decorations, and medals of the Holy See

=== Hong Kong ===
- Orders, decorations, and medals of Hong Kong

=== Hungary ===
- Orders, decorations, and medals of Hungary

=== Iceland ===
- Category:Orders, decorations, and medals of Iceland

=== India ===
- Awards and decorations of the Indian Armed Forces

=== Indonesia ===
- Orders, decorations, and medals of Indonesia

=== Iran ===
- Category:Orders, decorations, and medals of Iran
- Awards and decorations of the Islamic Republic of Iran Armed Forces

=== Iraq ===
- Category:Orders, decorations, and medals of Iraq
- Order of the Date Palm
- Order of the Two Rivers

=== Ireland ===
Military awards and decorations of Ireland

=== Israel ===
- Category:Orders, decorations, and medals of Israel
  - Category:Military awards and decorations of Israel

=== Italy ===
- Orders, decorations, and medals of Italy

=== Ivory Coast ===
- Category:Orders, decorations, and medals of Ivory Coast

=== Jamaica ===
- Orders, decorations, and medals of Jamaica

=== Japan ===
- Orders, decorations, and medals of Japan

=== Jordan ===
- Orders, decorations, and medals of Jordan

=== Kazakhstan ===
- Orders, decorations, and medals of Kazakhstan

=== Kenya ===
- Orders, decorations, and medals of Kenya

=== Kiribati ===
- Orders, decorations, and medals of Kiribati

=== Korea ===
==== North Korea ====
- Orders and medals of North Korea

==== South Korea ====
- Orders, decorations, and medals of South Korea

=== Kosovo ===
- Orders, decorations, and medals of Kosovo

=== Kuwait ===
- Category:Orders, decorations, and medals of Kuwait
- Wisam al-Tahrir (or Kuwait Liberation Medal)

=== Kyrgyzstan ===
- Orders, decorations, and medals of Kyrgyzstan

=== Latvia ===
- Orders, decorations, and medals of Latvia

=== Lebanon ===
- Orders, decorations, and medals of Lebanon

=== Liberia ===
- Category:Orders, decorations, and medals of Liberia

=== Libya ===
- Category:Orders, decorations, and medals of Libya

=== Liechtenstein ===
- Orders, decorations, and medals of Liechtenstein

=== Lithuania ===
- Orders, decorations, and medals of Lithuania

=== Luxembourg (Monarchy) ===
Orders, decorations, and medals of Luxembourg

=== Macau ===
- Orders, decorations, and medals of Macau

=== Madagascar ===
- Category:Orders, decorations, and medals of Madagascar

=== Malawi ===
- Category:Orders, decorations, and medals of Malawi

=== (Federation of) Malaya ===
- Johan Mangku Negara
- Panglima Mangku Negara

=== Malaysia ===
Orders, decorations, and medals of Malaysia

=== Mali ===
- Category:Orders, decorations, and medals of Mali

=== Malta ===
- Orders, decorations, and medals of Malta
- Sovereign Military Order of Malta
- Order pro merito Melitensi

=== Mauritius ===
- Category:Orders, decorations, and medals of Mauritius

=== Mexico ===
- Orders, decorations, and medals of Mexico
  - Mexican Imperial Orders
- Military decorations of Mexico

=== Moldova ===
- Orders, decorations, and medals of Moldova

=== Monaco ===
- Orders, decorations, and medals of Monaco

=== Mongolia ===
- Category:Orders, decorations, and medals of Mongolia

=== Montenegro ===
- Orders, decorations, and medals of Montenegro

=== Morocco ===
- Category:Orders, decorations, and medals of Morocco
- Order of Ouissam Alaouite
- Order of the Military (Morocco)
- Sharifian Order of Military Merit
- Order of Military Merit (Morocco)

=== Mozambique ===
- Orders, decorations, and medals of Mozambique

=== Myanmar ===
- Orders, decorations, and medals of Myanmar

=== Namibia ===
- Orders, decorations, and medals of Namibia

Decorations

- Namibian Cross for Bravery in Gold
- Order of Mukorob
- Namibian Cross for Bravery in Silver
- Namibian Cross for Bravery in Bronze

Campaign Medal(s)

- Campaign Medal

Long Service Medals

- Service Medal: 30 Years
- Service Medal: 20 Years
- Service Medal: 10 Years

Shooting Medal(s)

- Namibian Champion Shot Medal

=== Nepal ===
- Category:Orders, decorations, and medals of Nepal

=== Netherlands ===
- Category:Orders, decorations, and medals of the Netherlands
  - Category:Military awards and decorations of the Netherlands

Knightly military Orders

- Military Order of William
- Order of Orange-Nassau (Military division)

Decorations

- Cross for Courage and Fidelity (Not awarded anymore)
- Honorary Sabre (Not currently awarded)
- Honorable Mention (Obsolete)
- Bronze Lion
- Bronze Cross
- Cross of Merit
- Airman's Cross
- Decoration of Merit
- Decoration for Important Military Acts (Not currently awarded)
- Lombok Cross (Not awarded anymore)
- War Remembrance Cross (Not awarded anymore)
- Decoration for Order and Peace (Not awarded anymore)
- New Guinea Remembrance Cross (Not awarded anymore)
- Mobilisation War Cross (Not awarded anymore)
- Cross for Justice and Freedom
- Remembrance Medal UN Peace Operations (Not awarded anymore)
- Remembrance Medal Multinational Operations (Not awarded anymore)
- Remembrance Medal Peace Operations
- Kosovo Medal
- Decoration for Long-term Service as an Officer
- Decoration for Long-term and Loyal Service at the Military Coastguard
- Decoration Master-Marksman
- Skills Medal KNIL (of the Royal Dutch East Indies Army – Not awarded anymore)
- Shooting Price Star (of the Royal Dutch East Indies Army – Not awarded anymore)
- Army Medal
- Cross for the Four Day Marches

=== New Zealand ===
- New Zealand royal honours system

=== Nigeria ===
- Orders, decorations, and medals of Nigeria

=== North Macedonia ===
- Orders, decorations, and medals of North Macedonia

=== Norway ===
- Orders, decorations, and medals of Norway

=== Oman ===
- Orders, decorations, and medals of Oman

=== Ottoman Empire ===
- Category:Orders, decorations, and medals of the Ottoman Empire

=== Palestine ===
- Decorations, medals and badges of Palestine
- Orders, decorations, and medals of the State of Palestine

=== Pakistan ===
- Awards and decorations of the Pakistan Armed Forces
- Civil decorations of Pakistan

=== Panama ===
- Category:Orders, decorations, and medals of Panama

=== Papua New Guinea ===
- Papua New Guinea honours system

=== Peru ===
- Category:Orders, decorations, and medals of Peru

=== Philippines ===
Awards and decorations of the Armed Forces of the Philippines

=== Poland ===
- Orders, decorations, and medals of Poland

=== Portugal ===
- Orders, decorations, and medals of Portugal

=== Qatar ===
- Category:Orders, decorations and medals of Qatar

=== Rhodesia ===
- Orders, decorations, and medals of Rhodesia

Military decorations and medals awarded during the UDI (Unilateral Declaration of Independence) period from 1965 to 1979. See also Zimbabwe.

Decorations

- Grand Cross of Valour (GCV) (1970–1981)
- Order of the Legion of Merit: Military Division (1970–1981)
- Silver Cross of Rhodesia (SCR) (1970–1981)
- Bronze Cross of Rhodesia (BCR) (1970–1981)
- Defence Cross for Distinguished Service (DCD) (1976–1981)
- Meritorious Conduct Medal (MCM) (1970–1981)
- Medal for Meritorious Service (MSM) (1973–1981)
- Defence Forces' Medal for Meritorious Service (DMM) (1971–1981)

Campaign Medals

- Rhodesia General Service Medal (1969)

Long Service Medals

- Exemplary Service Medal (1970–1981)
- Medal for Territorial and Reserve Service (1970–1981)

Shooting Medals

- President's Medal for Shooting (1970–1981)

Other Awards

- Military Forces Commendation (emblem) (1970–1981)

=== Romania ===
- Orders, decorations, and medals of Romania

=== Russian Federation ===
- Orders, decorations, and medals of Russia

Honorary titles

- Hero of the Russian Federation

Orders

- Order of St. Andrew (highest civil and military award)
- Order of Saint George (highest military award)
- Order of Merit for the Motherland
- Order of Courage
- Order of Zhukov
- Order of Suvorov
- Order of Ushakov
- Order of Kutuzov
- Order of Alexander Nevsky
- Order of Nakhimov
- Order of Naval Merit
- Order of Military Merit

Medals

- Medal of the Gold Star (for the title "Hero of the Russian Federation")
- Medal of the Order of Merit for the Motherland
- Medal "For Courage"
- Medal of Suvorov
- Medal of Nesterov
- Medal of Ushakov
- Medal of Zhukov
- Medal "For Distinction in the Protection of the State Borders"
- Medal "For Distinction in the Protection of Public Order"

=== Rwanda ===
- Orders, decorations, and medals of Rwanda

=== Saint Lucia ===
- Category:Orders, decorations, and medals of Saint Lucia

=== Samoa ===
- Orders, decorations, and medals of Samoa

=== San Marino ===
- Category:Orders, decorations, and medals of San Marino

=== Saudi Arabia ===
- Category:Orders, decorations, and medals of Saudi Arabia
- Nuth al-Tahrir al-Kuwait (or Medal for the Liberation of Kuwait)

=== Senegal ===
- Orders, decorations, and medals of Senegal

=== Serbia ===
- Orders, decorations, and medals of Serbia

=== Sierra Leone ===
- Category:Orders, decorations, and medals of Sierra Leone

=== Singapore ===
- Category:Orders, decorations, and medals of Singapore
  - Category:Military awards and decorations of Singapore

=== Slovakia ===
- Orders, decorations, and medals of Slovakia

=== Slovenia ===
- Orders, decorations, and medals of Slovenia

=== Solomon Islands ===
- Category:Orders, decorations, and medals of the Solomon Islands

=== Somalia ===
- Military awards and decorations of Somalia

=== South Africa ===
- Orders, decorations, and medals of South Africa
- South African military decorations order of wearing
- South African military decorations

=== Soviet Union ===
- Orders, decorations, and medals of the Soviet Union

=== Spain ===
- Orders, decorations, and medals of Spain

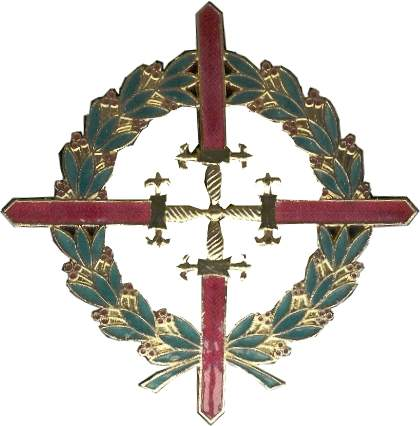
Cruz laureada de San Fernando

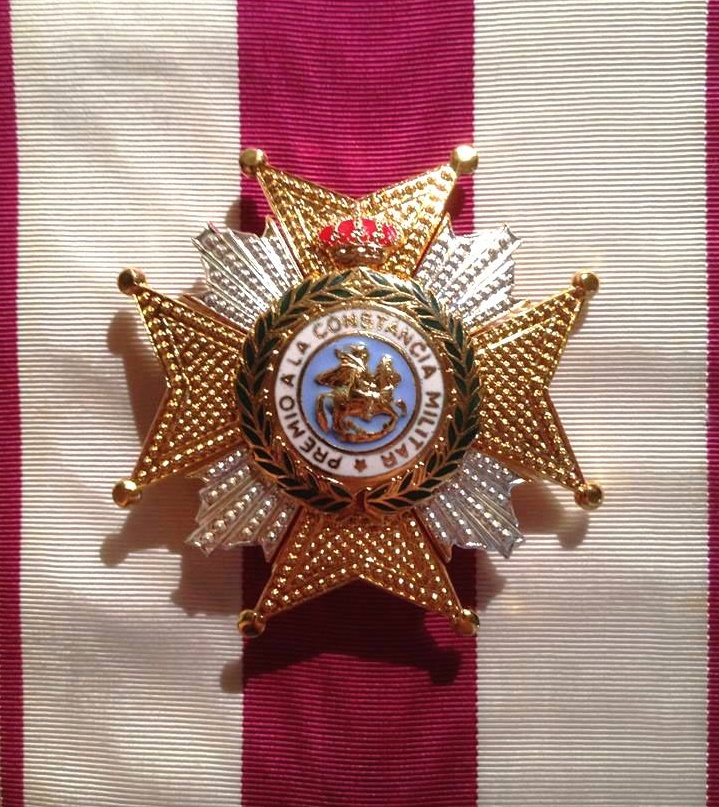
Royal and Military Order of Saint Hermenegild

==== Kingdom of Spain ====
- Laureate Cross of Saint Ferdinand
- Medalla Militar (Military Medal)
- Cruz de Guerra (War Cross)
- Medalla del Ejército (Army Medal)
- Medalla Naval (Navy Medal)
- Medalla Aérea (Air Force Medal)
- Orden del Mérito Militar (Order of Military Merit)
- Orden del Mérito Naval (Order of Naval Merit)
- Orden del Mérito Policial (Order of Policial Merit)
- Orden del Mérito Aeronáutico (Order of Air Force Merit)
- Real y Militar Orden de San Hermenegildo (Royal & Military Order of Saint Hermenegildo)
- Cruz a la Constancia en el Servicio (Long Military Service Cross)
- Medalla de Campaña (Campaign Medal)

==== Second Spanish Republic ====
- Laureate Plate of Madrid
- Madrid Distinction
- Order of the Spanish Republic
- Medal of the International Brigades
- Medalla al Valor (Medal of Valor)
- Medalla de la Libertad (Medal of Freedom)
- Medalla de Sufrimientos por la Patria (Medal of the Suffering for the Fatherland)
- Medalla de la Segunda Guerra de la Independencia (Medal of the Second War of Independence)

Reference: Segunda República (1931–1939)

=== Sri Lanka ===
- Orders, decorations, and medals of Sri Lanka
- Military awards and decorations of Sri Lanka

=== Suriname ===
- Category:Orders, decorations, and medals of Suriname

=== Swaziland ===
Decorations

- Umbutfo Swaziland Defence Force Medal for Distinguished Service (1980–present)
- Umbutfo Swaziland Defence Force Medal for Meritorious Service (1980–present)

Long Service Medals

- Umbutfo Swaziland Defence Force Long Service Medal (1980–present)

=== Sweden ===
- Orders, decorations, and medals of Sweden

=== Syria ===
- Category:Orders, decorations, and medals of Syria

=== Taiwan (Republic of China) ===
- Orders, decorations, and medals of the Republic of China

=== Tanzania ===
- Orders, decorations, and medals of Tanzania

=== Thailand ===
- Orders, decorations, and medals of Thailand

=== Timor-Leste ===
- Orders, decorations, and medals of Timor-Leste

=== Togo ===
- Category:Orders, decorations, and medals of Togo

=== Tonga ===
- Orders, decorations, and medals of Tonga

=== Tunisia ===
- Category:Orders, decorations, and medals of Tunisia

=== Turkey ===
- Orders, decorations, and medals of Turkey

=== Turkmenistan ===
- Orders, decorations, and medals of Turkmenistan

=== Tuscany ===
- Category:Orders, decorations, and medals of Tuscany

=== Two Sicilies ===
- Category:Orders, decorations, and medals of the Kingdom of the Two Sicilies

=== Uganda ===
- Orders, decorations, and medals of Uganda

=== Ukraine ===
- Orders, decorations, and medals of Ukraine

=== United Arab Emirates ===
- Category:Orders, decorations, and medals of the United Arab Emirates

=== United Kingdom ===
- Orders, decorations, and medals of the United Kingdom
- Military awards and decorations of the United Kingdom

=== United States ===
- Awards and decorations of the United States military
- Awards and decorations of the United States government

=== Uruguay ===
- Orders, decorations, and medals of Uruguay

=== Vanuatu ===
- Category:Orders, decorations, and medals of Vanuatu

=== Venezuela ===
- Category:Orders, decorations, and medals of Venezuela

=== Vietnam ===
- Vietnam awards and decorations

==== South Vietnam (former) ====
- Orders, decorations, and medals of South Vietnam

=== Zambia ===
- Category:Orders, decorations, and medals of Zambia

=== Zanzibar ===
- Category:Orders, decorations, and medals of the Sultanate of Zanzibar

=== Zimbabwe ===
- Orders, decorations, and medals of Zimbabwe

== See also ==
- Lists of awards
- List of highest military decorations by country
- List of wound decorations by country
- List of military awards and decorations of World War II
- Awards and decorations of the Vietnam War
- Awards and decorations of the Bangladesh Liberation War
- List of military awards and decorations of the Gulf War
- List of military awards and decorations of the international military intervention against the Islamic State
- List of international military decorations
  - United Nations Medal
