= List of highest military decorations by country =

This list of highest military decorations is an index to articles that describe the highest military decoration awarded by each country in the world.

Note that some countries do not have separate civilian and military awards systems, and as such some countries' highest military awards may also be civilian awards.

Country	Image	Name	Date first awarded	Number awarded	Notes
Argentina		Cross to the Heroic Valour in Combat		18	Last awarded in 1982
Armenia	Fatherland Armenia	National Hero of Armenia	28 July 1994	27	The highest title in Armenia is National Hero of Armenia, which is awarded alongside an Order of Fatherland and may also be conferred on members of the military.
Armenia	1st degree combat cross Arm.	Order of the Combat Cross	Established 22 April 1994		Awarded for absolute courage, selflessness and skill in defending the Fatherland. It is divided into First and Second degrees.
Australia		The Victoria Cross for Australia	16 January 2009	5	Replaced The Victoria Cross
Austria		The Military Merit Decoration			
Azerbaijan	Gold Star medal of Azerbaijan	National Hero of Azerbaijan	7 June 1992		Highest national title of Azerbaijan, conferred alongside the Qizil Ulduz ("Gold Star") Medal. Awarded for outstanding services of national importance to Azerbaijan in defence and strengthening of the state system and creation of important national values.
Azerbaijan	Şah İsmayıl ordeni	Shah Ismail Order	Established 6 December 1993		Highest military award of Azerbaijan
Bangladesh		Bir Sreshtho	15 December 1973	7	
Belarus	Medal Hero of Belarus	Hero of Belarus	21 November 1996	13	Highest title that can be awarded to a citizen of Belarus. Can be conferred for military or civilian service.
Belarus	Orden Voinskoy Slavy	Order of Military Glory	Established 13 April 1995		The highest order of Belarus is the Order of the Fatherland which may also be awarded for military service. There is also a separate Medal for Bravery.
Belgium		Military Decoration for gallantry or exceptional devotion	22 December 1873		
Botswana		Conduct Valour Cross (CVC)	Established 1979		
Brazil		Order of Military Merit	1934	820	
Bulgaria		Order of Bravery	Established 1 January 1880		
Canada		The Victoria Cross of Canada	Established 2 February 1993	0	Replaced the Victoria Cross
China		Order of August First	12 June 2017	10	
Colombia		Order of San Mateo			
Croatia	Order of Duke Domagoj	Order of Duke Domagoj	1995	566 (Note: Total medals awarded.); 551 (Note: Total recipients of the medal.)	Established in 1995, this is Croatia's highest award for bravery and the 8th highest national medal.
Cuba	Hero of the Republic of Cuba	Hero of the Republic of Cuba	1980		This honorary title is the highest decoration awarded by the Republic of Cuba, conferred for civilian and military merit in productive labour, defence of the interests of the working class, and contributions to proletarian internationalism.
Cuba	Orden cubana de Cienfuegos (cropped)	Order Camilo Cienfuegos	Established 1979		Awarded to members of the Revolutionary Armed Forces of Cuba, and to the military of "friendly countries".
Czech Republic	CzechMedalOfHonor	Medal of Heroism	Established 1990		Created by the Parliament of the Czechoslovak Federative Republic in 1990, and awarded once before its re-authorization by the Czech Republic in 1992. May also be awarded to civilians.
Denmark		The Valour Cross	18 November 2011	1	
Egypt	Order of the Sinai Star medal	Order of the Sinai Star	Established 1972	200	
Estonia		The Cross of Liberty	24 February 1919	3,156	None has been awarded since 1925
Finland	Mannerheim Cross, first and second classes	Mannerheim Cross	22 July 1941	197; 191	Highest gallantry award of Finland and the most distinguished military award, however next in official precedence to the Grand Cross of the Order of the Cross of Liberty. Awarded in two classes. Still active de jure, although none have been awarded since 1945. Last living recipient died in November 2020.
Finland	Grand Cross of the Order of the Cross of Liberty with Swords for wartime merits	Order of the Cross of Liberty	Established 4 March 1918		Highest military order of Finland, with its Grand Cross as its highest decoration; Mannerheim Cross is also awarded by the Order of the Cross of Liberty.
France		The Legion of Honour	15 July 1804		Conferred in five classes for military or civilian merit.
Germany		The Cross of Honour for Valour	6 July 2009	28	
Georgia	National Hero of Georgia PS work 1	Order of National Hero	Established 24 June 2004		Highest national order of Georgia, awarded alongside the title of National Hero. It is conferred on both civilians and military personnel. The St. George's Victory Order was established in the same year and is awarded for contributions to victorious battles and general significant victories for Georgia. Before 2004 the Order of David IV the Builder was the highest military and civilian order.
Georgia	GEO Vakhtang Gorgasal Order 1rank BAR	Vakhtang Gorgasali Order (1st Class)	Established 1992		The highest purely military decoration of Georgia. It is divided into three degrees. The Military Courage Medal is awarded for heroic and daring actions while carrying out military duties.
Greece		Medal for Gallantry			The Medal for Gallantry formally replaced the Cross of Valour as the top military award in 1974, but it has never been conferred.
Greece		Cross of Valour	1913		The Medal for Gallantry formally replaced the Cross of Valour as the top military award in 1974, but it has never been conferred.
Hungary		Order of Saint Stephen of Hungary	1764-1918, 1938–1946, 2011-		
India		Param Vir Chakra	3 November 1947	21	Highest wartime military decoration.
India		Ashoka Chakra	1952	86	Highest peacetime military decoration.
Iran	Zulfaqar Medal	Zolfaghar	Established 1856, renamed 1925		Revived in 2019 when Major General Qasem Soleimani received the decoration, the first time it had been awarded since 1979.
Ireland	IRE Military Medal for Gallantry with Honour ribbon bar	Military Medal for Gallantry	Established 1944		
Israel		Medal of Valor	19 January 1948	40	Replacement for the Hero of Israel. None has been awarded since 1975.
Italy		Grand Cross of the Military Order of Italy	14 August 1815		The highest italian military order. Initially intended as an award for distinguished command actions in wartime, it was soon extended to reward also non-wartime, non-combat related merits of high-ranking officers.
Italy		Gold Medal of Military Valour	21 May 1793	2606	The highest italian military medal awarded for battlefield acts of valour. It can be awarded individually or as a collective award "to the flag" of a deserving military unit.
Latvia	Viestura ordenis	Order of Viesturs	Established 11 August 1938, discontinued 1940, re-established 2004		Established in 1938 but discontinued after the Soviet occupation of Latvia in 1940. It was re-established in 2004. It is also awarded to civilians, in which case the ribbon is without swords.
Lithuania	Cross of Vytis	Order of the Cross of Vytis	Established 30 July 1919, discontinued 1940, re-established 15 January 1991		Presidential award conferred for heroic defence of Lithuania's freedom and independence. It was established in 1919 but discontinued after the Soviet occupation of Lithuania in 1940, until it was re-established upon independence in 1991. It is also awarded to civilians.
Luxembourg		Military Medal	3 August 1945		
Malaysia		Grand Knight of Valour	Established 29 July 1960	30	The Grand Knight of Valour (Malay: Darjah Kebesaran Seri Pahlawan Gagah Perkasa) is the highest federal award which can be presented in Malaysia. It was created on 29 July 1960 and was gazetted on 11 August 1960. The award is the highest ranking in the list of the Malaysian Federal Ranking of Awards, and is ranked higher than the Order of the Royal Family of Malaysia (D.K.M.) awarded to Malaysian Royalty.|
Mexico		Decoration for Heroic Valor			
Mongolia	MN Order Sukhe Bator	Order of Sukhbaatar	Established 16 May 1941		
Morocco	Ouissam Alaouite Grand Cordon Extraordinary grade AEA Collections	Order of Ouissam Alaouite	Established 11 January 1913		
Myanmar		Aung San Thiriya, 1st Class	1948	6	
Namibia		Namibian Cross for Bravery: Gold			The Order of the Mukorob is also presented by the President of Namibia for meritorious military service.
Netherlands		Military William Order	30 April 1815	5,875	
New Zealand		The Victoria Cross for New Zealand	26 July 2007	1	Replaced The Victoria Cross.
North Korea	Hero of the Democratic People's Republic of Korea	Hero of the Republic	Established 30 June 1950	6116	Honorific title, originally created as Hero of the Korean People's Republic. Awarded for extreme heroic exploits during war. The recipient is also awarded with the Order of the National Flag 1st Class, which was the highest order until the Order of Kim Il-sung was created in 1972.
North Korea		Soldier's Medal of Honour (first class)	Established 1 July 1950		Awarded for acts of individual gallantry in combat.
Norway		The War Cross with Sword	28 November 1941	285	A new sword is awarded each time a person, who already has the War Cross, distinguishes him- or herself in battle.
Oman		Military Order of Oman	1970		
Pakistan		Nishan-e-Haider (Left) Hilal-e-Kashmir (Right)	16 March 1957	11	On 30 November 1995, the Government of Pakistan initiated the gazette notification to declare its Hilal-e-Kashmir equivalent to Nishan-e-Haider. All awards have been made posthumously.
Peru	Order of the Sun Ribbon	Order of the Sun of Peru	Established 8 October 1821, discontinued 1825, re-established 1921		Also the highest civilian award of Peru.
Philippines	Philippine Medal of Valor ribbon	Medal of Valor	15 November 1935	41	
Poland		Order of Virtuti Militari	22 June 1792		Conferred in five classes. A wartime-only award.
Portugal		Order of the Tower and Sword	1459		The Order of the Tower and Sword, as awarded by the Portuguese government today, comes in six classes
Romania		Order of Michael the Brave	Instated 26 September 1916; Disbanded 1948; Reinstated 23 July 2000	2,184	None has been awarded since 1944.
Russia		Hero of the Russian Federation			Honorific title for service to the Russian state and nation, usually connected with a heroic feat of valor; precedes all other Russian military and civil orders and medals.
Russia		Order of St. George	26 November 1769 (O. S.), revived on 20 March 1992		Highest military decoration of the Russian Federation.
Senegal	Cross of Military Valor (Senegal) - ribbon bar	Cross of Military Valor	Established 1 February 1968		
Serbia	Orden Karađorđeve zvezde prvog stepena	Order of Karađorđe's Star	Established 1 January 1904		Originated in the Kingdom of Serbia and later awarded by the Kingdom of Yugoslavia. It continued to be awarded by the Yugoslav government-in-exile but was suppressed by the communist government of Yugoslavia, during which time the Order of Freedom was the highest military decoration. It was reinstated by the Republic of Serbia in 2010 as a military and civilian decoration, and also continues to be awarded as a dynastic order by the former royal family.
Singapore	Bintang Temasek ribbon (from 1996)	Bintang Temasek	Established 24 July 1970		Singapore's highest national honour, awarded only to members of the Armed Forces, Police Force, and Civil Defence Force. Recipients are entitled to the post-nominal letters BT.
Somalia		Order of the Somali Star	12 February 1961		Highest distinction award for military gallantry of Somalia.
South Africa	Ribbon - Nkwe ya Gauta	Nkwe ya Gauta - Golden Leopard	Established 2003		Introduced to replace the Honoris Crux Gold. The bilingual title is in Sesotho and English.
South Korea	Taeguk Cordon Medal	Order of Military Merit (Taegeuk class)			
Spain		Laureate Cross of Saint Ferdinand	1 January 1812	336	
Sri Lanka	Parama veera vibhushanaya	Parama Weera Vibhushanaya	1991	31	Established in 1981. Recipients can use the post-nominal letters PWV.
Sweden	Svardsorden	Order of the Sword	1748		Dormant between 1975 and February 2023, when it was re-introduced. During this time the Medal of Merit was the highest decoration awarded for action during combat.
Switzerland	CHE CdA decoration	Award Ribbon for Exceptional Service			Swiss law has prohibited citizens from accepting honours and titles since 1848; however, the Swiss military maintains a system of awards. Length of service decorations precede the exceptional service ribbon in the order of wear.
Taiwan (Republic of China)	The Order of National Glory Awarded to Chiang Kai-Shek	Order of National Glory	Established 8 November 1937		
Tanzania	Medal for Bravery (Tanzania) - ribbon bar	Medal for Bravery			
Thailand		Order of Rama	Established 22 July 1918		Conferred in six classes for military merit.
Turkey	TURKISH ARMED FORCES MEDAL OF HONOUR	Medal of Honor	1967		
Uganda	Order of Katonga (Uganda) - ribbon bar	Order of Katonga	2004	2	Awarded only twice; first to Muammar Gaddafi in 2004, and posthumously to Julius Nyerere in 2007.
Ukraine	Gold star116	Hero of Ukraine	26 November 1998	692	Highest national title that can be conferred by the President of Ukraine, granted to recipients of the civilian Order of the State and the military Order of the Gold Star
Ukraine	Medal of Golden Star Ukraine	Order of the Gold Star			Highest military order of Ukraine, awarded alongside the honorary title Hero of Ukraine.
United Kingdom		The Victoria Cross	26 June 1857	1357; 1354	
United Kingdom		Order of the Bath	18 May 1725		Second highest national order of the United Kingdom. It is conferred on both civilians and military personnel, with different insignia (Military illustrated).
United States		Medal of Honor	26 March 1863	3468; 3449	Different types from each of the branches of the US military. In the image, from left to right: The Army, the Coast Guard/Navy/Marine Corps, and the Air Force.
Uruguay	Medalla al Merito Militar Oficial	Medal of Military Merit	Established 1991		Introduced to replace the Order of Military Merit of the Companions of Artigas, which was discontinued in 1985.
Vietnam	AHLLVTND2	Hero of the People's Armed Forces	Established 1955		State Honourable Title awarded for outstanding achievements in combat, combat service, preservation of security, social order and safety, loyalty to the socialist Fatherland of Vietnam and possession of revolutionary virtues and qualities.
Vietnam	HCQC1	The Military Exploit Order	15 May 1947		Highest military Order, awarded to individuals who have recorded outstanding and brave exploits in combat, combat service, training, force building, consolidation of the all-people defense and people's security, or have sacrificed their lives heroically, setting bright examples in the whole country.
Zimbabwe		The Gold Cross of Zimbabwe	Established October 1980	3	Replaced the Grand Cross of Valour

== See also ==
- List of military decorations
- List of highest civilian awards by country
- List of wound decorations by country
