= Commemorative Medal for Advancing Latvia's Membership to NATO =

Latvian military award

Commemorative Medal for Advancing Latvia’s Accession to NATO Piemiņas medaļa „Sekmējot Latvijas dalību NATO”
- Type: Medal
- Awarded for: Advancing Latvia's membership to NATO
- Country: Latvia
- Presented by: the Ministry of Defence
- Status: No Longer Awarded
- Established: March 19, 2004

Highlights
- Total: 740
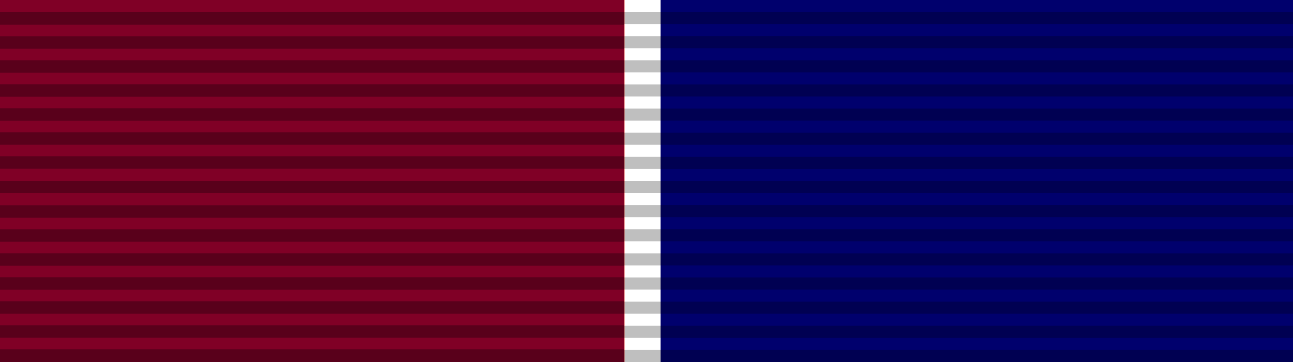
- Ribbon bar of the medal

Commemorative Medal for Advancing Latvia’s Accession to NATO (Latvian: Piemiņas medaļa „Sekmējot Latvijas dalību NATO”) is an award of the Minister of Defence of Latvia. It was established on 19 March 2004 due to the admission of the Republic of Latvia to the North Atlantic Treaty Organisation.

The medal is awarded to express gratitude for the person's contribution to the development of the Latvian defence by advancing Latvia's membership to NATO.

The medal is a round-shaped medal made in bronze – diameter: 38 mm; depth: 3 mm. The medal's averse contains a carved image of the NATO's symbol - the four-pointed star - surrounded by decorative beams. There is a 2 mm belt around the medal's perimeter on its both sides – averse and reverse. There is an inscription – SEKMĒJOT LATVIJAS DALĪBU NATO (for Advancing Latvia’s Accession to NATO) – in the centre of the medal's reverse, and a circular inscription – AIZSARDZĪBAS MINISTRA APBALVOJUMS (Minister of Defence Award) – at the edge of the medal's reverse.

The medal is suspended on a 32 mm wide and 50 mm long ribbon, which is formed of a 15 mm belt in the red colour of the Latvian flag (carmine) symbolizing Latvia, a 15 mm belt in the colour of blue symbolising NATO and a 2 mm wide silver stripe in the middle symbolising justice, fairness and loyalty.

The by-law on the commemorative medal stipulates that the medal, when worn, should be placed after the awards of the state and the Minister of Defence. Military personnel wear a 10 mm ribbon on their daily uniforms, or a 15 mm wide and a 3 mm high tack-ribbon in the bow-tie shape on their civil clothes. Civilians wear only the tack-ribbon in the bow-tie shape on their everyday clothes.

Currently, there are 740 persons awarded with the medal being Latvian and foreign officials, staff of the Ministry of Defence and the Ministry of Foreign Affairs, NAF soldiers, foreign military personnel, public organisation representatives and others.

== Recipients ==
- Hans Jesper Helsø
- Timothy A. Kinnan
- Benk Korthals
- Ģirts Valdis Kristovskis
- Dzintars Rasnačs
- Edgars Rinkēvičs
- Robert A. Wright

== See also ==
- Commemorative Medal for Participants of the Barricades of 1991
- Awards and decorations of Latvia
