= Order of Military Merit (Morocco) =

Moroccan military award

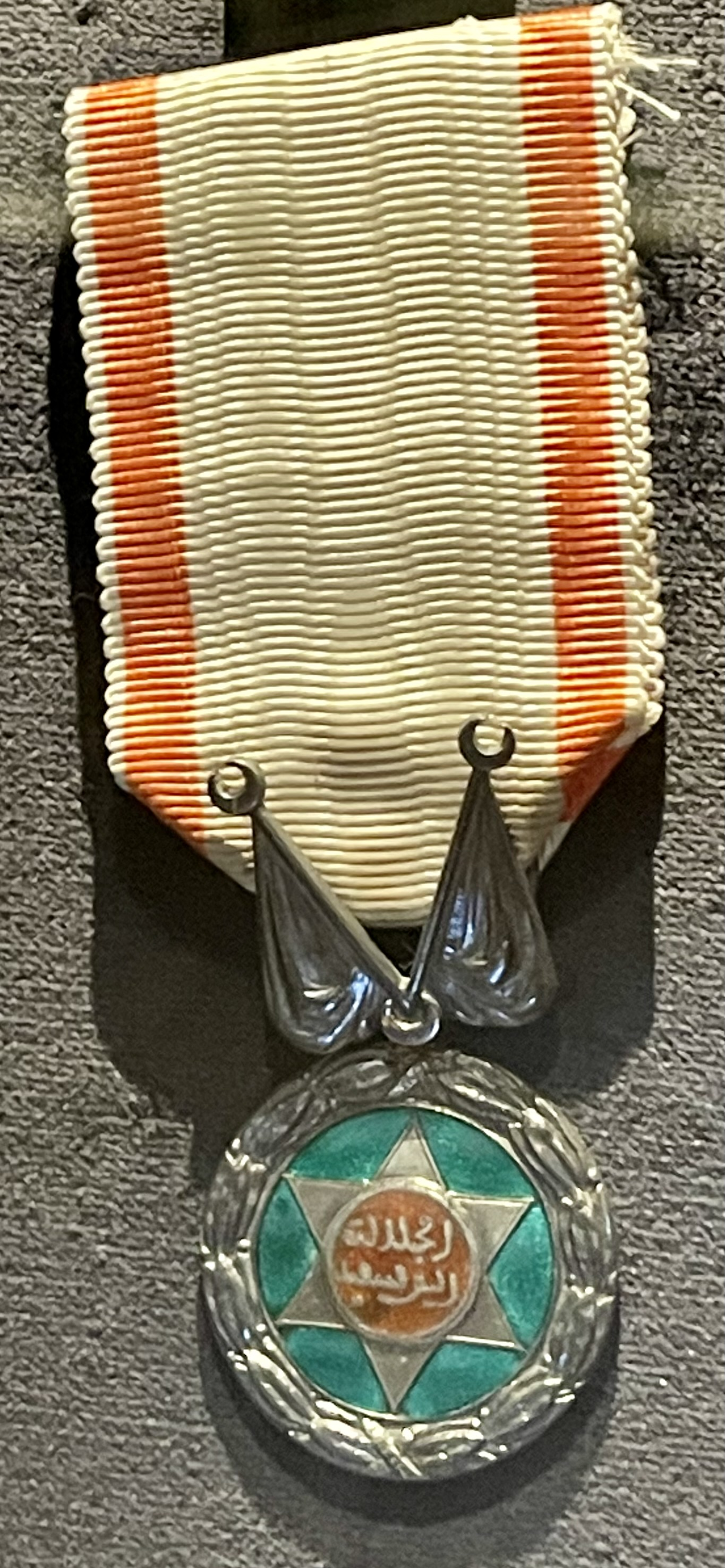
- Order of Military Merit from 1913

Awarded by The King of Morocco
- Type: order
- Established: 7 August 1910
- Country: Morocco
- Status: active
- Founder: Abdelhafid of Morocco
- Ribbon of the order

The Order of Military Merit (Arabic: Wisam al-Istihqaq al-Askari) is a Moroccan military award founded in 1910 by Sultan Mulay Abdelhafid, and reconstituted under its present name in 1976 by King Hassan II. It is awarded for eminent and meritorious military services. There are five classes - Grand Cordon, and First to Fourth Class - each limited to a stated number of recipients.

== Order of the Military (1910–1963) ==
Wissam al-Askari ("The Order of the Military") was founded by Sultan Mulay Abdelhafid of Morocco on 7 August 1910. It was a decoration for military personnel in times of war or on active service and for gallantry under fire. It was made obsolete on 16 May 1963 after the signing of Morocco's first constitution.

== Sharifian Order of Military Merit (1966–1976) ==
Revived and expanded by King Hassan II as the Wisam al-Istihqaq al-Askari al-Sharifiya or "Sharifian (Royal) Order of Military Merit", on 14 December 1966. It was created to recognise eminent and meritorious military services by senior commander and officers of the armed forces, police and auxiliary services in positions of command, training or the preparation of national defence.

Awarded in five classes:

- Grand Cordon – Limited to ten recipients at any one time. Granted as a breast star and a sash with pendant badge.
- First Class (Grand Officer) – Limited to thirty recipients. Granted as a medal pendant from a neck ribbon.
- Second Class (Commander) – Limited to one hundred and fifty recipients.
- Third Class (Officer) – Limited to five hundred recipients.
- Fourth Class (Knight) – Limited to five thousand recipients.

It was reorganized again on 12 April 1976 into a single class decoration and returned to a status broadly in line with the original Order of the Military. It is now restricted to awards during times of war for acts of gallantry and exceptional military services by non-commissioned officers and men of the Moroccan military and police services. The decoration may also be conferred on general officers for exceptional leadership during times of war, provided their services to date have already received recognition with appointment to the Order of the Throne.

== Order of Military Merit (1976–present) ==
Wissam al-Istihkak al-Askari ("the Order of Military Merit") was founded by King Hassan II on 12 April 1976 to replace the senior classes of the older Sharifian Order of Military Merit on its re-organization. Conferred for eminent and meritorious military services by officers of the armed forces including positions of command, training or the preparation of national defence. The fourth class may be conferred on NCOs, ordinary soldiers and agents of the police and auxiliary service for acts of bravery in the course of security operations or the maintenance of law and order.

Awarded in five classes:

- Grand Cordon – Limited to ten recipients at any one time.
- First Class (Grand Officer) – Limited to thirty recipients.
- Second Class (Commander) – Limited to one hundred and fifty recipients.
- Third Class (Officer) – Limited to five hundred recipients.
- Fourth Class (Knight) – Limited to five thousand recipients.
