= Orders, decorations, and medals of Lesotho =

The following is a list of orders, decorations, and medals of the Kingdom of Lesotho. These awards were founded by King Mosheshoe II in 1972 as the principal orders of the kingdom. The Lesotho orders were created with considerable advice from Sir Conrad Swann, Garter King-at-Arms, who was also responsible for advising on the establishment of the Commonwealth honours systems around the world such as the Order of Canada and the New Zealand's Queen's Service Order.

== Order of Moshoeshoe ==
The Order of Moshoeshoe is sometimes referred to as the Order of Dignity.

== Order of Lesotho ==
The Order of Lesotho is awarded for exceptional services by citizens and foreigners.

== Order of Mohlomi ==
The Order of Mohlomi is awarded for achievement in the fields of community and social service. Sometimes referred to as the Order of Achievement. Chief Mohlomi was a sage and the greater healer of his time, who died in 1814.

== Order of Ramatseatsane ==
The Order of Ramatseatsane is awarded for distinguished service by members of the public service, armed forced and police. Jan Steyn was a recipient of this award. Sometimes referred to as the Distinguished Service Order. (Abraham) Ramatseatsane was Moshoeshoe's counsellor.

== Order of Makoanyane ==
The Order of Makoanyane is awarded for acts of extreme bravery. Sometimes referred to as the Order of Bravery. (Joshua) Makoanyane was Moshoeshoe's companion as a youth and later his military commander (warrior hero).
