= Kiribati Grand Order =

Kiribati's highest honour

Kiribati Grand Order Ana Tokabeti Kiribati

Awarded by Kiribati
- Type: Order
- Established: 1 June 1989; 35 years ago
- Country: Kiribati
- Ribbon: Blue with yellow edges and a red central stripe with white edges
- Criteria: Former presidents of Kiribati who have served at least two full terms; others deemed deserving
- Status: Currently constituted
- Founder: Ieremia Tabai
- Classes: Single-class
- Post-nominals: A.T.K.

Statistics
- First induction: 1992

Precedence
- Next (higher): None
- Next (lower): Kiribati National Order
- Ribbon bar of the Kiribati Grand Order

The reverse side bears the coat of arms of Kiribati and the obverse has the frigatebird.

The Kiribati Grand Order (KGO; Gilbertese: Ana Tokabeti Kiribati, post-nominals A.T.K.) is the highest honour of Kiribati. The order was founded in 1989 under President Ieremia Tabai by the Presidential Act of 1 June 1989 (Kiribati National Honours and Awards Act 1989) which established the Kiribati honours system.

The order can be conferred upon "former Beretitenti [presidents of Kiribati] who have served a minimum of two full presidential terms. It may also be bestowed or conferred upon such other persons who in the opinion of the [Kiribati National Honours and Awards] Commission deserve to be bestowed or conferred with such Order." Past recipients include Ieremia Tabai, three-time president of Kiribati (the first inductee, 1992), and John Hilary Smith, former Governor of the Gilbert Islands before it became Kiribati (2009). Nominations to the order are made on 12 July, the national day of Kiribati. The Kiribati National Honours and Awards Commission conducts the selection of candidates but the conferment of the order is a prerogative of the president of Kiribati, who may also revoke membership in the order.

The Kiribati Grand Order is classified as one of four civil awards in the Kiribati honours system, the remaining two being reserved for members of the disciplined forces. Ranking immediately below the Kiribati Grand Order in the civil category is the Kiribati National Order.

The insignia of the order is a gilt medal that is 3.2 centimetres (1.3 in) in diameter. The medal is suspended from a straight bar that is attached to the ribbon. The ribbon is blue and has yellow edges and a red central stripe with white edges. The obverse side of the medal features the name of the order inscribed in Gilbertese, ANA TOKABETI KIRIBATI, and a male frigatebird on a branch whose inflated throat pouch is enamelled in red. The same frigatebird, in flight, is featured in the coat of arms of Kiribati, which is replicated in full on the reverse side of the medal. The outer edges of the medal on the obverse side feature a pattern of alternating points of a compass rose and ocean waves.

In 2022 the office of the president of Kiribati announced a competition to re-name and re-design all of Kiribati's honours including the Kiribati Grand Order.

== See also ==
- Orders, decorations, and medals of Kiribati
- List of highest civilian awards by country
