= Hans Jesper Helsø =

Danish general

Hans Jesper Helsø S.K.
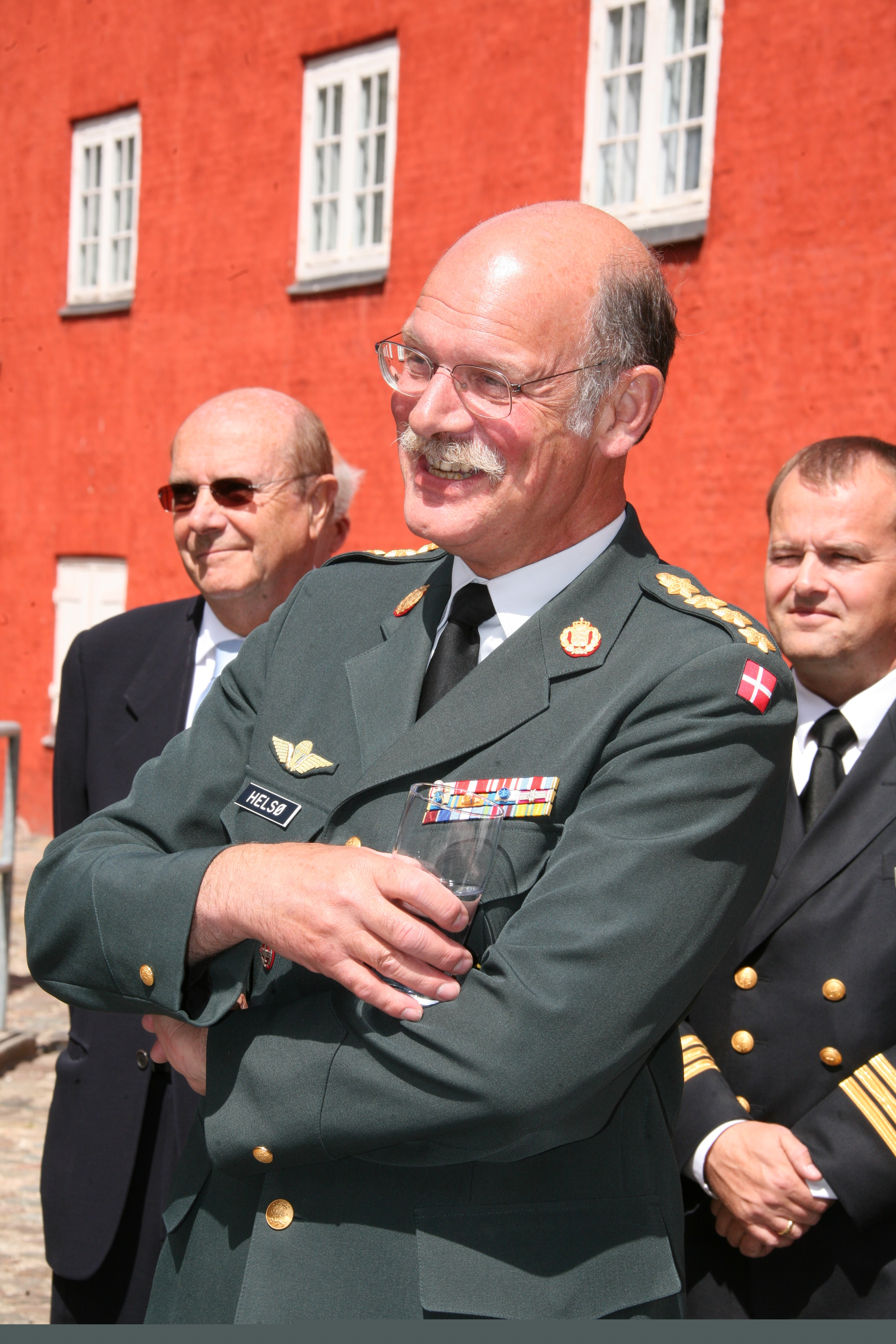
- Helsø at his retirement party in 2008
- Born: 9 July 1948 (age 78); Copenhagen, Denmark
- Military career
- Allegiance: Denmark
- Branch: Royal Danish Army
- Service years: 1968-2008 (40 years)
- Rank: General
- Awards: Commander of the Order of the Dannebrog

Hans Jesper Helsø (born July 9, 1948), is a former Danish Chief of Defence.

Helsø served his conscription in 1968 and initially became sergeant and officer of the reserve. In 1974 he becomes lieutenant and served the following four years at King's Artillery Regiment. In 1982-83 he is - as a captain - at the General Staff Course in the United States. In 1990 he was appointed Lieutenant Colonel and come back to the artillery as Head of Department for a few years. After a short staff service at the Army Operational Command, he became Head of the King's Artillery Regiment between 1994 and 1996. In 2000-02, he is Chief of the Army Operational Command, and then Chief of Operations and Planning Staffs until his appointment as Chief of Defence. In August 2008 Helsø reached the army's age-limit and was replaced by Tim Sloth Jørgensen.

His service has been supplemented with a few international missions; first in Cyprus (UNFICYP) in 1979 and then UNPROFOR in the Balkans in 1995.

In 2002 - a few months before planned - Helsø had to step in as Chief of Defence as a result of Christian Hvidt's early resignation. His period as Chief of Defence is marked by the Defence moving from being a mobilization defense to be a conscription based professional defense, in which overseas missions form a significant part of the effort. The planning of this change occurred in the Defence's own management and is described in the episode K-notatet in the TV series Magtens Billeder.

After his time as Chief of Defense Helsø engaged in organizations related to the military, including as a member of Soldier Scholarship Award Committee and on the board of the YMCA Soldiers Mission.

Helsø is married and has four children.

== Awards and decorations ==
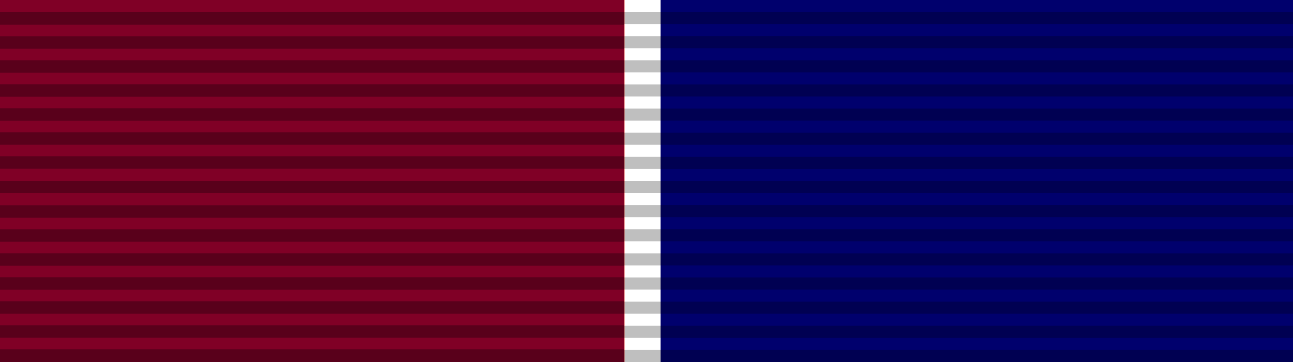
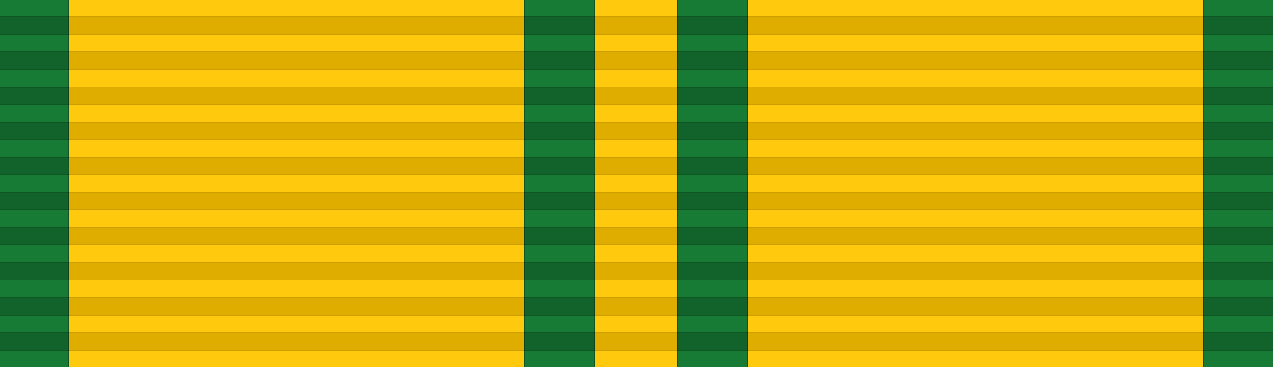
Grand Cross of the Order of Dannebrog
25 Years of Good Service (Denmark)
The Reserve Officers Association of Denmark Medal of Honor
Peace Prize Medal, (Denmark)
Grand Officer of National Order of Merit, (France)
Grand Cross of the Order the Eagle, (Estonia)
Commander of the Legion of Merit, (USA)
Commemorative Medal for Advancing Latvia's Membership to NATO, (Latvia)
UN Medal for UNFICYP
UN Medal for UNPROFOR
Nijmegen Cross

Other Accoutrements
Parachutist Badge
Pistol Badge Badge (Gold)
Rifle Badge (Gold)
Sub-machine Gun Badge (Silver)
Light Machine Gun Badge (Silver)
Combat Swimming Skill Badge (Silver)
First Aid Skill Badge (Bronze)

Military offices
Preceded by Christian Hvidt	Chief of Defence; 2002-2008	Succeeded by Tim Sloth Jørgensen
