= List of recipients of the Order of the Liberator General San Martín =

Here is a classification of the most notable recipients of the Order of the Liberator General San Martín, the highest order of the Republic of Argentina.
Mainly Heads of State, members of Royal families & international VIPs

== Grades ==
1. Collar (Spanish: Collar)
2. Grand Cross (Spanish: Gran Cruz)
3. Grand Officer (Spanish: Gran Oficial)
4. Commander (Spanish: Comendador)
5. Officer (Spanish: Oficial)
6. Knight (Spanish: Caballero)

== Recipients ==
=== Royal Houses ===
- King Albert II of Belgium
- King Baudouin of Belgium
- King Philippe of Belgium
- King Abdullah of Saudi Arabia
- King Rama IX of Thailand
- King Carl XVI Gustaf of Sweden
- Queen Margrethe II of Denmark
- Queen Juliana of the Netherlands
- Queen Elizabeth II of the United Kingdom
- Queen Letizia of Spain
- Queen Silvia of Sweden
- King Felipe VI of Spain
- King Juan Carlos I of Spain
- King Olav V of Norway
- Princess Marina, Duchess of Kent
- Princess Benedikte of Denmark
- Prince Philip, Duke of Edinburgh
- Prince Bernhard of the Netherlands
- Prince Bhanubandhu Yugala
- Shāhanshāh Mohammad Reza of Iran
- Šahbānū Farah of Iran

=== Politicians ===
- Konrad Adenauer, Chancellor of Germany
- Carmelo Angulo Barturen, Diplomat
- Corazón Aquino, 11th President of the Philippines
- Fra' Andrew Bertie, 78th Prince and Grand Master of the Sovereign Military Order of Malta
- Carlos Bianchi Chelech, Vice President of the Chilean Senate
- Theo van Boven, Lawyer
- Francisco Bustillo, Uruguayan Ambassador to Argentina
- Rafael Caldera, President of Venezuela
- Cuauhtémoc Cárdenas, 1st Head of Government of México City
- Antonio Carrillo Flores, Secretary of Finance of Mexico
- Elena Ceaușescu, Deputy Prime Minister of Romania
- Nicolae Ceaușescu, President of Romania
- Camilo José Cela, 1989 Nobel Prize in literature
- Rafael Correa, President of Ecuador
- Peter Cosgrove, Governor-General of Australia
- Francesco Cossiga, 8th President of Italy
- Nouhak Phoumsavanh, President of Laos
- Celso Humberto Delgado, Mexican Ambassador to Argentina
- Sukarno, 1st President of Indonesia
- Otto Eléspuru, General Commander of the Peruvian Army
- Enrico Calamai, Italian Consul to Argentina
- Patricia Espinosa, Secretary of Foreign Affairs of Mexico
- Gerardo Fernández Albor, President of the Xunta of Galicia
- José Figueres Ferrer, President of Costa Rica
- Vicente Fox, President of Mexico
- José García-Margallo y Marfil, Secretary of Foreign Affairs and Cooperation of Spain
- Licio Gelli, Venerable Master of the Propaganda Due
- José Goñi, Minister of National Defense of Chile
- Rafiq Hariri, Prime Minister of Lebanon
- Václav Havel, 1st President of the Czech Republic
- François Hollande, President of France
- Carlos Ibáñez del Campo 20th President of Chile
- Helio Jaguaribe, Secretary of Science and Technology of Brazil
- Ban Ki-moon, 8th Secretary-General of the United Nations
- Jean de Lattre de Tassigny, French military, Commander in WWI and WWII
- Hipólito Mejía, President of the Dominican Republic
- Marshall Meyer, American Rabbi, Human Rights activist, member of the National Commission on the Disappearance of Persons
- Patricia Derian, Assistant Secretary of State for Democracy, Human Rights, and Labor of the United States
- Chester Nimitz, American Admiral
- Luis Ortiz Monasterio
- José María Otero de Navascués
- Andrés Pastrana
- Ricardo Patiño
- Antonio Patriota
- Gregorio Peces-Barba
- Enrique Peña Nieto
- Eva Perón
- Juan Domingo Perón (Collar)
- Augusto Pinochet (Revoked on 7 September 2023 by President Alberto Fernández.)
- Michel Platini
- Augusto Roa Bastos
- Alí Rodríguez Araque
- Joaquín Ruiz-Giménez Cortés
- Sabah Al-Ahmad Al-Jaber Al-Sabah, Kuwaiti Emir.
- Julio María Sanguinetti
- Martin Schulz
- Haile Selassie
- Alfredo Stroessner
- Franjo Tuđman
- Rafael Leónidas Trujillo
- Pablo Zala
- Noah Mamet, United States of America Ambassador to Argentina.
- Ramtane Lamamra, Minister of Foreign Affairs of Algeria.
- Xi Jinping, President of the People's Republic of China.
- Nicolás Maduro, President of the Bolivarian Republic of Venezuela. (Revoked on 11 August 2017 by President Mauricio Macri.)
