= Orders, decorations, and medals of the Czech Republic =

Recognitions awarded by the President of the Czech Republic

State decorations of the Czech Republic recognize outstanding acts of service to the Czech Republic. They are awarded by the President of the Czech Republic, usually, but not necessarily, on the recommendation of the Chamber of Deputies, the Senate or the Prime Minister of the Czech Republic. They may also be promulgated solely on the president's authority. They come in two varieties: orders being the higher honor and medals the lower.

== History ==
As originally envisioned by the constitution in 1992, the president had little more than a ceremonial role with respect to state decorations. Article 63 promulgated an order or an award on the recommendation of the government, as expressed by the signature of the Prime Minister. The constitution did not clearly give the president a way to refuse such a referral, unless it came to him by way of a law to be enacted, thus subject to his veto. Nothing in the constitution suggests that a recommendation for decoration be voted on by parliament.

Article 63 allows for the president to be granted powers by a lesser law to "exercise powers not explicitly defined in the Constitutional Act". Such a law came into effect in 1994, which allowed for the president to award state decorations on his own authority. It also seemed to multiply the legislative routes by which a person could be recommended for an award. As a consequence of this 1994 change, the Senate, the Chamber of Deputies, the Government, or the President can all recommend a person to receive a decorations. In any of these cases, however, it is still the responsibility of the president, or his designee, to actually present the award.

The Act on the State Decorations of the Czech Republic 1994 codifies what are the orders and medals capable of being conferred or awarded. Annexes (or amendments) to the Act instructed that the designs for the insignia associated with the state decorations should be chosen following a public competition.

By law, insignia for all state decorations are individually numbered, and accompanied by a matching numbered certificate.

== Bestowal rules ==
The Order is conferred upon citizens of the Czech Republic and awarded to persons who are not citizens of the Czech Republic.

After the demise of a holder of an order who was a Czech citizen his/her numbered insignia of the order is returned to the Office of the President of the Republic. After the demise of a person who has been decorated with a medal or the demise of a holder of an order who was not a citizen of the Czech Republic the survivors will keep both the insignia and the certificate on the award. If there are no survivors the insignia and the certificate will be returned to the Office of the President.

By law, President of the Czech Republic is entitled to the class I insignia of this order; after leaving the office, the order may be conferred upon him for life by a joint resolution of the Chamber of Deputies and the Senate.

The days designated for the bestowal of decorations is January 1 and October 28. By tradition the president presents the honors and awards in the evening of October 28 during a ceremony held at the Prague Castle.

== State decorations ==
- Order of the White Lion
- Order of Tomáš Garrigue Masaryk
- Medal of Heroism
- Medal of Merit

== Law enforcement decorations ==
=== Decorations of the Law enforcement in the Czech Republic ===
- Police of the Czech Republic
- Fire Rescue Service of the Czech Republic
- Customs Administration of the Czech Republic
- Prison Service of the Czech Republic
- General Inspection of Security Forces
- Security Information Service
- Office of Foreign Relations and Informations

== Commemorative medals ==
- Medal of Karel Kramář

=== Awards of the Ministry of Foreign Affairs ===
- Medal for Services to Diplomacy
- Gratias Agit Award

=== Awards of the Ministry of Transport ===
- Medal of the Ministry of Transport

=== Awards of the Ministry of Industry and Trade ===
- Medal of the Minister of Industry and Trade

=== Awards of the Ministry of Culture ===
- Artis Bohemiae Amicis

=== Awards of the Ministry of Interior ===
- Medal for Services to Czech Archiving

=== Awards of the Ministry of Education, Youth and Sports ===
- Medal of the Ministry of Education, Youth and Sports

=== Parliamentary awards ===
- Silver Medal of the President of the Senate
- Silver Medal of the President of the Chamber of Deputies
