= Orders, decorations, and medals of the United States =

Orders, decorations, and medals of the United States may refer to:

- Awards and decorations of the National Oceanic and Atmospheric Administration
- Awards and decorations of the Public Health Service
- Awards and decorations of the United States Armed Forces
- Awards and decorations of the United States Department of Homeland Security
- United States law enforcement decorations
- Awards and decorations of the United States government, civilian awards given by the U.S. federal government
- Awards and decorations of the United States Merchant Marine, civilian decorations given by the United States Merchant Marine

== See also ==
- Lists of civil awards and decorations of the United States
