= Orders, decorations, and medals of Burundi =

The Burundian Honours System consists of orders and medals awarded for exemplary service to the nation.

== Orders ==
Ribbon	Order	Classes
	National Order of the Republic (French: Ordre National de la République)	Grand Collar (French: Grand Collier)
	National Order of the Republic (French: Ordre National de la République)	Grand Cordon (French: Grand Cordon)
	National Order of the Republic (French: Ordre National de la République)	Grand Officer (French: Grand Officier)
	National Order of the Republic (French: Ordre National de la République)	Commander (French: Commandeur)
	National Order of the Republic (French: Ordre National de la République)	Officer (French: Officier)
	National Order of the Republic (French: Ordre National de la République)	Knight (French: Chevalier)
	Order of the Peoples Friendship (French: Ordre de l'Amitié des Peuples)	Grand Officer (French: Grand Officier)
	Order of the Peoples Friendship (French: Ordre de l'Amitié des Peuples)	Commander (French: Commandeur)
	Order of the Peoples Friendship (French: Ordre de l'Amitié des Peuples)	Officer (French: Officier)
	Order of the Peoples Friendship (French: Ordre de l'Amitié des Peuples)	Knight (French: Chevalier)
	Order of Patriotic Merit (French: Ordre du Mérite Patriotique)	Grand Officer (French: Grand Officier)
	Order of Patriotic Merit (French: Ordre du Mérite Patriotique)	Commander (French: Commandeur)
	Order of Patriotic Merit (French: Ordre du Mérite Patriotique)	Officer (French: Officier)
	Order of Patriotic Merit (French: Ordre du Mérite Patriotique)	Knight (French: Chevalier)
	Order of Patriotic Merit (French: Ordre du Mérite Patriotique)	Gold Medal (French: Médaille d'Or)
	Order of Patriotic Merit (French: Ordre du Mérite Patriotique)	Silver Medal (French: Médaille d'Argent)
	Order of Patriotic Merit (French: Ordre du Mérite Patriotique)	Bronze Medal (French: Médaille de Bronze)
	Order of Civic Merit (French: Ordre du Mérite Civique)	Grand Officer (French: Grand Officier)
	Order of Civic Merit (French: Ordre du Mérite Civique)	Commander (French: Commandeur)
	Order of Civic Merit (French: Ordre du Mérite Civique)	Officer (French: Officier)
	Order of Civic Merit (French: Ordre du Mérite Civique)	Knight (French: Chevalier)
	Order of Civic Merit (French: Ordre du Mérite Civique)	Gold Medal (French: Médaille d'Or)
	Order of Civic Merit (French: Ordre du Mérite Civique)	Silver Medal (French: Médaille d'Argent)
	Order of Civic Merit (French: Ordre du Mérite Civique)	Bronze Medal (French: Médaille de Bronze)
	Order of Merit for Work (French: Ordre du Mérite du Travail)	Grand Officer (French: Grand Officier)
	Order of Merit for Work (French: Ordre du Mérite du Travail)	Commander (French: Commandeur)
	Order of Merit for Work (French: Ordre du Mérite du Travail)	Officer (French: Officier)
	Order of Merit for Work (French: Ordre du Mérite du Travail)	Knight (French: Chevalier)
	Order of Merit for Work (French: Ordre du Mérite du Travail)	Gold Medal (French: Médaille d'Or)
	Order of Merit for Work (French: Ordre du Mérite du Travail)	Silver Medal (French: Médaille d'Argent)
	Order of Merit for Work (French: Ordre du Mérite du Travail)	Bronze Medal (French: Médaille de Bronze)
