= National Order of Merit (Algeria) =

Algerian order

- Badge of the Order

Awarded by President of Algeria
- Type: Order of merit
- Awarded for: eminent civil, military or public service to the nation, and for exceptional service in the cause of the revolution.
- Status: Order of merit
- President of Algeria
- Grades: 6 (3 classes of 'Dignity' and commander, officer and knight).

Precedence
- Next (higher): None
- Next (lower): Medal for Martyrs of the War of National Liberation

The National Order of Merit (Arabic: مصف الاستحقاق الوطني) is an order of merit awarded for all manner of services to Algeria. It was instituted 2 January 1984 and is quite complex, with three classes of 'Dignity' (each with collar, sash with badge and star), as well as Commander, Officer and Knight grades.

== Recipients ==
Sadr

- Ahmed Ben Bella
- Houari Boumédiène (posthumously)
- Rabah Bitat
- Ali Kafi
- Abdelmadjid Tebboune, December 19, 2019
- Abdelkader Bensalah, December 19, 2019
- Ahmed Gaid Salah, December 19, 2019

Athir

Foreign personalities:

- Jean-Luc de Cabrières, French writer, December 3, 2000
- Émile Lahoud, President of the Lebanese Republic, July 23, 2002
- Juan Carlos I, King of Spain, October 2, 2002
- Thomas Klestil, Federal President of the Republic of Austria, June 14, 2003
- Rudolf Schuster, President of the Slovak Republic, June 14, 2003
- Jorge Sampaio, President of the Portuguese Republic, December 2, 2003
- Joaquim Chissano, President of the Republic of Mozambique, December 9, 2004
- Fatima bint Mubarak Al Ketbi, President of the General Union of Women of the State of the United Arab Emirates, March 16, 2005
- Alejandro Toledo, President of the Republic of Peru, May 7, 2005
- Ricardo Lagos, President of the Republic of Chile, May 7, 2005
- Luiz Inácio Lula da Silva, President of the Federative Republic of Brazil, February 7, 2006
- Roh Moo-hyun, President of the Republic of Korea, March 11, 2006
- Mohamed ElBaradei, Egyptian Director of the IAEA, January 7, 2007
- László Sólyom, President of the Republic of Hungary, June 2, 2007
- Hazza bin Zayed bin Sultan Al Nahyan, National Security Advisor to the UAE President, October 17, 2007
- Costa-Gavras, Greek-French film director and screenwriter, 4 November 2018
- Kais Saied, President of Tunisia, February 2, 2020
- Sergio Mattarella, President of Italy, November 6, 2021
- Abdullah II, King of Jordan, December 2022
- Marcelo Rebelo de Sousa, President of Portugal, May 23, 2023
- Haitham bin Tariq, Sultan of Oman, October 29, 2024
- Cyril Ramaphosa, President of South Africa, December 7, 2024
- Recep Tayyip Erdoğan, President of Turkey, 7 May 2026

Algerian personalities:

- Slimane Amirat, Mujahideen, July 22, 1992 (posthumously)
- Warda Al-Jazairia, Singer, November 1, 2004
- Aïssat Idir, Trade unionist, February 20, 2006 (posthumously)
- Abdelhak Benhamouda, Trade unionist, February 20, 2006 (posthumously)
- Zinedine Zidane, French footballer, December 11, 2006
- Smaïn Lamari, Major-General, September 11, 2007 (posthumously)
- M'Hamed El Anka, Singer, July 4, 2009 (posthumously)
- Fadhéla Dziria, Singer, July 4, 2009 (posthumously)
- Mustapha Kateb, Writer, July 4, 2009
- Bachir Mentouri, Physician, July 4, 2009
- Salah Goudjil, Politician, May 26, 2025

Achir

- Roger Hanin, French actor, December 3, 2000
- Algeria national football team, Winners of the 2019 Africa Cup of Nations, July 21, 2019
- Amar Bendjama, permanent representative to the UN, September 26th, 2025

== See also ==
- Orders, decorations, and medals of Algeria
