= Medal of Heroism (Czech Republic) =

Medal of Heroism Medaile Za Hrdinství
- Obverse of the Medal of Heroism
- Type: Decoration
- Awarded for: heroism in combat or deeds aimed at saving other human lives or substantial material values with significant risk of death
- Country: Czech Republic
- Eligibility: Czech civilians and military members
- Status: Currently awarded
- Ribbon bars of the award left – ČSFR (1990-92) right – ČR (since 1994)

Precedence
- Next (higher): Order of Tomáš Garrigue Masaryk
- Next (lower): Medal of Merit

The Medal of Heroism (Czech: Medaile Za hrdinství) is principally a military award, but has occasionally been awarded to civilians. It rewards acts of "heroism in combat" or those "deeds aimed at saving other human lives or substantial material values" which put the recipient at significant risk of death. It is unique amongst current Czech decorations in that it has only a single grade or class. The medal was designed by Erna Masarovičová.

== Appearance ==
The medal is a simple breast ribbon, primarily gold in color, but with three equal-width stripes running the vertical length of the ribbon. From left to right, the colors of the stripes are white, red and blue. Suspended from this ribbon is a silver medal, bearing the Greater Coat of Arms of the Czech Republic on one side, and a symbol representing heroism (double-tailed lion) on the other with an inscription "za hrdinství" ("of/for heroism").

== History ==
The Medal of Heroism predates the Czech Republic, having been created in 1990 by the Parliament of the Czechoslovak Federative Republic in 1990. However, the distinction was only awarded once prior to its reauthorization by the Czech Republic in 1992. There are additional recipients after 1992, most notably during the events of the 2014 Bagram Airfield bombing, after which 5 Czech soldiers were posthumously awarded the medal for their actions in support of the war in Afghanistan.
