= Orders, decorations, and medals of Somalia =

Order of the Somali Star
- Type: Order
- Awarded for: Military gallantry or exceptional service to Somalia
- Presented by: President of Somalia
- Eligibility: Somali military and civilian personnel, foreign citizens
- Status: Currently awarded

This is a list of the Orders, Medals and Ribbon awards of the

Federal Republic of Somalia, of which the honours system consists of orders and medals awarded for exemplary service to the nation.

== Order of the Somali Star ==
The title of Order of the Somali Star can be awarded for military gallantry in the service of Somalia. It can be awarded to both civilian and military personnel. The title can also be awarded posthumously if the heroic act costs the recipient his or her life. It may also be awarded to foreign citizens who display exceptional service to the Somali republic, The President of Somalia is the main conferring authority of the award although the Federal Parliament may nominate individuals for the President's consideration.

=== Description ===
The award comes in grades with the Order of the Leopard (formerly the Knight of the Grand Cross changed due to the adoption of Islam as the state religion) which gold-plated badge to be worn on the band and gold-plated plate to be worn on the left chest; Grand Officer, silver badge to be worn on a ribbon around the neck and plaque to be worn on the left chest; Commander, silver badge to be worn on a ribbon around the neck; Officer, silver badge to be worn on a ribbon with a rosette on the chest; Knight, silver badge to be worn on a ribbon on the chest.

== Awards ==
Orders:

- Order of the Somali Star

Medals:

- Medal for the War with Ethiopia
- Foundation of the Supreme Revolutionary Council Medal
- Medal for Military Valour
- Medal for Military Service
- Medal for the Ogaden War

Orders and Medals	Acronym
Order of the Somali Star	OSS
Somali National Army Order of Honor	SNAOH
National Liberation Medal	NLM
Gold Medal for Bravery and Service	GMBS
Order of Bravery Medal	OBM
Exemplary Performance Medal	EPM
Defence Superior Service Medal	DSSM
Joint Command Superior Medal	JCSM
Land Forces Superior Service Medal	LFSSM
Navy Forces Superior Service Medal	NFSSM
Air Forces Superior Service Medal	AFSSM
Long Service and Good Conduct Order	LSGCO
Distinguished Conduct Order	DCO
Distinguished Service Medal	DSM
Presidential Inauguration Medal	PM
Peace Support Operations Medal	PSM
Land Forces Officer Medal	LFOM
Navy Forces Officer Medal	NFOM
Air Forces Officer Medal	AFOM
