= Order of Lesotho =

- Current ribbon bar of the order

Awarded by Lesotho
- Type: Order of merit
- Established: 1972
- Eligibility: Mosotho citizens and foreign nationals
- Awarded for: For meritorious service by Lesotho citizens and foreign nationals
- Grand Master: King of Lesotho
- Grades: Grand Commander; Commander; Officer
- Previous ribbon bar of the order (1972-1987)

The Most Courteous Order of Lesotho is the highest national order in the honours system of Lesotho. It was founded by King Moshoeshoe II of Lesotho in 1972, in three grades.

== Insignia ==
The original ribbon for the order was predominantly dark blue, with narrow edges of red and green. In 1987, the ribbon was changed to feature a lighter blue, with edges of green and edge stripes of white, mimicking the colors of the nation's flag. The badge of the order is a metal facsimile of the Mosotho coat of arms, with the horses enameled in orange with black manes, and the central shield featuring a green enameled crocodile.

== Notable recipients ==
- Bill Clinton
- Festus Mogae
- Kenneth Kaunda
- Nelson Mandela
