= Orders, decorations, and medals of Latvia =

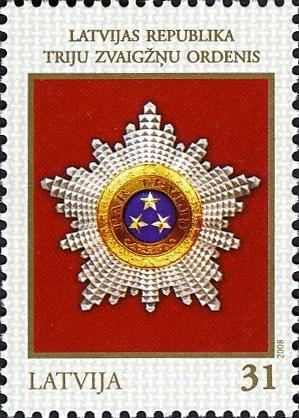
Stamp of Latvia, depicting the Order of the Three Stars

Awards and decorations of Latvia are governed by the Republic of Latvia Law on State Honours of 2004, last amended in 2010.

== State decorations ==
State orders, medals and other decorations are bestowed by the President of Latvia or a person assigned by him on May 4 - Restoration of Independence Day, November 11 - Lāčplēsis Day and November 18 – Proclamation Day of the Republic of Latvia, as well as on other days on special occasions.

The President of Latvia is awarded with the highest order, the Order of the Three Stars, upon starting to hold his office after taking the oath.

=== Orders ===
- The Order of the Three Stars
- The Order of Viesturs
- The Cross of Recognition

=== Insignia of the Orders ===
- the Order with the Golden Chain (only the Order of Three Stars);
- the Cross of the Commander of the Grand Cross (First Class Order);
- the Cross of the Grand Officer (Second Class Order);
- the Cross of the Commander (Third Class Order);
- the Cross of the Officer (Fourth Class Order);
- the Cross of the Knight (Fifth Class Order);
- the Medals of Honour (First Level, Second Level, Third Level).

=== Medals and other decorations ===
- The Order of Lāčplēsis (awarded 1920–1928)
- Commemorative Medal for Participants of the Barricades of 1991 (awarded since 1996, state award since 2010 under the Law on State Honours)
- Latvian War of Independence 10 Year Anniversary Commemorative Medal (awarded in 1928)

== Other decorations ==
- The Award of the Cabinet of Ministers (Ministru kabineta balva)
- Commemorative Medal for Advancing Latvia's Membership to NATO (2004, awarded by the Minister of Defence)
- The Fatherland Award (Tēvzemes balva, awarded 1937–1940, predecessor of the Award of the Cabinet of Ministers)
- Aizsargi Cross of Merit (Aizsargu Nopelnu krusts, awarded 1927–1940)
- Aizsargi Medal "For Effort" ("For Diligence'", Aizsargu medaļa "Par uzcītību", awarded 1927–1940)

== Order of precedence of decorations ==
1. The Order of Three Stars
2. The Order of Viesturs
3. The Cross of Recognition
4. The Medal of Honour of the Order of Three Stars
5. The Medal of Honour of the Order of Viesturs
6. The Medal of Honour of the Cross of Recognition
7. The Commemorative Medal for Participants of the Barricades of 1991
8. Other awards and foreign awards
