= Orders, decorations, and medals of Algeria =

Orders, decorations, and medals of Algeria include:

- National Order of Merit (ordre du mérite national)
- Medal of Martyr of the National Liberation War (médaille du martyr de la guerre de libération nationale)
- Medal of Gravely Wounded, War Disabled (médaille de grand blessé, mutilé de guerre)
- Medal of the National Liberation Army (médaille de l'Armée de Libération Nationale)
- Resistance Medal (médaille de résistant)
- Wounded Medal with Citation (médaille de blessé avec citation)
- Medal of Bravery of the People's National Army (médaille de bravoure de l'Armée Nationale Populaire)
- Wounded Medal without Citation (médaille de blessé sans citation)
- Medal of Military Merit (médaille du mérite militaire)
- Medal of Honor (médaille d'honneur)
- Medal of Participation of the People's National Army in the Wars of the Middle East of 1967 and 1973 (médaille de participation de l'Armée Nationale Populaire aux guerres du Moyen-Orient 1967 et 1973)
- Medal of the People's National Army (médaille de l'Armée Nationale Populaire)
