= Orders, decorations, and medals of Andorra =

Andorran honours system

The Principality of Andorra's honours system started developing very recently and it is still in development.

== History ==
The Principality of Andorra started the development of an honours system in 2007, through the Consolidation Decree 12-09-2007 and the implementation Ministerial Decree 07–12–2007, resulting in the creation of the Order of Charlemagne amongst the Charlemagne Prizes.

In the following years, the Andorran honours system was expanded in 2011 by the Inter-Parish Commission with the creation of the medals and awards for the City Guards of the country, adopted by Decree by all the Parishes.

This system, with many mistakes committed during its application, was reformed by the Andorran phalerist Adrià Espineta Arias through a technical report that was implemented in 2015 and changed the protocol and designs of most of the awards. Consequently, during late 2015 and early 2016, the reviewed and adapted Decrees were approved by all Parishes implementing the reforms and producing the first award ceremony in May 2016.

On the other hand, since 2013 the Andorran Fire Brigade is currently awarding a 25 years of Service Medal which remains unregulated.

On 12 May 2022 the General Council of Andorra approved the Law 12/2022, of 12 May, of Protocol and Ceremonial, which created the Cross of the Seven Arms as the highest decoration of the State and revived the Order of Charlemagne, for which a new regulation was approved by the Council of Ministers on 22 May 2024.

== Order of precedence ==
Orders

- Cross of the Seven Arms
- Order of Charlemagne

Medals and decorations

- City Guards Cross of Professional Merit
- City Guards Medal for 25 years of Service
- City Guards Medal for 20 years of Service
- City Guards Medal for 15 years of Service
- Medal for 25 years of Service in Canillo
- Medal for 25 years of Service in Encamp
- Medal for 25 years of Service in Ordino
- Medal for 25 years of Service in La Massana
- Medal for 25 years of Service in Andorra la Vella
- Medal for 25 years of Service in Sant Julià de Lòria
- Medal for 25 years of Service in Escaldes-Engordany
- Medal for 25 years of Service at the Fire Brigade of the Principality of Andorra
- Commemorative Medal for the Accession of the Episcopal Coprince - 26 June 2025
