= Orders, decorations, and medals of Kiribati =

The honours system of Kiribati was established by the Kiribati National Honours and Awards Act 1989. This act created a system of awards to recognize exemplary, meritorious or distinguished service, "in, for, or to Kiribati". The awards are divided into two categories, civil and disciplined forces. Awards are conferred by the Beretitenti, upon the advice of the Cabinet. The awards are as follows in their order of precedence:

Civil category;

- Kiribati Grand Order (K.G.O.) (Gilbertese: Ana Tokabeti Kiribati (A.T.K))
- Kiribati National Order (K.N.O) (Ana Kamoamoa Kiribati (A.K.K))
- Kiribati Cross (K.C) (Ana Kaibangaki N Ninikoria Kiribati (A.K.N.K))
- Kiribati Order of Merit (K.O.M) (Boutokan Toronibwain Kiribati (B.T.K))

Disciplined forces category;

- Meritorious Service Award (M.S.A) (Raoiroin Rakan Te Mwakuri (R.R.M))
- Kiribati Long Service and Good Conduct Award (K.L.S.G.C.A) (Kanikinaean Te Bekumwaka Ma te Kakaonimaki (K.B.K))
