= Orders, decorations, and medals of Argentina =

Orders, decorations, and medals of Argentina include:

Decorations and medals

- Order of the Liberator General San Martín (Orden "del Libertador General San Martín")
- Cross to the Heroic Valour in Combat (Cruz "La Nación Argentina al Heróico Valor en Combate")
- Medal of Valour in Combat (Medalla "La Nación Argentina al Valor en Combate")
- Medal for the Malvinas Campaign 1982 (Medalla "El Honorable Congreso a los Combatientes en Malvinas")
- Killed in Combat Medal (Medalla "La Nación Argentina al Muerto en Combate")
- Wounded in Combat Medal (Medalla "La Nación Argentina al Herido en Combate")
- Army Military Merit Medal (Medalla "El Ejército Argentino al Merito Militar")
- Army Effort and Abnegation Medal (Medalla "El Ejército Argentino al Esfuerzo y Abnegación")
- Army Wounded in Combat Medal (Medalla "El Ejército Argentino al Herido en Combate")
- Malvinas Campaign Medal of Gratitude
