= Orders, decorations, and medals of Mozambique =

The present honours and decorations were passed by the Mozambican Assembly of the Republic in March 2011. It consists of two honorary titles, five Orders and some medals. The awards are managed by the National Commission on Honours and Decorations. The President of Mozambique will present the awards after recommendation by the Assembly, the provincial and central governments, the armed forces and the educational establishment.

== Honorary titles ==
- Hero of the Republic of Mozambique: awarded to Mozambican citizens for acts of bravery.
- Honorary Citizen of the Republic of Mozambique: awarded to foreigners in recognition of their assistance during the Mozambican War of Independence and for assisting in the country's development.

== Orders ==
- Eduardo Mondlane Order: the country's highest order named after Eduardo Mondlane, the founder of FRELIMO who was killed in 1969 by a bomb blast at FRELIMO headquarters in Dar es Salaam, Tanzania.
- Samora Machel Order: named after Samora Machel, Mozambique's first president.
- 25 June Order: named after the date Mozambique attained its independence from Portugal. Both Mozambicans and foreigners are eligible for this award that recognises their contribution towards national independence.
- 25 September Military Order: named after the commencement date of the armed struggle against Portuguese colonial rule. It is awarded for extraordinary merit demonstrated during the independence struggle, in defending the country's sovereignty and for peacekeeping missions.
- 4 October Order: named after the date the Rome General Peace Accords was signed between FRELIMO and RENAMO; thus signifying the end of the Mozambican Civil War. The order recognises extraordinary acts for the preservation of peace.

== Medals ==
- Medal for Veterans of the Liberation Struggle
- Nachingwea Medal: named after FRELIMO's base in the southern Tanzanian district of Nachingwea during the war of independence.
- Bagamoyo Medal: named after the Tanzanian coastal town of Bagamoyo which hosted the Frelimo Secondary School and a vocational training centre used by FRELIMO freedom fighters.
