= Orders, decorations, and medals of Rwanda =

The Republic of Rwanda's honours system consists of orders and medals awarded for exemplary service to the nation.

Orders and Medals	Acronym
RDF Order of Honour	OH
National Liberation Medal	LM
Campaign Against Genocide Medal (Umurinzi Medal)	CGM
Order of Bravery Medal	OB
Exemplary Performance Medal	EPM
Defence Superior Service Medal	DSSM
Joint Command Superior Medal	JCM
Land Forces Superior Service Medal	SSM
Air Force Superior Service Medal	SSM
Foreign Campaign Medal	FCM
Long Service and Good Conduct Order	LSO
Distinguished Conduct Order	DCO
Distinguished Service Medal	DSM
Presidential Inauguration Medal	PIM
Peace Support Operations Medal	PSM

== Obsolete awards ==
- National Order of the Thousand Hills
