= Military awards and decorations =

Award, usually a medal of some sort, mark of honor

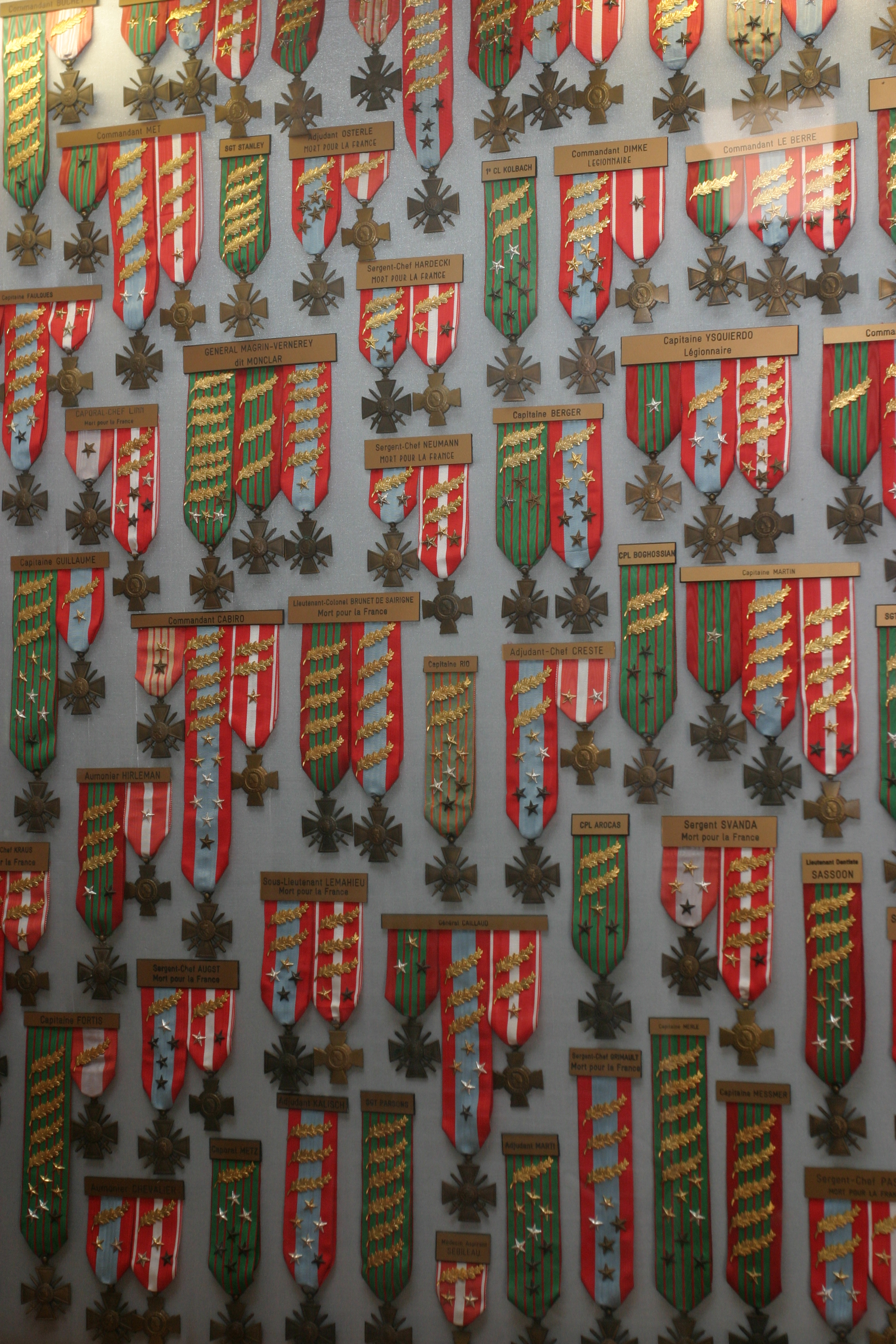
Wall of Medals in the French Foreign Legion Museum

Military awards and decorations are distinctions given as a mark of honor for military heroism, meritorious or outstanding service or achievement. A decoration is often a medal consisting of a ribbon and a medallion.

Civil decorations awarded to military personnel should not be considered military decorations, although some orders of chivalry have civil and military divisions. Decorations received by police and fire brigade personnel may sometimes be considered alongside military decorations, on which they may be modelled, although they are strictly not military awards.

Military awards and decorations may take the form of medal ribbons or miniature medals, which are mounted together on a bar known as a barrette.

== History ==
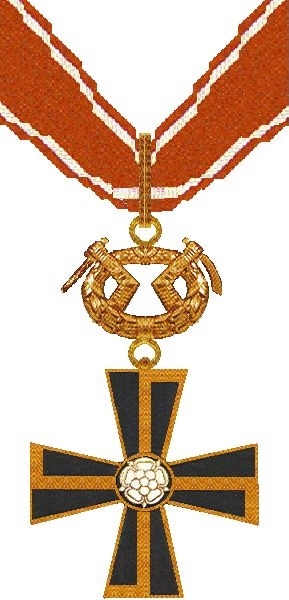
The I class of the Mannerheim Cross of the Order of the Cross of Liberty from 1941

Decorations have been known since ancient times. The Egyptian Old Kingdom had the Order of the Golden Collar while the New Kingdom awarded the Order of the Golden Fly. Celts and Romans wore a torc or received other military decorations such as the hasta pura, a spear without a tip. Dayaks wore and still wear tattoos, etc. Necklaces and bracelets were given during the early Middle Ages, evolving into large, richly jewelled necklaces, often with a pendant (commonly a medal) attached.

The oldest military decorations still in use is Sweden's För tapperhet i fält ('For Valour in the Field') and För tapperhet till sjöss ('For Valour at Sea') awarded to officers and soldiers of the Swedish Armed Forces who have—as the medal names suggest—shown valour in the field or at sea in wartime. The medal was instituted by Swedish king Gustav III on 28 May 1789, during his war against Russia. Whilst technically it is still active, it is for practical purposes inactive, not having been awarded since 1915. The next oldest is the Austro-Hungarian Tapferkeits Medaille Honour Medal for Bravery 1789–1792. This medal was instituted on 19 July 1789, by the Emperor Joseph II.

Another of the oldest military decorations still in use is Poland's War Order of Virtuti Militari (Latin for 'For Military Valour'). It was first awarded in 1792.

== Forgery ==
Medals have been forged by many people to make the medal appear more valuable or to make one look like a more decorated soldier. Medal forgeries can include: adding bars, engraving a famous soldier's name on it or creating a whole new medal. Medal forgery is illegal in most countries and can be punishable by imprisonment.

== Contemporary use ==
Today military decorations include:

- Orders of merit;
- Bravery awards, in the form of a cross, star or medal on a ribbon;
- Distinguished service awards, in the form of a cross, star or medal on a ribbon;
- Campaign medals worn on a ribbon;
- Service medals worn on a ribbon;
- Awards for entire units, in the form of battle honours, campaign streamers, fourragères, or unit citations.

In most NATO militaries, only the service ribbons are normally worn on everyday occasions (as opposed to the actual medals).

=== Examples ===
List of highest military decorations by country

- Commonwealth Realms orders and decorations
- Orders, decorations, and medals of Belgium
- Awards and decorations of the German Armed Forces
- Awards and decorations of the Indian Armed Forces
- Israeli military decorations
- Awards and decorations of the Russian Federation
- Awards and decorations of the Soviet Union
- Orders, decorations, and medals of Spain
- Orders, decorations, and medals of the United Kingdom
- Awards and decorations of the United States military
