= Orders, decorations, and medals of Jordan =

Jordanian honours and medals

In the Hashemite Kingdom of Jordan personal bravery, achievement, or service are rewarded with honours by the King of Jordan.

The honours system consists of two types of award:

- Orders are used to recognise merit in terms of achievement and service – of either a civil or military nature;
- Medals are used to mark commemorative events, service on a particular operation or in a specific theatre, long or valuable service, and good conduct.

Appointments to the various orders and awards of other honours are usually published in the Kingdom's Official Gazette.

== Brief history ==
The modern country of Jordan has its origin in the Arab Revolt and its campaign against the Ottoman Empire led by the Hashemite ruler of Mecca Sharif Hussein Bin Ali. Following the success of the Revolt, Sharif Hussein established several awards to mark his victory. Several Hashemite states came into existence after the Revolt, and Jordan as the only remaining one today continues to award those orders created by Sharif Hussein.

== Modern honours ==
As the head of state, the Sovereign is the fount of honour, but over time their responsibility has been passed over to the government of the day. Most honours in Jordan are now directly nominated and vetted by ministries or military branches and only approved by the King at a final stage by royal decree. Although some awards are still given at the direct initiative of the King. Various orders have been created (see below) as well as awards for military service, bravery, merit, and achievement which take the form of medals or badges. Most medals are not graded. Each one recognises specific service so there are normally set criteria which must be met. These criteria may include a period of time and will often delimit a particular geographic region or to mark a specific anniversary or event.

=== Independence Day and Army Day Honours ===
Honours in Jordan are usually published and awarded on important anniversaries, namely Independence Day on May 25 and Army Day on June 10. Investitures are usually presided over by the King and attended by members of the Royal Family and televised to the country.

== Current Orders ==
The current system in Jordan is made up of 10 civil orders and four military orders. They are ordered in seniority per Jordanian law.

=== Civil Orders ===
Complete name	Ranks (letters)	Ribbon	Established	Founder	Awarded to/for/by	Associated awards	Refs
Order of Hussein bin Ali	Collar		16 July 1949	King Abdullah I	For foreign allied heads of state and senior members of royal families.	Sash of Hussein Bin Ali (Awarded 1967-1977)	
Supreme Order of the Renaissance	Grand Cordon with Brilliants, Grand Cordon, Grand Officer, Commander, Officer, Member		October 1918	Sharif Hussein Bin Ali	Members of the Royal Family, senior officials and others with exceptional and long service to the kingdom.	None	
Order of the Star of Jordan	Grand Cordon, Grand Officer, Commander, Officer, Member		December 1947	King Abdullah I	Members of the royal family, senior military officers and government officials.	None	
Order of Independence	Grand Cordon, Grand Officer, Commander, Officer, Member		October 1918	Sharif Hussein Bin Ali	Members of the royal family and senior diplomats.	Medal of Independence (Awarded 1918-2015)	
Order of the Hashemite Star	First Class		1972	King Hussein	Historically for military bravery, presently for senior members of the royal family and civilian dedicated service.	None	
Al-Hussein Order for Distinguished Contributions	Grand Cordon, Companion		29 March 1977	King Hussein	Services to cultural and social wellbeing by Jordanians and foreign citizens.	Al-Hussein Medal for Excellence	
King Abdullah II ibn Al Hussein Order for Distinction	Grand Cordon, Grand Officer, Commander, Officer, Member		2015	King Abdullah II	Jordanians and foreign nationals who have shown commitment and investment in Jordan's success or for personal achievement.	Abdullah bin Al-Hussein Medal for Excellence	
Order of the State Centenary	Grand Cordon, Member		April 2021	King Abdullah II	For committed service to Jordan in its first 100 years	None	
Order of Valour and Salvation	Grand Cordon with Brilliants, Grand Cordon, Grand Officer, Commander, Officer, Member		2015	King Abdullah II	For bravery and gallantry by civilians and members of the Public Security Directorate	None	
Order of Honour	First Class		1956 (as a military award); 2015 (as a civil award)	King Hussein	From 1956 to 2015 for outstanding military service, from 2015 for charitable or cultural work.	None	

=== Military Orders ===
Complete name	Ranks (letters)	Ribbon	Established	Founder	Awarded to/for/by	Associated awards	Refs
Order of Dedication and Sacrifice	Grand Cordon with Brilliants, Grand Cordon, Grand Officer, Commander, Officer, Member		2015	King Abdullah II	For bravery and gallantry by members of the Jordanian Armed Forces	Order of Military Gallantry (until 2015)	
Order of Military Merit	Grand Cordon, Grand Officer, Commander, Officer, Member		1972	King Hussein	Members of the Jordanian Armed Forces and allied militaries.	None	
Order of Participation in Peacekeeping Forces	First Class		1993	King Hussein	Members of the Jordanian Armed Forces and Public Security Directorate who participate in international peacekeeping operations.	None	
Order of Military Gallantry	First Class		1946	King Abdullah I	Members of the Jordanian Armed Forces who exhibit extraordinary bravery or gallantry	Order of Dedication and Sacrifice (replaced this in 2015)	

== See also ==
- Hashemites
- Great Arab Revolt
