= Orders, decorations, and medals of Monaco =

There are four orders of Monaco. These are:

- Order of Saint-Charles (French: Ordre de Saint-Charles), founded on 15 March 1858 by Prince Charles III and modified on 23 December 1966 by Prince Rainier III;
- Order of the Crown (Ordre de la Couronne), founded on 20 July 1960 and modified on 23 December 1966 by Prince Rainier III;
- Order of Grimaldi (Ordre des Grimaldi), founded on 18 November 1954 and modified on 19 July 1960, as well 23 December 1966 by Prince Rainier III;
- Order of Cultural Merit (Ordre du Mérite culturel), founded on 31 December 1952 by Prince Rainier III.

Monaco has a number of other decorations, including:

- Medal of Honour (Monaco) created on 5 February 1894 by Prince Albert I, modified on 20 April 1925 by Prince Louis II, again modified on 13 November 1952 by Prince Rainier III;
- Monaco Red Cross Medal, created on 16 October 1950 by Prince Rainier III;
- Citation For Exceptional Service, created on 7 April 1951 and modified on 23 December 1966 by Prince Rainier III;
- Monaco Blood Donor Medal, created on 30 July 1993 by Prince Rainier III.

These are awarded by the Prince of Monaco, currently Albert II, Prince of Monaco.
