= Orders, decorations, and medals of Lebanon =

The coat of arms of Lebanon.

This is a list of some of the modern orders, decorations and medals of Lebanon.

== National orders ==
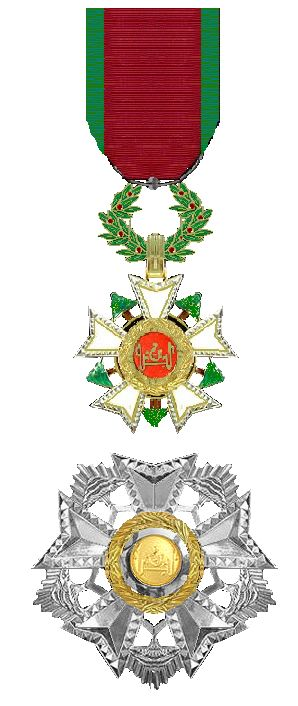
Order of the Cedar

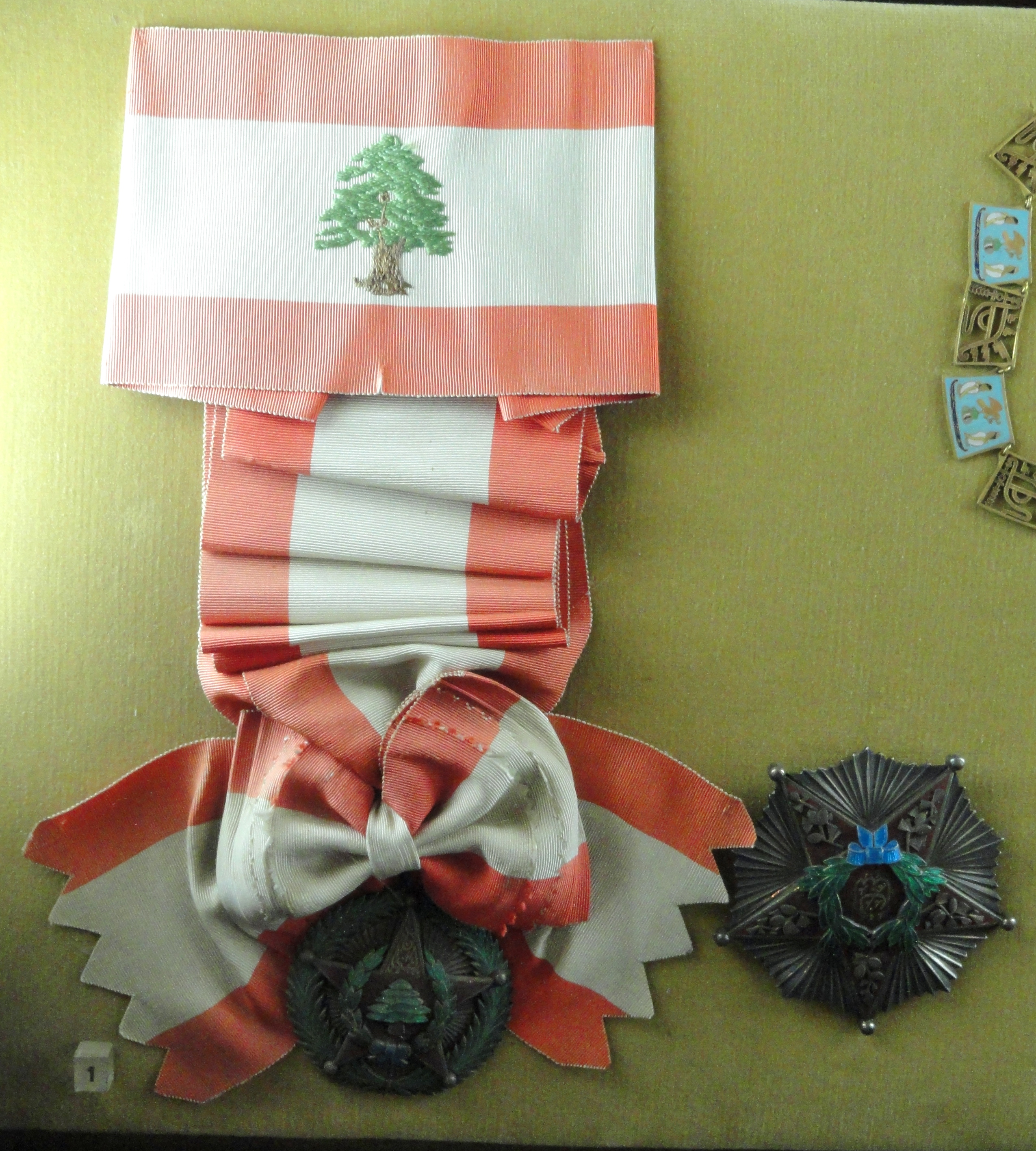
Order of Merit

== Military and Security decorations ==
=== Lebanese Army ===
- Navy Medal
- Medal of the Eagle (Air Force)
- Military Medal
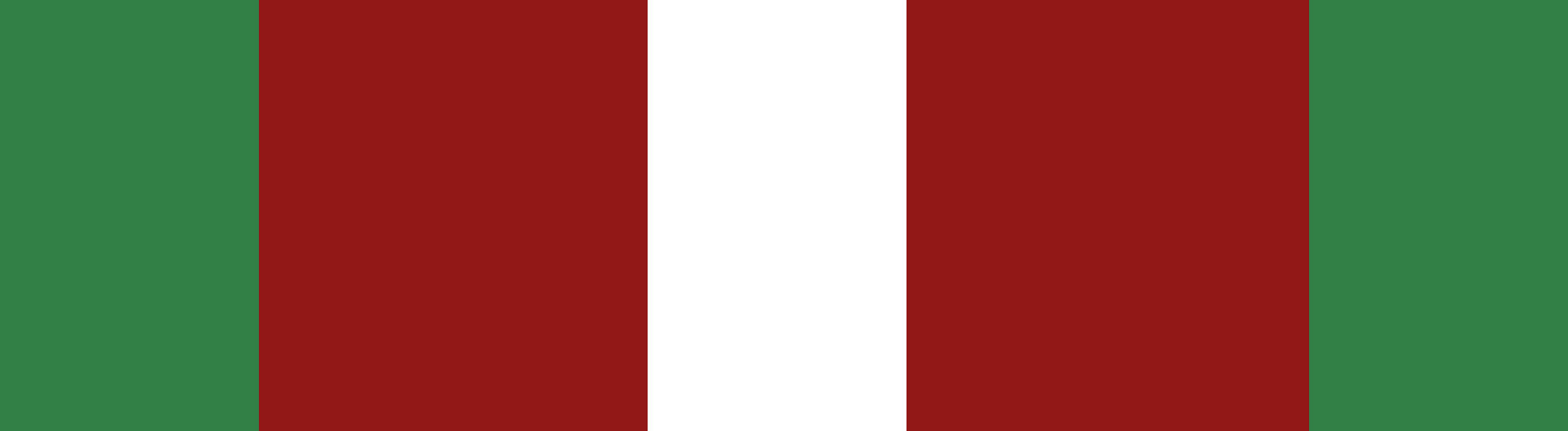
- War Medal
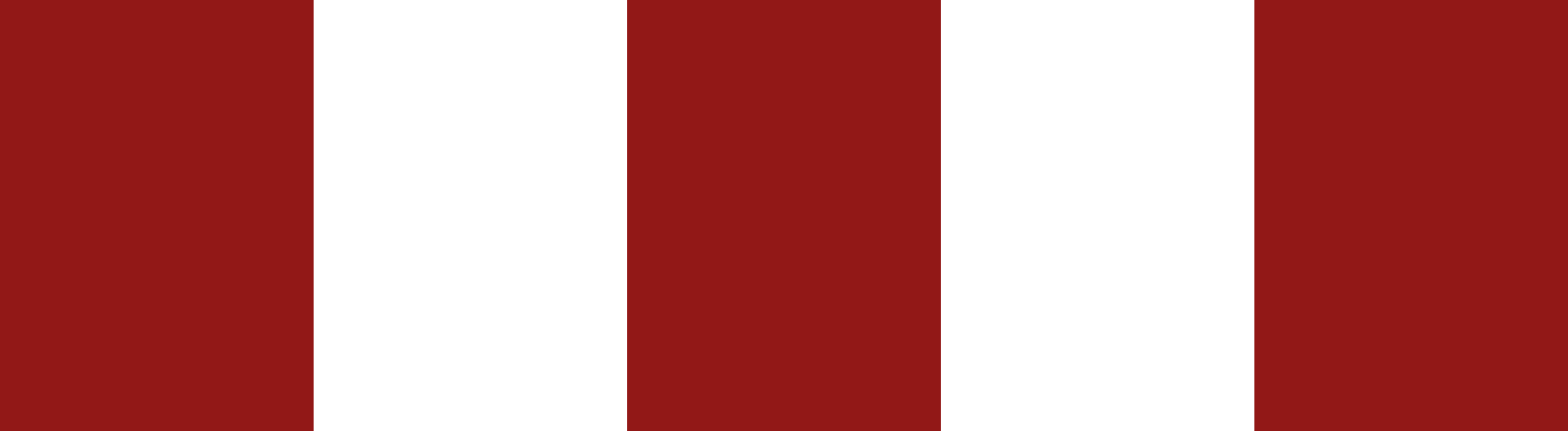
- Medal for Battle Wounds
- Medal of War Prisoner
- Military Valour Medal
- Military Medal of Honour
- Lebanon Army Pride Medal
- Medal In The Fight Against Terrorism

==== Commemorative decorations ====
- 2002 conferences memorial medal
- Medal of National Unity
- The Medal of Palestine
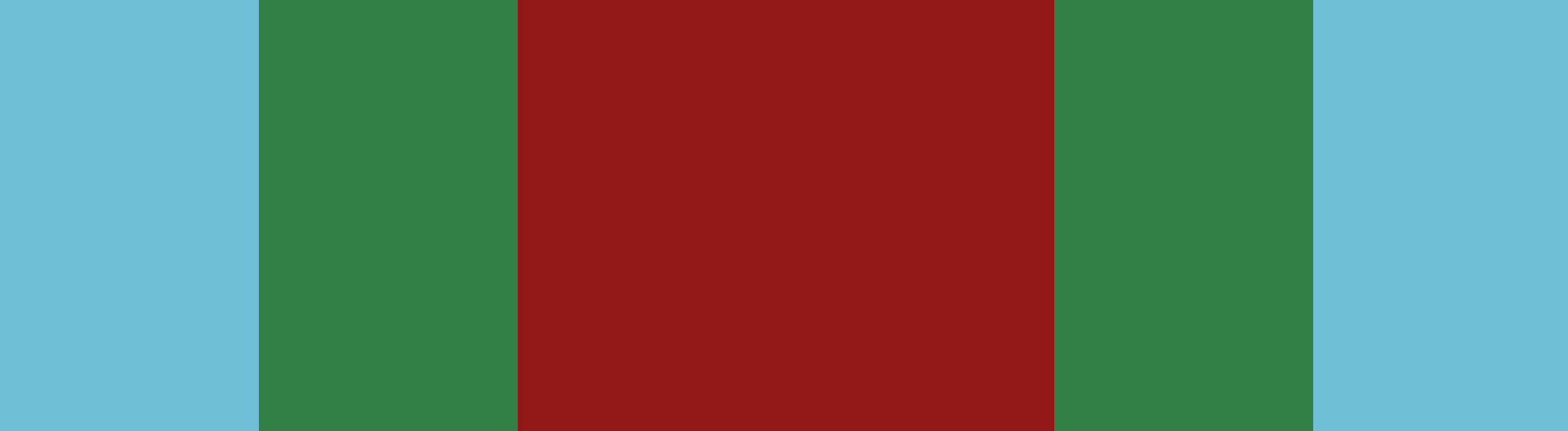
- The Medal of 31 December 1961
- Medal of the "Dawn of the South"
- 1926 Commemorative Medal For Lebanon

=== Security Forces decorations ===
- State Security Medal
- Medal of General Security
- Medal of Competence
- Internal Security Forces Medal

=== UNIFL decorations ===
- UNIFL Medal
- Peace Medal

== Civilian decorations ==
- Medal Of The Emigrant
- Medal of the Teacher
- Medal of Agricultural Merit
- Medal of Public Health Merit
- Labor Medal
- Order of Public Instruction
