= Order of the Somali Star =

Military award

- Order of the Leopard variant
- Type: Medal for highest degree of distinction
- Awarded for: Acts of military gallantry Dedication and fidelity to the Somali Republic
- Country: Somalia
- Presented by: President of Somalia; Government of Somalia
- Eligibility: Somali and foreign citizens
- Ribbon
- Status: Active
- Established: 12 February 1961
- First award: 1965 – Major General Daud Abdulle Hirsi (posthumously)

Precedence
- Next (higher): None

The Order of the Somali Star is the highest distinction award for military gallantry in Somalia. The Order of the Somali Star has been awarded to members of the Somali Armed Forces and foreign citizens who have conducted and exhibited great fidelity to the Somali Republic. It has been issued mainly during the Ogaden War to military and police officers posthumously.

== History ==
The Order of the Somali Star was established by the Government of Somalia in 1961, the year after Somalia became a republic. It was named in honor of the Somali flag, which features a sky-blue field with a white central star. The award was created by the first president of Somalia, Aden Adde. The award can be worn as a necklet, medal, or sash.

== Statute ==
The title of Order of the Somali Star can be awarded for military gallantry in the service of Somalia. It can be awarded to both civilian and military personnel. The title can also be awarded posthumously if the heroic act costs the recipient his or her life. It may also be awarded to foreign citizens who display exceptional service to the Somali republic, The president of Somalia is the main conferring authority of the award although the Federal Parliament may nominate individuals for the president's consideration.

== Description ==
The award comes in grades with the Order of the Leopard (formerly the Knight of the Grand Cross changed due to the adoption of Islam as the state religion) which gold-plated badge to be worn on the band and gold-plated plate to be worn on the left chest; Grand Officer, silver badge to be worn on a ribbon around the neck and plaque to be worn on the left chest; Commander, silver badge to be worn on a ribbon around the neck; Officer, silver badge to be worn on a ribbon with a rosette on the chest; Knight, silver badge to be worn on a ribbon on the chest.

== Recipients ==
The vast majority of recipients of this award are Somali military officers and enlisted soldiers who died in service to Somalia; however, there are foreign dignitaries who received this award due to their exceptional service to the Somali state.

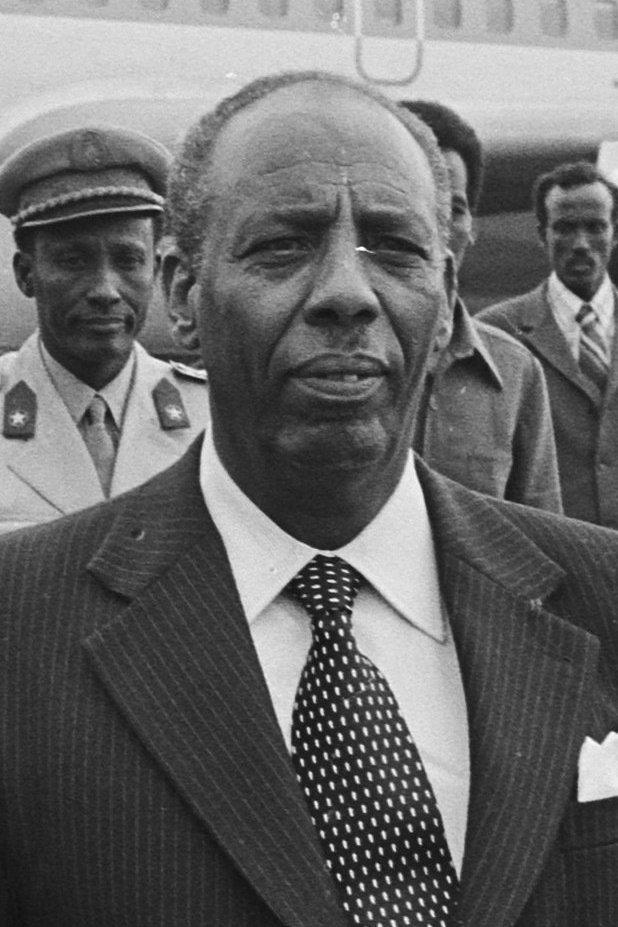
Mohamed Siad Barre who was issued the Order in 1979 by the Supreme Revolutionary Council by the Politburo following the 10 year anniversary of the XHKS Revolution.

=== Individuals ===
==== Military personnel ====
- Major General Daud Abdulle Hirsi (Army)
- Major Elmi Nuur Tarey (Tarambi) (army)
- Major General Mohamed Siad Barre (Army)
- Major General Dahir Adan Elmi (Army)
- Lieutenant General Mohamed Ali Samatar (Army)
- Brigadier General Ali Matan Hashi (Air Force)
- Vice Admiral Mohamed Osman (Navy)
- Colonel Abukar Liban (Army)

==== Foreign dignitaries ====
- (Cuba) Fidel Castro – Awarded in 1977, for "extraordinary services to Somalia."
- Faisal I – Awarded in light of diplomatic relations between Somalia and Saudi Arabia.
- (Egypt) Anwar Sadat – Provided support during the Ogaden War.
- (Egypt) Field Marshal Abdel Ghani el-Gamasy – Recognized for diplomatic relations with Somalia.
- (Egypt) Mohammed Hassan El-Zayyat – Awarded for diplomatic efforts related to Somali independence.
- (Libya) Muammar Gaddafi – Recognized due to diplomatic relations.
- (Pahlavi Iran) Mohammad Reza I – Awarded based on shared diplomatic interests.
- (Soviet Union) Lieutenant general Vasily Vasilyevich Shakhnovich – Served as Soviet military advisor to Somali Armed Forces.
- (Soviet Union) Colonel general Grigory Grigorievich Borisov – Served as Soviet military advisor to Somali Armed Forces.
- (Ethiopian Empire) Haile Selassie I – Awarded in 1960 by President Aden Adde.
- (Sudan) Jaafar Nimeiry – Recognized due to diplomatic relations.
- (Turkey) Recep Tayyip Erdoğan – Awarded in 2015 for contributions to Somalia.
- (Socialist Federal Republic of Yugoslavia) Josip Broz Tito – Awarded in 1976 based on diplomatic relations.

== See also ==
- Order of the Nile
- Hero of the Soviet Union
- Nishan-e-Haider
- Gold Medal of Military Valour
