= Orders, decorations, and medals of Senegal =

The Republic of Senegal awards the following orders, decorations and medals.

== National Order of the Lion ==
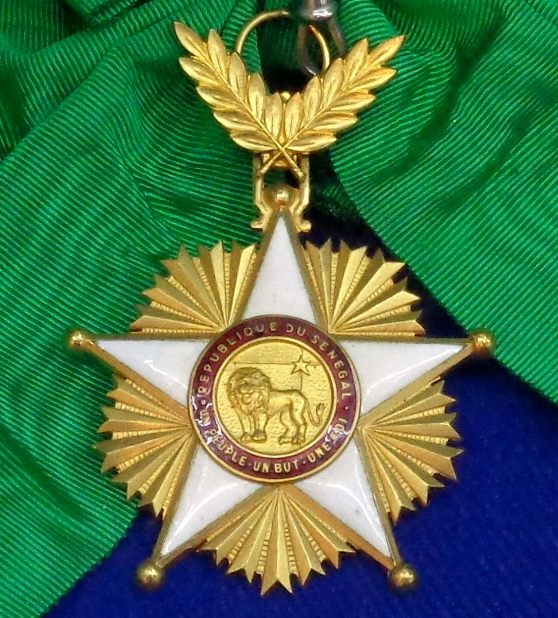
Badge of the Grand Cross

The National Order of the Lion (French: Ordre national du Lion du Sénégal) was founded on 22 October 1960. It has a green ribbon.

It has the following ranks:

- Grand Cross (grand-croix)
- Grand Officer (grand officier)
- Commander (commandeur)
- Officer (officier)
- Knight (chevalier)

== National Order of Merit ==
The Order of Merit was founded on 22 October 1960. Its ribbon is green with a narrow yellow central stripe.

It has the following ranks:

- Grand Cross
- Grand Officer
- Commander
- Officer
- Knight

Recipients include: Knight Grand Cross :

- Manuel Valls

Knight

- Aminata Sow Fall, writer, 2006

Officer

- Mohamed Mjid, President of the Royal Moroccan Federation of Tennis, 2009
- Jocelyne Béroard, 1996
- Jacob Desvarieux, 1996

== Order of August 20 ==
The Order of August 20 was founded on 2 October 1960. Its ribbon is red with a central black stripe.

== Order of Academic Palms ==
The Order of Academic Palms was founded on 23 December 1974. Its ribbon is purple with a yellow central stripe.

It has the following ranks:

- Commander
- Officer
- Knight

== Order of Agricultural Merit ==
The Order of Agricultural Merit was founded on 7 August 1982. Its ribbon is blue with a maroon central stripe and green edges.

It has the following ranks:

- Commander
- Officer
- Knight

== Military medals ==
- Cross of Military Valor

Instituted: 1 February 1968. Awarded: for acts of valour in peace or war.

Ribbon: maroon with a yellow-edged black central stripe.

- Military Medal

Instituted: 28 April 1964. Awarded: for acts of valour or to NCOs for long and meritorious service.

Ribbon: green with a yellow central stripe and narrow yellow edges.

- Wound Medal

Awarded: for sustaining wounds in combat.

Ribbon: green with a narrow red central stripe.

== Medals of Honour ==
- Medal of Honour of the Army

Instituted: 12 March 2007.

Ribbon: red with blue edges.

- Medal of Honour of the Gendarmerie

Instituted: 1978.

Ribbon: blue with a green, yellow and red central stripe.

- Medal of Honour of the Police

Instituted: 29 May 1972.

Ribbon: yellow with a green central stripe and red edges.

- Medal of Honour of the Customs Service

Instituted: 13 January 1966.

Ribbon: yellow with a red central stripe and green edges.

- Medal of Honour of Firefighters

Instituted: 31 December 1980.

- Medal of Honour of Primary Teachers

== Women's Medal ==
Recipients include:

- Cheikh Tidiane Tall, artist and musician.

== Other medals ==
- Medal of Labour (Instituted: 25 February 1966. Awarded: for long service in a maximum of 3 different jobs. Ranks: Great Gold Medal for 30 Years; Gold Medal for 25 Years; Silver-Gilt Medal for 20 Years; Silver Medal for 15 Years. Ribbon: wide horizontal stripes of green, yellow and red.)
- Medal for Good Truck Drivers
