= Orders, decorations, and medals of Botswana =

The Republic of Botswana has an honours system comprising orders, decorations, and medals. They are awarded to civilians, members of the defence force, the police, the prisons service, and teachers.

== Orders ==
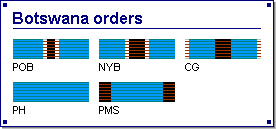

Botswana has the following orders:

- Presidential Order of Botswana (POB)
- Naledi ya Botswana (NYB) — for conspicuous service.
- Cross of Gallantry (CG) — for gallantry.
- Presidential Order of Honour (PH)
- Presidential Order of Meritorious Service (PMS) — for meritorious service.

== Botswana Defence Force ==
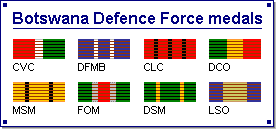

The Botswana Defence Force has the following decorations and medals:

- Conduct Valour Cross (CVC) (1979- ) — for conspicuous valour in action against an enemy.
- Defence Force Medal for Bravery (DFMB) (1979- ) — for conspicuous heroism and courage (not in action against an enemy).
- Conduct Leadership Cross (CLC) (1979- ) — for good, practical, operational leadership in the face of an enemy.
- Duty Code Order (DCO) (1979- ) — for devotion to duty by administrative or technical staff.
- Military Service Medal (MSM) (1979- ) — for sound operational conduct in the face of an enemy.
- Founder Officer Medal (FOM) (1979- ) — for the original officers who were on the strength of the BDF when it was formed.
- Distinguished Service Medal (DSM) (1979- ) — for 20 years service (officers).
- Long Service Order (LSO) (1979- ) — for 15 years service (other ranks).

== Botswana Police ==
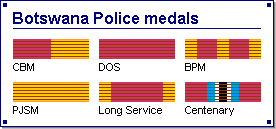

The Botswana Police has the following decorations and medals:

- BP Medal for Conspicuous Bravery (CBM) — for conspicuous bravery.
- BP Distinguished Service Order (DOS) — for devotion to duty.
- BP Medal for Meritorious Service (BPM) — for especially meritorious service.
- BP Jubilee Service Medal (PJSM) — for 25 years service.
- BP Long Service & Good Conduct Medal — for long service.
- BP Centenary Medal — issued to senior officers to mark the centenary of the Botswana Police in 1985.

== Botswana Prisons Service ==
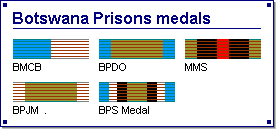

The Botswana Prisons Service has the following decorations and medals:

- BPS Medal for Conspicuous Bravery (BMCB) — for conspicuous bravery.
- BPS Distinguished Service Order (BPDO) — for 30 years service.
- BPS Medal for Meritorious Service (MMS) — for especially meritorious service.
- BPS Jubilee Service Medal (BPJM) — for 25 years service.
- BPS Medal — for long service.

== Teachers ==
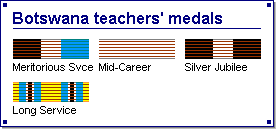

Botswana awards the following decorations and medals to teachers:

- Botswana Teachers Meritorious Service Award
- Botswana Teachers Mid-Career Award
- Botswana Teachers Silver Jubilee Medal
- Botswana Teachers Long and Distinguished Service Award
