= Ammar Khammash =

Jordanian architect and artist (born 1960)

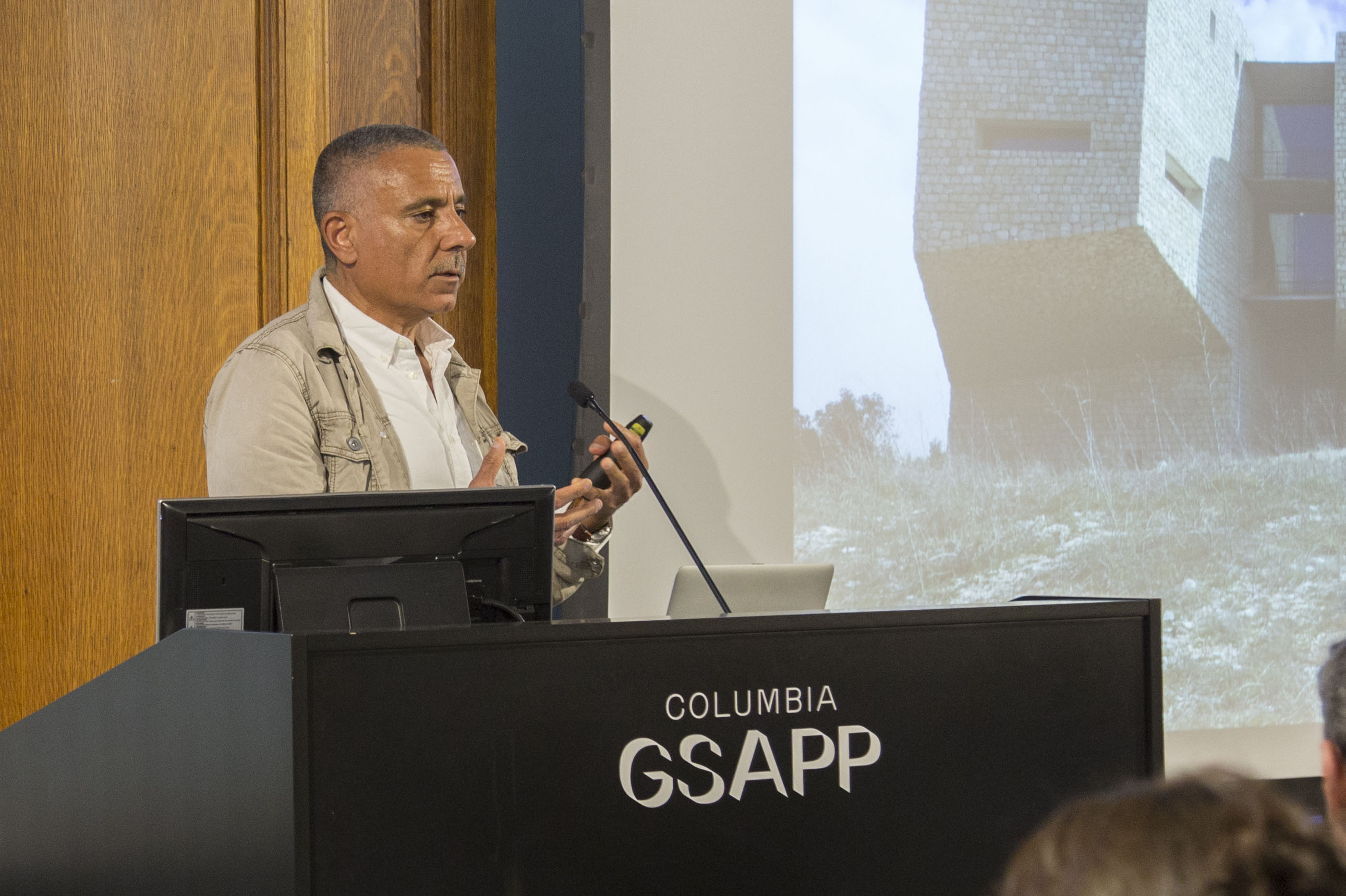
- Born: October 8, 1960 (age 66)
- Occupations: Architect, designer and artist
- Buildings: The main building of Darat Al Funun; Jordan Environment Center; Jordan River Foundation
- Design: Design of the 4th edition of the jordanian paper currency
- Website: www.khammash.com

Ammar Khammash (Arabic: عمار خماش; born 8 October 1960) is a Jordanian architect, designer and artist with Palestinian background. His work is based on the integration of building designs with nature and the surrounding environment. His projects helped revive Pella and Jordan Valley by creating two rest stops.

He has participated in many art exhibits and was tasked to design some of the most prominent buildings in the region. He was given an award for his design of the Nazareth mosque, which was controversial because of its proximity to the Church of the Annunciation. One of his most famous projects is the reconstruction of Pella and the Jordan Valley; he built a rest stop near the museum, one in Pella and the other in Um Qais.

== Work ==
After studying architecture and ethnoarchaeology at the University of Southwestern Louisiana in the United States of America, Ammar Khammash started his career with restoration projects in Jordan. Many of his early projects already showed Khammashs focus on local building traditions and craftsmanship, ecological and social sustainability, innovative design and use of recycled materials. With the restoration of Dana village and the new guesthouse for the Dana nature reserve he revived an abandoned village and, together with the Royal Society for the Conservation of Nature created one of Jordan's first eco tourism sites. Since then many other projects with the RSCN followed, including the Wadi Feynan ecolodge and their landmark 'Wild Jordan' Visitor Center glued to a hillside in central Amman.

Besides architecture Khammash is active in painting, archeology, designing jewelry and photographing the natural and cultural heritage of his native Jordan. In his work he strives to preserve Jordans desert environment and revive the traditional Jordanian building techniques, mixing them with modern materials and design. He was asked to restore and rebuild Hisham's Palestinian Palace, near Jericho which he designed with light paper walls.

Khammash is also a writer, and has become an influential force in demanding that Jordan be both a cultural home for native Jordanians, but also a place that attracts tourists and travelers.

In 2002 and 2023 Ammar Khammash contributed the main design work for the 4th and 5th issue of the Jordanian Dinar paper currency.

== Interest in nature ==
Besides his work as an architect and painter, Ammar Khammash has a strong interest in the natural history of Jordan and its desert landscapes, geology, flora and paleological past. His work often centres around nature or integrates natural materials, especially different stone types. In 2016 Khammash created a 'Desert Sound Instrument' as an art project from hand-picked flint stones that where arranged in order of their tone when tapped.

== Important projects ==
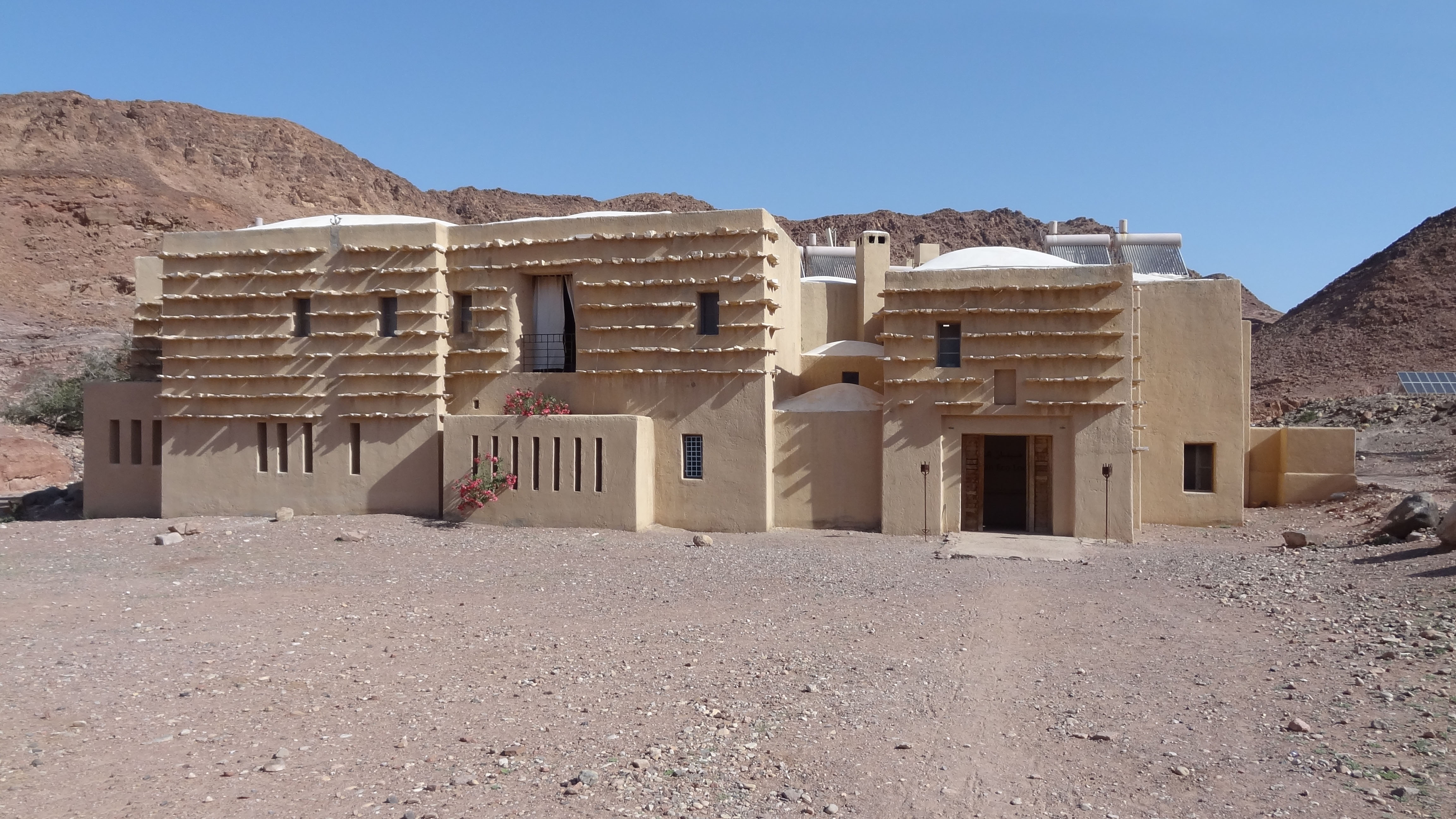
Feynan Eco Lodge with slats to keep the walls in shade

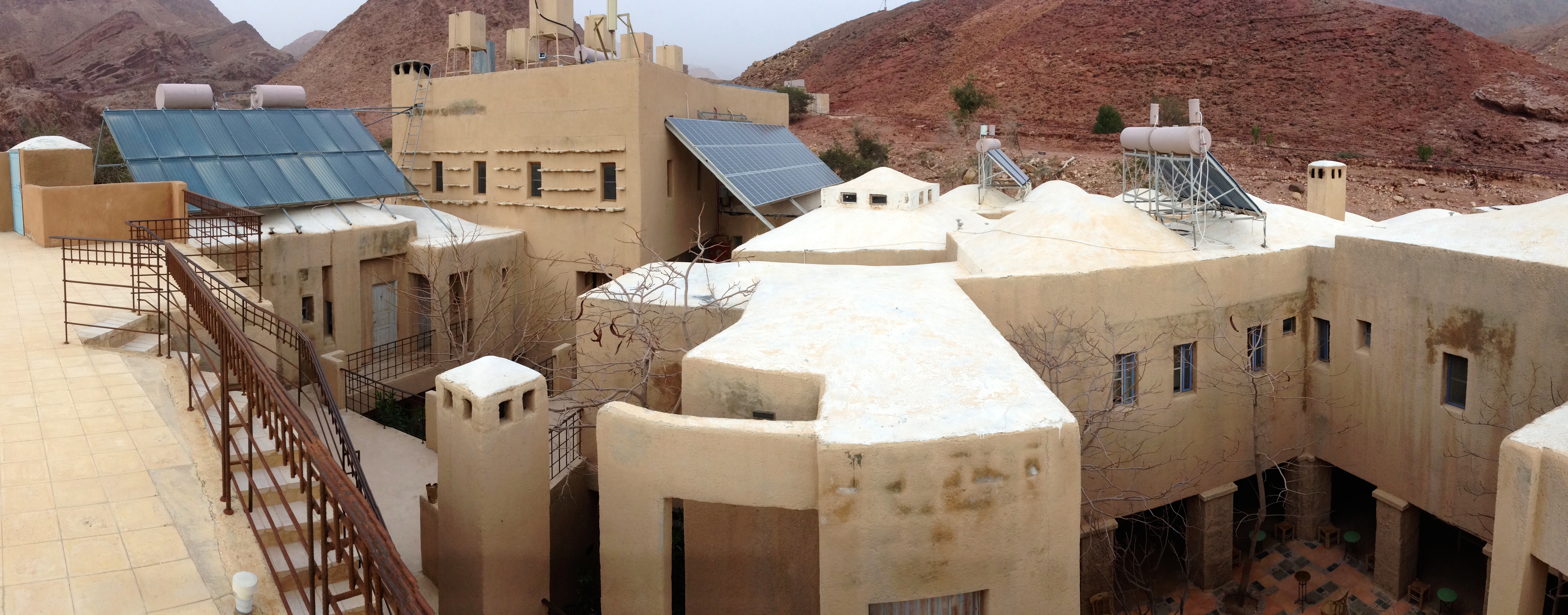
Feynan Ecolodge, courtyard with solar hot water generation

- Dana Biosphere Reserve Visitor Center and Guesthouse, Dana Village and Valley
- Darat al-Funun Art Center, Amman
- Wild Jordan, Main Information Center for Jordans Royal Society for the Conservation of Nature (RSCN)
- The Jordanian Royal Film Commission building, Amman
- Movenpick Dead Sea Spa and Resort, Jordan
- Bedouin Cultural Center, Southern Jordanian desert
- Jordan River Foundation, Amman
- The White Mosque – Nazareth
- RSCN Royal Academy for Nature Conservation, Ajloun, Jordan
- Graphic design for the 4th edition of the Jordanian paper currency
- Visitor Center at Umm el-Jimal archaeological site in northern Jordan

== Awards and honours ==
- First Arab architect to win global sustainability award.
- AGA Khan Award For Architecture Shortlist.
- Global Award for Sustainable Architecture in 2019.
- Guardian-Observer "Ethical Travel Award" for the Wild Jordan Nature Center in Amman, 2010
- King Abdullah II ibn Al Hussein Order for Distinction in 2026.

== Project gallery ==
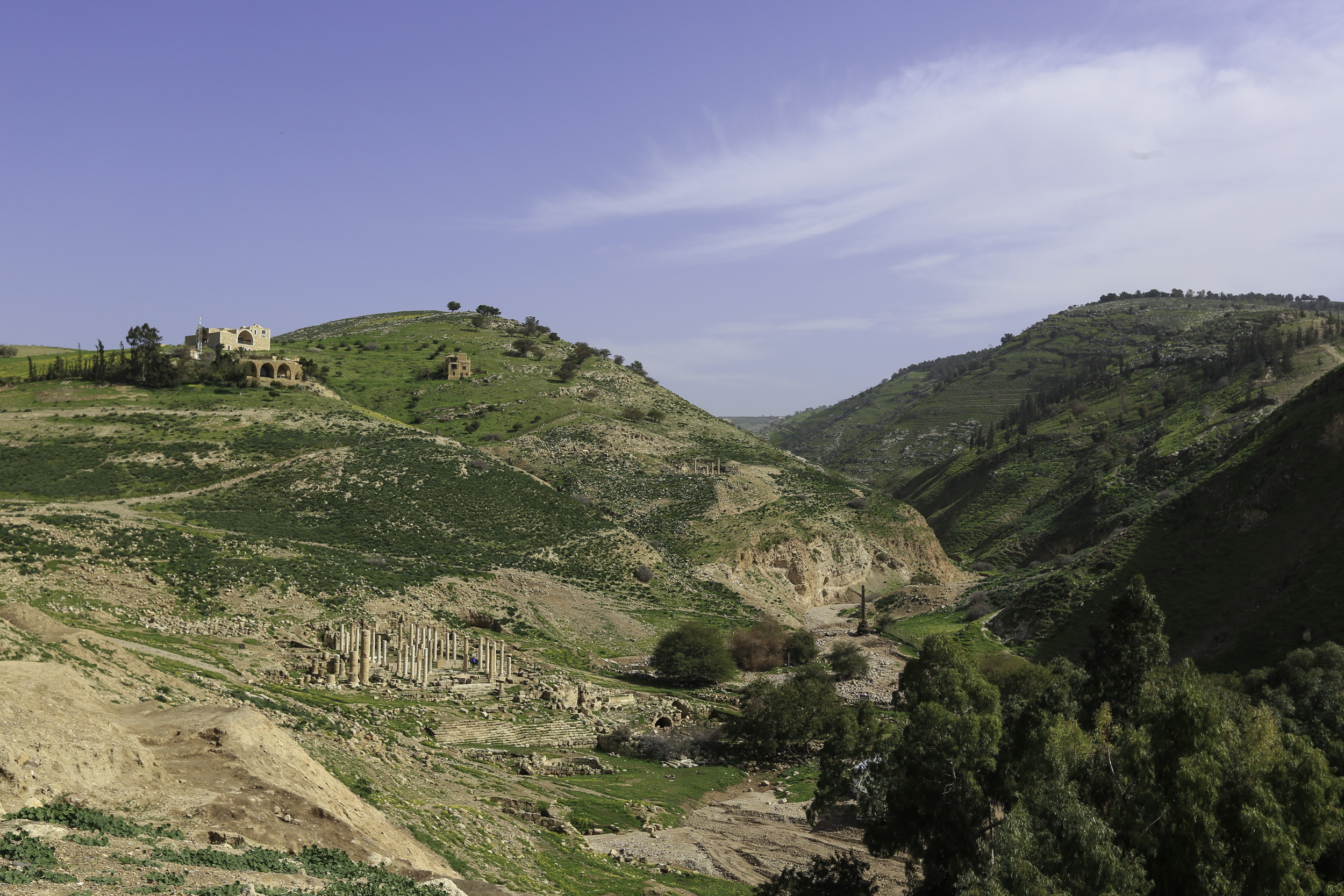
Museum, guesthouse and painters house overlooking the ancient Roman city of Pella, Jordan

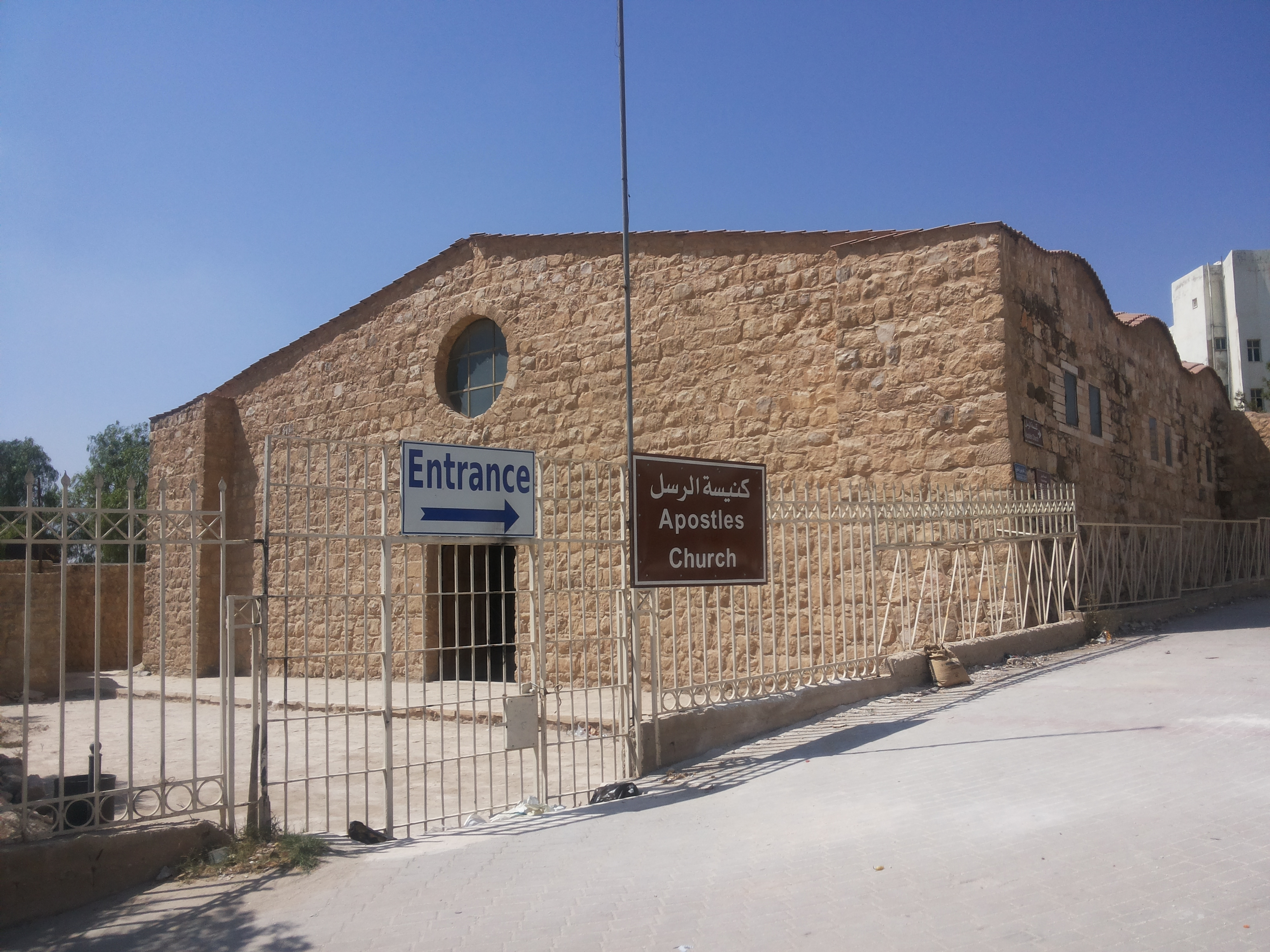
Church of the Apostles at Madaba archaeological park

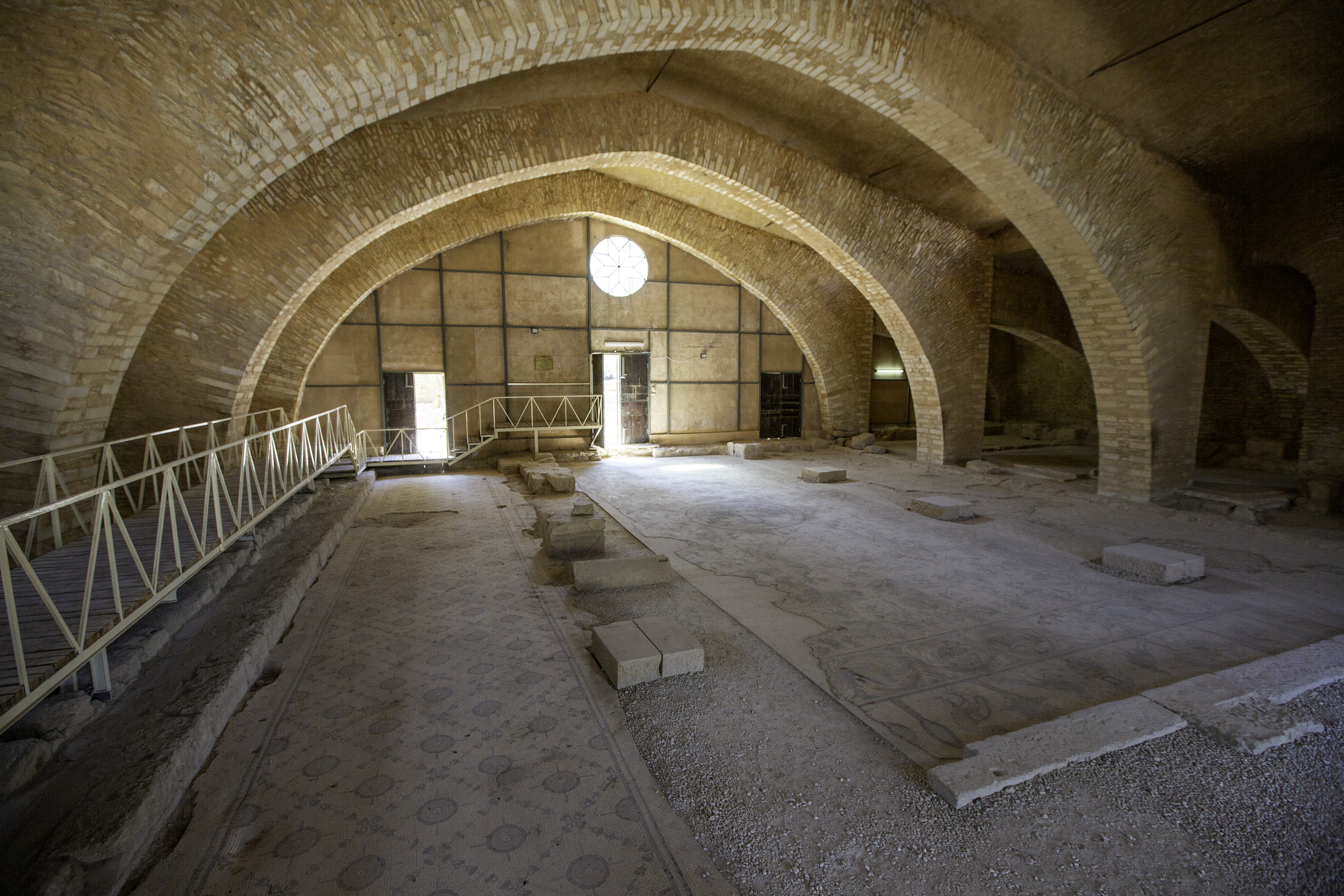
Church of the Apostles at Madaba archaeological park

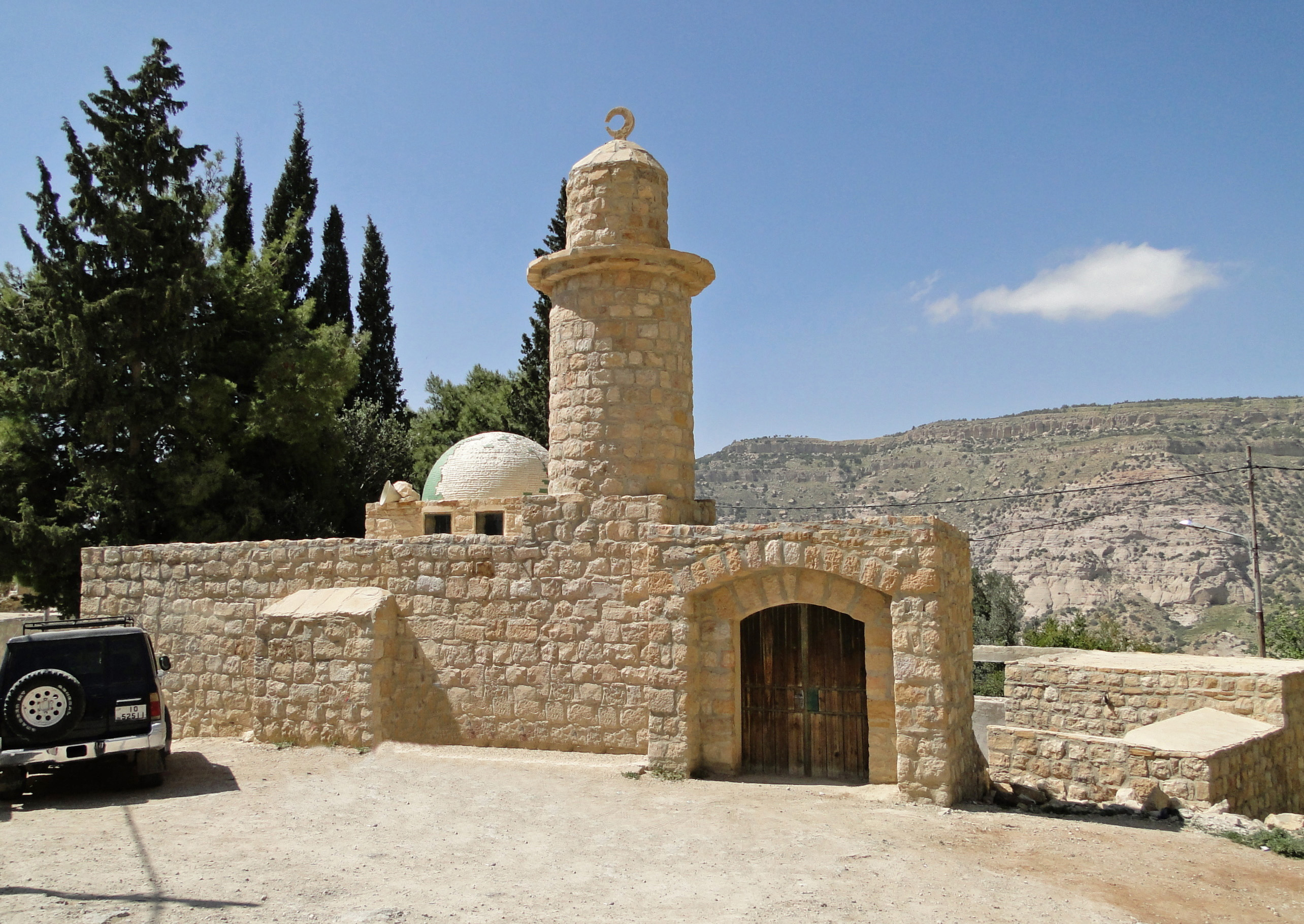
Restoration of Dana village, Jordan

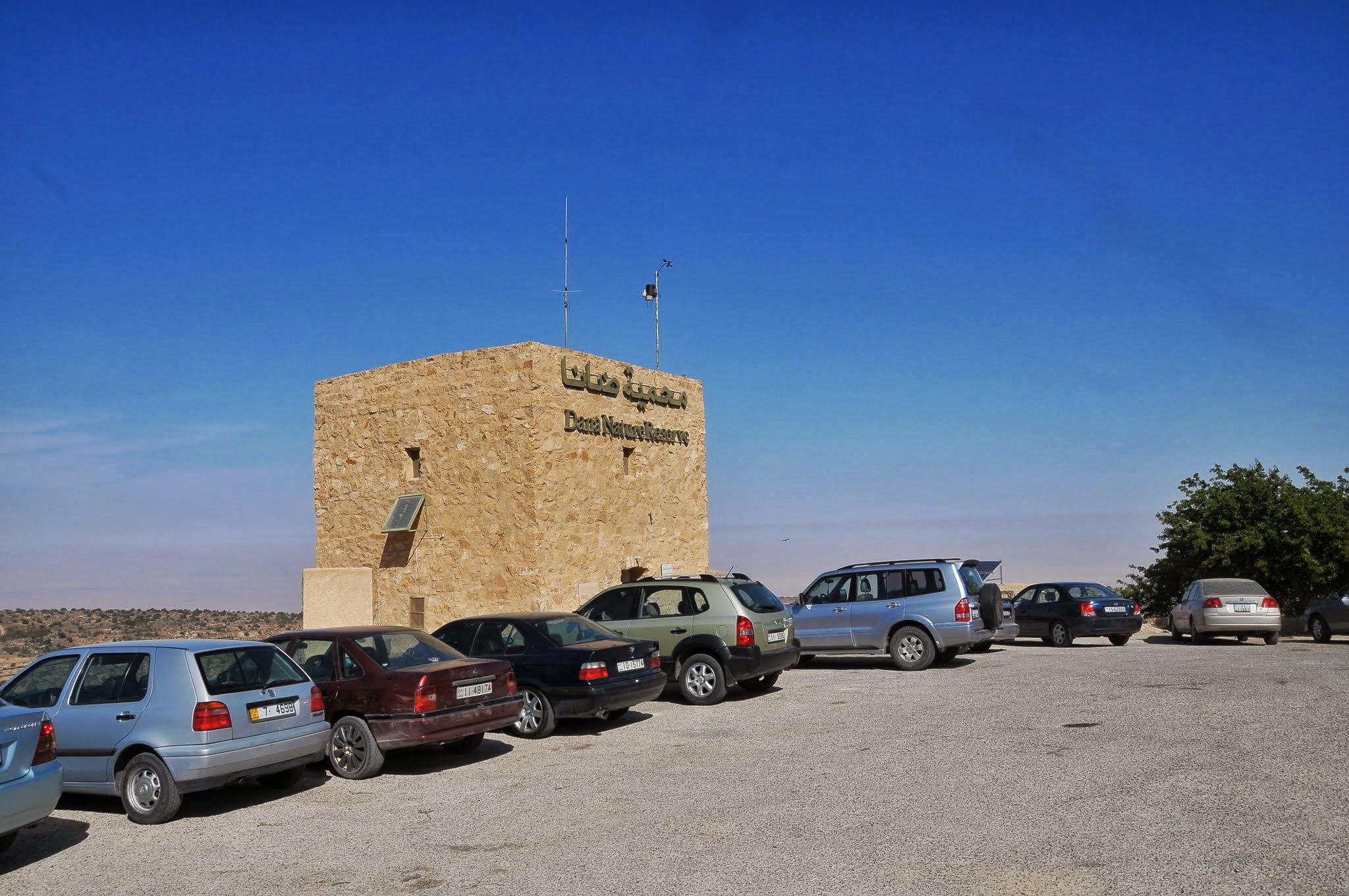
Entrance to the Dana Biosphere Reserve, Jordan

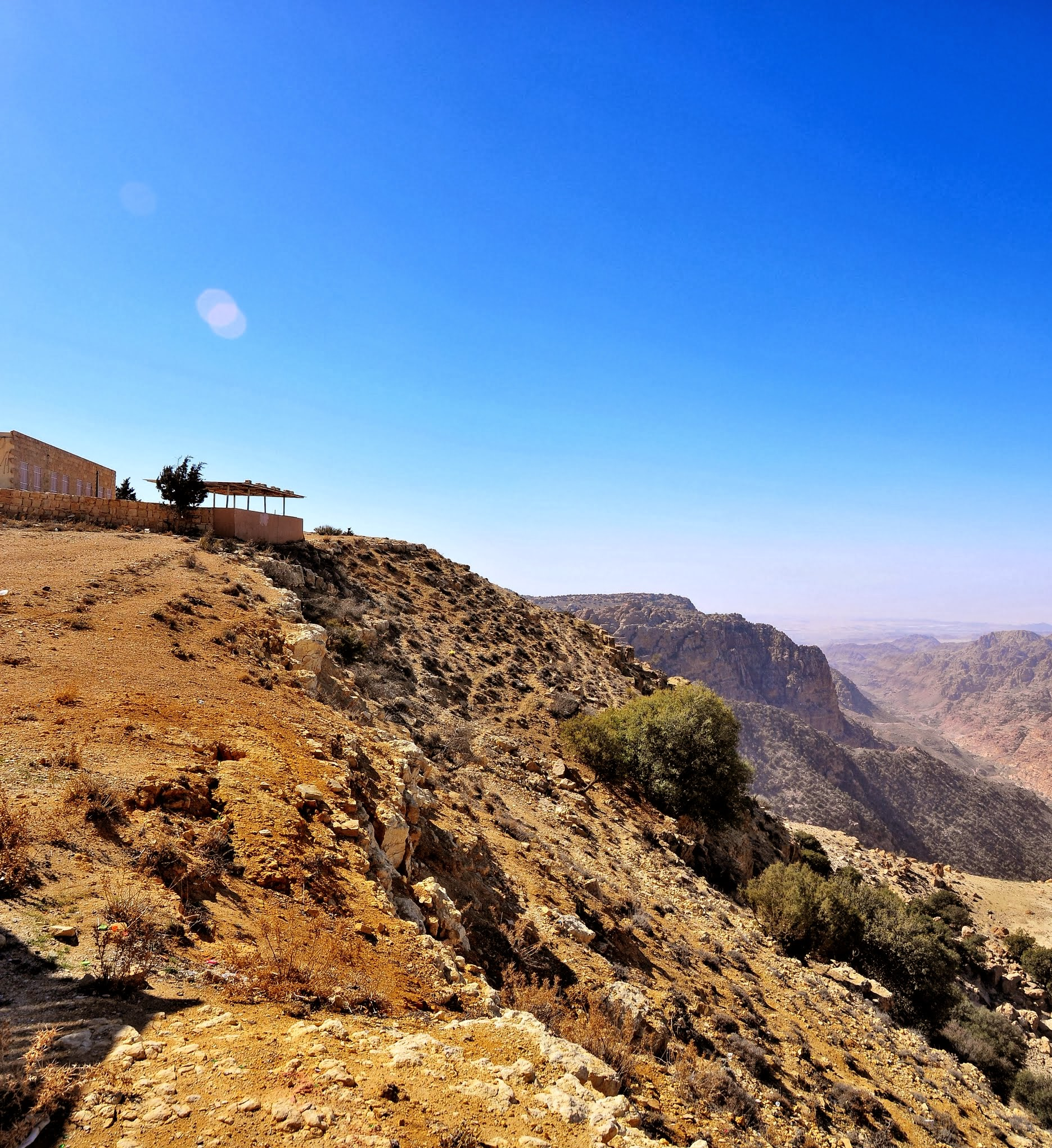
Viewpoint overlooking Dana biosphere reserve

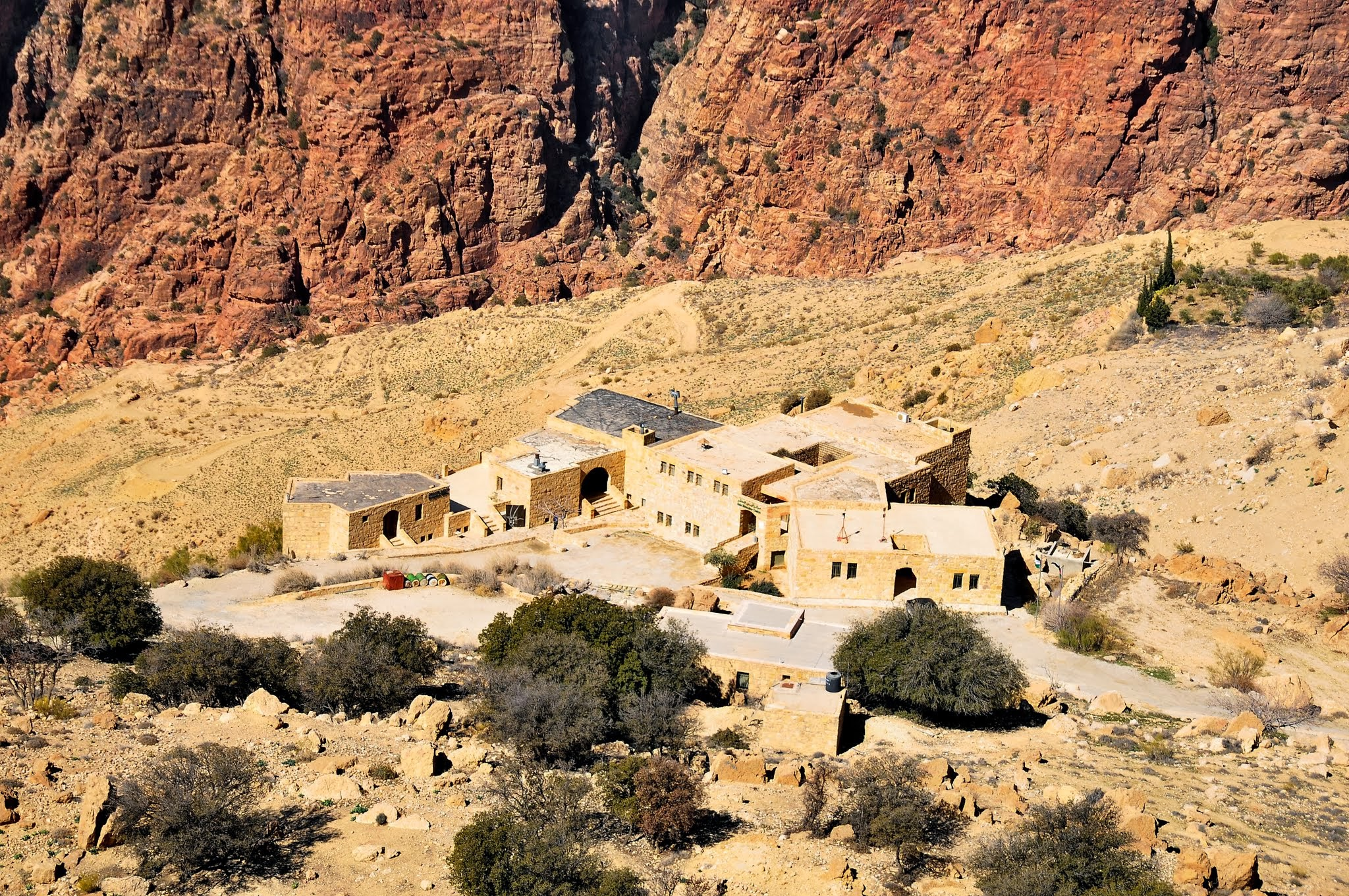
Dana Lodge at Dana biosphere Reserve

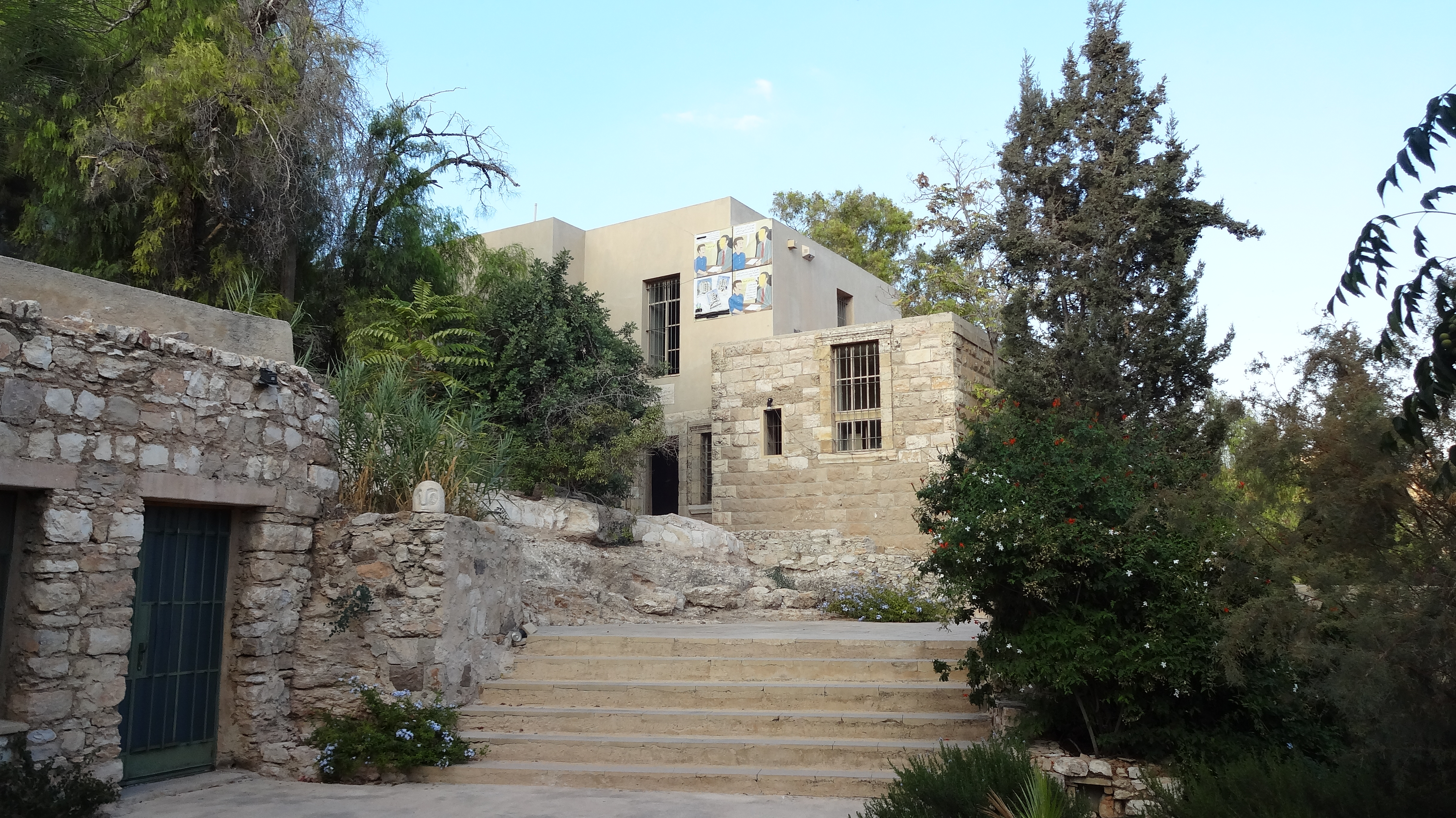
Restoration of Darat al Funun Arab Arts Center in Amman, Jordan

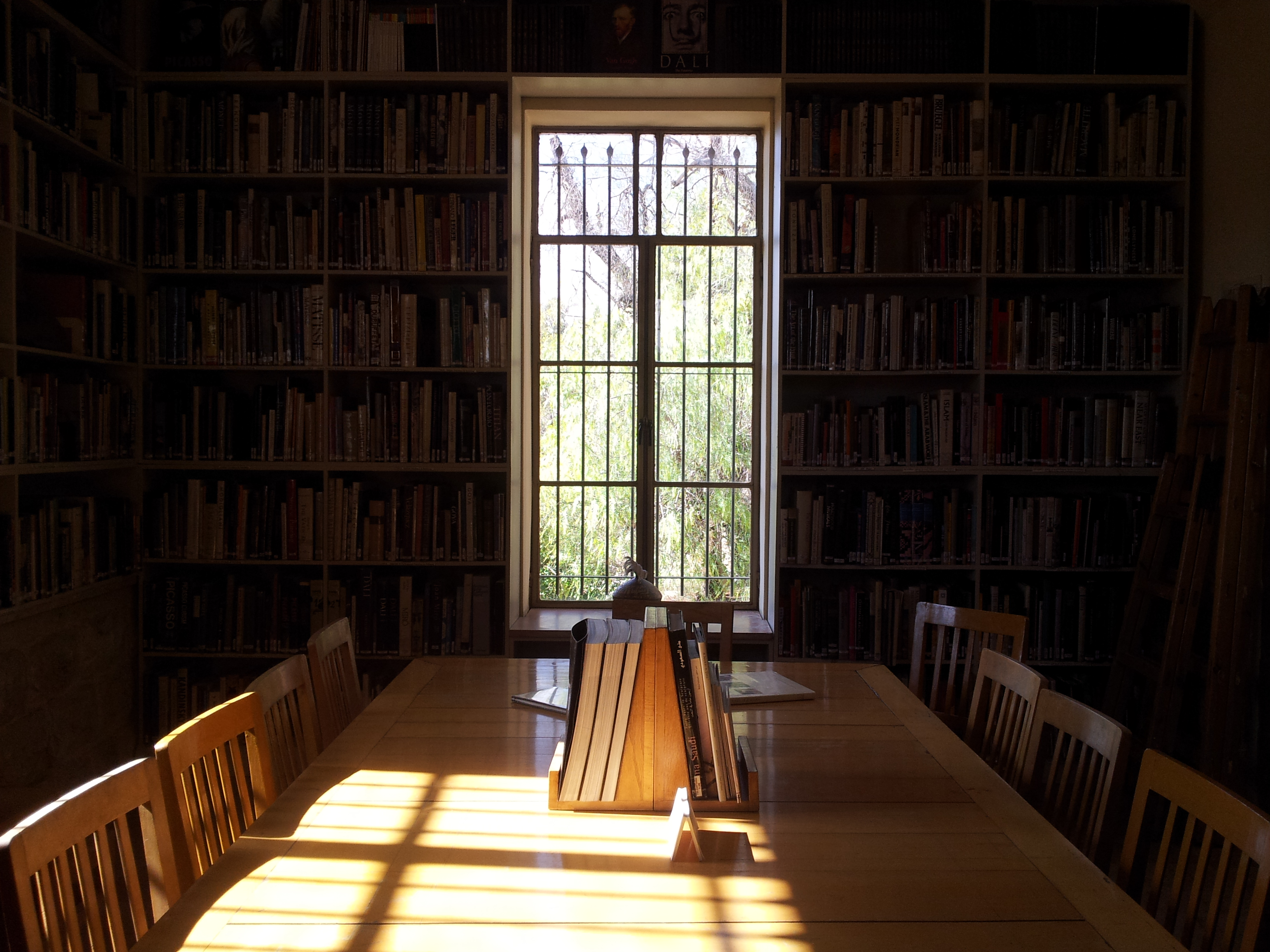
Restoration of Darat Al Funun Library, Amman

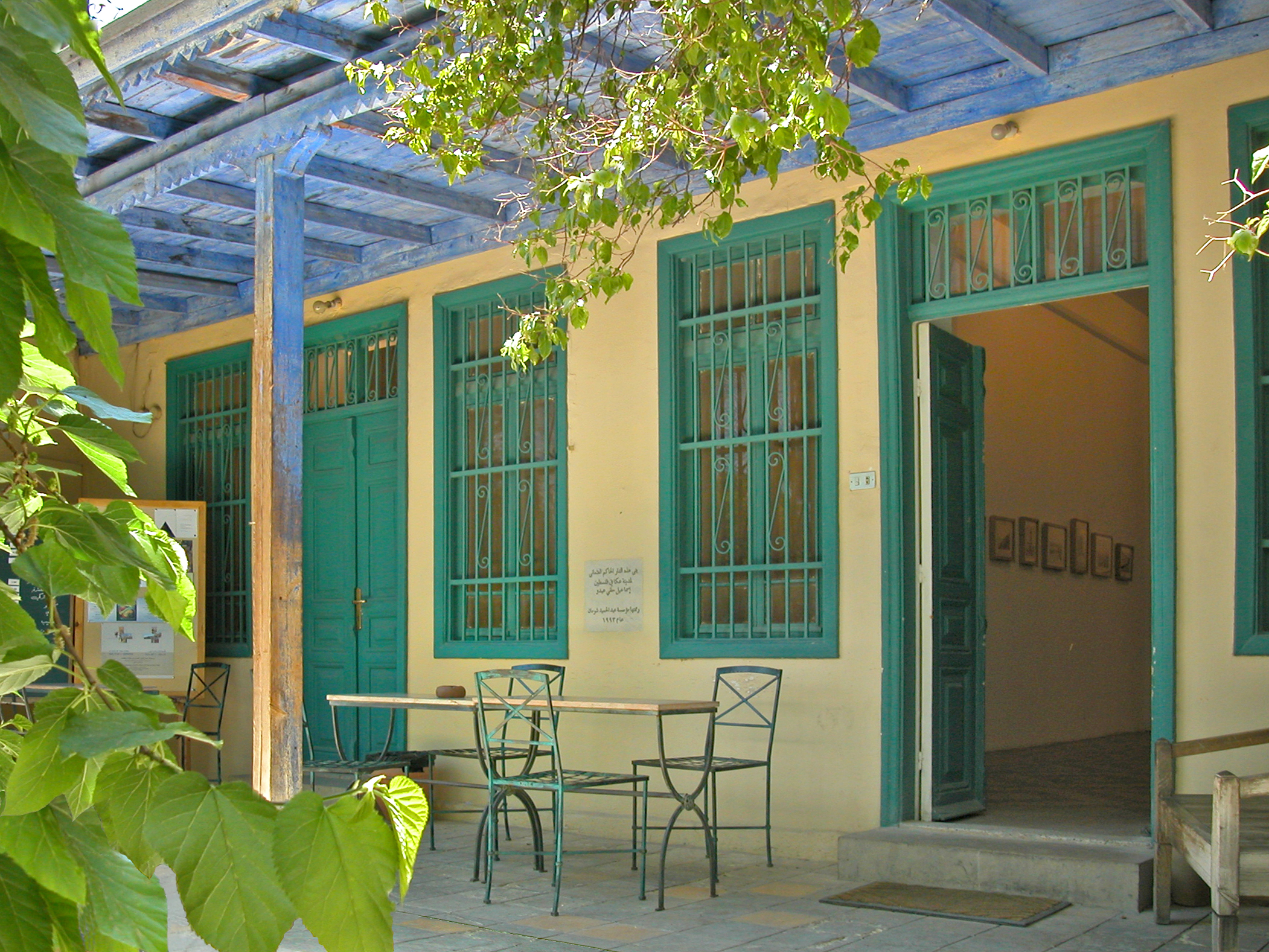
Restoration of the blue house at Darat al Funun Arab Arts Center in Amman, Jordan

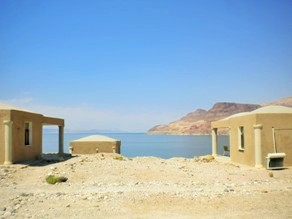
Wadi Mujib guesthouses

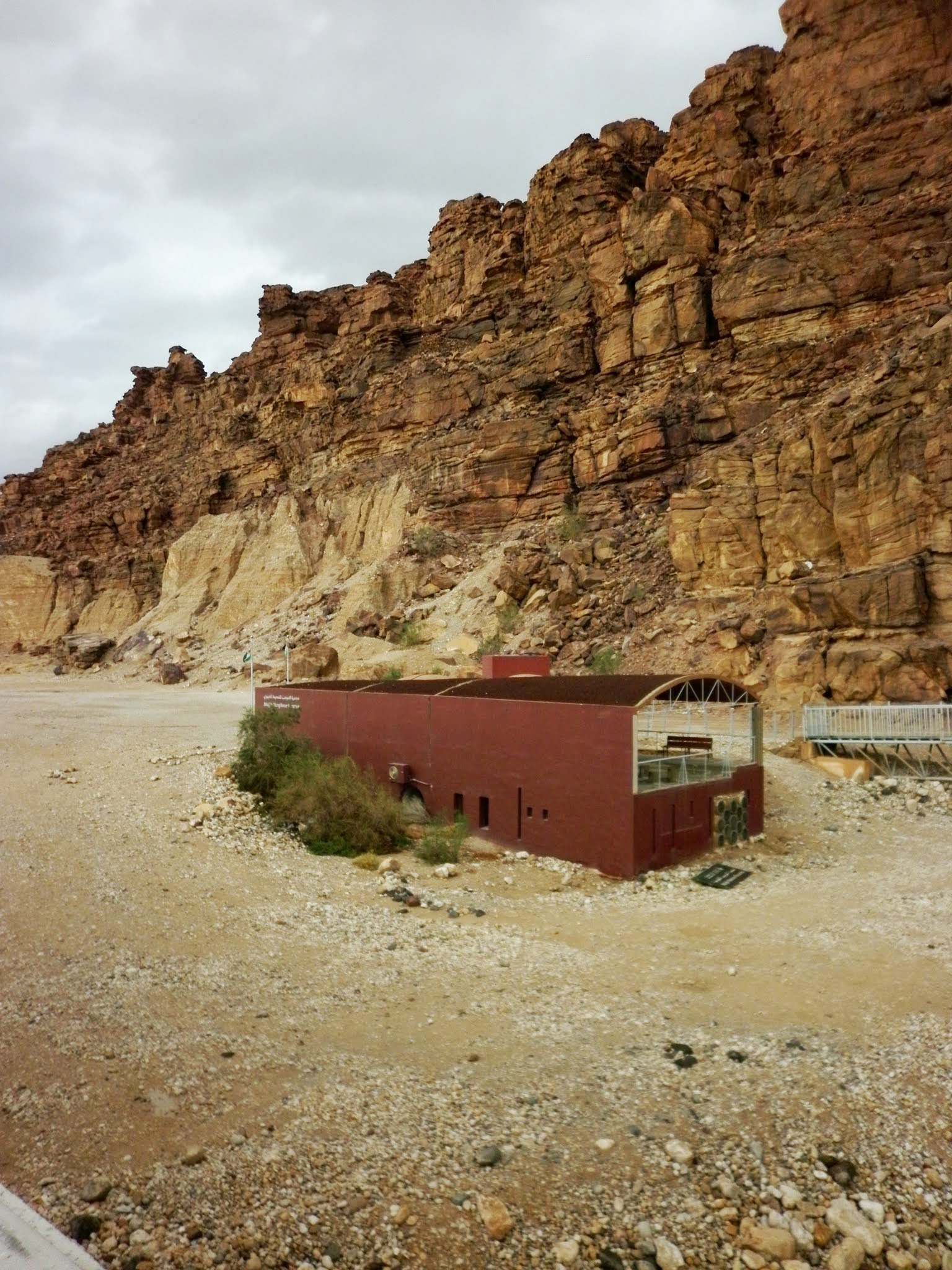
Entrance to the Wadi Mujib biosphere reserve

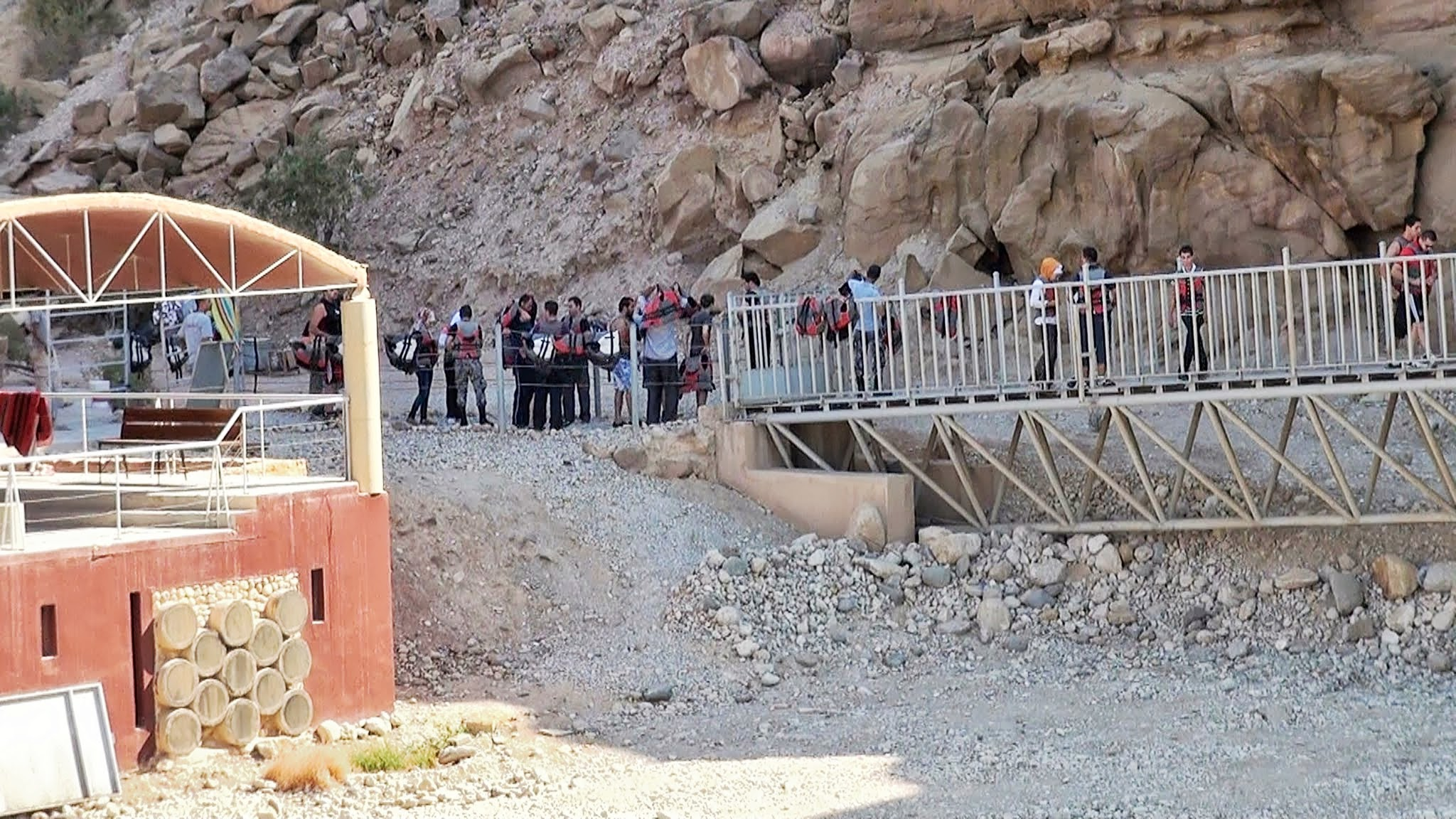
Entrance building to the wadi mujib biosphere reserve with passive cooling pipes

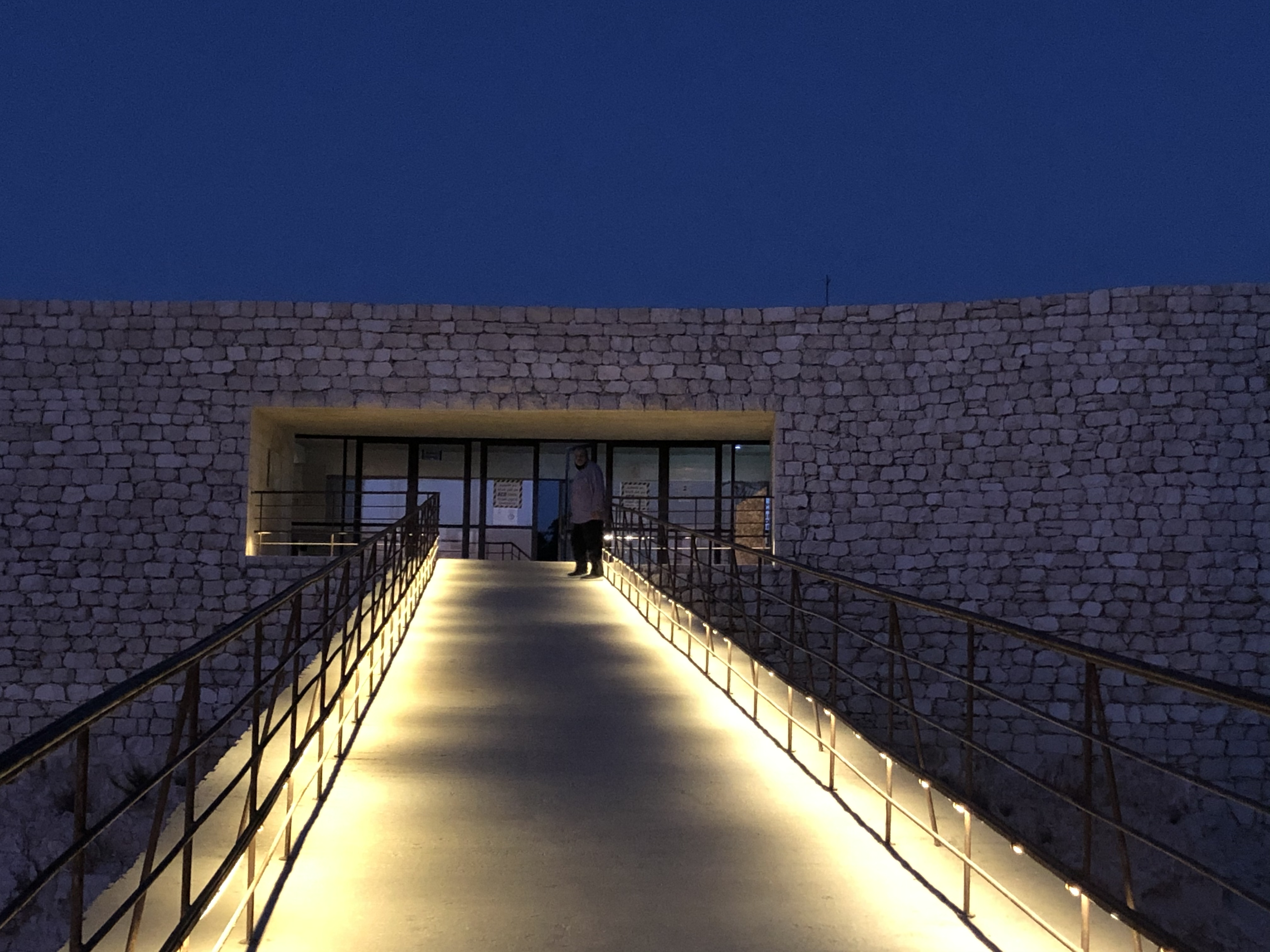
Royal Academy for Nature Conservation in Ajloun, Jordan

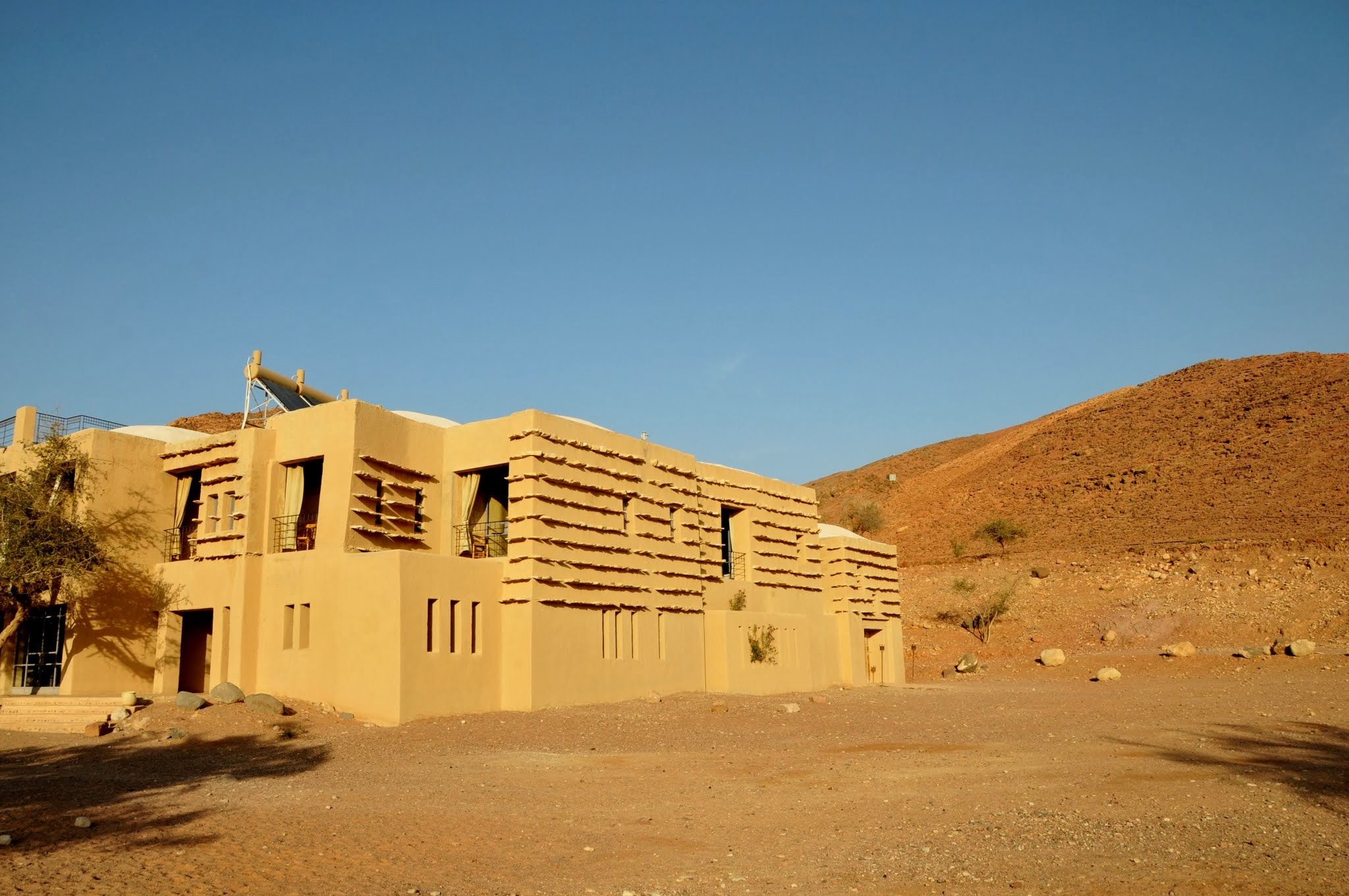
Fenan eco lodge

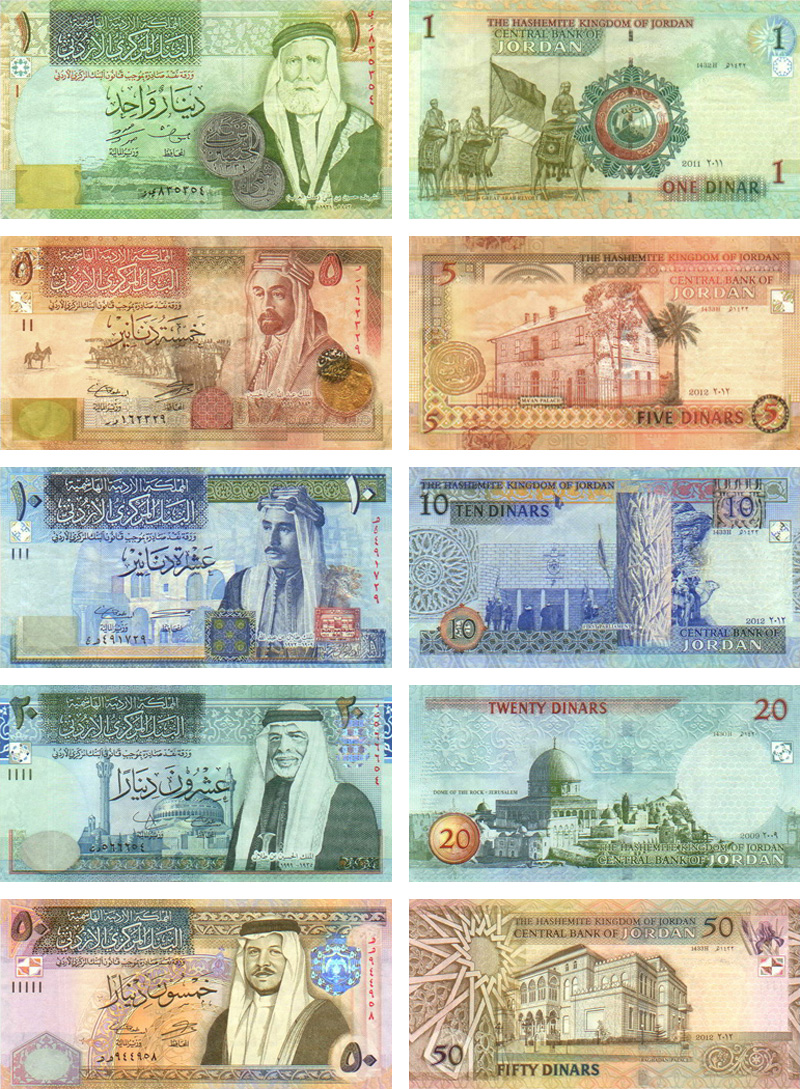
4th series of the Jordanian Dinar paper currency designed by Ammar Khammash

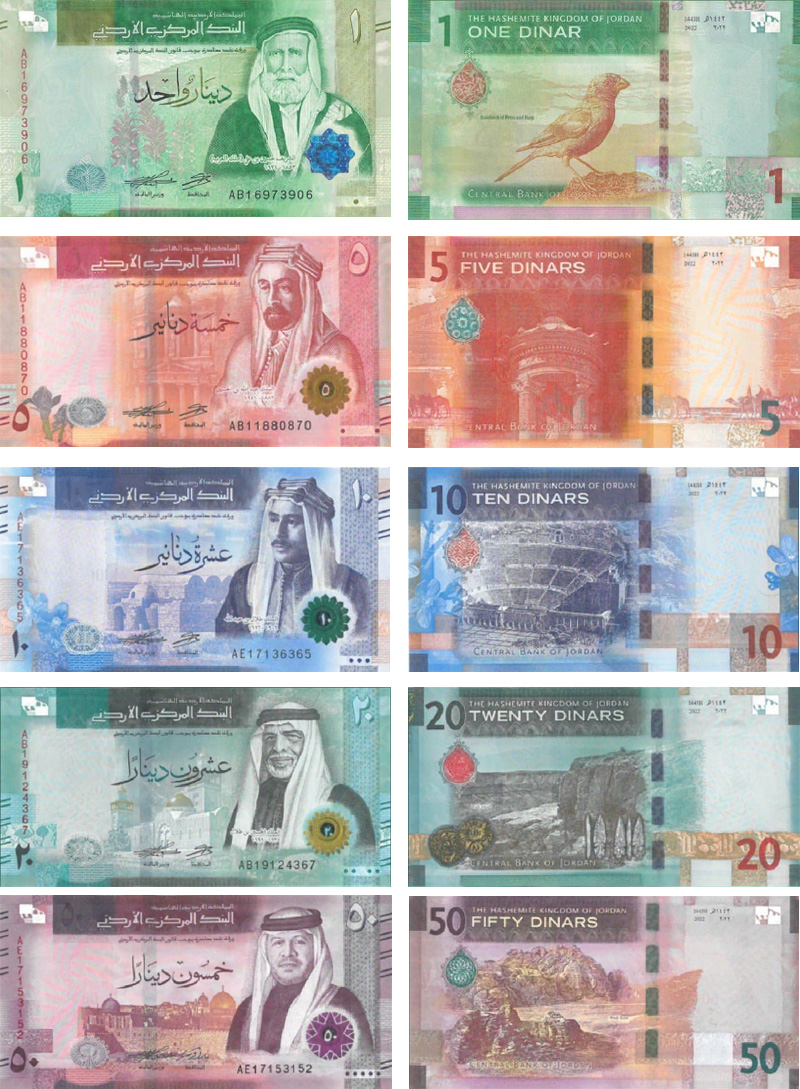
5th series of the Jordanian Dinar paper currency designed by Ammar Khammash

== See also ==
- Rasem Badran
- Ibrahim Salem
