= Zara Investment Holding =

Jordanian investment holding company

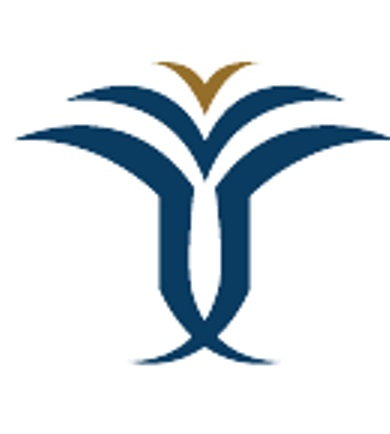
- Native name: شركة زارة للاستثمار القابضة
- Type: Holding Company
- Industry: Tourism, Investments
- Founded: May 10, 1994 in Amman, Jordan
- Founder: Sabih al-Masri, Khalil Al-Talhouni
- Headquarters: Amman, Jordan
- Area served: Jordan
- Key people: Sabih al-Masri (chairman)
- Products: Tourism، Hotel
- Website: www.zaraholding.com

Zara Investment Holding Co Ltd. was founded on 10 May 1994 by Sabih al-Masri, the current chairman, and Khalil Talhouni, in addition to a number of investors and local banks and Arab and international investment companies, such as the International Finance Corporation (IFC).

Zara invests primarily in tourism; particularly, in the hotels sector. Zara is one of the largest investment groups in Jordan.

Zara owns the most 5-star hotels in Jordan, with seven, including: Dead Sea, Petra and Amman. The number of hotel rooms owned by Zara Investment is 2131; which equals 30% of the total of 5-star hotel rooms in Jordan, and 26% of the workforce.

== See also ==
- Mövenpick Hotels & Resorts
- Movenpick Dead Sea Spa and Resort
- Intercontinental Jordan Hotel
- Mövenpick Resort Petra

== Gallery ==
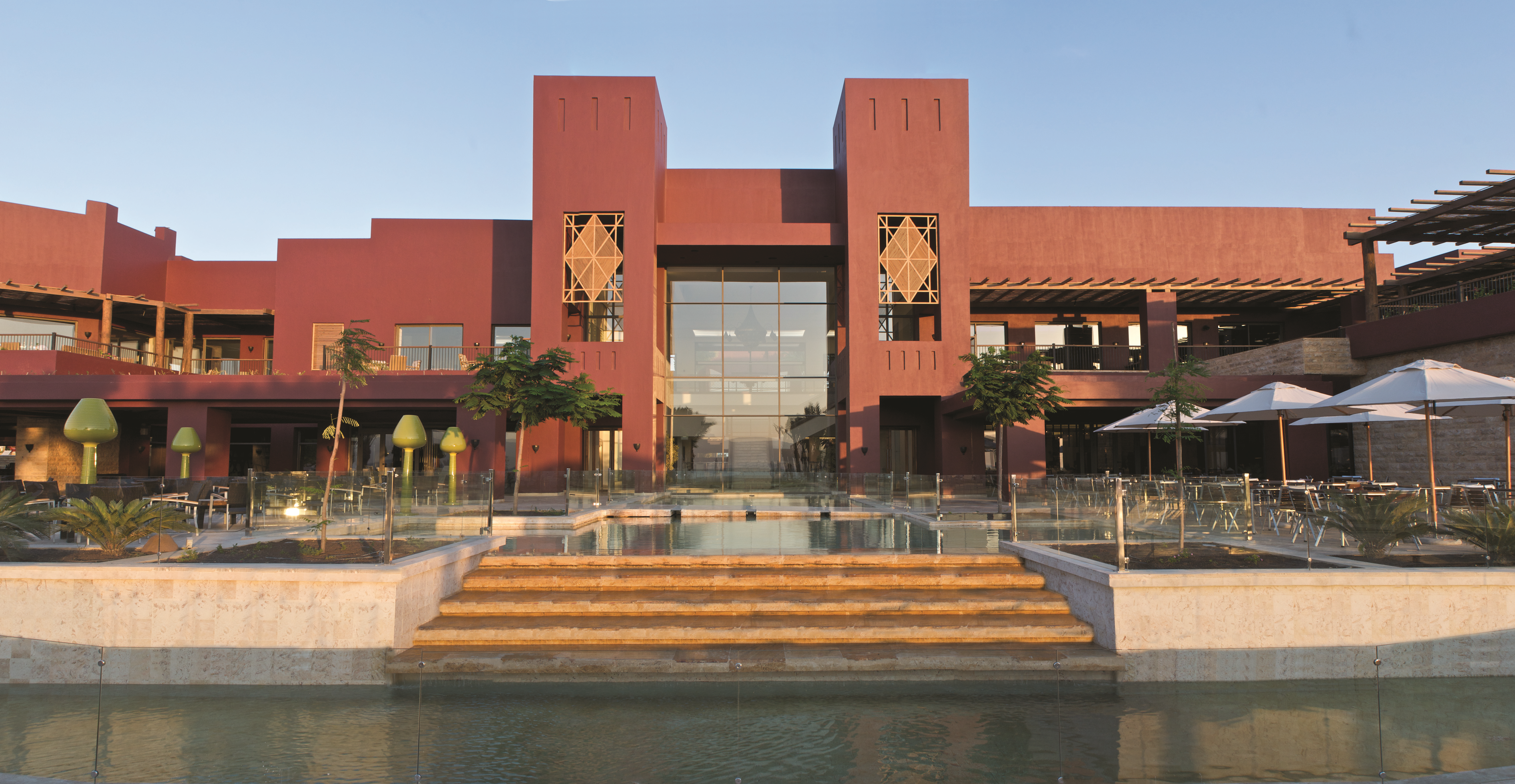
Movenpick Tala Bay - Aqaba

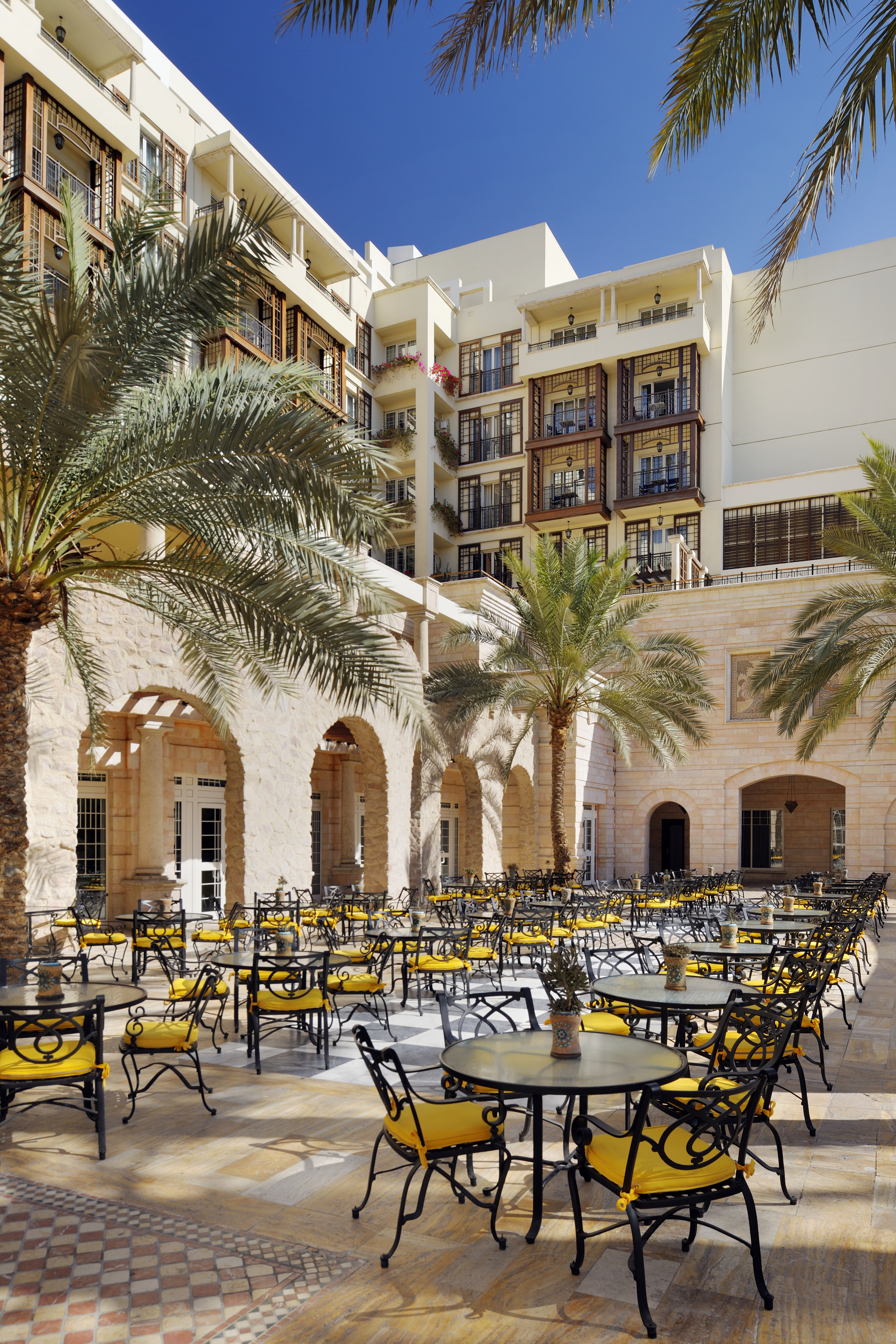
Movenpick City Center - Aqaba

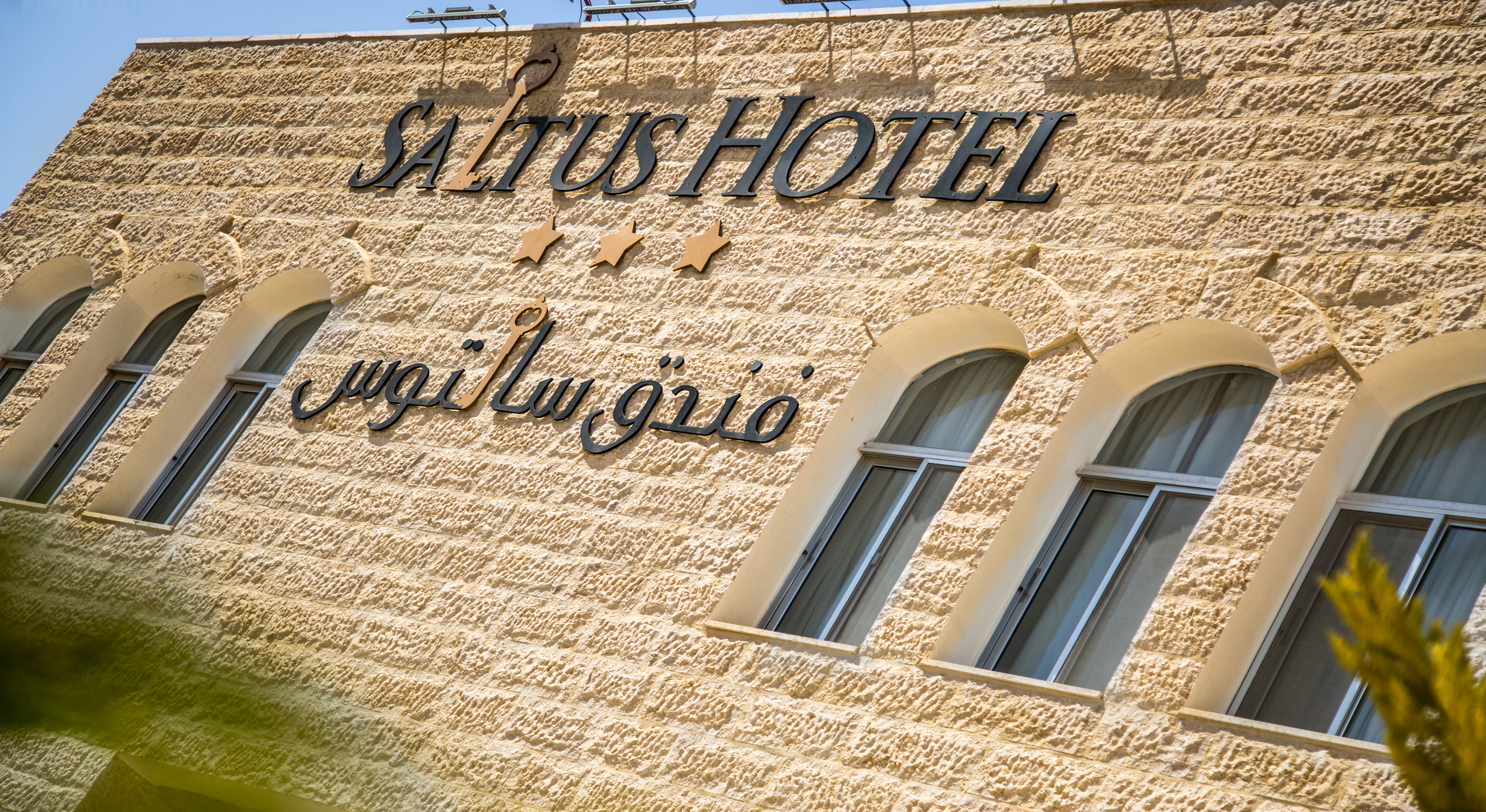
Saltus Hotel - Al-Salt

Hyatt Amman Hotel

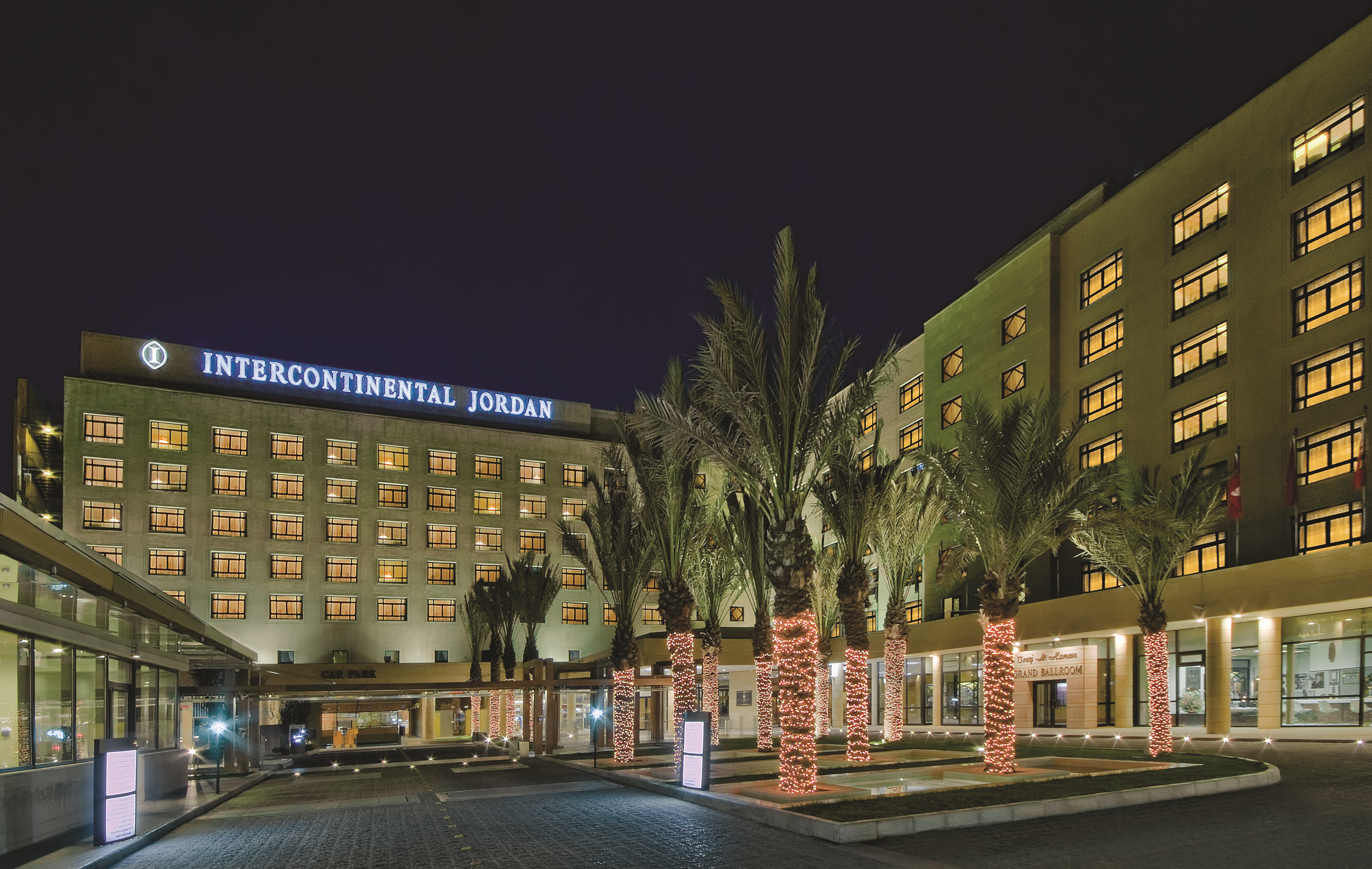
Intercontinental Hotel - Amman

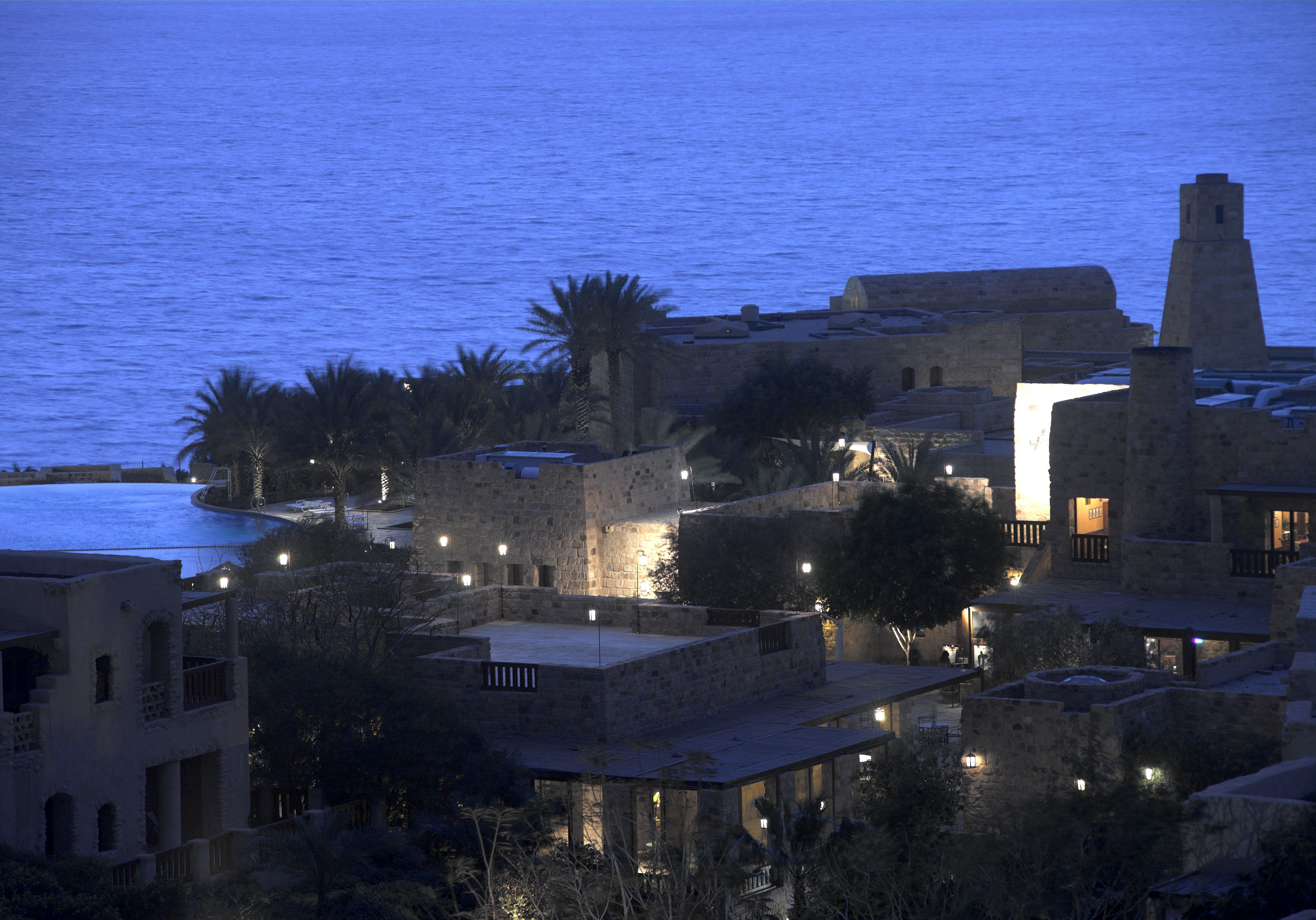
Movenpick Dead Sea

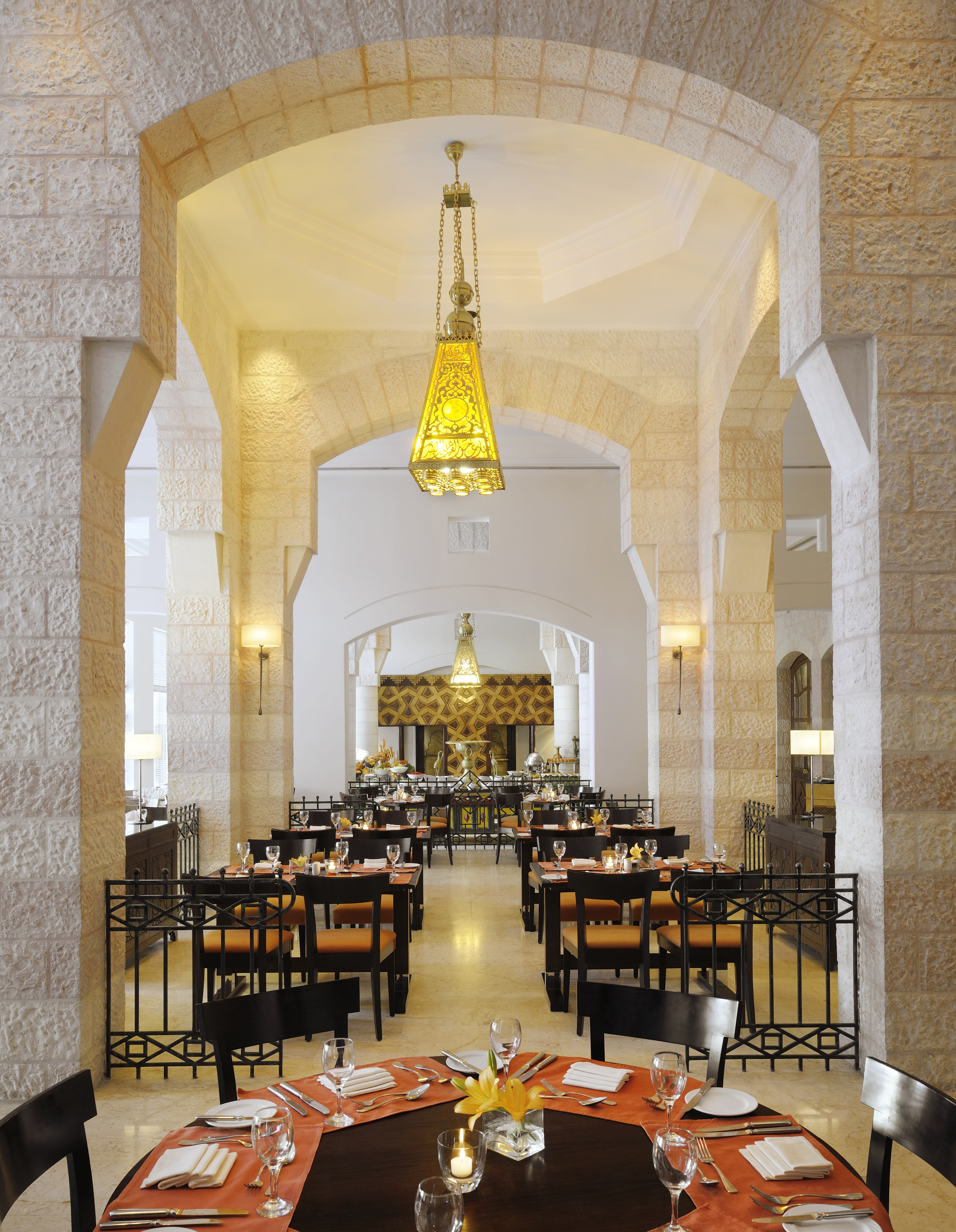
Movenpick Resort Petra
