= Tarhouni =

Tarhouni is an Arabic surname. Notable people with the surname include:

- Ali Tarhouni (born 1951), Libyan economist and politician
- Nader Al-Tarhouni (born 1979), Libyan footballer

== See also ==
- Talhouni
