= Intercontinental Jordan Hotel =

Historic hotel in Amman, Jordan

Coordinates: 31.953282°N 35.914017°E

InterContinental Jordan Hotel
- فندق إنتركونتيننتال الأردن
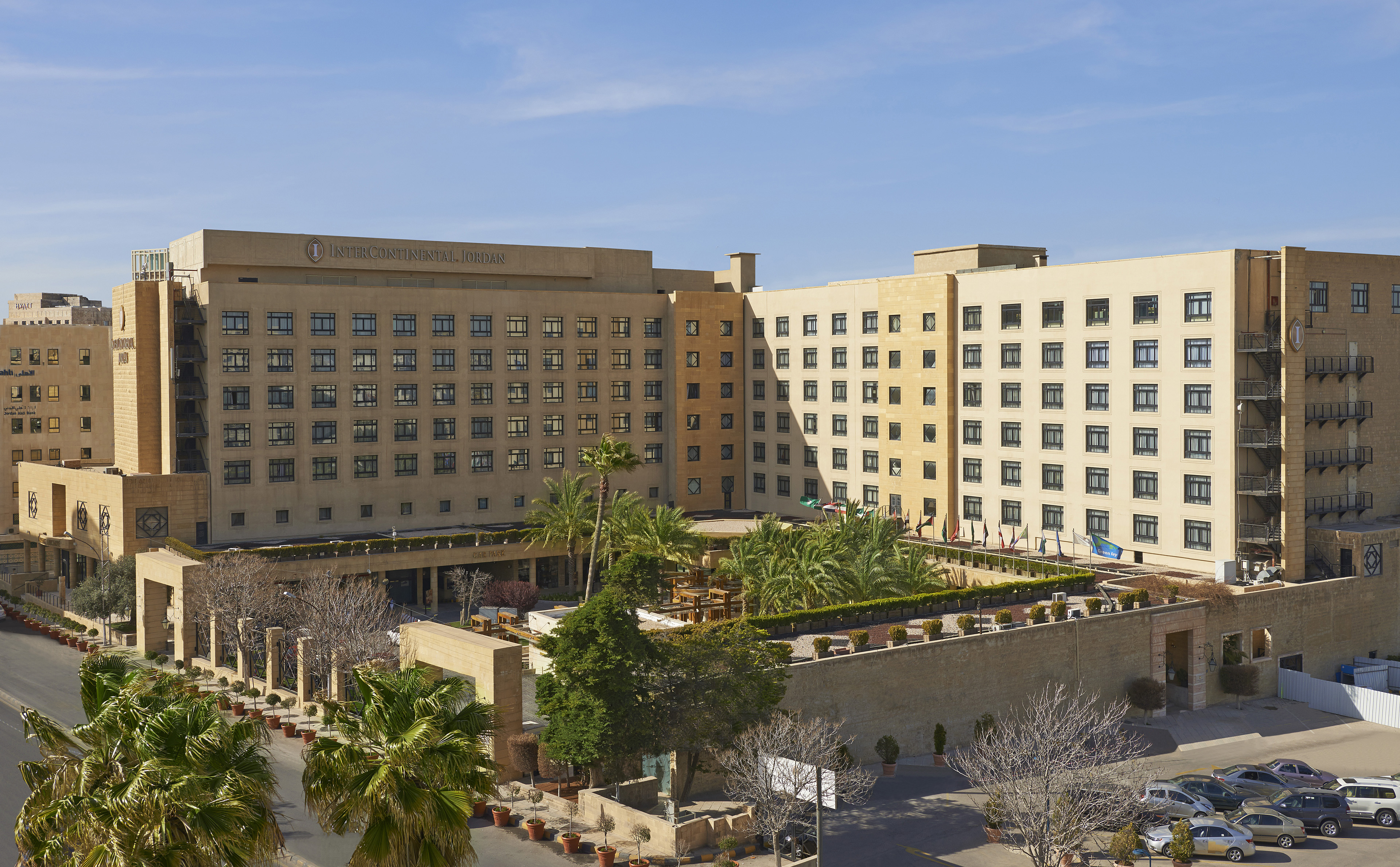
- Interactive map of the InterContinental Jordan Hotel area

General information
- Type: Hotel
- Classification: 5 stars
- Location: Amman, Jabal Amman, Islamic College Street, Jordan
- Opened: 1962
- Owner: Jordan Hotels and Tourism Co.

Height
- Height: 8 floors

Design and construction
- Known for: one of the oldest 5 star hotels in the area

Other information
- Number of rooms: 391 rooms, 49 suites

Website
- www.ihg.com/intercontinental/amman

The InterContinental Jordan Hotel is a historic hotel in Jabal Amman between the 2nd and 3rd circles in Amman, Jordan.

== History ==
The hotel was constructed by a Swiss-German company at a cost of $2 million, and opened in January 1962 as the Al Urdon Hotel. It joined Intercontinental Hotels on May 1, 1964 as the Hotel Jordan Intercontinental. It is operated by the Intercontinental Hotels Group and owned by the Jordan Hotels and Tourism Co. The hotel has 391 rooms and 49 suites, as well as internal and external swimming pools.

== See also ==
- Zara Investment Holding
- Tourism in Jordan
- Intercontinental Hotels Group
