= King Abdullah II ibn Al Hussein Order for Distinction =

Awarded by Abdullah II of Jordan
- Type: State
- Country: Jordan
- Status: Currently awarded
- Founder: Abdullah II of Jordan
- Classes: 5 Classes

The King Abdullah II ibn Al Hussein Order for Distinction is bestowed by King Abdullah II of Jordan upon prominent figures with notable contributions who have rendered distinguished services or exceptional dedication. This medal is considered one of the highest Jordanian royal honors presented to outstanding individuals in all fields. The medal consists of five classes.

== Notable recipients ==
- Prince Faisal bin Hussein
- Ahmad Abughaush
- Ammar Khammash
- Omar M. Yaghi
- Jalal Barjas
- Walid Saif
- Nizar Haddad
