= Mövenpick Resort Petra =

Movenpick Resort Petra
- منتجع موفنبيك البتراء
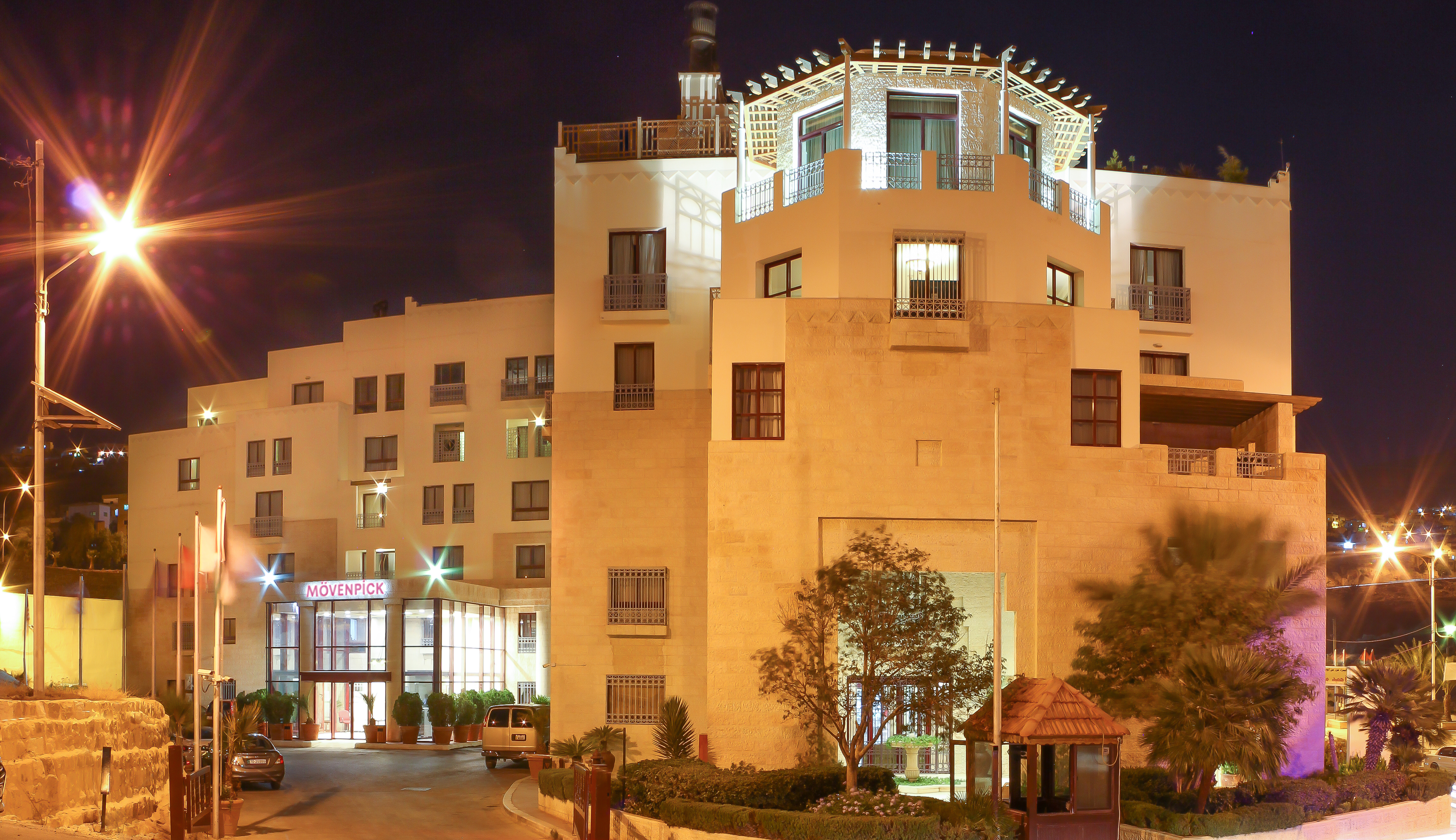
- Interactive map of the Movenpick Resort Petra area

General information
- Type: Hotel, Resort
- Classification: 5 Stars
- Location: Petra, Tourism Str. Petra, Jordan
- Coordinates: 30.3255°N 35.4695°E
- Opened: 1996

Technical details
- Floor area: square meters

Design and construction
- Known for: One of the biggest resorts in Petra

Other information
- Number of rooms: 183 rooms and suites
- Parking: Yes

Mövenpick Resort Petra is a five-star hotel located at the entrance of historic Petra in Wadi Musa in Jordan. It is about 110 km from King Hussein International Airport and 200 km from Queen Alia International Airport. Opened in 1996, the hotel is operated by Mövenpick Hotels & Resorts, currently a brand of Accor. The hotel is not to be confused with the nearby Grand Mercure Petra, which for many years was known as Mövenpick Nabataean Castle Hotel. Grand Mercure Petra is located 10 minutes away from Petra by car, while Mövenpick Resort Petra is right by the ancient city's entrance.

The hotel features an oriental-Islamic architecture style, where natural stones and hand-crafted woodwork is merged. Islamic architecture is noticed in the interior designs. The hotel includes 183 rooms and suites and 7 restaurants. The architect was Rasem Badran.

== See also ==
- Zara Investment Holding
- Tourism in Jordan
- Petra

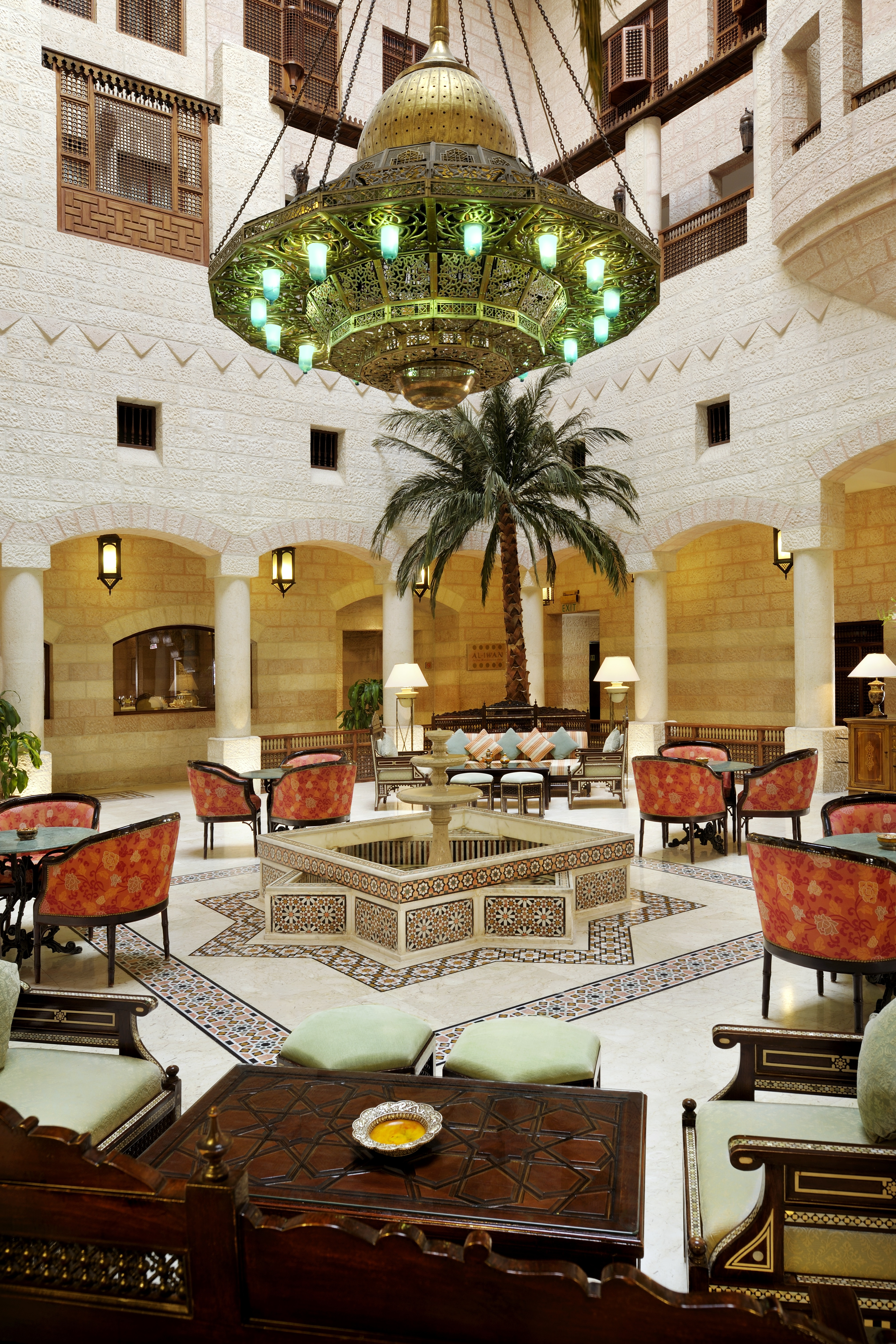
