= Nabil Talhouni =

Jordanian diplomat

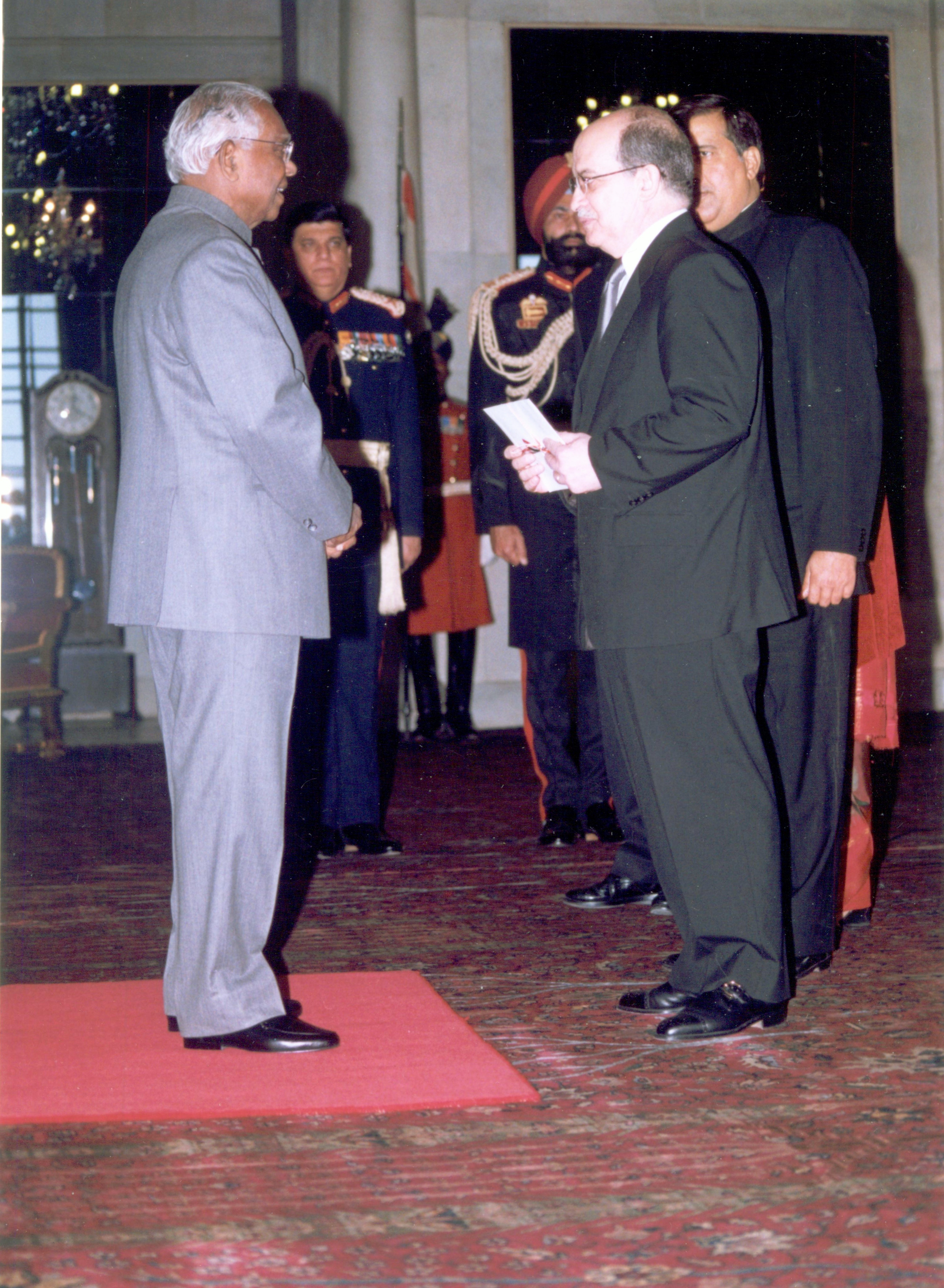
- Kocheril Raman Narayanan & Nabil Talhouni

Consul General to Dubai
- In office June 1, 1985 – January 1, 1987

Ambassador to Kuwait
- In office January 1, 1987 – Gulf War October 1990

Ambassador to Austria
- In office January 1, 1991 – July 1, 1993

Ambassador to Hungary
- In office January 1, 1991 – July 1, 1993

Ambassador to Czech Republic
- In office January 1, 1991 – July 1, 1993

Ambassador to U.A.E
- In office January 1, 1996 – January 1, 1999

Ambassador to India
- In office January 1, 2001 – January 1, 2006

Ambassador to Thailand
- In office January 1, 2001 – January 1, 2006

Ambassador to Sri Lanka
- In office January 1, 2001 – January 1, 2006

Personal details
- Born: Jordan
- Spouse: Sabah Talhouni
- Children: Tawfiq, Nadya, Suha
- Parents: Tawfiq Khalil Talhouni (father); Suaad Abdul Kader Al-Jundi (mother)
- Website: Talhouni.com - Jordan

Nabil Talhouni (Arabic: نبيل التلهوني) is a Jordanian diplomat who has served as an Ambassador to a number of countries around the world.

== Biography ==
Nabil Talhouni was born in Jordan, and educated at the University of Bonn.

Talhouni worked for the Foreign Affairs of Jordan before becoming Jordan's Ambassador to Kuwait (1987–1990). He has also served as Ambassador to Austria (1991–1993), Ambassador to UAE (1996–1999), Ambassador to India (2001–2006), Ambassador to Thailand (2001–2006). He has also served in Dubai, London, Ottawa, Bern and Frankfurt.
