= Movenpick Dead Sea Spa and Resort =

Coordinates: 31.717249°N 35.587351°E

Mövenpick Resort & Spa Dead Sea
- منتجع وسبا موفنبيك البحر الميت
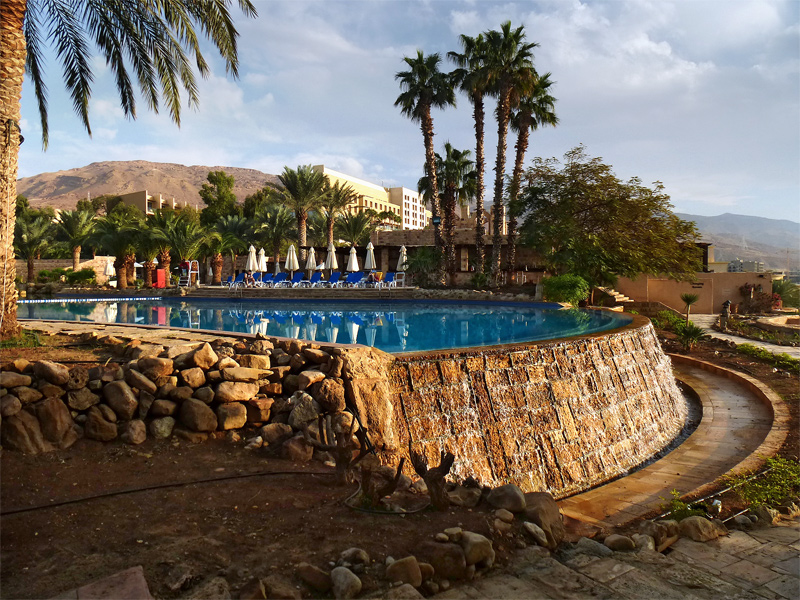
- Interactive map of the Mövenpick Resort & Spa Dead Sea area

General information
- Type: Hotel
- Classification: 5 Stars
- Location: Dead Sea, P.O. Box 815538, Amman 11180, Sweimah - Dead Sea, Jordan
- Opened: 1999
- Cost: 29 million Jordanian dinars

Technical details
- Floor area: 52,200 square meters

Design and construction
- Known for: One of the largest resorts in the Middle East

Other information
- Number of rooms: 346 rooms

Website
- www.moevenpick-hotels.com

The Mövenpick Dead Sea Spa and Resort is a luxury resort hotel on the shore of the Dead Sea, the lowest location on Earth. It was opened in 1999 by Zara Investment Holding, Jordan's largest operator of five-star hotels. Condé Nast has classified it as the best resort in Jordan and one of the best in the Middle East for several years.

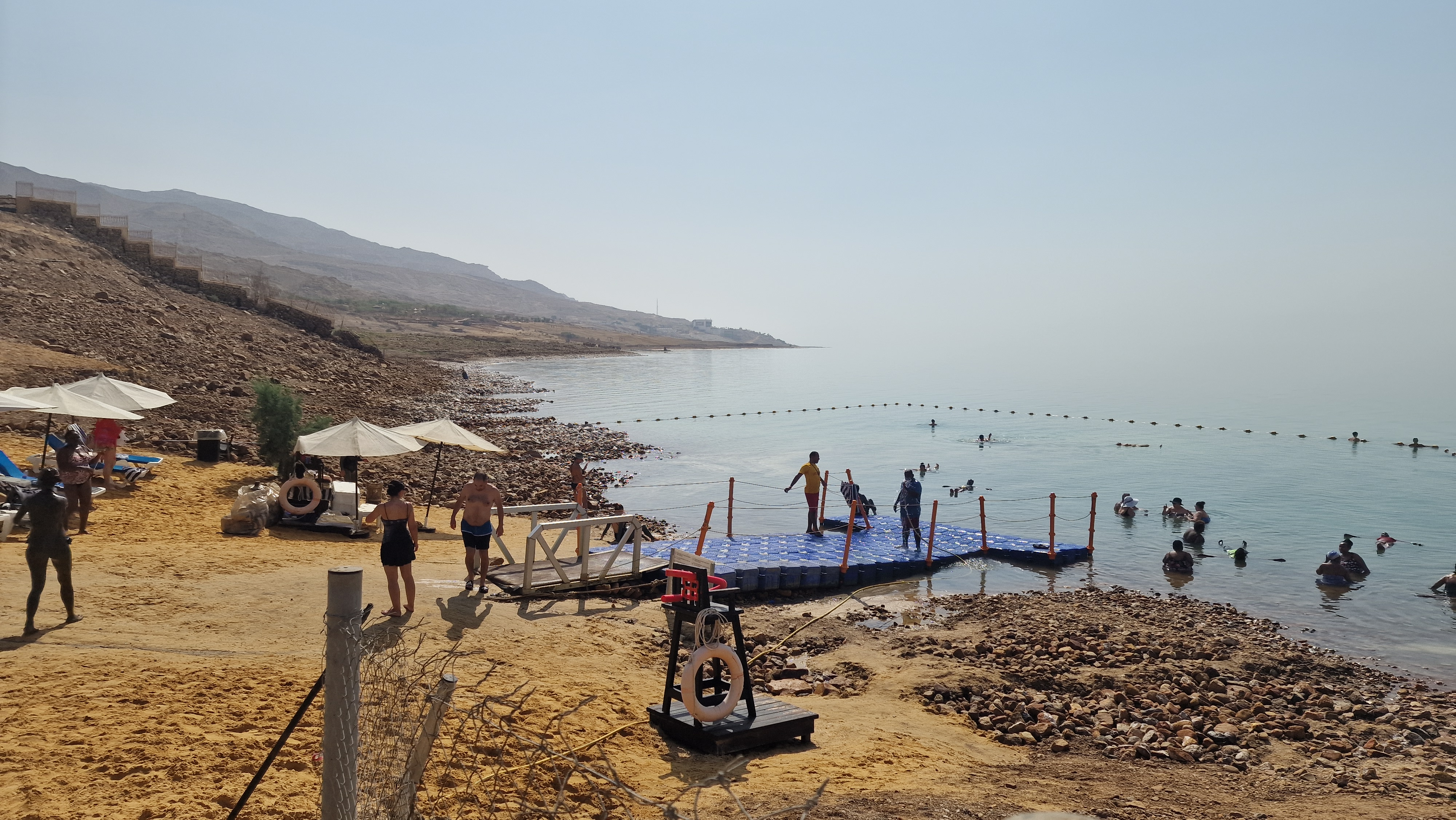
Swimming area at the Dead Sea

The resort is one of the largest in the Middle East. It is known for providing premium therapeutic services using the natural products of the Dead Sea, which are believed to have curative properties. It has 346 rooms and many other amenities, including swimming pools, a fitness centre, a children's club, nine restaurants, and a spa. The hotel, Green Globe certified since 2014, is one of the first in the region to utilize environmentally-friendly solar heating systems.

== See also ==
- Zara Investment Holding
- Tourism in Jordan
