= Ibrahim Salem =

Dubaite numismatist

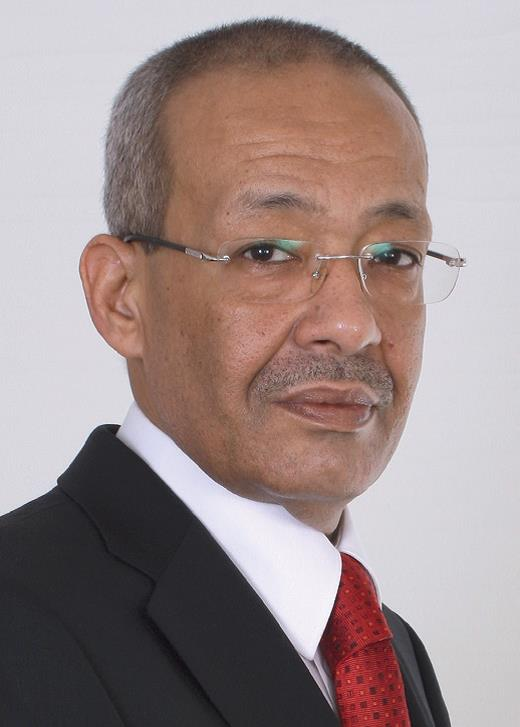
- Education: Architecture
- Occupation: Architect
- Known for: Banknote collection
- Spouse: Areej Salem

Ibrahim Salem (Arabic: إبراهيم سالم) is an architect and banknote collector residing in Dubai. He built a collection of more than 150,000 notes over 40 years with a specialisation in the notes of the Middle East, particularly the monetary history of Iraq during the Hashemite dynasty (1921–1958). He has been awarded the Al Hussein Medal of Merit, first class. His banknote collection is being sold through a series of auctions which began in 2013.

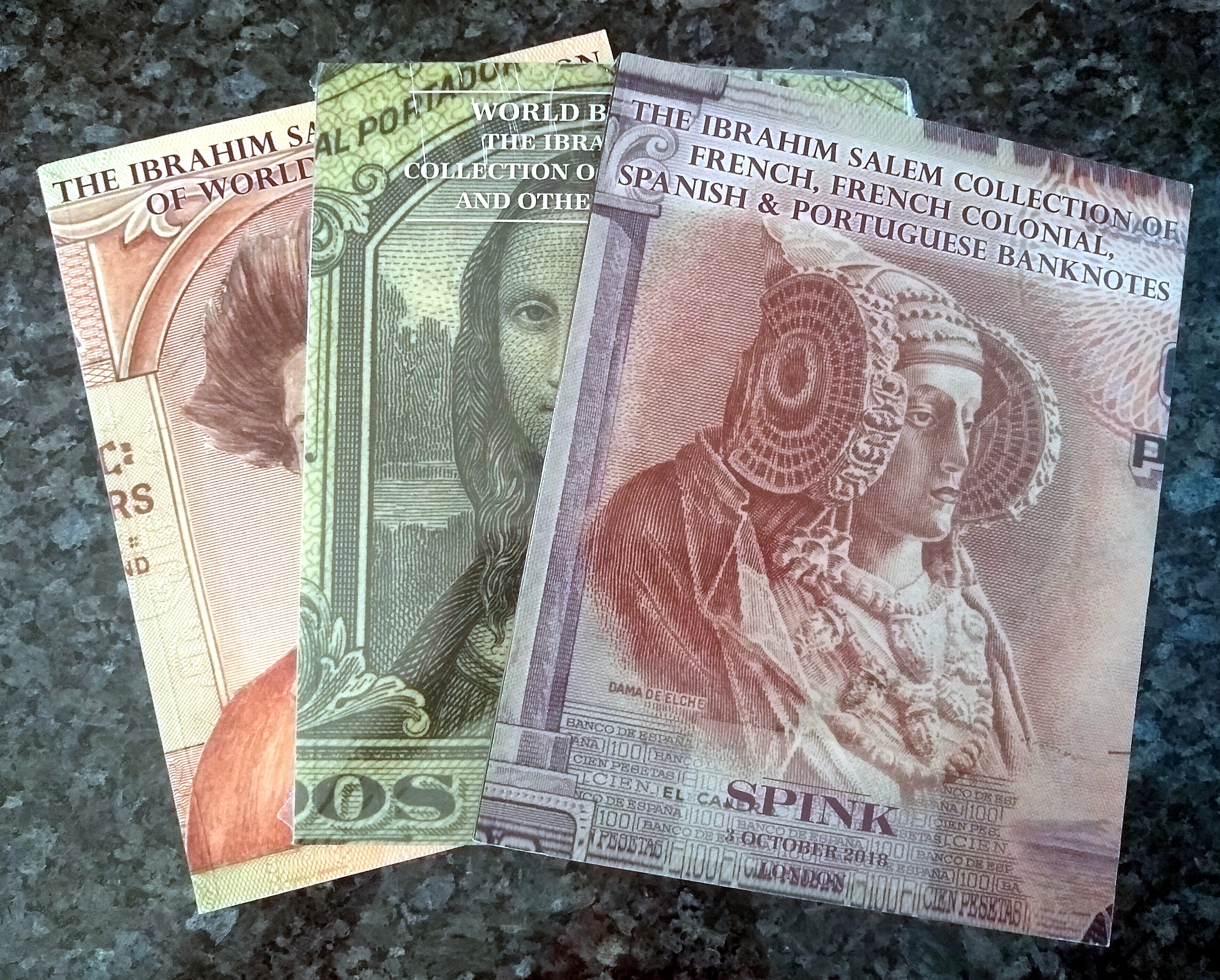
Auction catalogues for the Ibrahim Salem collection.

Salem practices as an architect in Dubai.

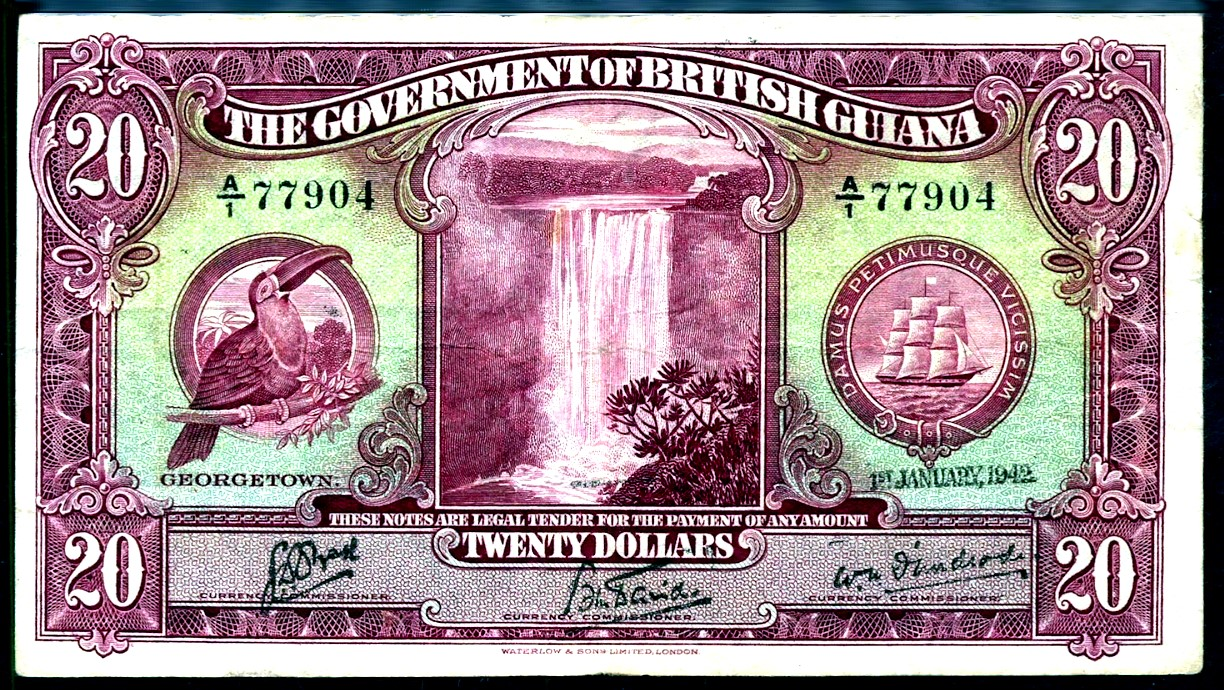
1942 British Guiana $20 banknote from the Salem collection.

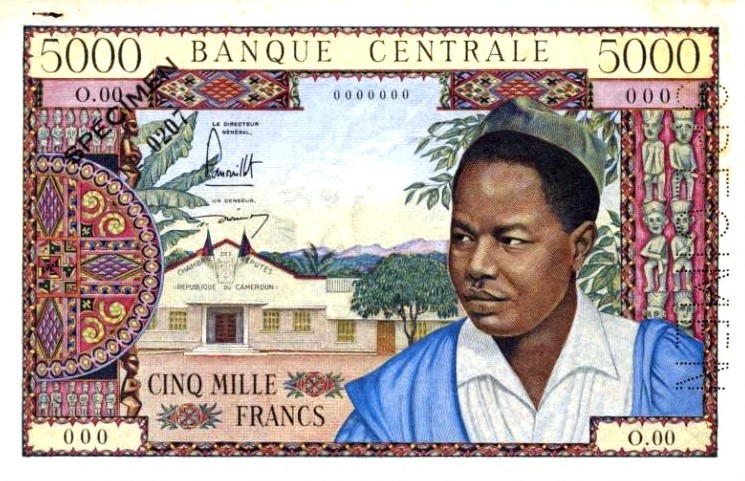
1961 specimen banknote of Cameroon from the Salem collection showing president Ahmadou Ahidjo.

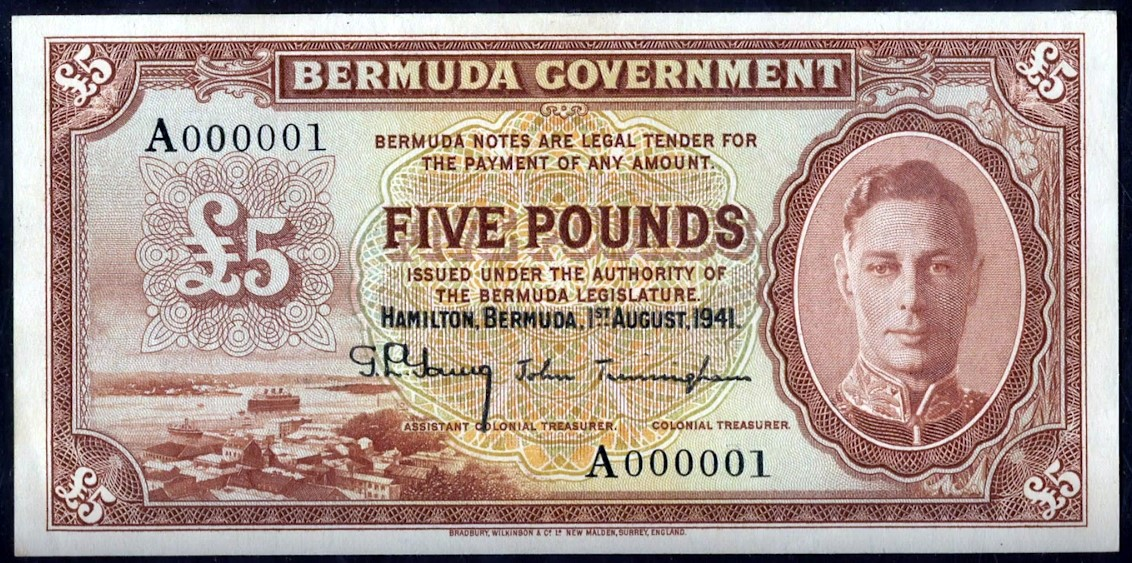
1941 £5 brown Bermuda banknote from the Salem collection, serial number A000001.

== Collecting ==
Over a period of more than 40 years, through extensive travel and by attending numerous auction sales, Salem assembled a collection of over 150,000 banknotes. He was assisted by the American dealer Mel Steinberg, who died in 2010. He has specialised in notes of the Middle East, particularly the monetary history of Iraq during the Hashemite dynasty, about which he is writing a history. In addition to banknotes, Salem collects coins, stock bonds, maps, driving licences, manuscripts, and passports.

Salem's interest in history has led him to write a book about the notable people who have appeared on banknotes, titled Banknotes of Destiny: Fame... Fortune... Fatality... and published in 2013. At the launch of the book, he told The Jordan Times that his collection included all of the Palestinian banknotes ever produced, and that "these banknotes are not for Ibrahim Salem, they are for the children of martyrs, and they are not to be sold no matter what. When I say martyrs, I do not only mean Palestinian martyrs, but all Arab countries."

His interest in the visual arts is reflected in the design and colour trials in his collection, such as a note for Cyprus featuring Makarios III that did not go into circulation. His collection also includes specimen and proof banknotes, some of which are very rare.

== Collection sales ==
Salem's collection is being sold in a series of auctions, the first of which in October 2013 featured his African banknotes, which he had assembled over 25 years. In the catalogue he observed that "the Dark Continent had some of the most colorful ones". His African material included a collection of notes associated with Patrice Lumumba, the first Prime Minister of the Democratic Republic of the Congo, who was known personally to Salem.

In October 2018 Salem's world collection was sold in a single sale, whilst his French, Spanish, and Portuguese notes were sold in a separate sale. His collection of South American banknotes was sold in January 2019, and included a counterfeit 20 peso note marked Banco Nacional de Cuba (F69) produced by the United States government for the failed Bay of Pigs Invasion in 1961.

The first part of Salem's British Commonwealth notes were sold in April 2019, and included a rare 1952 Bermuda £1 note with the serial number A000001, and a 1941 £5 brown Bermuda note, also with the serial number A000001, originally from the collection of the former Bermudian premier David Saul.

== Honours ==
Salem has been awarded the Al Hussein Medal of Merit, first class.

== Selected publications ==
=== Auction catalogues ===
- Africa. 4 October 2013.
- World Banknotes. 3 October 2018
- French, French Colonial, Spanish & Portuguese Banknotes. 3 October 2018. (see pdf above)
- South America and Other Properties. 11 January 2019.
- British Commonwealth Part 1. 17 April 2019.

=== Books ===
- Banknotes of Destiny: Fame... Fortune... Fatality... (2 vols.) Ibrahim Salem, Jordan, 2016. ISBN 9789957587048
