= Rasem Badran =

Saudi Arabian architect

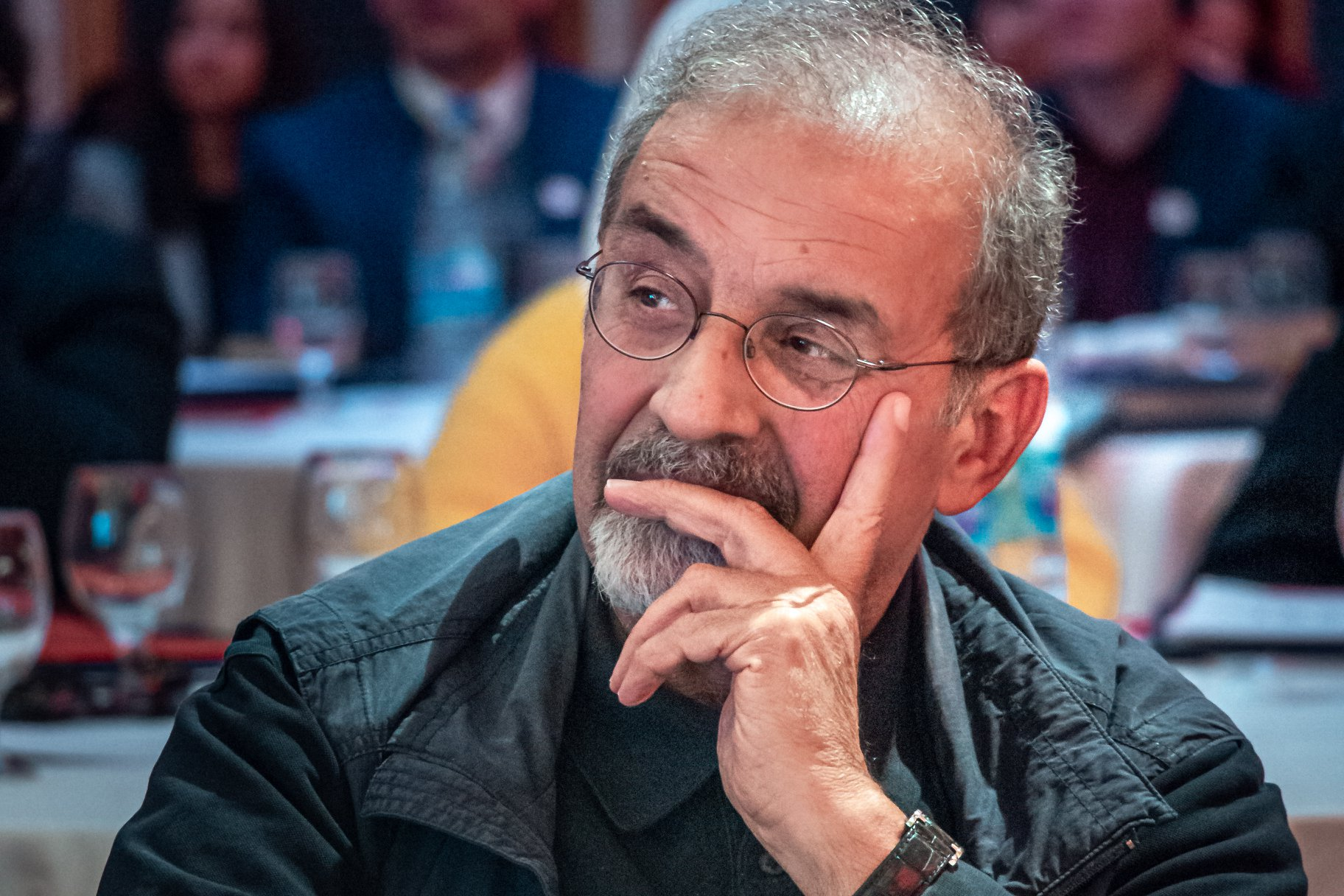
- Born: 1945 (age 80–81); Palestine
- Alma mater: Technische Universität Darmstadt
- Occupation: Architect
- Awards: Aghakhan award for architecture
- Buildings: Qasr Al Hukm, Grand Mosque in Riyadh, Abu Dhabi Courts complex

Rasem Jamal Badran (Arabic: راسم بدران; born 1945 in Palestine) is a Saudi Arabian/Jordanian architect of Palestinian descent whose works are based on a methodological approach in defining Architecture as a continuous dialogue between contemporary needs and historical inherited cultural values.

== Education ==
Rasem Badran received his early education in Ramallah. In 1970 Badran graduated with a degree in architecture from Technische Universität Darmstadt (Darmstadt University of Technology) in former West Germany.

== Positions and roles ==
- Co-founder of Dar Al Omran Rasem Badran company (1979)
- Badran is a permanent member in the Academic Council for the international Academy of Architecture (I.A.A) in Sophia
- Member of the Greater Amman Municipality (2007)
- Design advisory board member in Moutamarat – International Design Initiative (2007)
- Member of the Dubai Municipality "Dubai International Awards for Best Practices" (2006)
- Member of the International Jury of the ARCASIA Award for Architecture which was held in Dhaka – Bangladesh (2003)
- Member of the International Master Jury of the Aga Khan Award for Architecture (1998)
- Member of the International Jury of the Governor-General's award for architecture, Kingston, Jamaica (1992)
- Member of the Master Jury committee for the Arab Towns Organization prizes (1985)
- Member of International Jury for planning and urban development in the old area of "Bab-al Sheikh" in Baghdad – Iraq (1981)
- Chair of the Jury member for the 4th Abdullatif Al Fozan Award for Mosque Architecture

== Selected projects ==
- Justice Palace in Riyadh
- Great Mosque of Riyadh and the Old City Center Redevelopment
- Movenpick Petra Hotel
- King Abdul Aziz Historical Centre
- King Abdul Aziz Foundation for Research and Archives
- Abu Dhabi Courts Complex
- Al Bujairi quarter
- Ministry of Culture Saudi Arabia
- Quba Mosque expansion project
- Budour Al Najaf in Iraq

== Awards and honours ==
- international Academy of Architecture (I.A.A) Career Prize 2025.
- In 2022 he gained the Saudi Nationality as an honoring for his achievements in the architecture in Saudi Arabia
- The Aga Khan Award for Architecture, received for the design of the Grand Mosque of Riyadh and redevelopment of Riyadh Old City Center (1995)
- 2022 Turgut Cansever Prize, The Turgut Cansever Grand Prix was awarded to Dr. Rasem J. Badran for his lifelong commitment to a contextual approach to the contemporary built environment prioritises local and regional identity as well as environmental sensibilities.
- Honorary Ph.D. in Architectural Design from the Jordan University of Science and Technology for his advancement in Architectural Theory and Practice
- Palestine Award for Architecture
- First Arab Architect Award which was announced by the Arab Housing Ministers of the Arab League in Cairo – Egypt (1997)
- Arab Architecture Award received in Morocco at the general conference of the Arab Towns Organization (1990)
- Winner of the Museum of Islamic Art international competition in Doha-Qatar which was sponsored by Aga Khan – Geneva Office in cooperation with the government of Qatar
- Winner of Sidon Seafront development Competition in Lebanon
- Won the first prize (Elementa 72) in the international competition for the design of limited income housing sponsored by the Ministry of Housing in Bonn, West Germany
- "Al Hussein Medal for Distinguished Performance of the First Order" For his great distinguished efforts in the enrichment of modern Islamic architecture
- "TAMAYOUZ LIFETIME ACHIEVEMENT AWARD FOR ARCHITECTURE" The Lifetime Achievement Award celebrates the achievements of individuals who have made significant contributions toward humanity and the advancement of architecture and the built environment in the Near East and North Africa. The award also recognizes those whose commitments to architecture were and continue to be unparalleled. The award was established as part of the Tamayouz Excellence Award program, which champions and celebrates the best architecture worldwide.

== Publications ==
- Steele, James (2005). The Architecture of Rasem Badran. London: Thames & Hudson. ISBN 0-500-34206-7.
