= Talhouni =

Talhouni is a surname found in Jordan.

Notable people with the surname include:

- Bahjat Talhouni (1913–1994), Jordanian politician and Prime Minister
- Bassam Talhouni (born 1964), Jordanian politician and lawyer
- Khaldoun Talhouni, Jordanian diplomat
- Nabil Talhouni, Jordanian diplomat
