= Orders, decorations, and medals of Estonia =

The orders, decorations, and medals of Estonia mainly refer to the Estonian state decorations or Estonian national decorations are six awards given by the President of Estonia. The majority are given in honour of the nation's independence, celebrated on 24 February, as well as on state visits.

The awards recognise acts of defense, public service, culture, and those that are humanitarian in nature. These decorations are governed by the State Decorations Act. The six Estonian state decorations are the Order of the National Coat of Arms, Order of the White Star, Order of the Cross of the Eagle, Order of the Estonian Red Cross, Order of the Cross of Terra Mariana, Cross of Liberty.

== Background ==
State orders, the highest recognition in Estonia, honour exceptional service. An example is the Order of the National Coat of Arms, established in 1936, which is awarded to high-ranking Estonian officials. State orders have included military decorations, like the Cross of Liberty, which was awarded to those who defended Estonia during times of war.

Estonia's system for state decorations was created after World War I. The state decorations were first established in 1919. Additional state decorations were codified in 1936 and created up until 1937. The first Estonian state decoration that was established after the Estonian War of Independence was the Cross of Liberty. It was given on 24 February 1919. The Cross of Terra Mariana was introduced by President Lennart Meri.

The awards were reinstated when Estonia regained independence in 1991, after Soviet occupation. Awards recognise significant community or national contributions.

Estonian state decorations have been manufactured by various companies, including OÜ Roman Tavast and OÜ Miniplast Pluss. The companies will at times be tasked with completing different parts of the awards.

== Types ==
Each of the awards holds different significance. The Cross of Liberty was a military decoration awarded for military bravery. The Order of the National Coat of Arms is the highest civilian honour for Estonian citizens. The Order of the Cross of Terra Mariana honours foreign contributors to Estonia's interests.The Order of the White Star recognises civil and societal services and the Order of the Cross of the Eagle is awarded for national defence contributions. Finally, the Order of the Estonian Red Cross typically honours those in healthcare or who have saved lives.

=== Display ===
A display of Estonian State Decorations is located on the 5th floor of the Tõnismäe building of the National Library of Estonia. It was completed in 2008 for the 90th anniversary of the Republic of Estonia and was established in cooperation with the State Chancellery. It underwent renovations with a planned reopening in 2027. The gallery's sample collection of state decorations includes the Cross of Liberty, which is no longer bestowed. It however does not include the special class for the Order of the National Coat of Arms.

The branch that currently oversees the collection of Estonian state decorations is the Office of the President of Estonia. Since 2008, the Office of the President has been officially in charge of handling the state awards.The President of the Republic is tasked with bestowing awards.

=== Protocol ===
Decorations are laid out in the 2007 State Decorations Act (Note: In Estonian it is called Teenetemärkide seadus, abbreviated as TeenMS, and was passed by the Riigikogu.) Pre-war decorations, though not necessarily all of their classes, were restored through the Decorations Act and its amending acts. The most recent version of the act was passed as an Estonian law on 19 December 2007.

Some awards have been given posthumously. The awards can be given to citizens and foreigners depending on the type of award.Decorations are worn in a specific order during special events, such as national holidays and state visits. Decorations can be revoked for criminal convictions or dishonourable conduct.The Estonian State Decorations Act allows for the withdrawal of state decorations upon a final court conviction for intentional criminal offences.

Cross of Liberty	Order of the National Coat of Arms	Order of the Cross of Terra Mariana
EST Cross of Liberty 1st grade 3rd class		
Order of the White Star	Order of the Cross of the Eagle	Order of the Estonian Red Cross

Orders have multiple classes, with collars and stars for senior ranks and medals for lower distinctions. Designs include national symbols on coloured ribbons, categorised as state orders or military distinctions. The class structure of the state decorations varies for each award. The Cross of Liberty, awarded for military, gallant, and civilian service, has three degrees numbered I to III, with the 1st degree of the II class not yet awarded. The Order of the National Coat of Arms, a collar used as the president's badge of office, has five classes numbered I to V, but medals do not exist in the restored Republic of Estonia. The Order of the White Star, also a collar with five classes numbered I to V and one medal class, and the Order of the Cross of the Eagle, with three medal classes, lack a collar. The Order of the Estonian Red Cross, with a collar, five classes numbered I to V, and one medal class, and the Order of the Cross of Terra Mariana, with a collar, five classes numbered I to V, also lack medals.

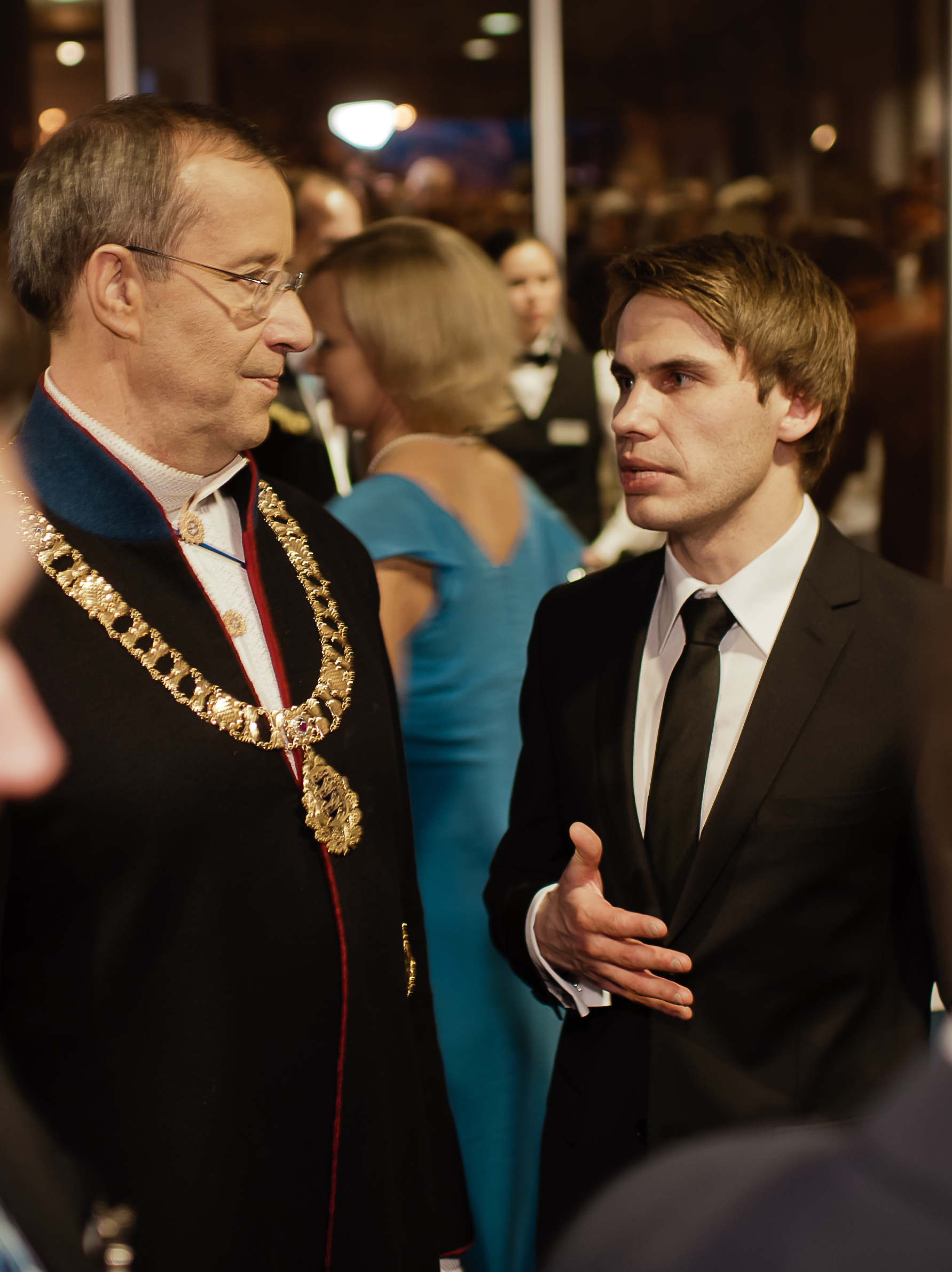
Toomas Hendrik Ilves speaking to Rannar Vassiljev while wearing the Order of the National Coat of Arms

== Cross of Liberty ==
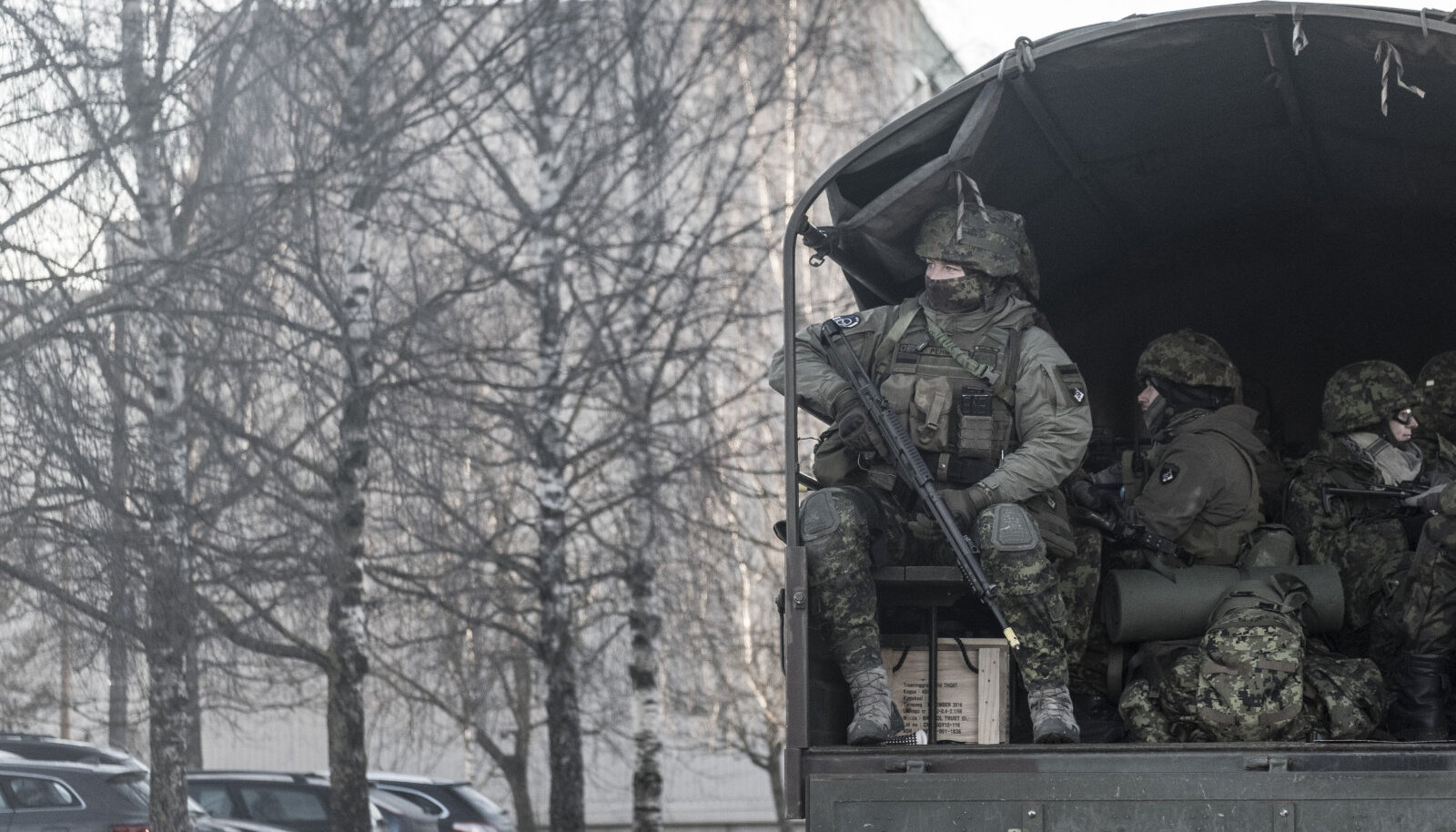
Members of the Estonian Defense League from the Tallinn malev at the back of a transport truck during an exercise.

=== Insignia ===
Ribbon	Name
	Cross of Liberty (for military service)
	Cross of Liberty (for gallantry in action)
	Cross of Liberty (for civilian service)

== Order of the National Coat of Arms ==
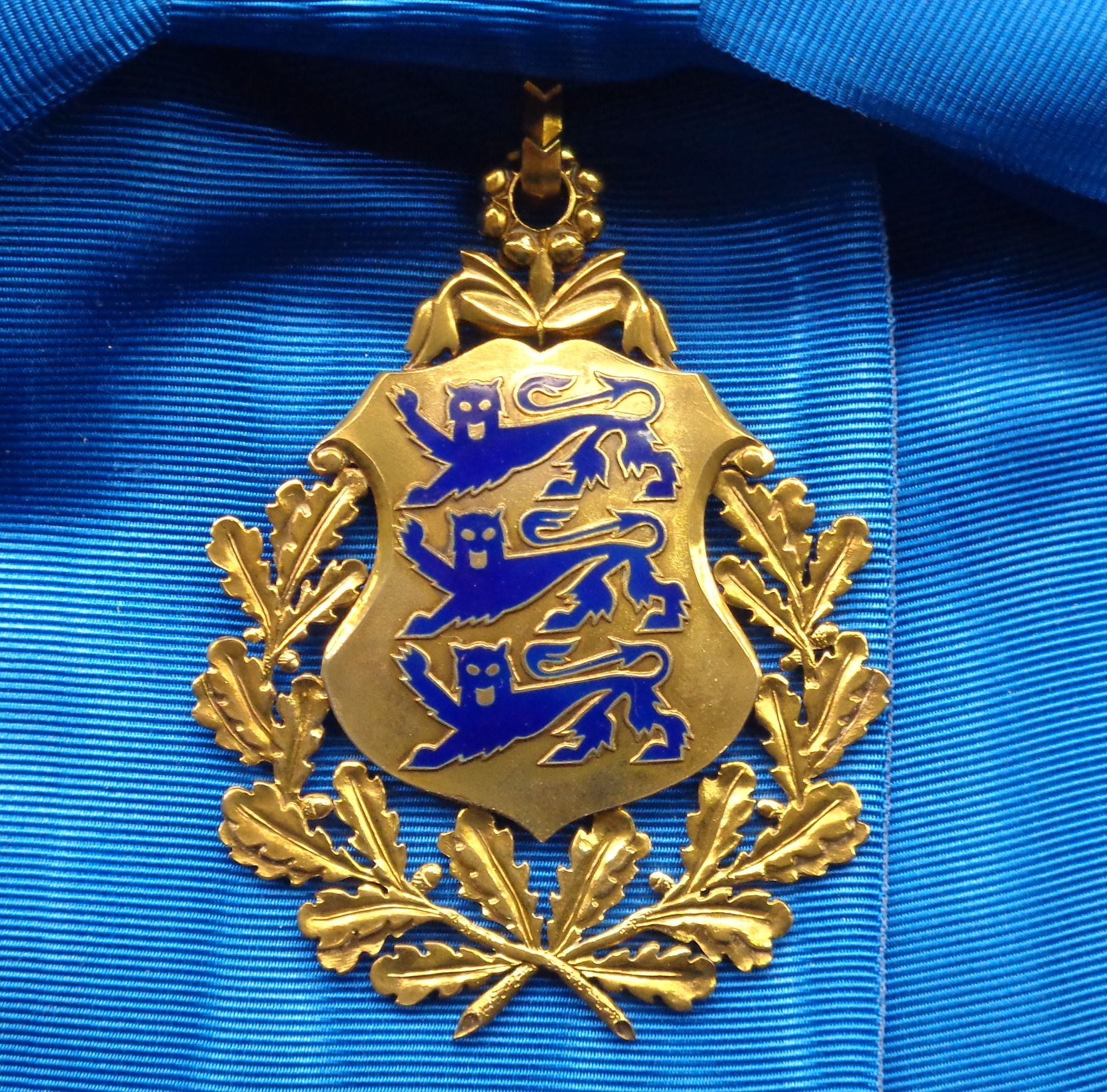
1st Class Badge

The Order of the National Coat of Arms is Estonia's highest state decoration for citizens, recognising long-term civil service. The current collar of the Order of the National Coat of Arms is a copy of the original, which, for unknown reasons, is located in the Armoury of the Moscow Kremlin and has not yet been returned to the Estonian state.

=== Insignia ===
Ribbon	Name
	Order of the National Coat of Arms, 1st Class
	Order of the National Coat of Arms, 2nd Class
	Order of the National Coat of Arms, 3rd Class
	Order of the National Coat of Arms, 4th Class
	Order of the National Coat of Arms, 5th Class
	Order of the National Coat of Arms, Collar

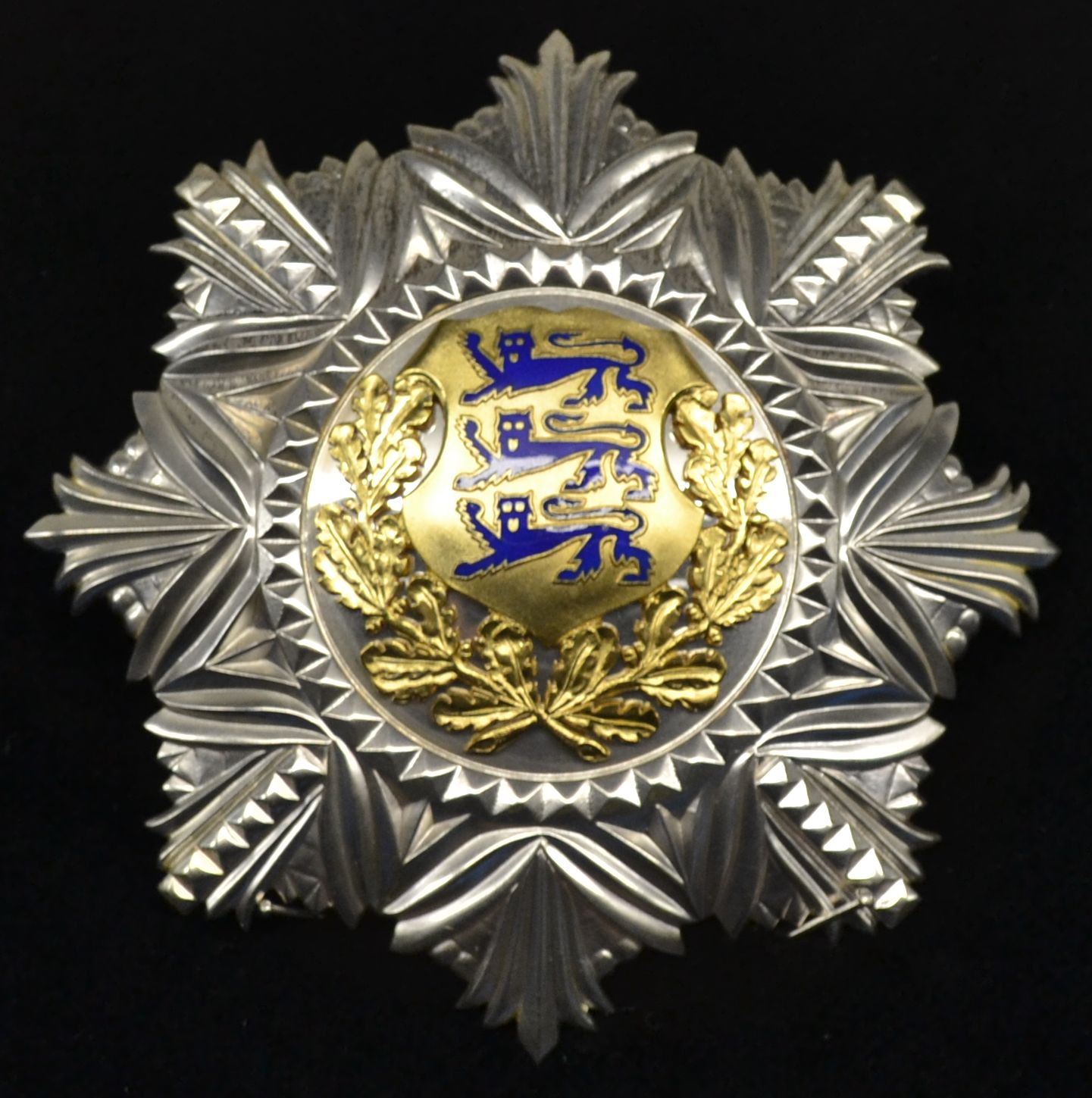
First Class Star

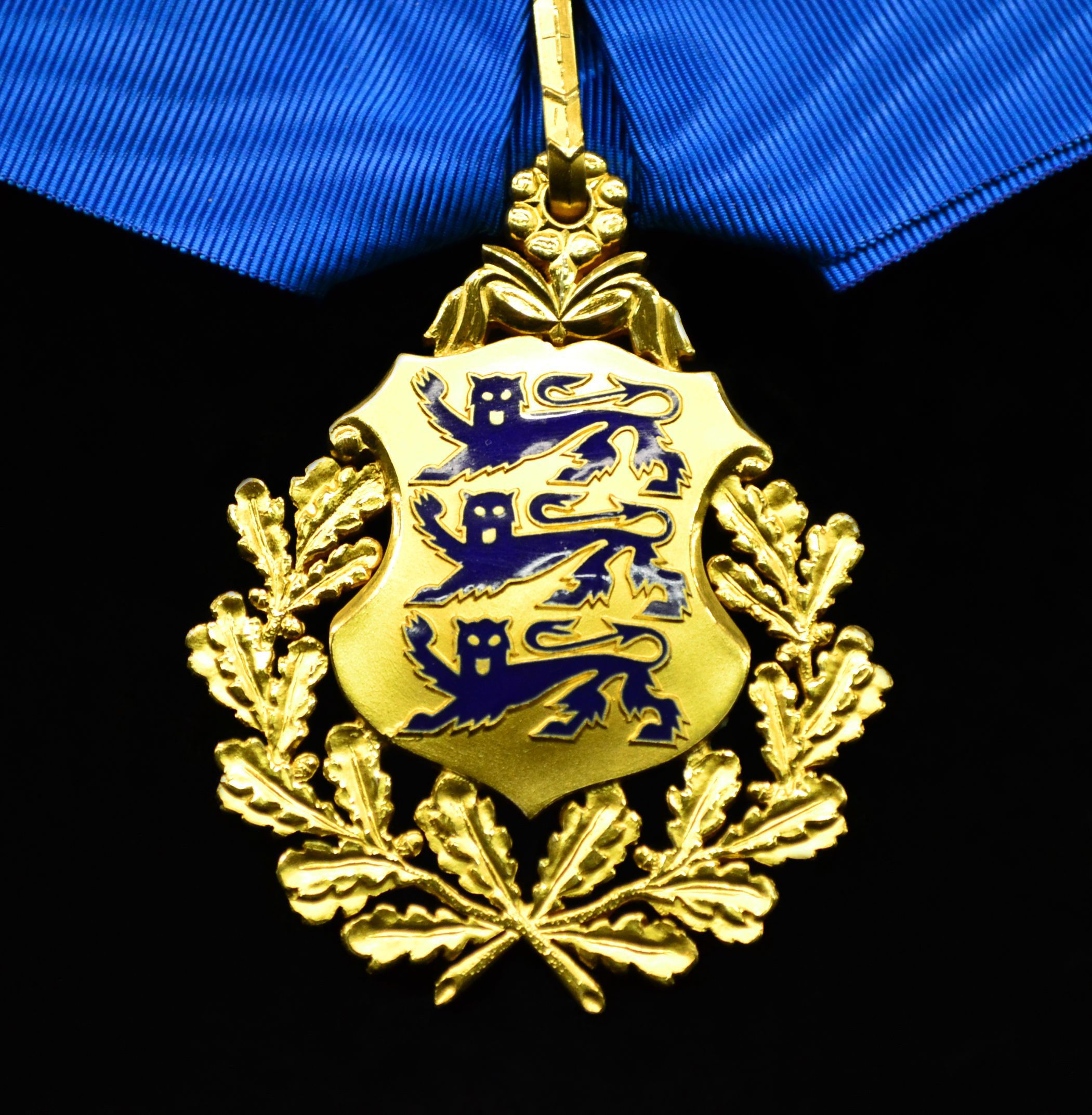
Second Class Badge

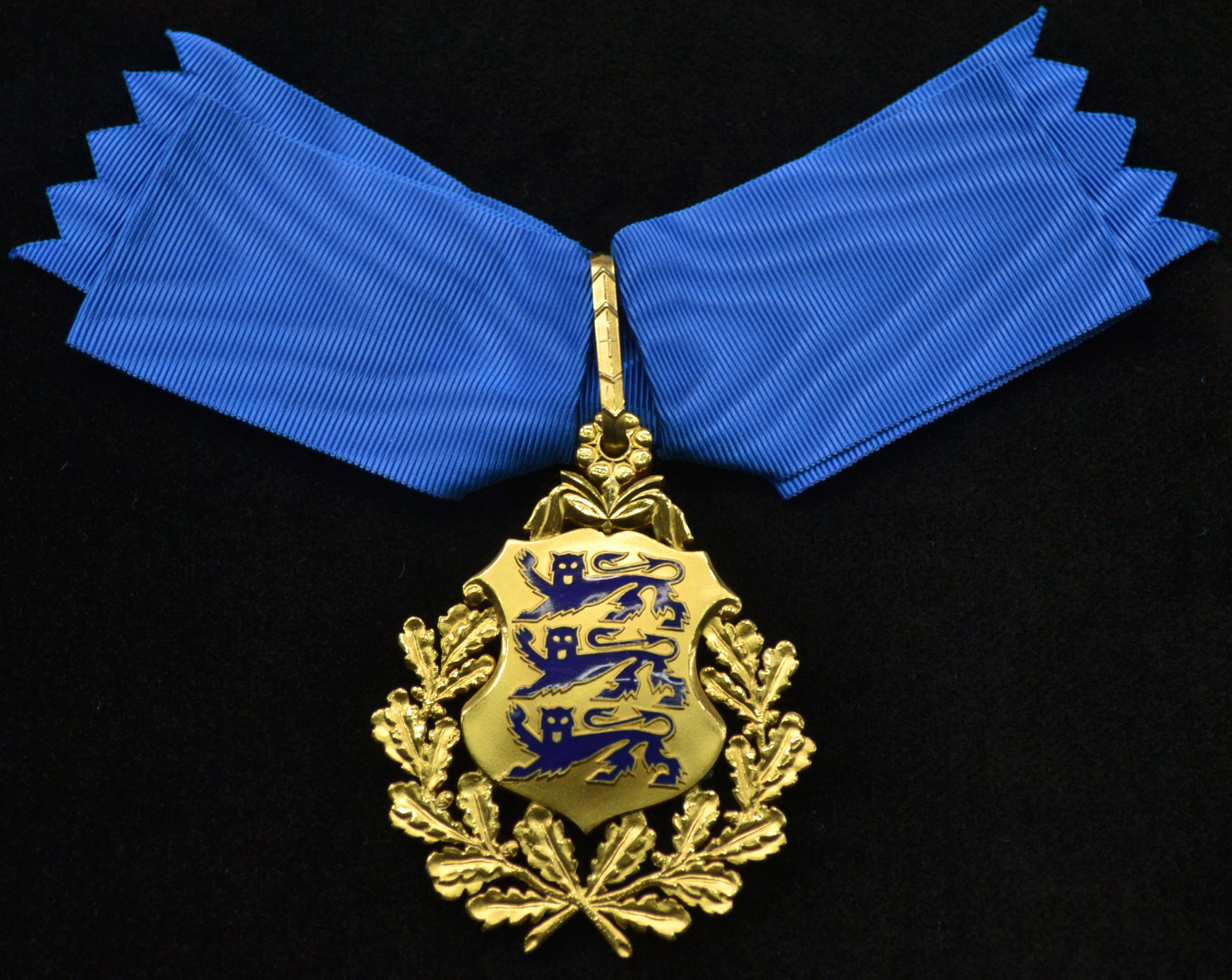
Third Class Badge

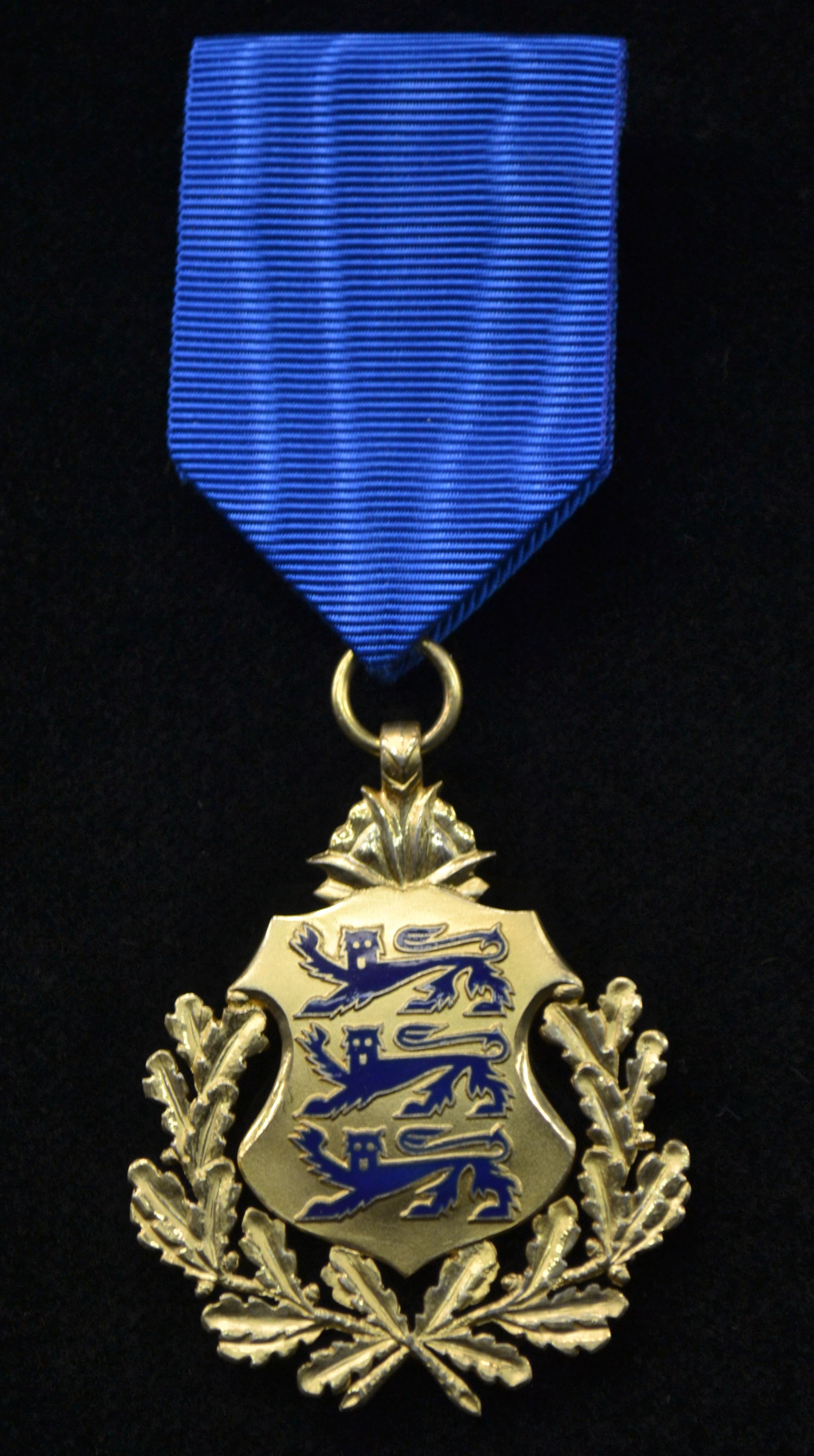
Fifth Class Badge

=== Selected awardees ===
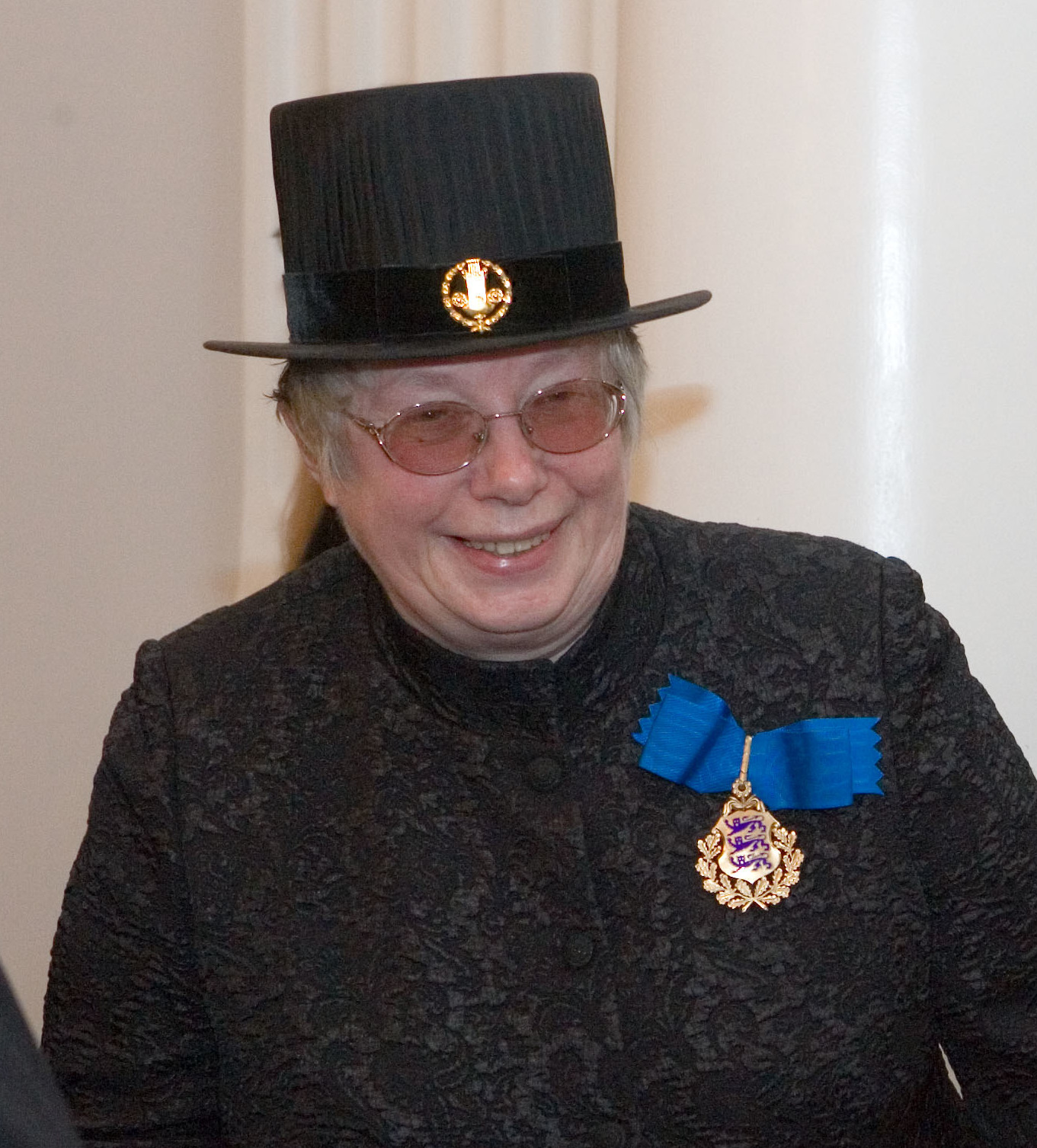
Marju Lauristin, politician and academic

== Order of the Cross of Terra Mariana ==
The Order of the Cross of Terra Mariana, Estonia's highest state decoration for foreign nationals, has six classes and honours. It was established in 1994 by President Lennart Meri to foreigners who had contributed to Estonia's independence.

=== Insignia ===
Order of the Cross of Terra Mariana Insignia
1st Class	3rd Class	4th Class	5th Class	Collar
1st class badge 1st class star	3rd class badge 3rd class badge	4th class badge	5th class badge	Collar badge star Collar badge Collar

Ribbon	Name
	Order of the Cross of Terra Mariana, 1st Class
	Order of the Cross of Terra Mariana, 2nd Class
	Order of the Cross of Terra Mariana, 3rd Class
	Order of the Cross of Terra Mariana, 4th Class
	Order of the Cross of Terra Mariana, 5th Class

== Order of the White Star ==
=== Insignia ===
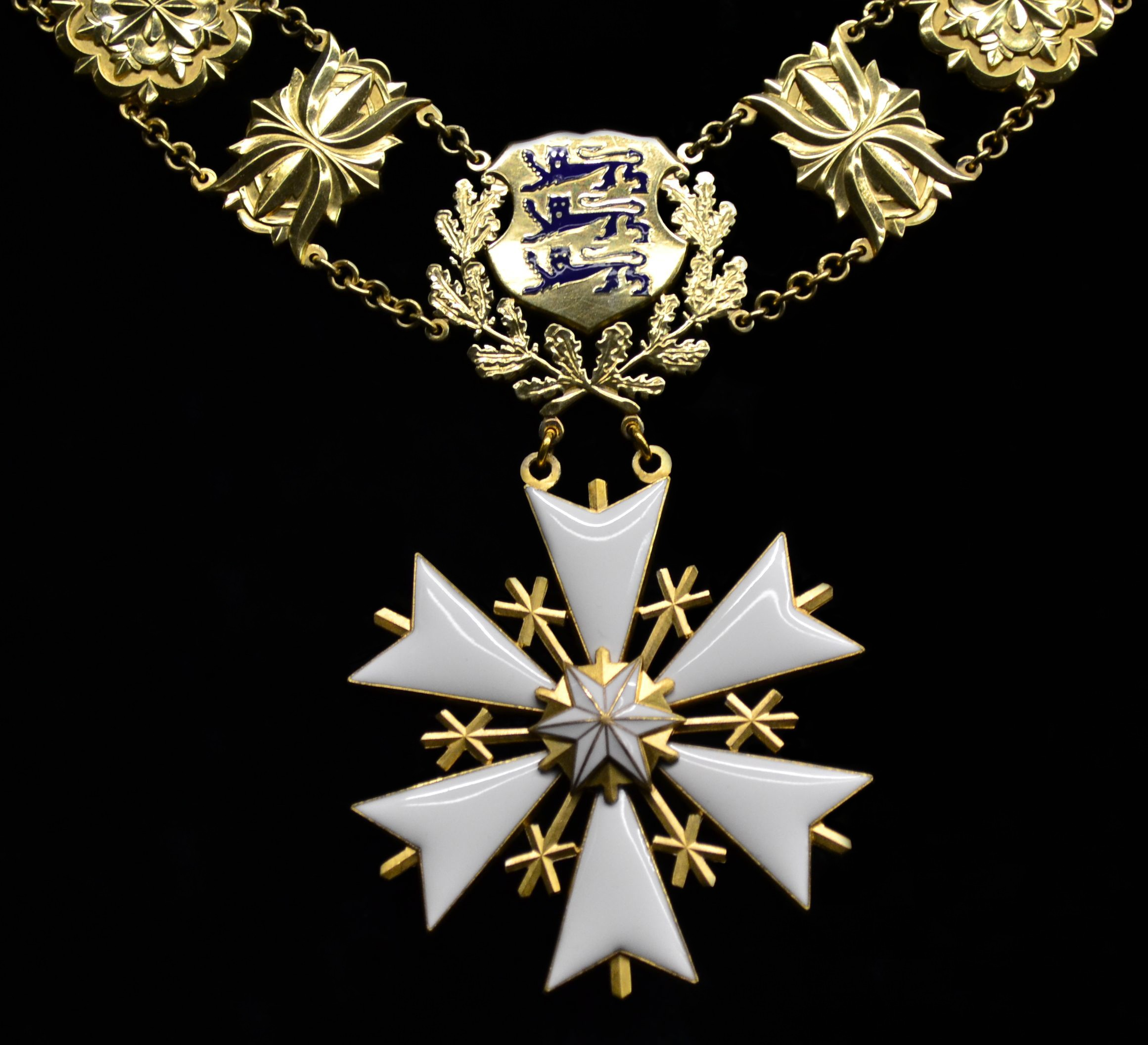
Collar Class Badge

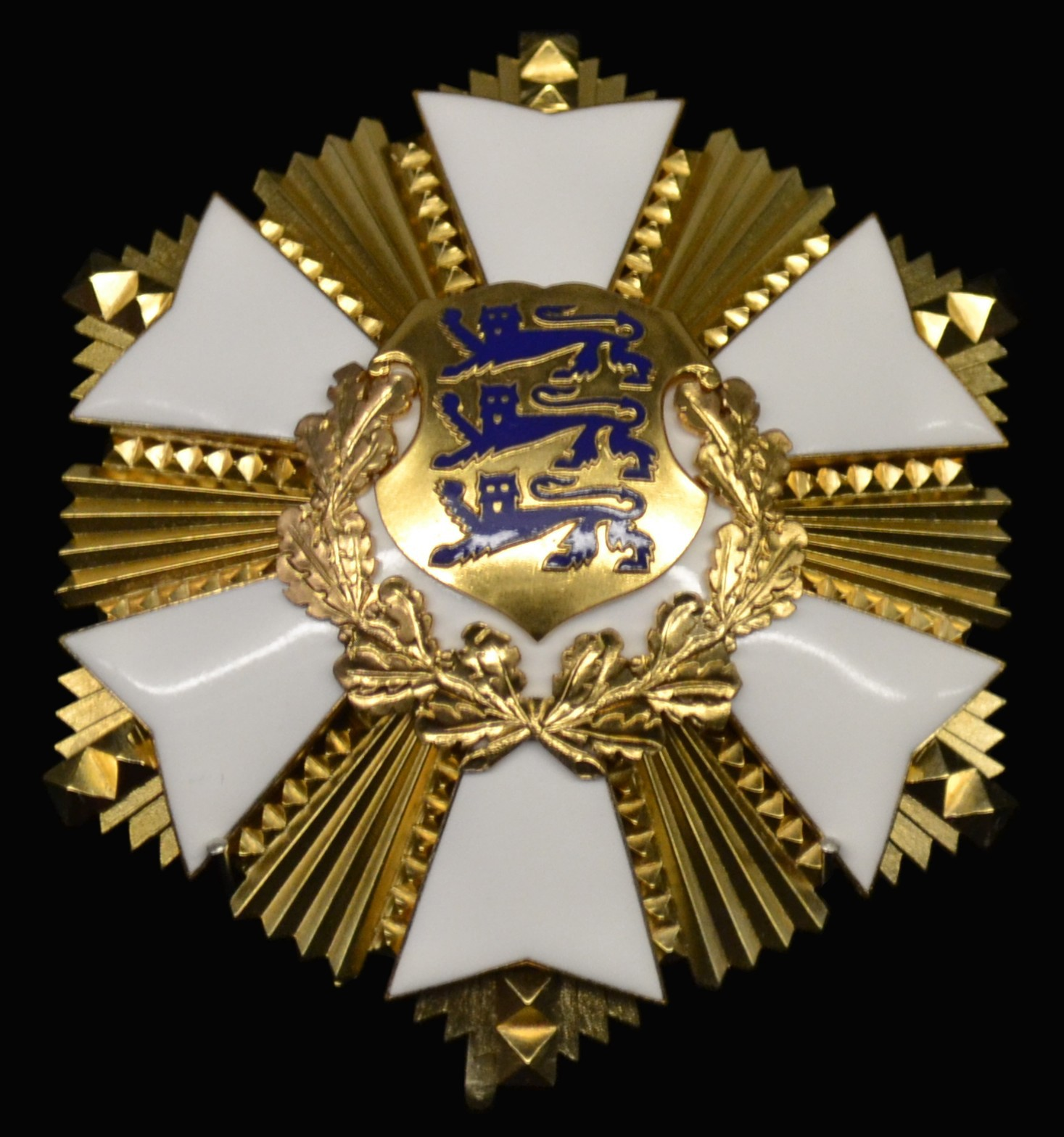
Collar Class Star

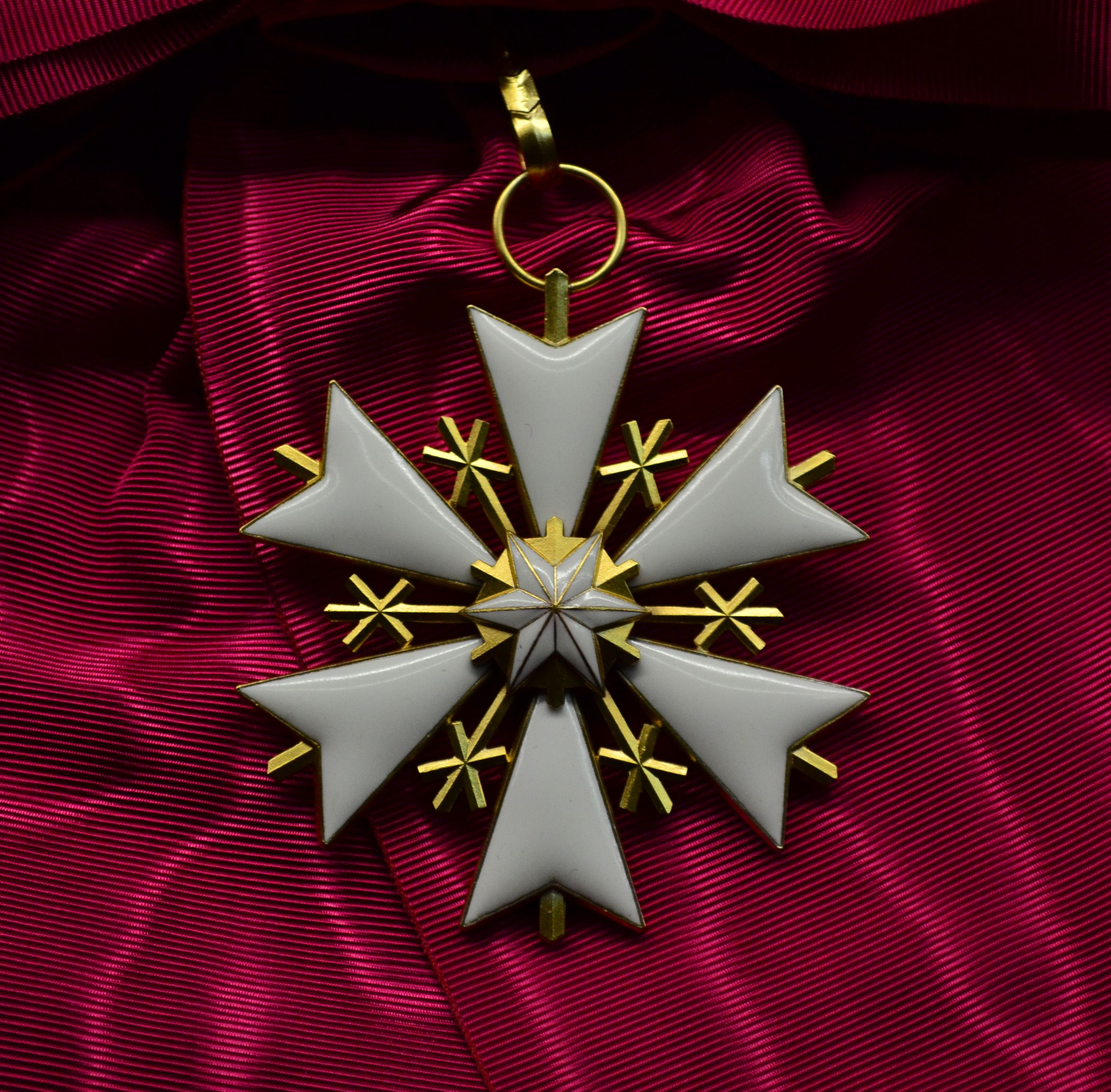
First Class Badge

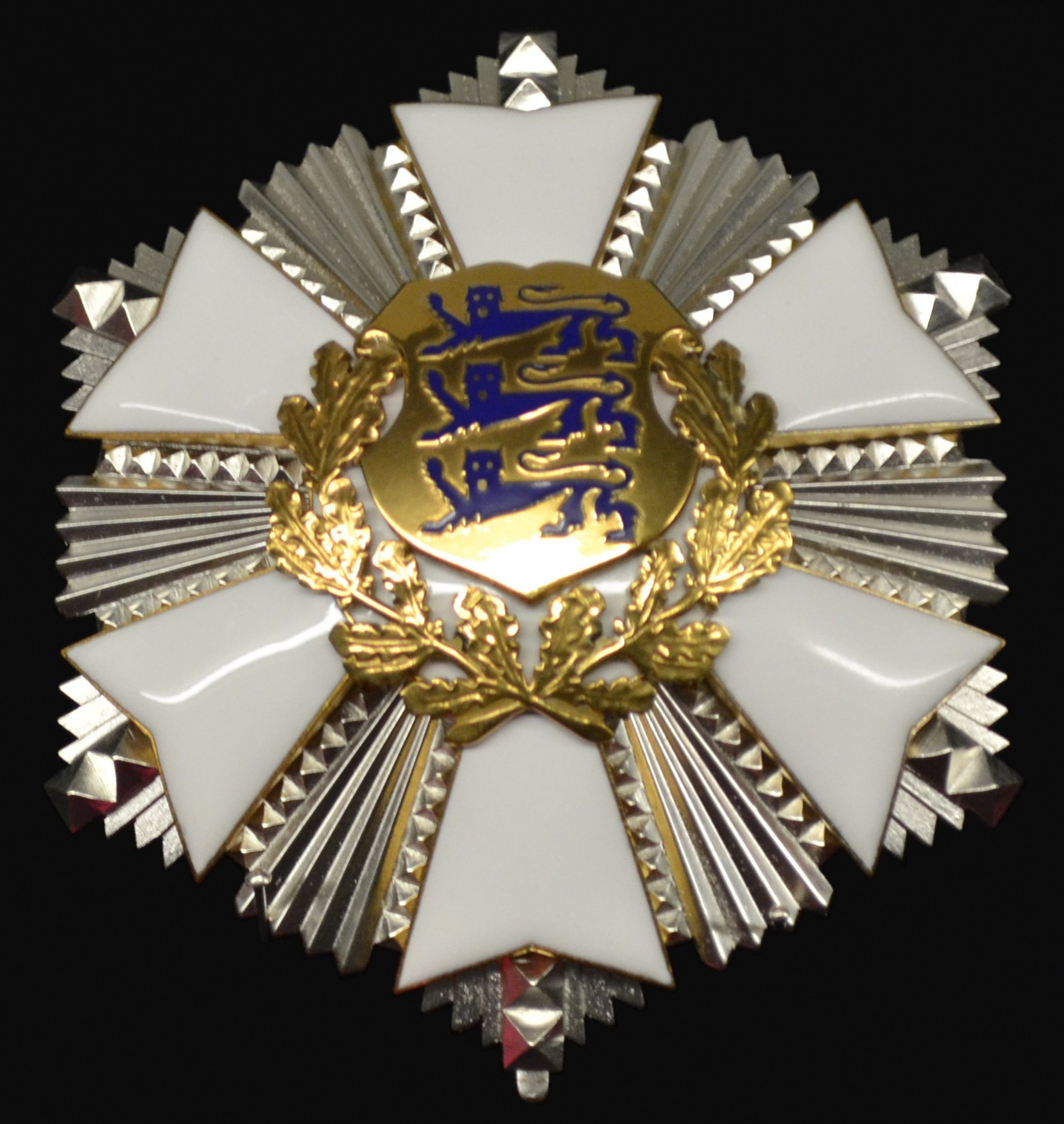
First Class Star

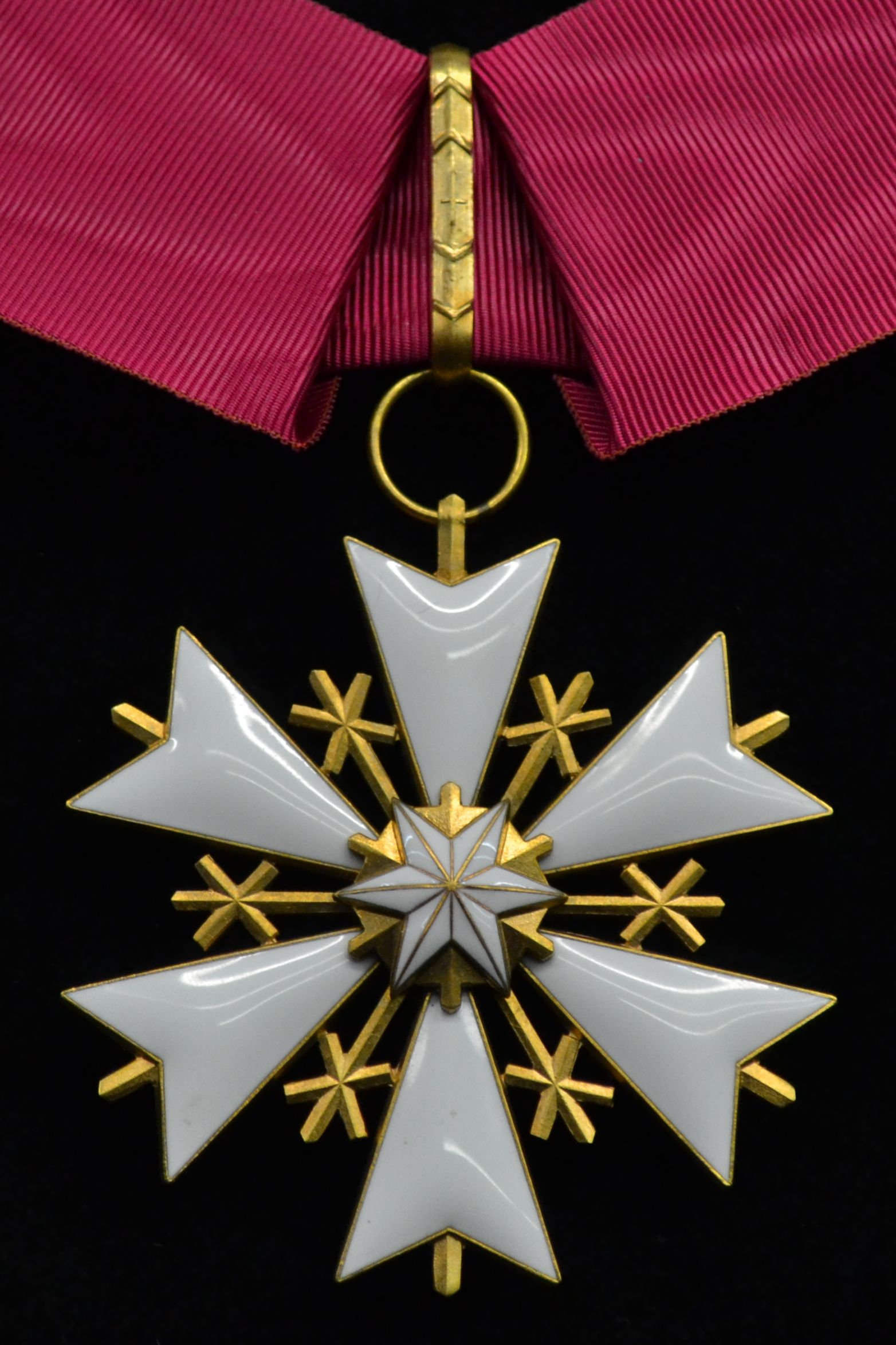
Third Class Badge

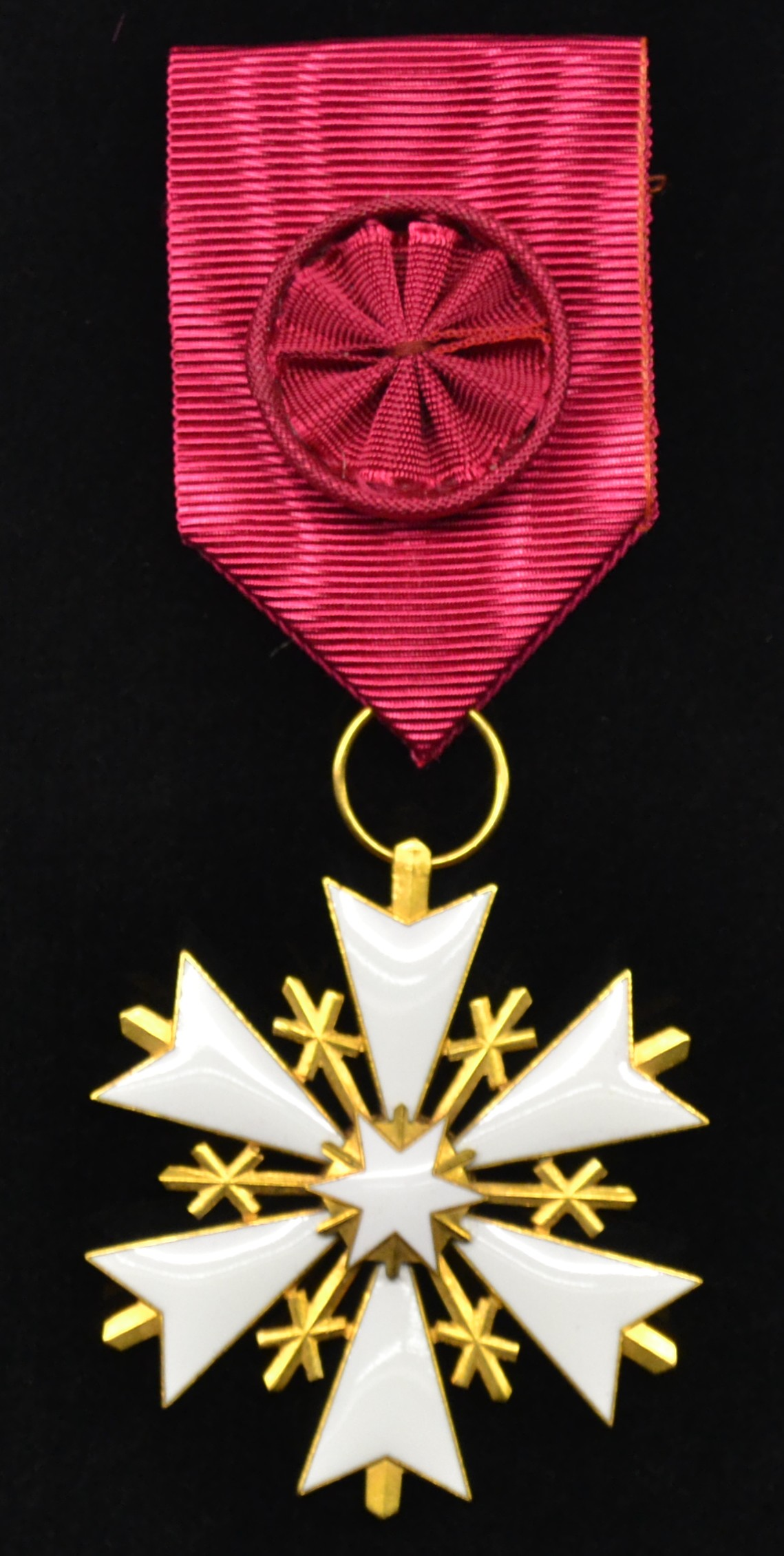
Fourth Class Badge

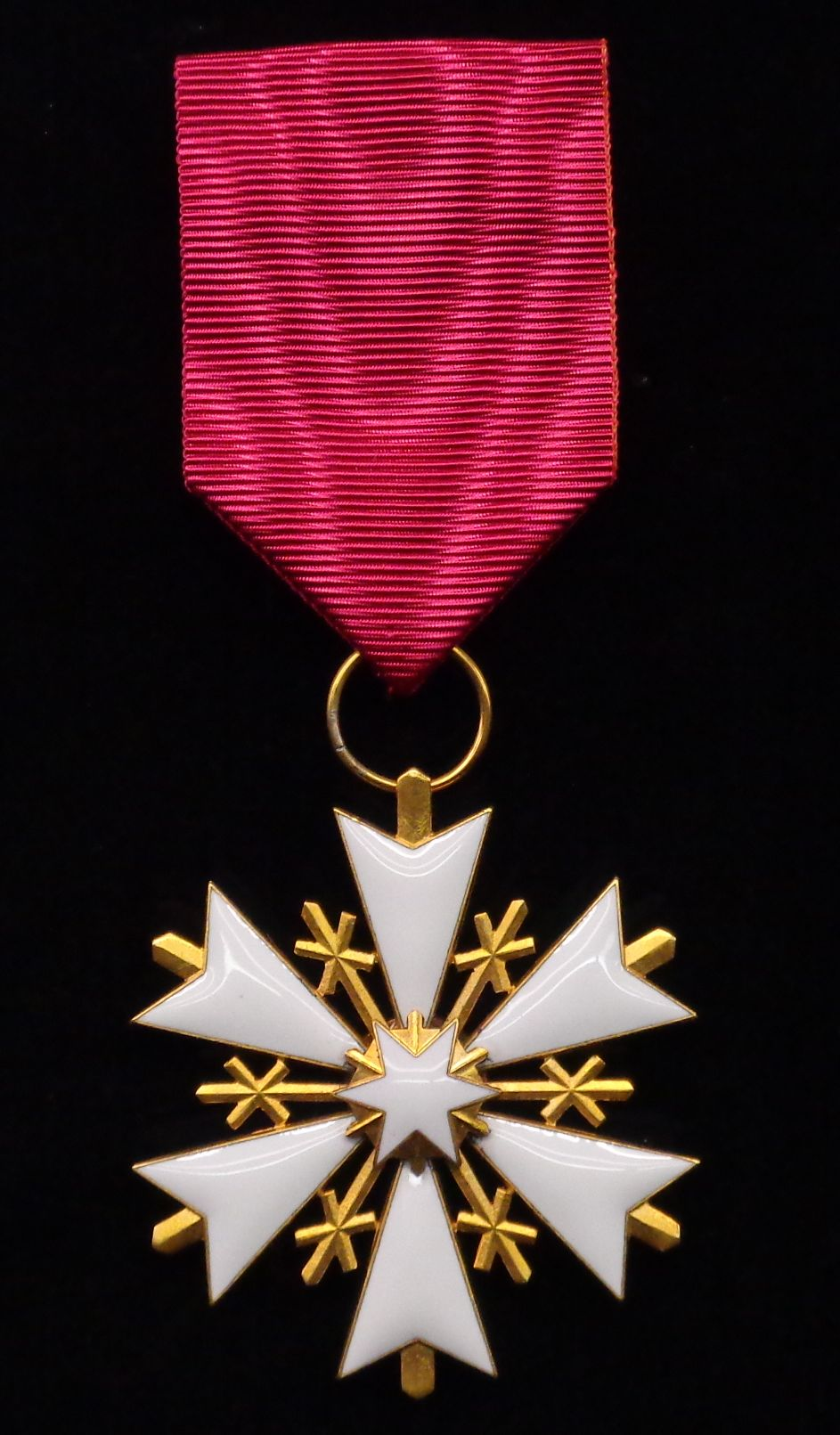
Fifth Class Badge

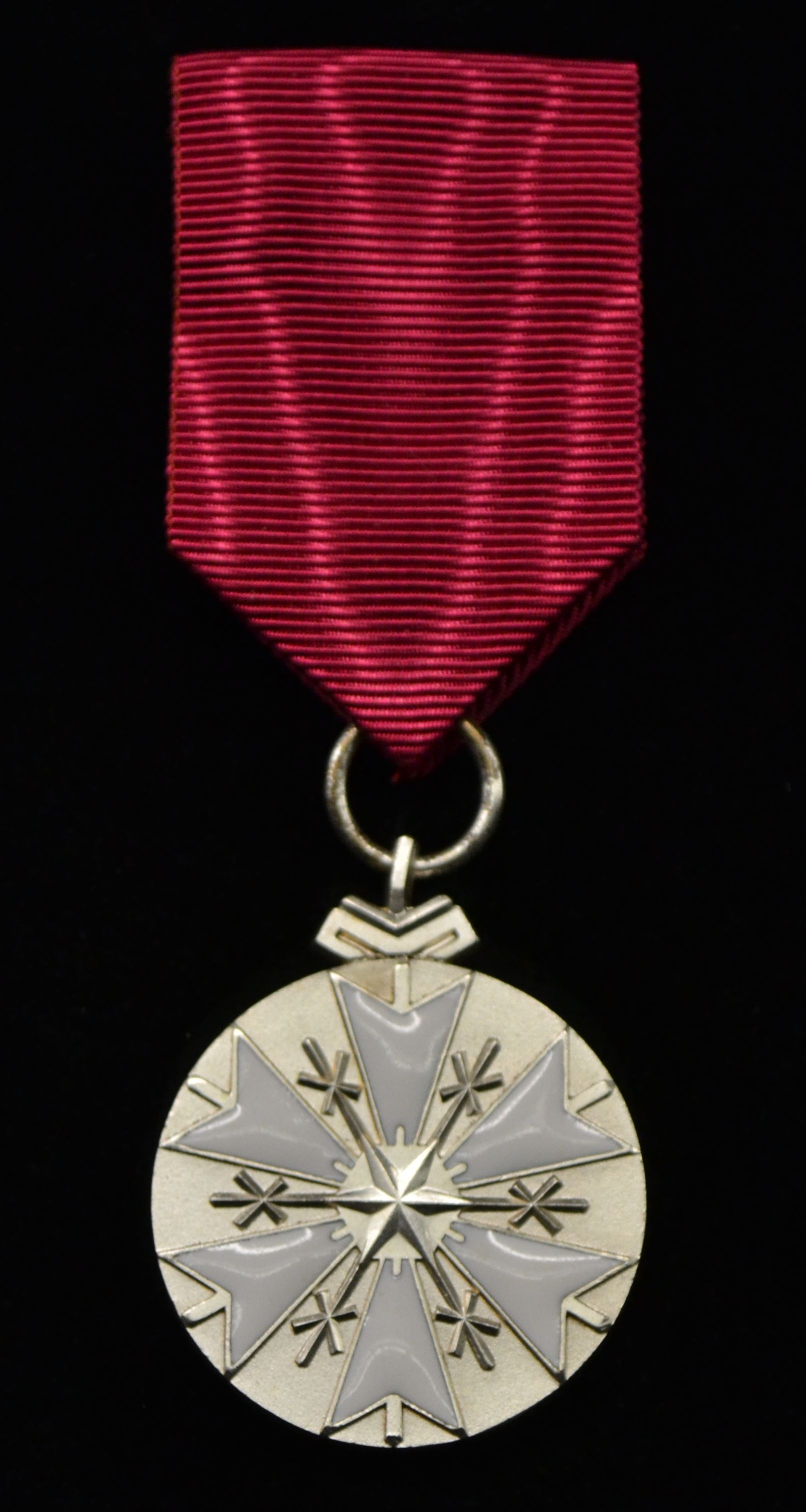
Medal Class

Ribbon	Name
	Order of the White Star, 1st Class
	Order of the White Star, 2nd Class
	Order of the White Star, 3rd Class
	Order of the White Star, 4th Class
	Order of the White Star, 5th Class

=== Selected awardees ===
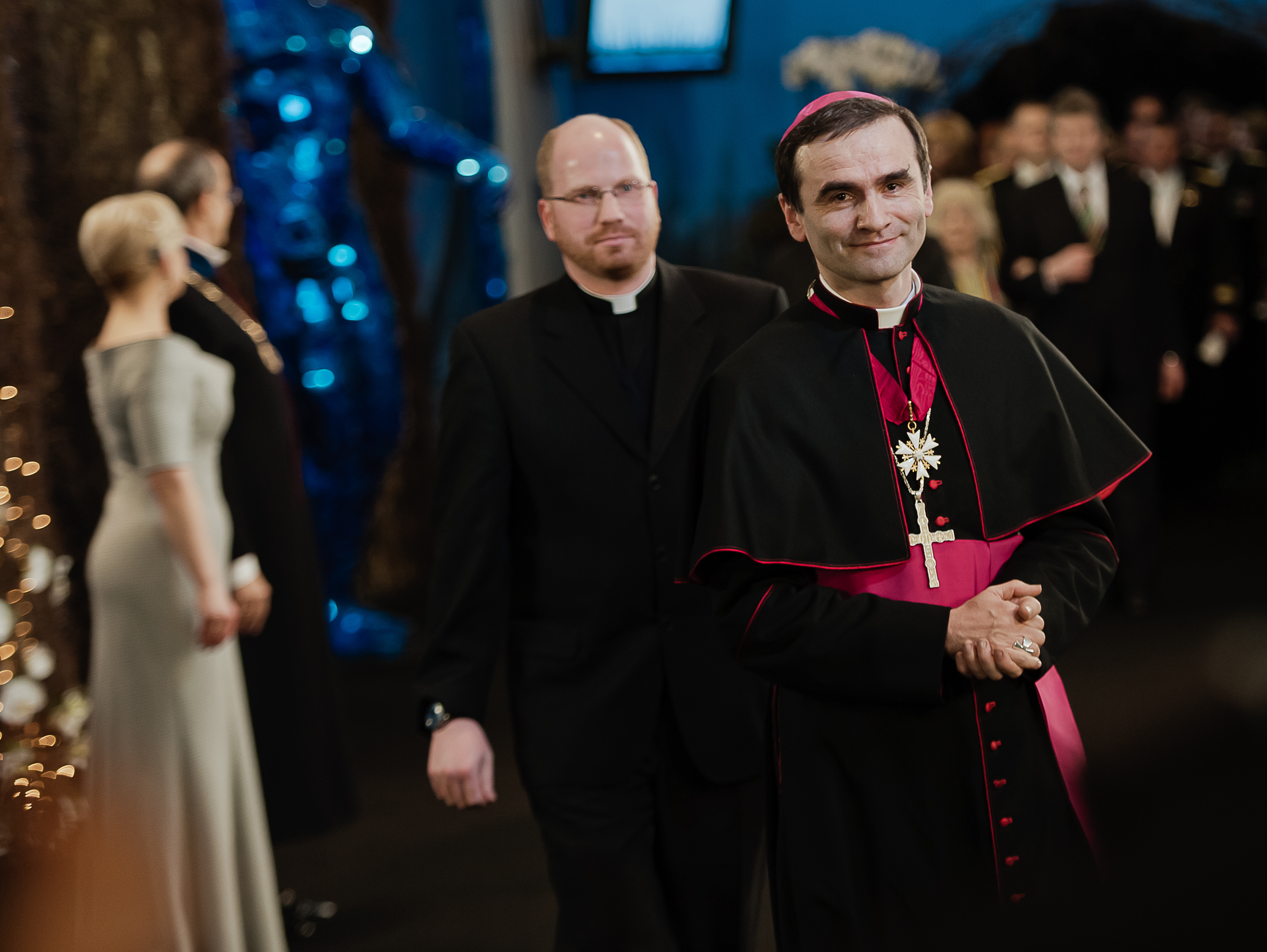
Philippe Jourdan, Bishop of Estonia

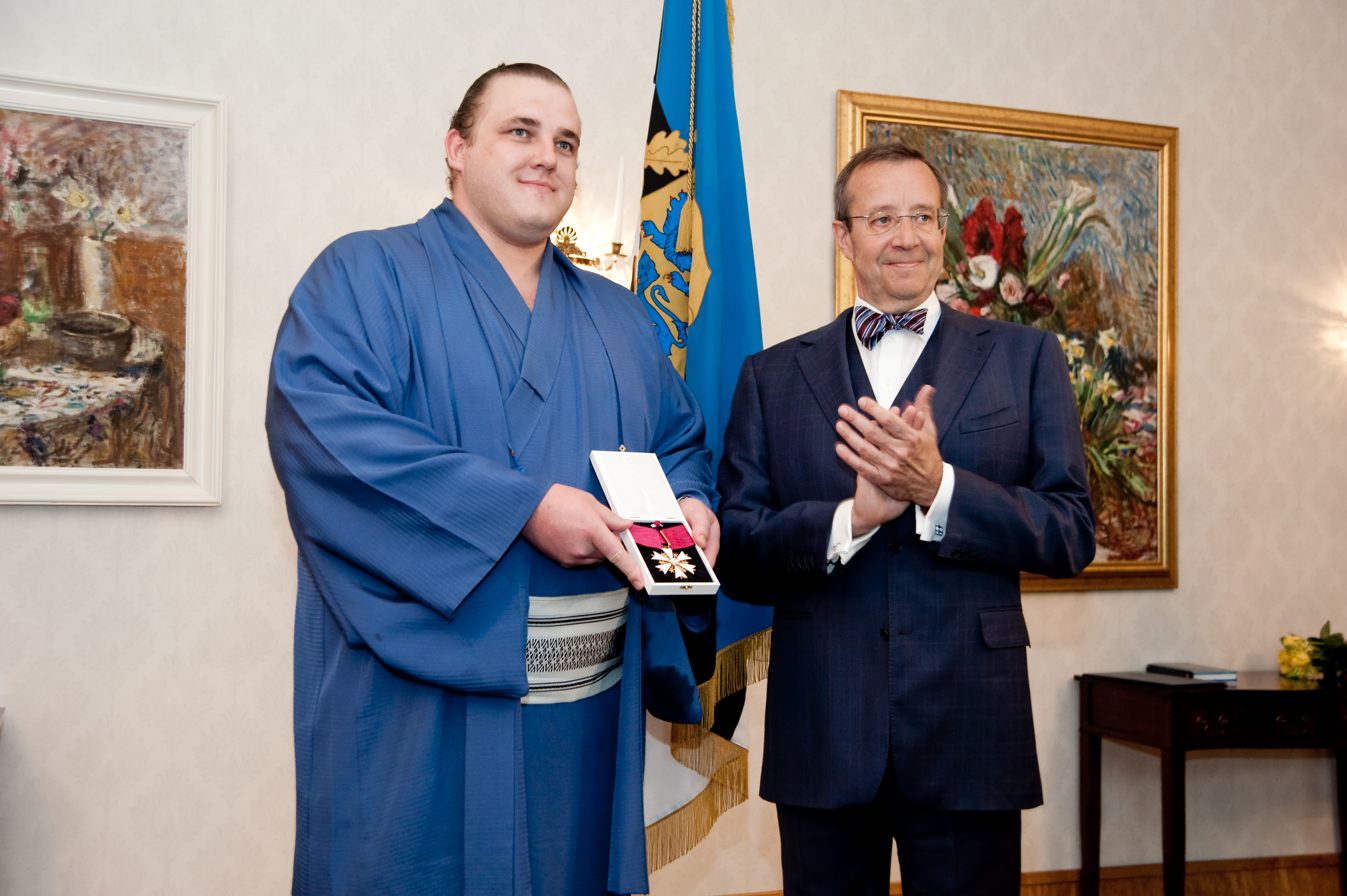
Baruto Kaito, sumo wrestler and politician

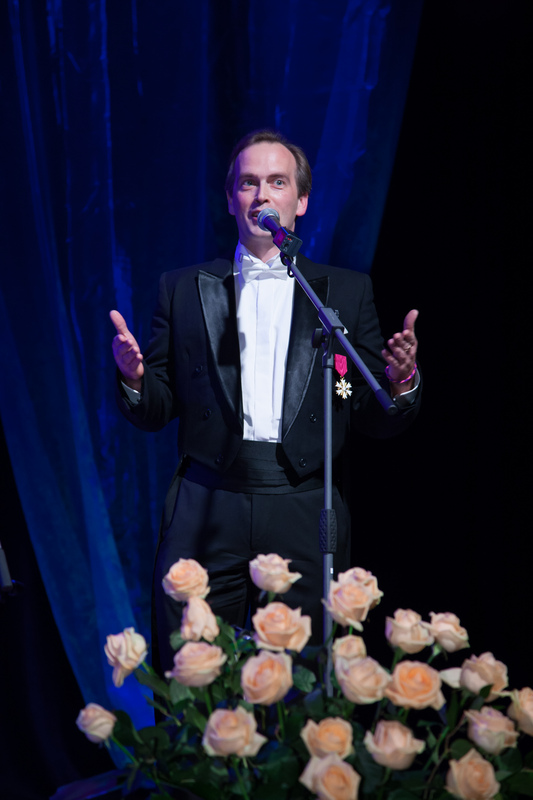
Mart Noorma, scientist and academic

== Order of the Cross of the Eagle ==
The Order of the Cross of the Eagle, established in 1928 by the Estonian National Defence League, honours national independence and recognises achievements in national defence operations.

=== Insignia ===
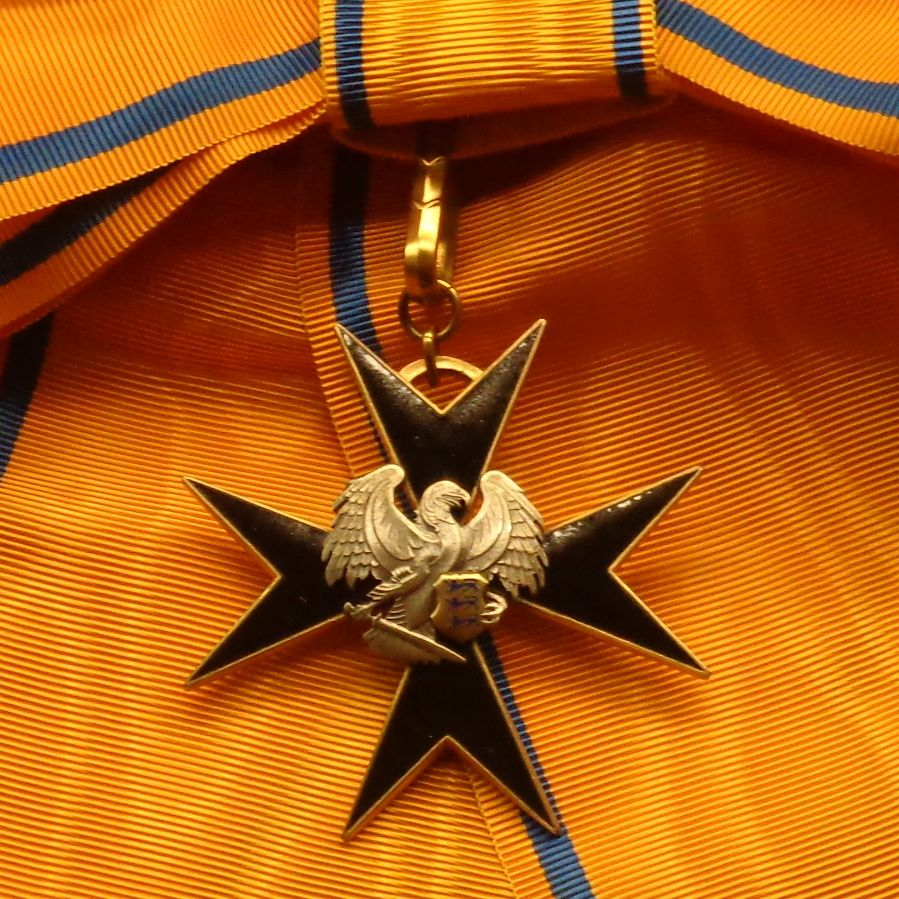
First Class Badge

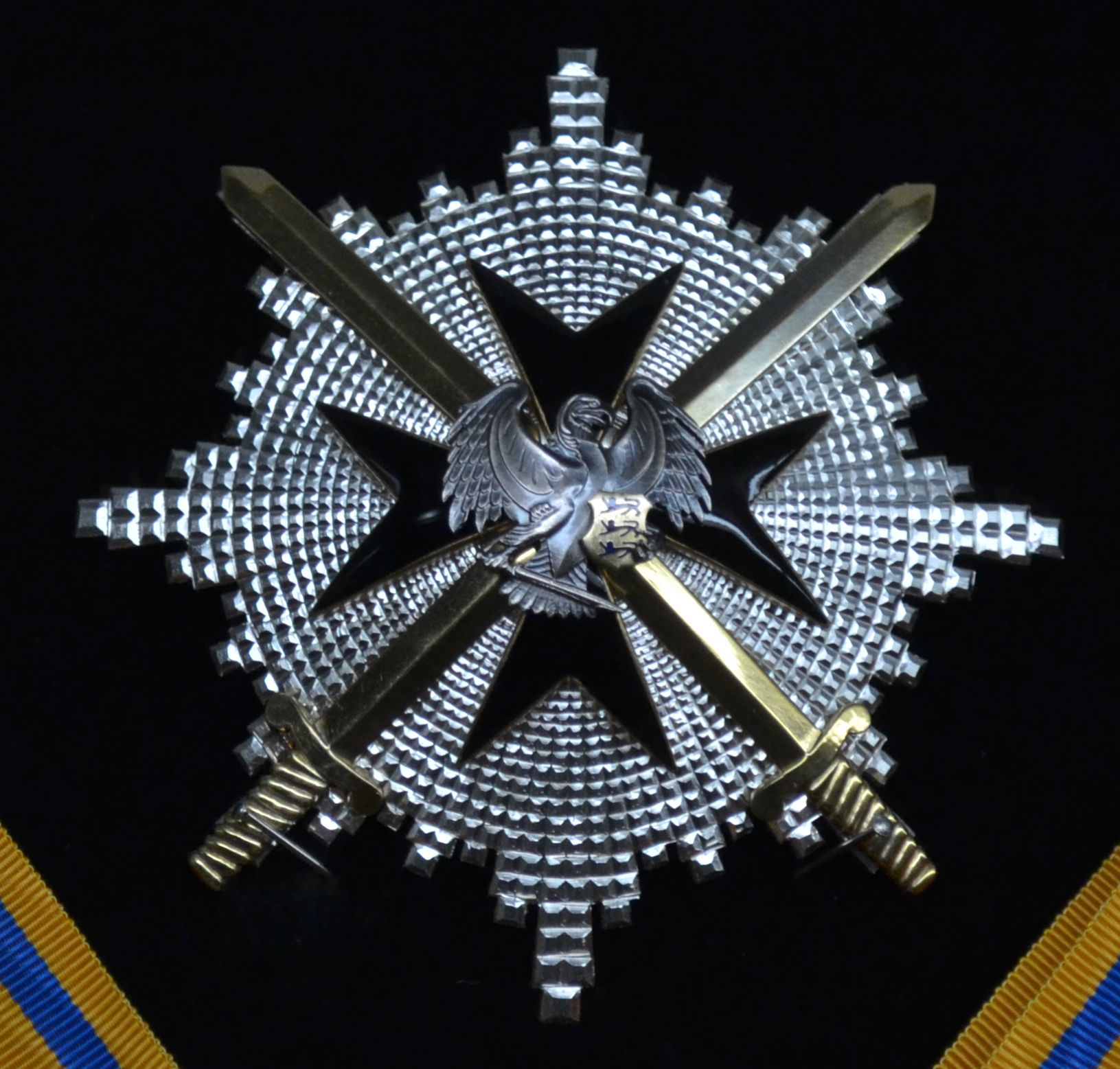
First Class Star

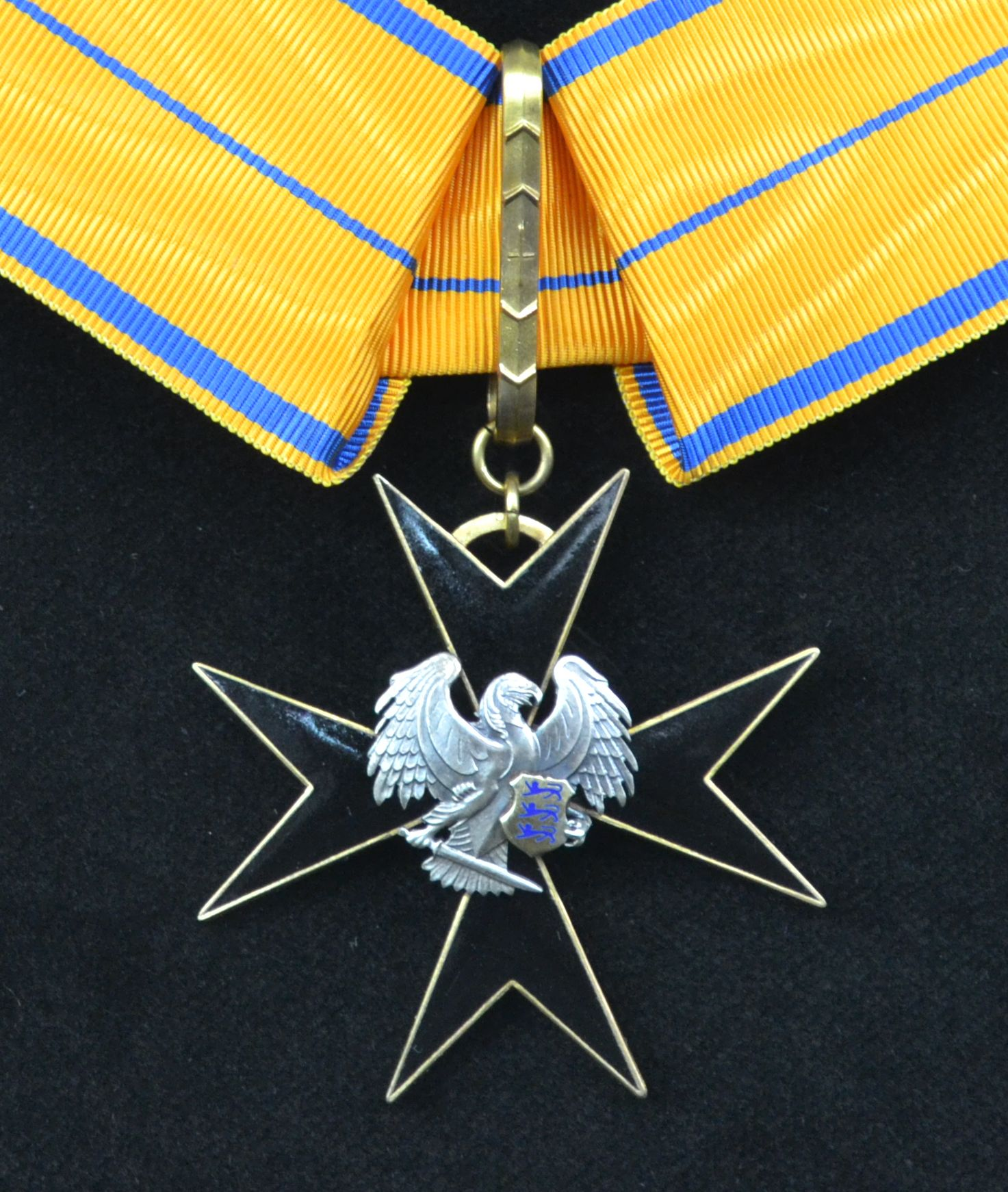
Second Class Badge

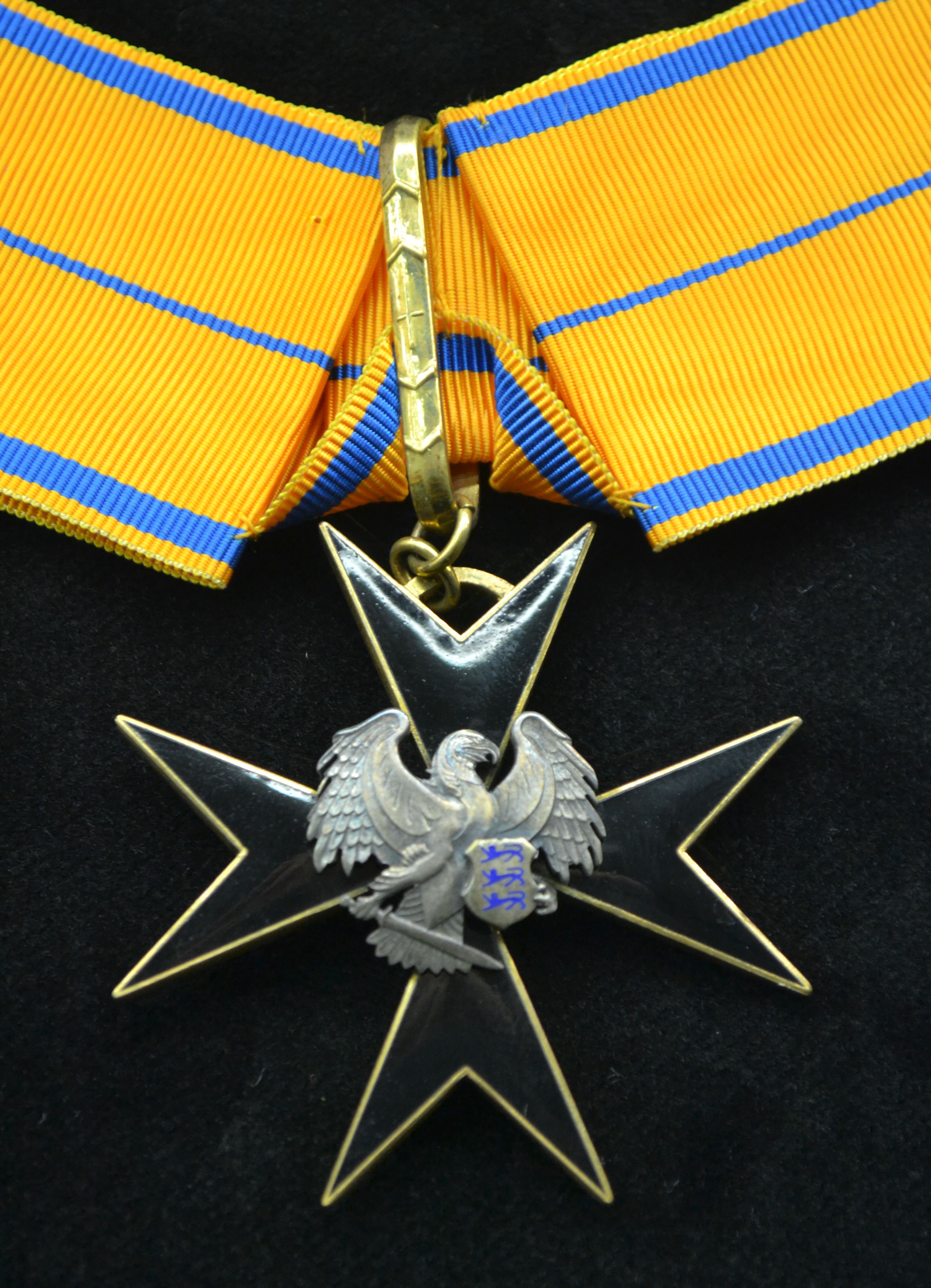
Third Class Badge

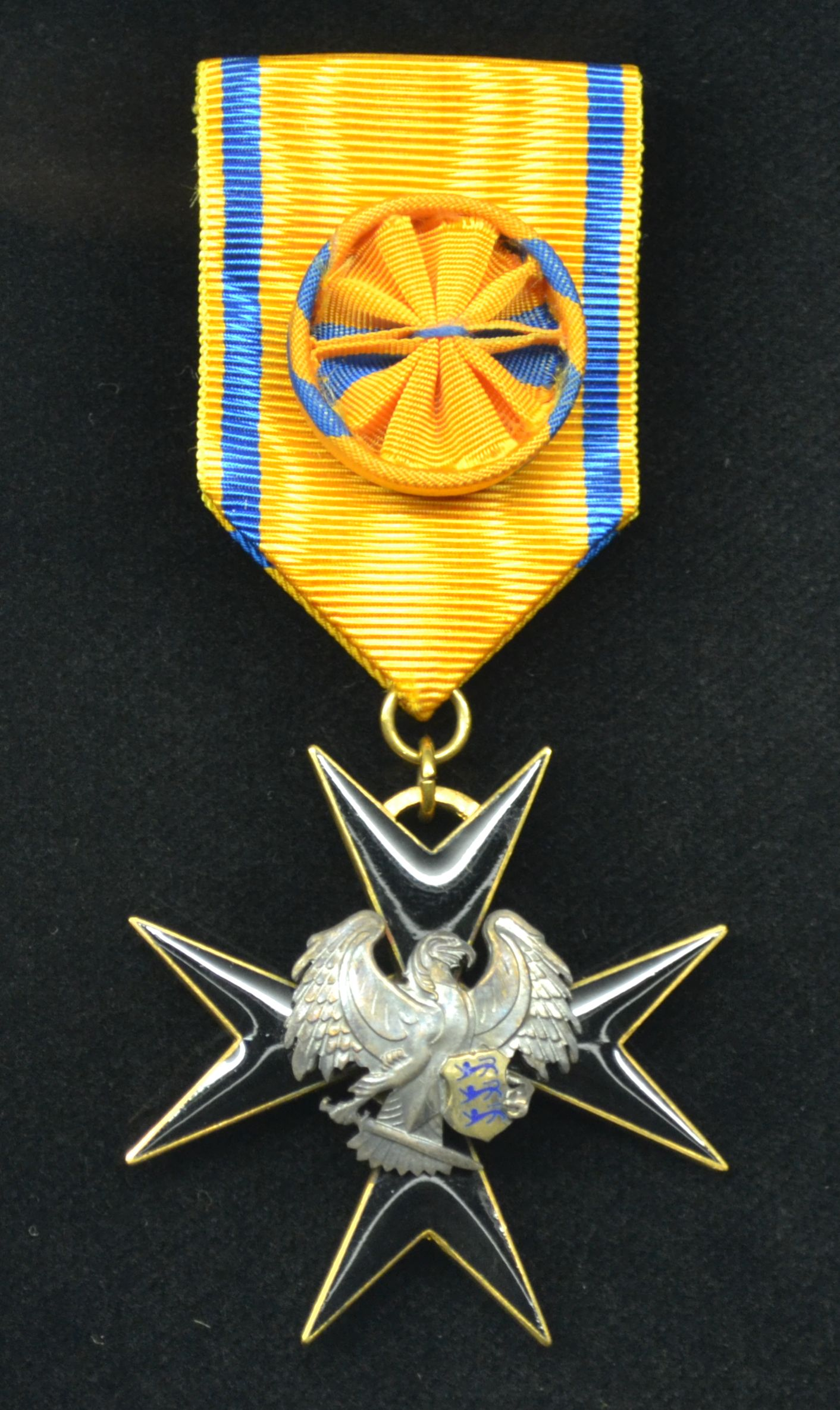
Fourth Class Badge

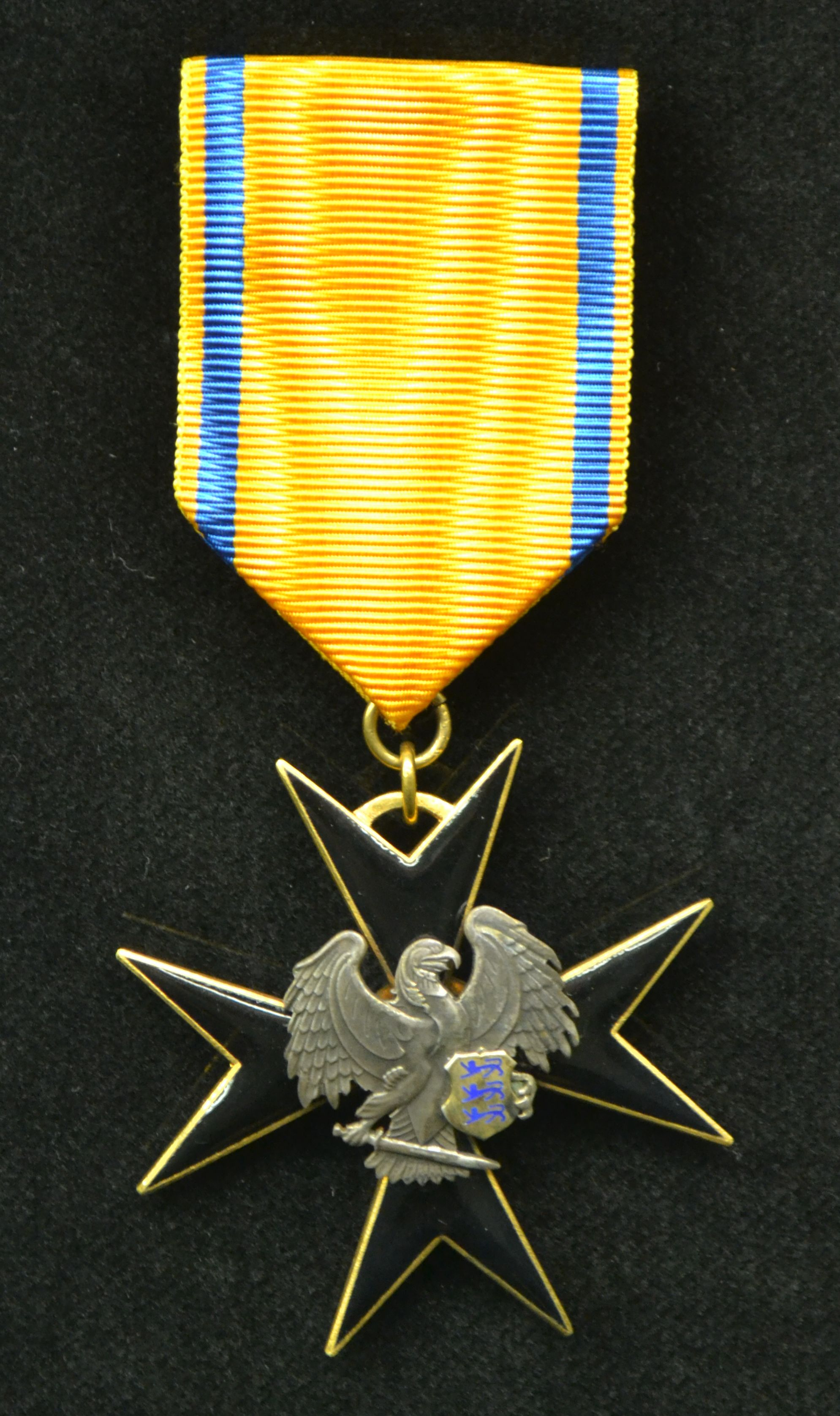
Fifth Class Badge

Ribbon	Name
	Order of the Cross of the Eagle, 1st Class
	Order of the Cross of the Eagle, 2nd Class
	Order of the Cross of the Eagle, 3rd Class
	Order of the Cross of the Eagle, 4th Class
	Order of the Cross of the Eagle, 5th Class
	Gold Cross of the Order of the Cross of the Eagle
	Silver Cross of the Order of the Cross of the Eagle
	Iron Cross of the Order of the Cross of the Eagle

== Order of the Estonian Red Cross ==
=== Insignia ===
Ribbon	Name
	Order of the Estonian Red Cross, 1st Class
	Order of the Estonian Red Cross, 2nd Class
	Order of the Estonian Red Cross, 3rd Class
	Order of the Estonian Red Cross, 4th Class
	Order of the Estonian Red Cross, 5th Class
	Medal of the Order of the Estonian Red Cross

== Notable awardees ==
Since the state's independence in 1991, every prime minister of Estonia has been awarded the 2nd Class Order of the National Coat of Arms.

Awardee name	Award given	Date awarded	Region	Country	Ref
Alar Karis; President of Estonia	Collar, ONCA; Fourth Class, OWS	11 October 2021; 23 February 2007	Europe	Estonia	
Arnold Rüütel; President	Collar, ONCA; Collar, OCTM	23 February 2008; 8 October 2001	Europe	Estonia	
Ingrid Rüütel; Wife of Estonian President Arnold Rüütel	First Class, OWS; Third Class, OERC	23 February 2008; 24 March 1997	Europe	Estonia	
Toomas Hendrik Ilves; President	Collar, ONCA; Collar, OCTM; Third Class, ONCA	23 February 2008; 9 January 2006; 23 February 2004	Europe	Estonia	
Kersti Kaljulaid; President	Collar, ONCA	10 October 2016	Europe	Estonia	
Helle Meri; Widow of Lennart Meri	First Class, OERC	23 February 2004	Europe	Estonia	
Albert II; King	Collar, OCTM	10 June 2008	Europe	Belgium	
Paola; Queen	First Class, OCTM	10 June 2008	Europe	Belgium	
Frederik X of Denmark; King	First Class, OCTM	28 November 1995	Europe	Denmark	
Margrethe II; Queen	Collar, OCTM	28 November 1995	Europe	Denmark	
Henri; Grand Duke	Collar, OCTM	5 May 2003	Europe	Luxembourg	
Willem-Alexander; King	Collar, OCTM	12 June 2018	Europe	Netherlands	
Máxima; Queen	First Class, OCTM	12 June 2018	Europe	Netherlands	
Beatrix; Queen	Collar, OCTM	14 May 2008	Europe	Netherlands	
Harald V King	Collar, OCTM; Collar, OWS	31 August 1998; 2 September 2014	Europe	Norway	
Sonja; Queen	First Class, OCTM	31 August 1998	Europe	Norway	
Haakon; Crown Prince	First Class, OCTM	10 April 2002	Europe	Norway	
Mette-Marit; Crown Princess	First Class, OCTM	10 April 2002	Europe	Norway	
Felipe VI; King	First Class, OCTM	9 July 2007	Europe	Spain	
Letizia; Queen	First Class, OCTM	9 July 2007	Europe	Spain	
Juan Carlos I King	Collar, OCTM	9 July 2007	Europe	Spain	
Sofía; Queen	First Class, OCTM	9 July 2007	Europe	Spain	
Carl XVI Gustaf; King	Collar, OCTM; Collar, OWS	11 September 1995; 18 January 2011	Europe	Sweden	
Silvia; Queen	First Class, OCTM; First Class, OWS	11 September 1995; 12 January 2011	Europe	Sweden	
Victoria; Crown Princess	First Class, OCTM; First Class, OWS	11 September 1995; 12 January 2011	Europe	Sweden	
Prince Daniel; Prince	First Class, OCTM	18 January 2011	Europe	Sweden	
Prince Carl Philip; Prince, Duke of Värmland	First Class, OCTM	18 January 2011	Europe	Sweden	
Akihito; Emperor Emeritus	Collar, OCTM	24 May 2007	Asia	Japan	
Alexander Van der Bellen; President	Collar, OCTM	26 May 2021	Europe	Austria	
Doris Schmidauer; Wife of Alexander Van der Bellen	First Class, OCTM	26 May 2021	Europe	Austria	
Georgi Parvanov; President	Collar, OCTM	11 June 2003	Europe	Bulgaria	
Zorka Parvanova; Wife of President Georgi Parvanov of Bulgaria	First Class, OCTM	11 June 2003	Europe	Bulgaria	
Alexander Stubb; President	Collar, OCTM; First Class, OCTM	23 May 2024; 13 May 2014	Europe	Finland	
Suzanne Innes-Stubb; Wife of President Alexander Stubb of Finland	First Class, OCTM	23 May 2024	Europe	Finland	
Tarja Halonen; President	Collar, OCTM; Collar, OWS; First Class, OWS	16 May 2000; 14 March 2007; 16 May 1995	Europe	Finland	
Pentti Arajärvi; Husband of President Tarja Halonen of Finland	First Class, OCTM; First Class, OWS	16 May 2000; 14 March 2007	Europe	Finland	
Sauli Niinistö; President	Collar, OCTM	13 May 2014	Europe	Finland	
Jenni Haukio; Wife of President Sauli Niinistö of Finland	First Class, OCTM	13 May 2014	Europe	Finland	
Tellervo Koivisto; Widow of Mauno Koivisto	First Class, OCTM	20 November 2001	Europe	Finland	
Eeva Ahtisaari; Widow of Martti Ahtisaari	First Class, OCTM	16 May 1995	Europe	Finland	
Mikheil Saakashvili; President	Collar, OCTM	7 May 2007	Europe	Georgia	
Joachim Gauck; President	Collar, OCTM	9 July 2013	Europe	Germany	
Daniela Schadt; Partner of Joachim Gauck of Germany	First Class, OCTM	9 July 2013	Europe	Germany	
Christina Rau; Widow of Johannes Rau	First Class, OCTM	7 November 2000	Europe	Germany	
Ólafur Ragnar Grímsson; President	Collar, OCTM; Collar, OWS	8 June 1998; 4 May 2004	Europe	Iceland	
Mary McAleese; President	Collar, OCTM	24 May 2001	Europe	Ireland	
Martin McAleese; Husband of President Mary McAleese of Ireland	First Class, OCTM	24 May 2001	Europe	Ireland	
Sergio Mattarella; President	Collar, OCTM	4 July 2018	Europe	Italy	
Laura Mattarella; Daughter of Sergio Mattarella of Italy	First Collar, OCTM	4 July 2018	Europe	Italy	
Nursultan Nazarbayev; President	Collar, OCTM	20 April 2011	Asia	Kazakhstan	
Guntis Ulmanis; President	Collar, OCTM	23 October 1986	Europe	Latvia	
Vaira Vīķe-Freiberga; President	Collar, OCTM; Collar, OWS	2 May 2000; 7 December 2005	Europe	Latvia	
Imants Freibergs; Husband of President Vaira Vīķe-Freiberga	First Class, OCTM; First Class, OWS	2 May 2000; 7 December 2005	Europe	Latvia	
Valdis Zatlers; President	Collar, OCTM	7 April 2009	Europe	Latvia	
Lilita Zatlere; Wife of President Valdis Zatlers of Latvia	First Class, OCTM	7 April 2009	Europe	Latvia	
Andris Bērziņš; President	Collar, OCTM	5 June 2012	Europe	Latvia	
Dace Seisuma; Former wife of Andris Bērziņš	First Class, OCTM	5 June 2012	Europe	Latvia	
Raimonds Vējonis; President	Collar, OCTM	10 April 2019	Europe	Latvia	
Iveta Vējone; Wife of President Raimonds Vējonis of Latvia	First Class, OCTM	10 April 2019	Europe	Latvia	
Egils Levits; President	Collar, OCTM	24 April 2023	Europe	Latvia	
Andra Levite; Wife of President Egils Levits of Latvia	First Class, OCTM	19 April 2023	Europe	Latvia	
Valdas Adamkus; President	Collar, OCTM; Collar, OWS	4 October 1999; 4 October 2004	Europe	Lithuania	
Dalia Grybauskaite; President	Collar, OCTM	27 May 2013	Europe	Lithuania	
George Abela; President	Collar, OCTM	31 May 2012	Europe	Malta	
Margaret Abela; Wife of President George Abela of Malta	First Class, OCTM	31 May 2012	Europe	Malta	
Ernesto Zedillo; President	Collar, OCTM	27 October 1995	North America	Mexico	
Lech Wałęsa; President	First Class, OCTM	23 February 2006	Europe	Poland	
Aleksander Kwaśniewski; President	Collar, OCTM; Collar, OWS	28 April 1998; 18 March 2002	Europe	Poland	
Jolanta Kwaśniewska; Wife of President Aleksander Kwaśniewski of Poland	First Class, OCTM	18 March 2002	Europe	Poland	
Bronisław Komorowski; President	Collar, OCTM	18 March 2014	Europe	Poland	
Marcelo Rebelo de Sousa; President	Collar, OCTM	15 April 2019	Europe	Portugal	
Aníbal Cavaco Silva; President	Collar, OCTM	24 September 2008	Europe	Portugal	
Maria José Ritta; Widow of Jorge Sampaio	First Class, OCTM; First Class, OWS	12 May 2003; 28 November 2005	Europe	Portugal	
Klaus Iohannis; President	Collar, OCTM	16 June 2021	Europe	Romania	
Ion Iliescu; President	Collar, OCTM	23 October 2003	Europe	Romania	
Traian Băsescu; President	Collar, OCTM	12 April 2011	Europe	Romania	
Maria Băsescu; Wife of President Traian Băsescu of Romania	First Class, OCTM	12 April 2011	Europe	Romania	
Ivan Gašparovič; President	Collar, OCTM	12 October 2005	Europe	Slovakia	
Andrej Kiska; President	Collar, OCTM	19 October 2015	Europe	Slovakia	
Milan Kučan; President	Collar, OCTM	16 May 1997	Europe	Slovenia	
Borut Pahor; President	Collar, OCTM	2 September 2019	Europe	Slovenia	
Joe Biden; President	First Class, OCTM	30 August 2013	North America	United States	
Bill Clinton; President	First Class, OCTM	6 February 2006	North America	United States	
Hillary Clinton; Secretary of State	First Class, OCTM	6 February 2013	North America	United States	
George W. Bush; President	First Class, OCTM	10 May 2017	North America	United States	

== Related awards ==
State awards that recognise public service contributions but are below the level state orders, often cover areas like border security and environmental conservation. This includes medals given by the government to those who have served in the defence forces domestically or abroad.Similarly, municipal recognitions are given by local governments for acts impacting city or regional development.

Ribbon	Name
	Defence Forces Decoration of Merit
	Defence Forces Decoration of Merit (with swords, for combat merit)
	Defence Forces Cross of Merit for National Defence
	Defence Forces Cross of Merit for Meritorious Service
	Memorial Medal "10 Years of the Re-Established Defence Forces"
	Cross of Merit of the Estonian Defence Forces General Staff
	Navy Decoration of Merit "Faith and Will", 1st Class
	Navy Decoration of Merit "Faith and Will", 2nd Class
	Navy Decoration of Merit "Faith and Will", 3rd Class
	Decoration of Honour of the Defence Forces NCO School
	Medal for Participants in International Military Operations (1–3 missions)
	Medal for Participants in International Military Operations
	Memorial Medal "10 Years of the Re-Established Border Guard"
	Border Guard Cross of Merit, 1st Class
Image unavailable	Border Guard Cross of Merit, 2nd Class
Image unavailable	Border Guard Cross of Merit, 3rd Class
	Cross of Merit of the Reserve Officers' Association, 1st Class
	Cross of Merit of the Reserve Officers' Association, 2nd Class
	Cross of Merit of the Reserve Officers' Association, 3rd Class
	Cross of Merit of the Ministry of Defence
	White Cross of the Defence League, 1st Class
	White Cross of the Defence League, 2nd Class
	White Cross of the Defence League, 3rd Class
	Defence League Medal of Merit, Special Class
	Defence League Medal of Merit, 1st Class
	Defence League Medal of Merit, 2nd Class
	Defence League Medal of Merit, 3rd Class
	Defence League Distinguished Service Decoration
	Special Cross of Merit of the Defence League School
	Cross of Merit of the Defence League School
	Bearer of the Victory Fire Medal
Image unavailable	Foreign Intelligence Service Distinguished Service Decoration, 1st Class
	Foreign Intelligence Service Distinguished Service Decoration, 2nd Class
Image unavailable	Foreign Intelligence Service Distinguished Service Decoration, 3rd Class
	Peace Operations Centre Distinguished Service Decoration
	Land Forces Officer's Gold Cross
	Land Forces Officer's Silver Cross
	Land Forces Silver Cross
	Land Forces Bronze Cross
	Cross of Merit, 1st Class (Ministry of Foreign Affairs)
	Cross of Merit, 2nd Class (Ministry of Foreign Affairs)
	Cross of Merit, 3rd Class (Ministry of Foreign Affairs)
Image unavailable	Grand Gold Cross of the Rescue Services
	Golden Cross of the Rescue Board
	Silver Cross of the Rescue Board
Image unavailable	Rescue Services Medal
Image unavailable	Firefighter Medal "For Diligence"
Image unavailable	Firefighter Badge "For Diligence"
Image unavailable	Tartu Fire Department Badge
	Order of Bishop Platon (Estonian Apostolic Orthodox Church)
	"St. George's Night Great Star" Badge
	"St. George's Night Star" Badge
	Decoration of the Estonian Olympic Committee
	Memorial Cross "Spearhead Admiral Pitka"
	Armed Resistance Cross of Merit
	Commemorative Medal for the Estonian War of Independence (1920)
	Commemorative Decoration of the Estonian Red Cross (1920–1926)
	Medal of Merit of the Admiral Johan Pitka Brothers-in-Arms Club
	Eastern Prefecture Distinguished Service Decoration
Image unavailable	Police Cross of Merit, 1st Class
	Police Cross of Merit, 2nd Class
Image unavailable	Police Cross of Merit, 3rd Class
	Police and Border Guard Board Distinguished Service Decoration
	Medal for participation in Baltic Air Policing (Latvian-Lithuanian-Estonian)
	Gold Medal of Merit of the Baltic Defence College (Latvian-Lithuanian-Estonian)
	Silver Medal of Merit of the Baltic Defence College(Latvian-Lithuanian-Estonian)
	Bronze Medal of Merit of the Baltic Defence College (Latvian-Lithuanian-Estonian)
	Medal of Merit of the Baltic Defence College (Latvian-Lithuanian-Estonian; general ribbon)
	Baltic Defence College Service Cross (Latvian-Lithuanian-Estonian)

== See also ==
- Broken Cornflower badge
- Commemorative Medal for the Estonian War of Independence
- National Library of Estonia
- Protection of Natural Amenities Medal
