= Andres Mathiesen =

Estonian forest scientist

Andres Mathiesen (until 1938 Andrei Mathiesen; 1 December 1890 Sindi – 3 May 1955 near Stockholm) was an Estonian forest scientist. He was the first Estonian doctor and professor of forestry science.

In 1950, he graduated from St. Petersburg Forestry Institute. From 1920 to 1944, he taught at Tartu University (since 1924 professor). From 1941 to 1943, he was the prorector of Tartu University. In 1944, when the Soviet Union occupied Estonia, he moved his entire family to Sweden for safety. From 1951 to 1955, he worked at Stockholm Forestry Institute (Estonian: Stockholmi puidu-uurimisinstituut). His daughter Aino Käärik followed in his footsteps and became a professor of botany and microbiology specializing in wood fungi.

He was one of the founders of Estonian higher education of forestry and Academical Forestry Association (Estonian: Akadeemiline Metsaselts).

Awards:

- 1940: Protection of Natural Amenities Medal, II rank
