= Protection of Natural Amenities Medal =

Estonian award

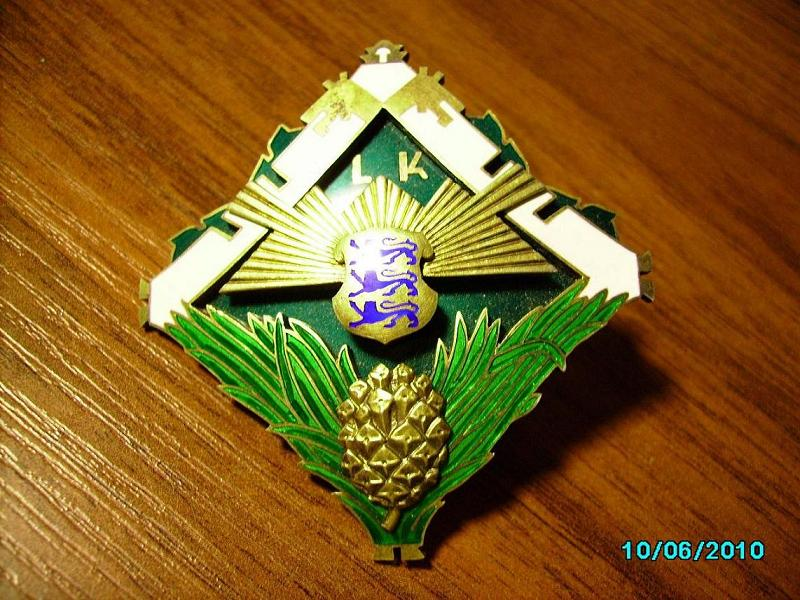
Protection of Natural Amenities Medal

The Protection of Natural Amenities Medal (Estonian: Looduskaitsemärk) was an Estonian award conferred to the trustees of Protection of Natural Amenities and other persons who are distinguished in the work of nature protection. Statutes of this award were granted by the President of the Republic, 27 February 1940.

This Medal was granted in three ranks by the Council of Protection of Natural Amenities. This is a rhombus-shaped badge (in gold, silver or bronze, respectively to the rank) with green enamel, representing small State Arms with rays and letters LK (Looduskaitse), bordered by the gable of an Estonian farmhouse above, and a pine-cone with needles below. Medal exists in full size, worn in right breast, or in miniature, worn in left buttonhole.

Granting of this Medal was intended May 1 of every year but because of beginning of Soviet occupation this was granted only once, May 1, 1940. This was handed over in towns by the Mayors and in the country by the Chairmen of rural councils. In the County of Harju and in Tallinn the Director of the Institute of Protection of Natural Amenities and Tourism presented this medal. Additionally on June 20, 1940 two more medals were granted, but not handed over to recipients.

== Recipients of the Protection of Natural Amenities Medal ==
=== I Rank ===
- Konstantin Päts, President of the Republic

=== II Rank ===
- Heinrich Koppel, former Rector of the University of Tartu
- Oskar Kask, Minister of the Social Affairs
- Peeter Päts, Director of the Institute of Protection of Natural Amenities and Tourism
- Teodor Lippmaa, Professor of Tartu University
- Andres Mathiesen, Professor of Tartu University
- Gustav Vilbaste, Inspector of Protection of Natural Amenities
- Mihkel Härms
- Aleksander Tõnisson, Lord Mayor of Tallinn (granted on June 20, 1940)

=== III Rank ===
- Hans Alver, Mayor of Haapsalu
- Artur Toom
- Teodor Saar
- Eduard Kildemaa
- Eduard Keeleste
- Olga Kalm
- Joosep Eplik
- Mihkel Sild
- Lui Jõgi
- Bernhard Tuiskvere
- Artur Vainola (:et)
- Aleksander Suur (:et)
- Johannes Maide (:et)
- August Blaubrück
- Georg Janno
- Albert Soovere (granted on June 20, 1940)

== See also ==
- Estonian State Decorations
