= Aino Käärik =

Estonia-born Swedish biologist (1918–2021)

- Born: Aino Mathiesen; 20 November 1918; Sejla, Estonia
- Died: 15 July 2021 (aged 102); Sweden
- Education: University of Tartu, Estonia; Uppsala University, Sweden
- Occupations: Botanist, microbiologist, mycologist
- Known for: Wood fungi research
- Spouse: Kaljo Käärik
- Children: 2
- Father: Andres Mathiesen

Aino Käärik (née Aino Mathiesen) (20 November 1918 – 15 July 2021) was an Estonia-born Swedish botanist, microbiologist, mycologist and specialist in wood fungi. She lived and worked in both Estonia and Sweden.

== Biography ==
She was born in the village of Sejla, Estonia, to Hilda and Andres Mathiesen, who was a forestry professor at University of Tartu. Aino graduated from the Estonian Youth Education Society's Girls' Gymnasium in 1936. While attending the University of Tartu beginning in 1939, she worked as an assistant in the plant physiology laboratory. In 1941, she graduated cum laude from the University's Faculty of Mathematics and Natural Sciences as a botanist. The following year, she defended her Master of Science degree with the thesis "Determinations of Transpiration in Forest Plants on the Rangu Heath." However, in 1944, after Estonia was occupied by the Soviet Union near the end of World War II, the entire family fled the country for Sweden, by various routes. Aino travelled by way of Finland, arriving in Sweden in 1945.

There, Aino was a refugee and worked as a cleaner until she found employment as a botanist and was able to continue the forestry research she had begun in Estonia. At Uppsala University she completed a doctorate in botany and microbiology in 1960. She began working at the Royal Swedish Academy of Agriculture and Forestry in Stockholm, and in 1969, she was named a full professor there. From 1979 to 1985, she served as a full professor at the Faculty of Forestry at Uppsala University of Agriculture. She retired from academia in 1985 and was named professor emeritus at Uppsala University.

=== Research ===
Käärik's research focused on fungi that decompose wood and the distribution (with the help of insects) of wood-damaging fungi. Her early research centered on the ecology and taxonomy of Blue stain fungi associated with bark borer beetles. Later research focused on the taxonomy, ecology and identification of wood-decaying basidiomycetes, and the colonization by wood decay fungi collected during her regular autumn expeditions. She cultured these samples on agar media on her return to the lab. Her efforts allowed her to create a large sampling of mycelia of several decay fungi. She used microscopy to find methods for identifying the mycelia. She became known for co-authoring a comprehensive atlas of airborne fungal spores.

Käärik remained committed to scientific efforts in Estonia. After the country was freed from the de facto Soviet occupation in 1991, she donated 120 hectares (almost 300 acres) of land to the Faculty of Forestry of the Estonian University of Agriculture to support forest scientists there.

=== Later years ===
While hiking in the Swedish forests with her husband, she discovered the landscape of Öland and the couple bought a vacation home on the island. The property became a regular summer gathering place for the family, and later it was a retirement home where the couple lived year-round. After her husband's death, she lived there until the age of 98, joined during summer months by her daughter. The home was surrounded by a garden with rare plants, trees and shrubs.

At the 100-year jubilee celebration of her birth in 2018, a new fungal family and a new species were named after her: the genus Kaarikia and the species Kaarikia abrahomsonii.

She died at 103 on 15 July 2021.

=== Personal life ===
Aino Mathiesen met her future husband Kaljo Käärik in Sweden. They married in Stockholm in the spring of 1951 and had two children, Andres, a son who died in 2007, and a daughter, Aili-Reet Käärik, who is a botanist and environmental scientist.

=== Selected memberships ===
In 1976, Käärik was elected the first female chair of the Estonian Society of Learned People in Sweden. She was a member of the American Phytopathological Society, the Stockholm Botanical Society, the Estonian Academy of Women's Association, the Estonian Women's Student Association, the Forest Products Research Association, the International Research Group for Wood Protection, the New York Academy of Sciences and the Swedish Botanical Society.

== Selected publications ==
Some of her work was published using her full name: Aino Mathiesen-Käärik.

- Mathiesen-Käarik, Aino. "Some investigations on the spore content of the air in some timber yards and in Stockholm." (1955): 437-459.
- Käärik, Aino, and Erik Rennerfelt. "Investigations on the fungal flora of spruce and pine stumps." (1957).
- Mathiesen-Käärik, Aino. "Studies on the ecology, taxonomy and physiology of Swedish insect-associated blue stain fungi, especially the genus Ceratocystis." Oikos 11, no. Fasc. 1 (1960): 1-25.
- Käärik, Aino. "The identification of the mycelia of wood-decay fungi by their oxidation reactions with phenolic compounds." Studia Forestalia Suecica (1965).
- Käärik, Aino A. "Decomposition of wood: Biology of plant litter decomposition" (1974): 129-174.
- Käärik, Aino. "Succession of microorganisms during wood decay." In Biological Transformation of Wood by Microorganisms: Proceedings of the Sessions on Wood Products Pathology at the 2nd International Congress of Plant Pathology September 10–12, 1973, Minneapolis/USA, pp. 39-51. Berlin, Heidelberg: Springer Berlin Heidelberg, 1975.
- Käärik, Aino, M. J. Keller, M. E. Kiffer, J. Perreau, and M. O. Reisinger. Atlas of airborne fungal spores in Europe. Springer Science & Business Media, 2012.
