= Commemorative Medal for the Estonian War of Independence =

Estonian award

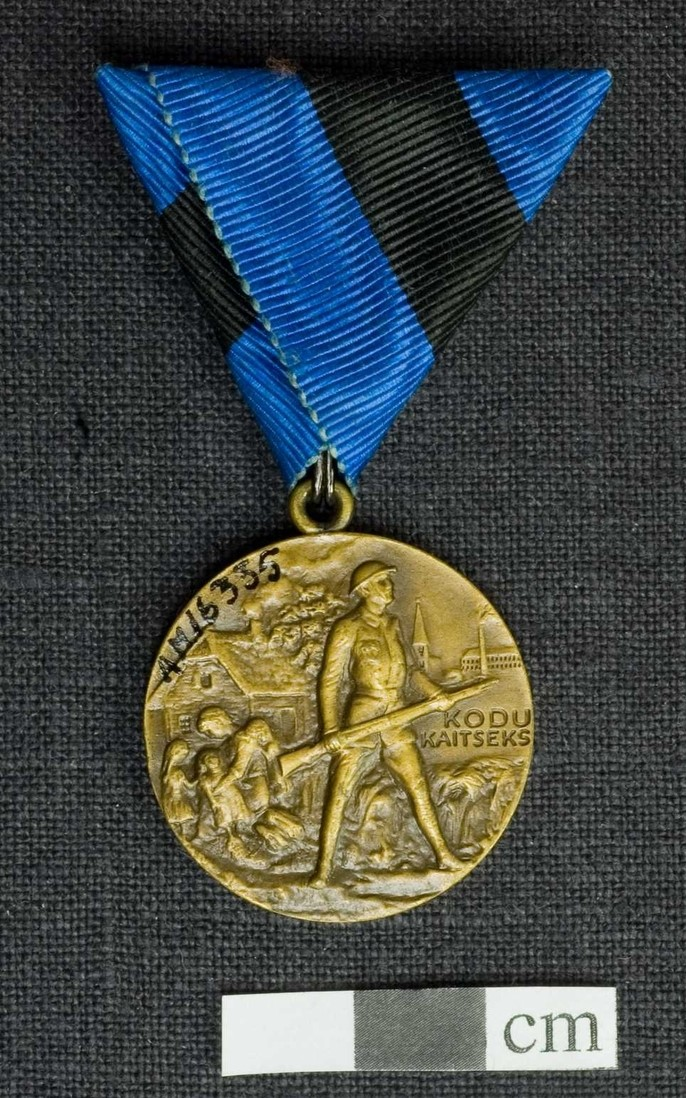
Commemorative Medal for the Estonian War of Independence

Commemorative Medal for the Estonian War of Independence (Estonian: Eesti Vabadussõja mälestusmärk) is an Estonian medal established on 14 December 1920. It was awarded to those who served in the Estonian War of Independence of 1918–1920.

The medal displays on the obverse an Estonian soldier in a protecting pose in front of a woman and children by a house, and the inscription "KODU KAITSEKS" ("For Defence of Home"). On the reverse, it bears the inscription "EESTI WABADUSSÕJA MÄLESTUSEKS" ("In Commemoration of Estonian Liberation War") and displays two crossed swords over a laurel branch and the dates '1918-1920' above.
