= Broken Cornflower badge =

Estonian commemorative badge

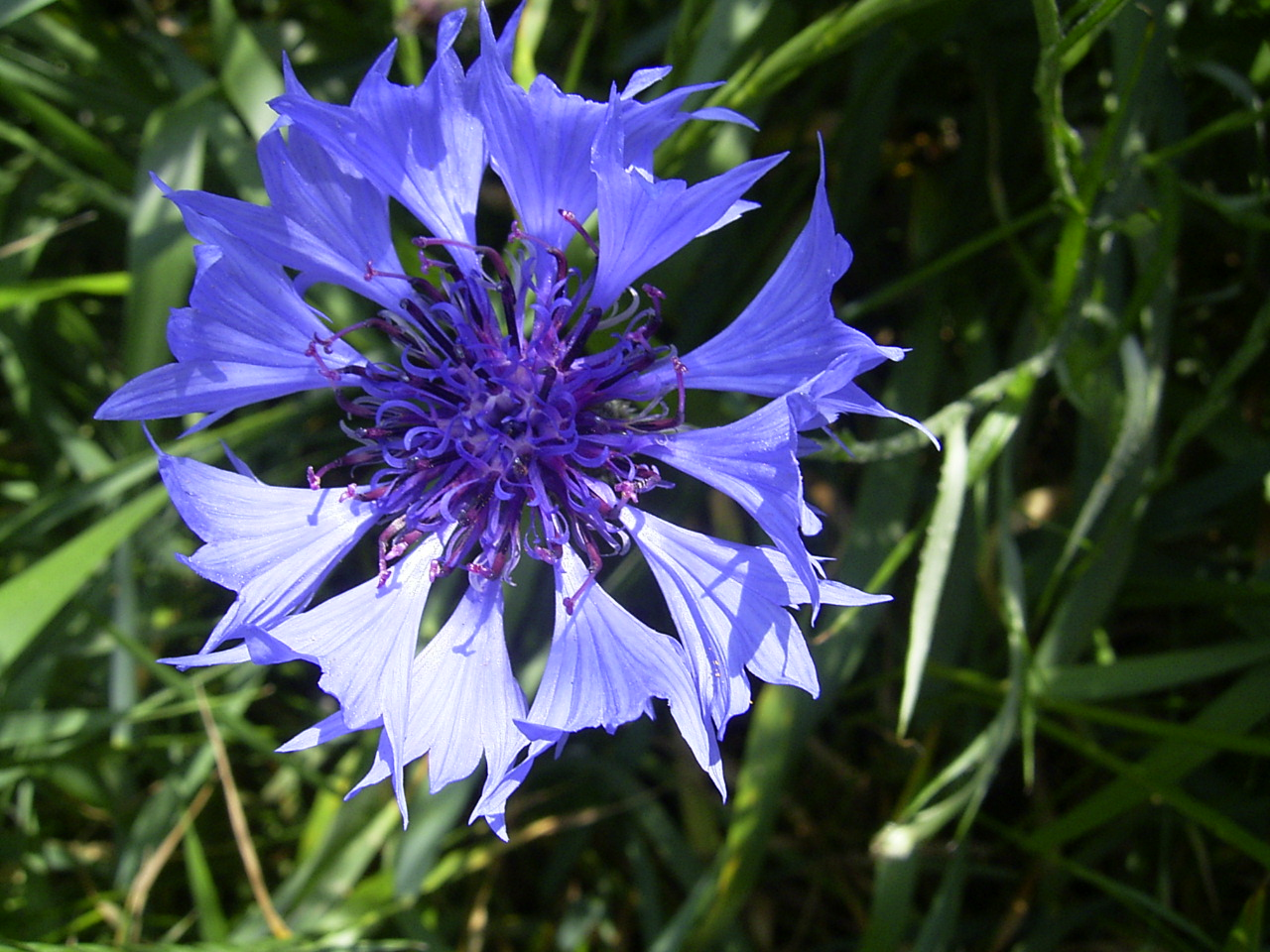
Cornflower

The Broken Cornflower badge (Estonian: Murtud Rukkilille märk) is a badge given by the Estonian Minister of Justice to persons repressed by the occupying regimes or persons equated a repressed person, in particular the ones repressed during the Soviet occupation of Estonia. It was introduced by President Lennart Meri in 2001 and the procedure of issuing the badges was formalized in 2004. The badge gives no additional preferences or benefits.

== History ==
The badge was designed by Heinz Valk.

The cornflower is one of the national symbols of Estonia and the broken cornflower symbolizes the repression of Estonians. After the June coup of 1940 many patriots wore a cornflower, because it became dangerous to wear badges or ribbons in national colors.

The public association of the cornflower with mass deportations was made even before Estonia restoring its independence. On June 14, 1990 (the anniversary of the June deportation) the memorial "Cornflower" was unveiled by the Memento society in the center of Tartu, based on the design of Paul Saar, "Cornflower on Siberian Rocks".

In 2001, during the events commemorating the Soviet occupation, Lennart Meri gave away several thousand badges and three thousand more eligible people who were unable to take part in the events, received the badge from municipal leaders.

== Description ==
The badge is made of silver-plated copper, circular, 14 mm in diameter with a pin on the back. It displays a cornflower flower with three blue petals on a broken stem in metallic color. It is attached to a blue-black-white polyester fiber ribbon of length 11 cm in length and width 1 cm.
