= Orders, decorations, and medals of Luxembourg =

The orders, decorations, and medals of Luxembourg have their foundation in the Duchy of Nassau. The top tier order of Luxembourg being the Order of the Gold Lion of the House of Nassau is the House Order of the House of Nassau. The next in the order of honours precedence is the Order of Adolphe of Nassau, was founded by Adolphe, Grand Duke of Luxembourg, in 1858 while he was the last reigning Duke of Nassau.

== Orders ==
- Order of the Gold Lion of the House of Nassau
- Order of Adolphe of Nassau
- Order of Merit of the Grand Duchy of Luxembourg
- Order of the Oak Crown
- Order of the Resistance
- National Order of the Medal of Merit for Sport
Three of the four main Orders of the Grand Duchy; The Order of Merit, The Order of Adolphe of Nassau and The Order of the Oak Crown

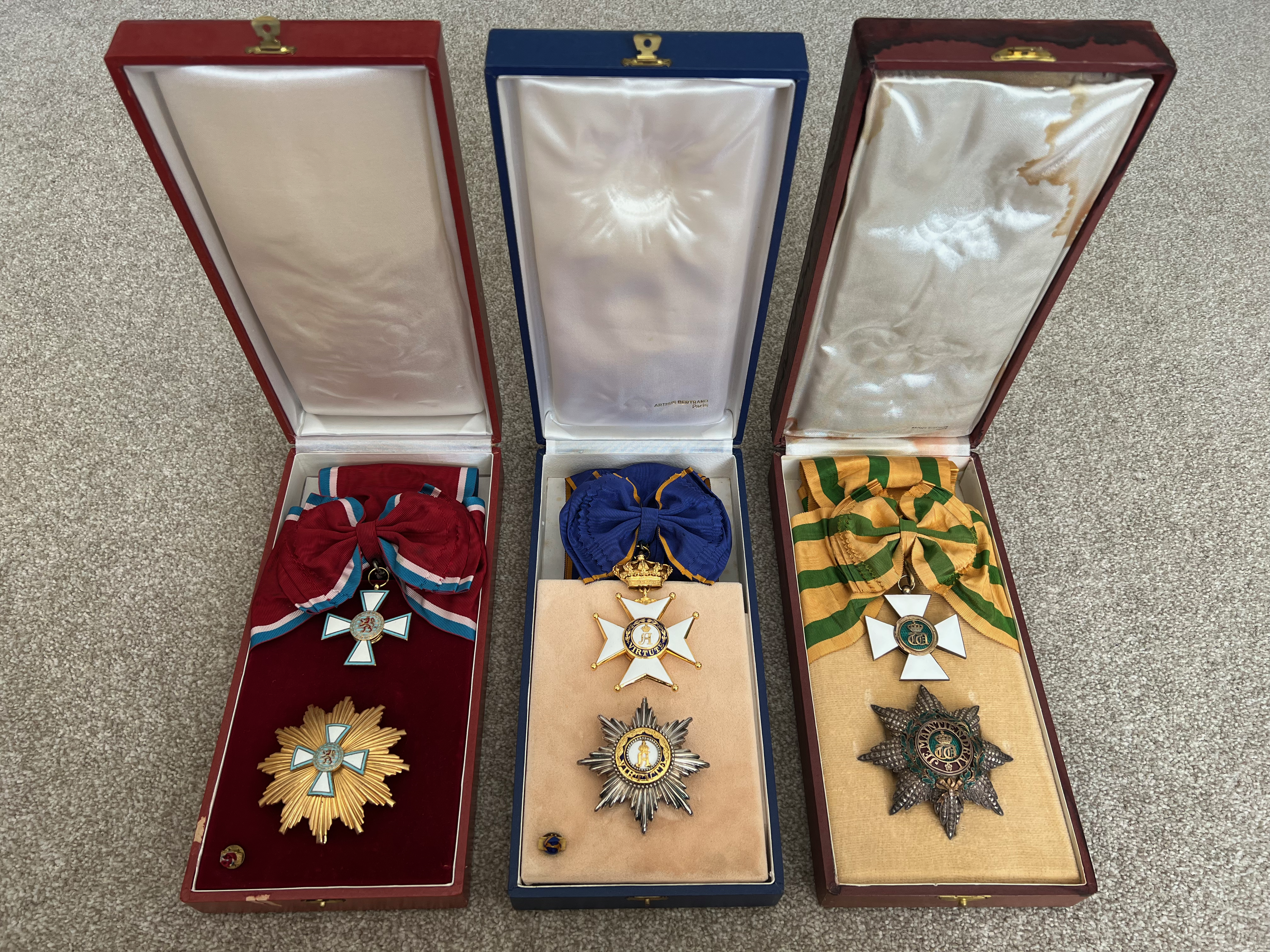

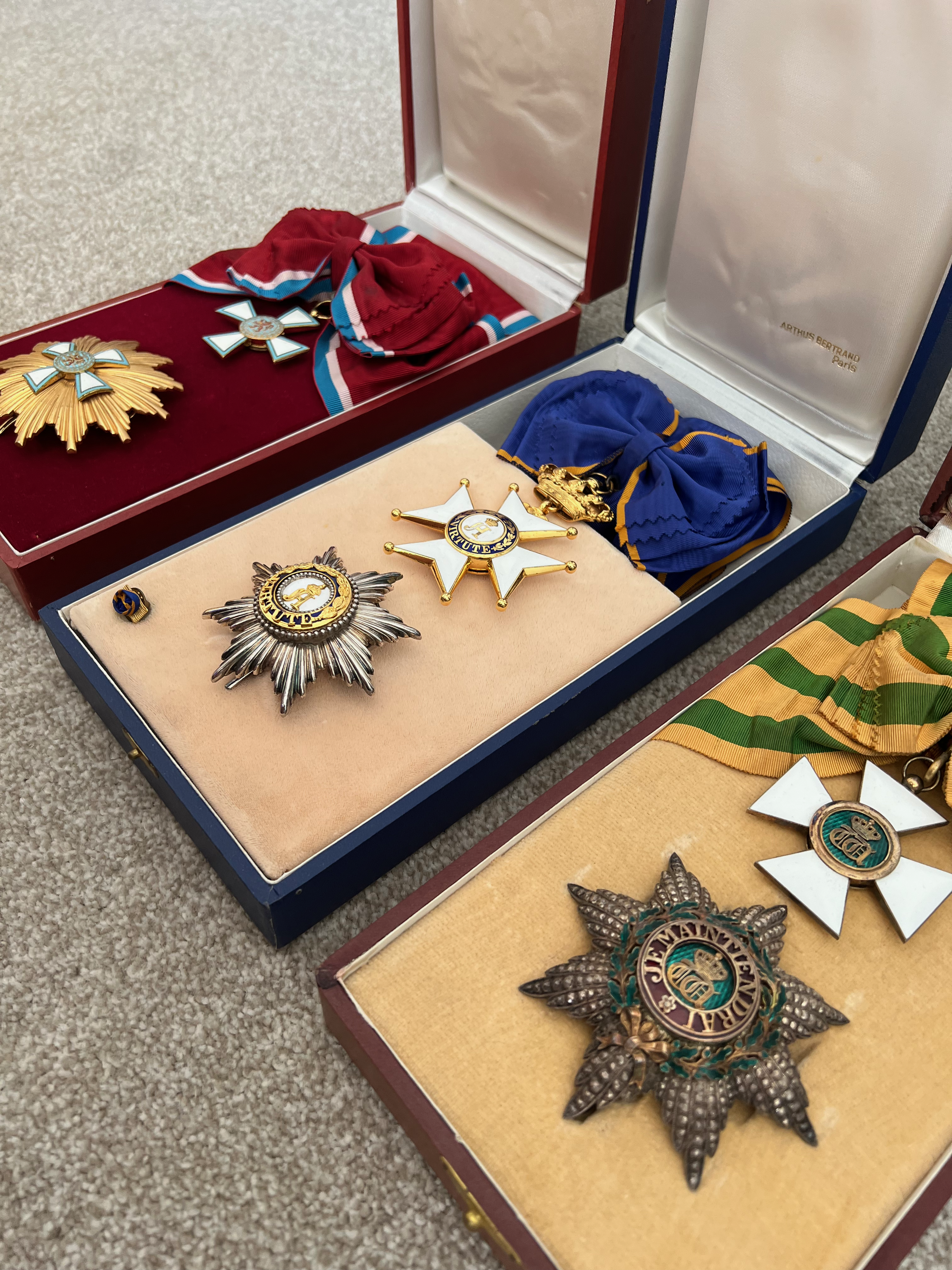

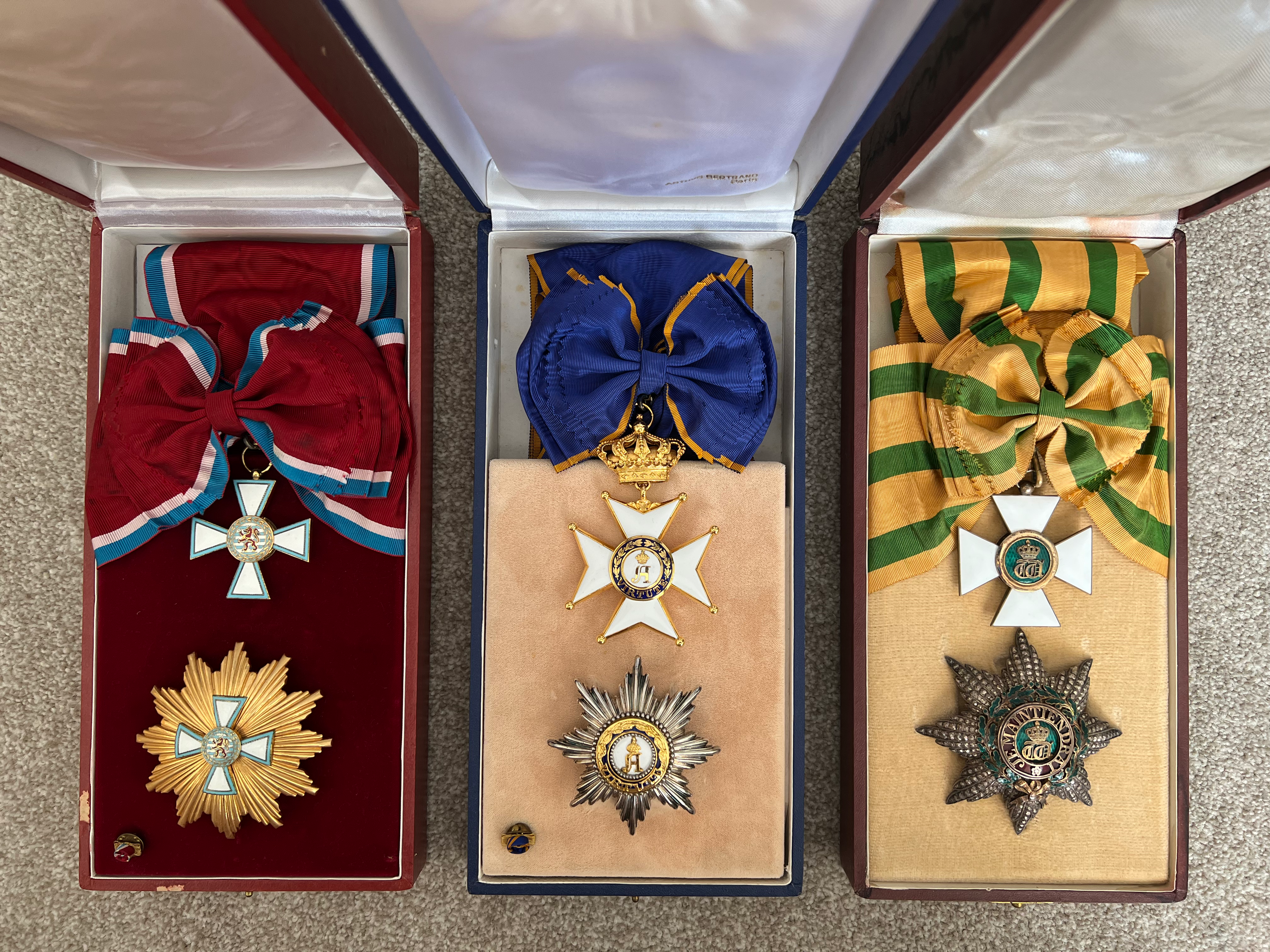

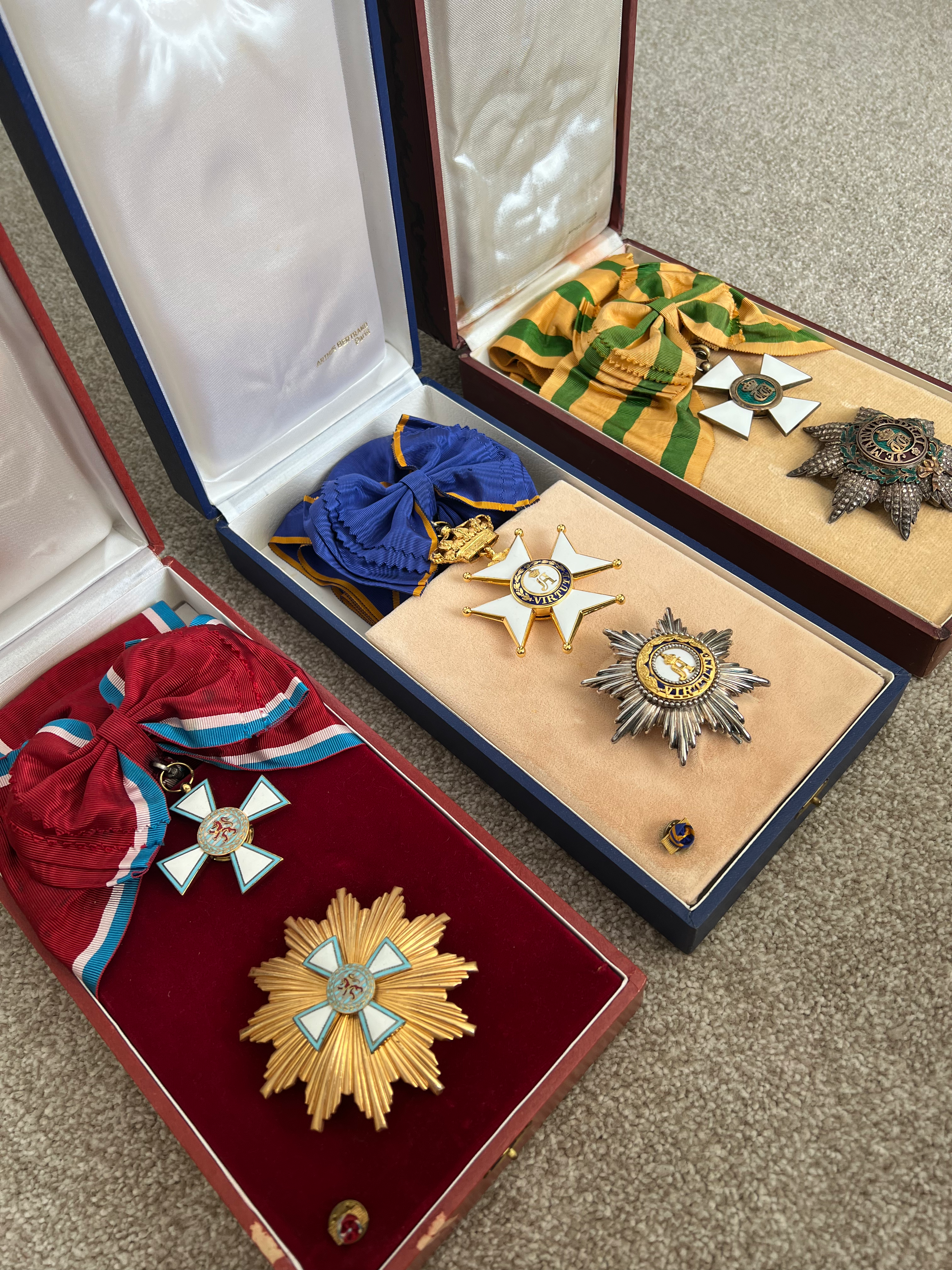

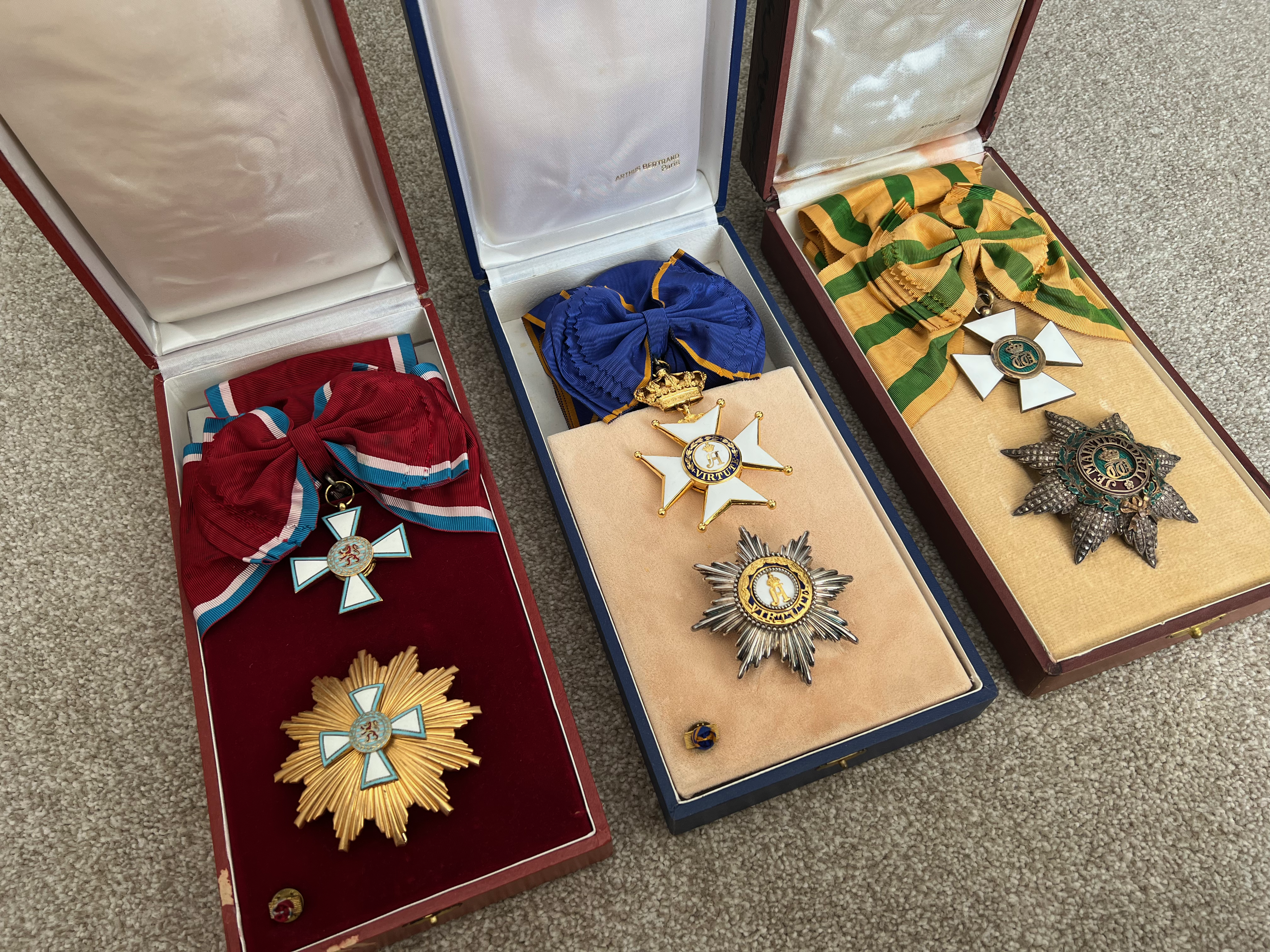

== Military decorations ==
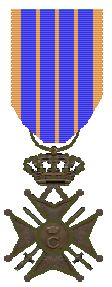
Luxembourg's 1944 Croix de guerre

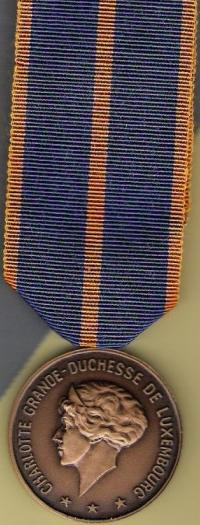
The Luxembourg Military Merit Medal

- Military Medal
- Cross of Honour and Military Merit
- War Cross
- 1914-18 Volunteers Medal
- 1940-45 Volunteers Medal
- Volunteer Long Service Cross
- Military Merit Veterans Medal

== Civil decorations ==
- Badge of the Resistance
- National Medal of Recognition
- Medal of Merit for Blood Donation
- Medal of Merit for Civil Defense
- Service Cross for Customs Officers
- Service Cross for Prison Guards
- Service Cross for Water and Forest Officers

== Commemorative medals ==
- Golden Wedding Medal 1901
- Commemorative Medal 1953
- Jubilee Medal 1981 HRH Henri and Maria Teresa (referring to the matrimonial union of the then Hereditary Grand Duke (later Grand Duke) and his wife.)
- Grand Duke Jean Silver Jubilee Medal 1989
