= Orders, decorations, and medals of the Dominican Republic =

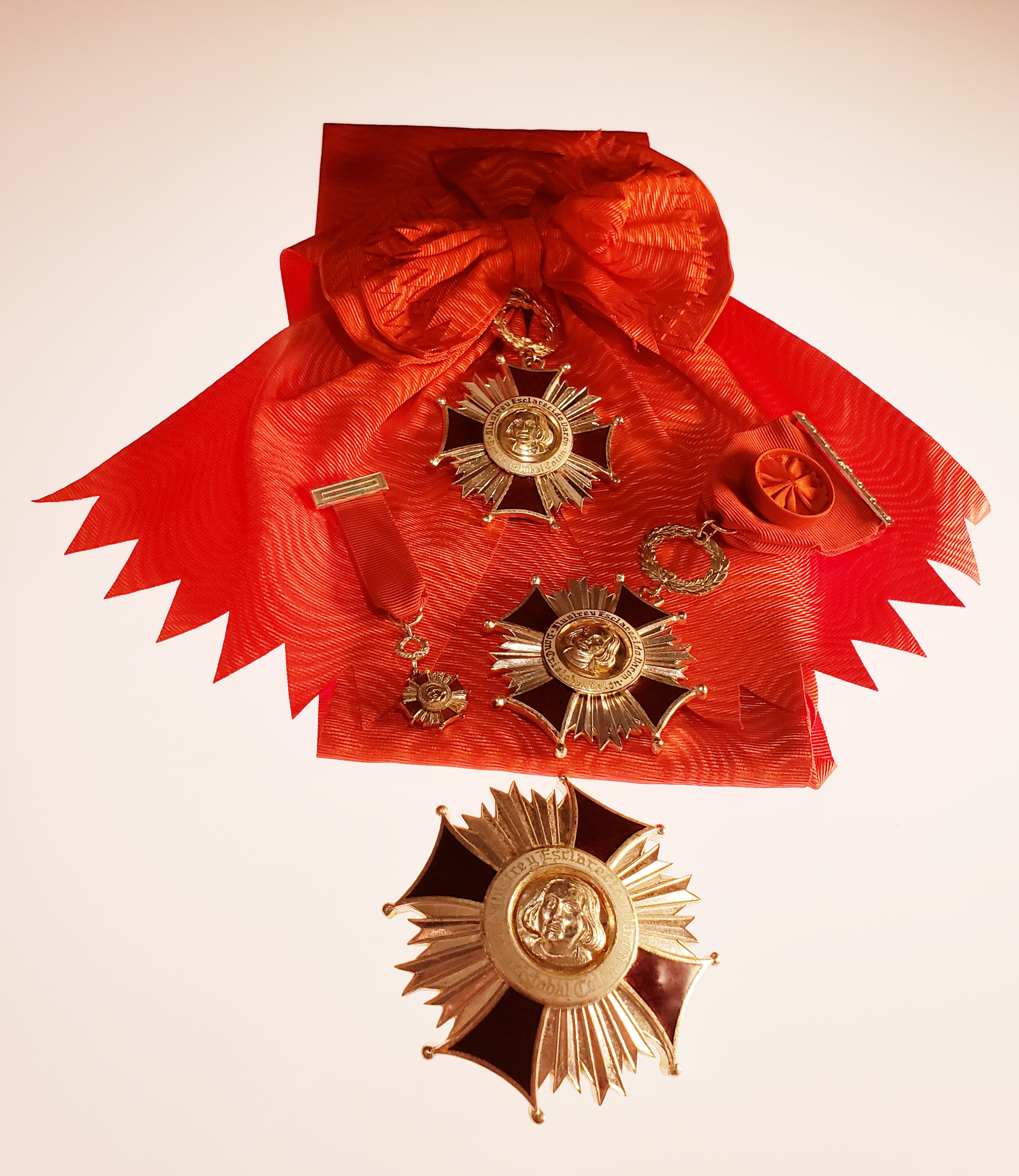
Order of Christopher Columbus

The Dominican honours system is a means of rewarding individuals' personal bravery, achievement or service to the Dominican Republic. The system consists of two types of awards: decorations and medals.

== Brief history ==
These were introduced within the Rafael Trujillo regime. Some of them were named after him; those were rescinded after his death on 30 May 1961.

== Currents orders and medals ==
These are the orders and medals actually awarded by the government of the Dominican Republic:

=== Orders ===
- The Order of Merit of Duarte, Sánchez and Mella (as Order of Merit of Duarte in 1931, name expanded 1954)
- The Order of Christopher Columbus (1937)
- The Order of Military Merit (1930)
- The Order of Air Merit (1952)
- The Order of Naval Merit (1954)
- The Captain General Santana Military Order of Heroism (1954)

=== Medals ===
- The Medal for Valor (1939)
- The Medal of Merit of the Dominican Woman (1985)

== Old orders and Medals ==
The following orders and medals were awarded by the government of the Dominican Republic until the death of Rafael Trujillo:

- The 23rd of February 1930 Commemorative Medal (1937)
- The Order of Trujillo (1938)
- The Order of the Generalissimo (1938)
- The President Trujillo Grand Cordon (1952)
- The Order of the National Benefactor (1955)
- The 14th of June Order of Merit (1961)
