= Order of merit (disambiguation) =

An order of merit is conferred by a state, government or royal family on an individual in recognition of military or civil merit.

Order of merit may also refer to:

- Borda's method, a voting system originally called the "order of merit"
- Merit order, a way of ranking available sources of energy, especially electrical generation, based on ascending order of price
- FIFA Order of Merit, for significant contribution to association football
- PDC Order of Merit, a world ranking system by the Professional Darts Corporation

== See also ==
- Cross of Merit (disambiguation)
- European Order of Merit
- Legion of Merit, a military award of the United States Armed Forces
- Medal of Merit (disambiguation)
- National Order of Merit (disambiguation)
- Order (distinction)
- Order of Civil Merit (disambiguation)
- Order of Honor
- Order of Military Merit (disambiguation)
- Order of Naval Merit (disambiguation)
- Socialist orders of merit
