= Order of merit =

Honorific order that is conferred by a sovereign entity

The cross of the Order pro Merito Melitensi, an order of merit established in 1920 by the Sovereign Military Order of Malta, an independent, Catholic order of chivalry and sovereign entity.

An order of merit is an honorific order that is conferred by a state, government, royal family, or other sovereign entity to an individual in recognition of military or civil merit. The historical background of the modern honours system of orders of merit may be traced to the emergence of chivalric orders during the Middle Ages.

Orders of merit may be bestowed as official awards by states, or as dynastic orders by royal families. In the case of modern republics, an order of merit may constitute the highest award conferred by the state authority.

== List of national orders of merit ==
- Order of Merit of the Bavarian Crown, established in 1808 by the Kingdom of Bavaria
- National Order of Merit (Paraguay), established in 1865
- Order of Agricultural Merit (France), established in 1883
- Order of Merit, a Commonwealth order established in 1902 by King Edward VII
- Order of the Cross of Liberty (Finland), established in 1918
- Order of the White Rose of Finland, established in 1919
- Order pro Merito Melitensi, established in 1920 as a state decoration by the Sovereign Military Order of Malta
- Order of Merit (Lebanon), established in 1922 as the highest honour of the Republic of Lebanon
- Order of the Three Stars, established in 1924 as the highest honour of the Republic of Latvia
- Order of Civil Merit, Spain, established in 1926
- National Order of Honour and Merit (Haiti), established in 1926
- Order of Merit (Portugal), established in 1927, known by its current name since 1976
- Order of Merit (Chile), established in 1929
- Ordre du Mérite Maritime, established in 1930
- Order of Merit of the Principality of Liechtenstein, established in 1937
- Order of the Lion of Finland, established in 1942
- Order of Civil Merit (Bulgaria), established in 1891, reestablished in 2003
- Legion of Merit, established by the United States Government in 1942
- National Order of Merit (Brazil), established in 1946
- Order of Civic Merit of Laos, established in 1950
- Order of Merit of the Italian Republic, established in 1951 as the highest honour of the Italian Republic
- Order of Merit of the Federal Republic of Germany, established in 1951 as the highest honour of the Federal Republic of Germany
- Order of Merit of the Austrian Republic, established in 1952 as the highest honour of the Austrian Republic
- Order of Civil Merit of the Syrian Arab Republic, established in 1953
- Order of Merit (Egypt), established in 1953
- Ordre des Palmes Académiques, established in 1955 by the French Republic for excellence in education
- Order of Central African Merit, established in 1959 as the highest civil decoration of the Central African Republic
- Order of Merit (Sudan), established in 1961
- Order of Merit of the Grand Duchy of Luxembourg, established in 1961
- National Order of Merit (Mauritania), established in 1961
- Ordre national du Mérite (France), established in 1963
- Order of Merit (Jamaica), established in 1968
- Order of Ivory Merit, established in 1970
- National Order of Merit (Gabon), established in 1971
- Order of Merit (Cameroon), established in 1972
- Order of Merit (Malaysia), established in 1975 as the highest honour of Malaysia
- Order of Merit of the Republic of Poland, established in 1974
- National Order of Merit (Algeria), established in 1984
- Royal Norwegian Order of Merit, established in 1985
- National Order of Merit (Malta), established in 1990 as the highest honour of the Republic of Malta
- Order of Merit and Management, established in 1990
- Order of Merit of the Republic of Turkey, established in 1990
- Hungarian Order of Merit, established in 1991
- Order of Work Glory, established in 1992
- Order "For Merit to the Fatherland", established in 1994 for the Russian Federation
- Order of Merit (Ukraine), established in 1996
- Order of Merit of the Bahamas, established in 1996
- New Zealand Order of Merit, established in 1996
- Order of Merit (Antigua and Barbuda), established in 1998
- Order For Merit (Romania), a Romanian order, established in 2000
- Order of Merit of the Police Forces (Canada), established in 2000
- Order for Merits to Lithuania, established in 2002
- National Order of Merit (Bhutan), established in 2008
- Tuvalu Order of Merit was founded 2016 as the highest honour of Tuvalu
- Order of Honour (Greece)
- National Order of Merit (Guinea)
- National Order of Merit (Ecuador)
- Order of Civil Merit (France)
- Order of Civil Merit (South Korea)
- Pour le Mérite (1740–1918), the highest order of merit of the Kingdom of Prussia founded in 1740 by King Frederick II of Prussia
- Order of Saint Michael (Bavaria) (1693–1918), founded in 1693 by Archbishop-Elector Joseph Clemens of Bavaria of Cologne as a military order, from 1837 an order of merit of the Kingdom of Bavaria
- Indian Order of Merit (1837–1947), a military and civilian decoration of British India
- Order of Merit of Samoa (established 1992)

== List of dynastic orders of merit ==
- Order of Merit of Savoy, established in 1988 by the House of Savoy
- Order of Merit of the Portuguese Royal House, established in 1993 by the House of Braganza
- Royal Order of Merit of Prince Uchicho, established in 2012 by the House of Pinedo
- Order of the Taniwha, established in 2014 by the Māori Kīngitanga house of Te Wherowhero

== See also ==
- Cross of Merit (disambiguation), a number of separate decorations
- European Order of Merit
- Medal of Merit (disambiguation), a number of separate decorations
- Order (distinction)
- Order of Military Merit (disambiguation), a number of separate orders
- Order of Naval Merit (disambiguation), a number of separate orders
- Socialist orders of merit
