= Isabelle Rosabrunetto =

Monegasque diplomat

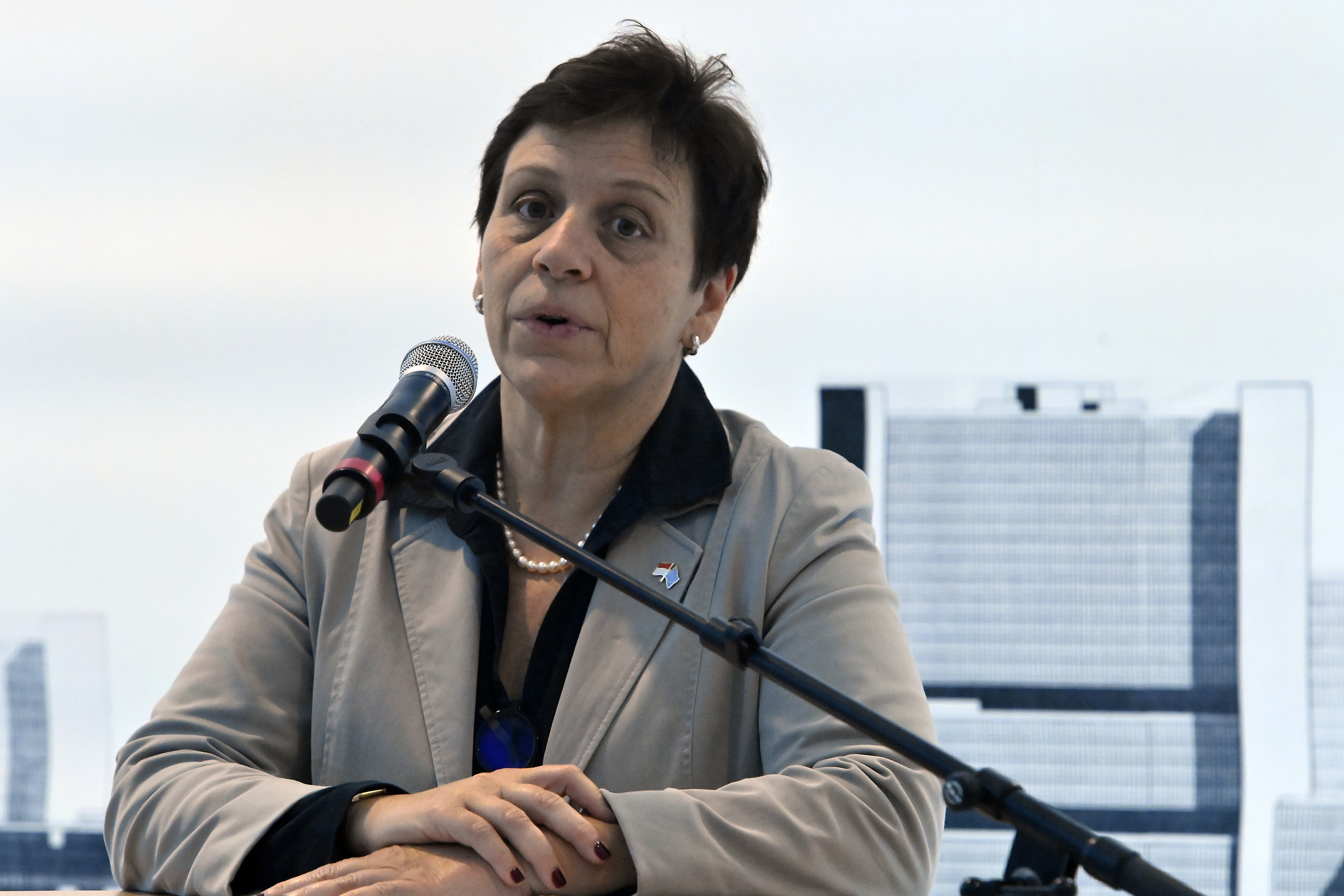
Isabelle Rosabrunetto, 2022

Isabelle Rosabrunetto is a Monegasque diplomat. As of 2015, she serves as Director General of the Ministry of Foreign Affairs and Cooperation of the Principality of Monaco.

She is Officer in the Order of Saint Charles (Monaco), Knight of the Order of National Merit (Mauritania), Knight of the french Order of merit and Officer of the Order of the Star of Italy.

== Career ==
In 1999, Rosabrunetto started to serve as Deputy Director of the Budget and Treasury Department of the Principality of Monaco and became Director in 2005. As of April 2015, she has been appointed as Director General of the Ministry of Foreign Affairs and Cooperation of the Principality of Monaco. During her service, she led Monegasque delegations to various foreign countries and multilateral organisations .
