= National Order of Merit =

National Order of Merit may refer to:

- National Order of Merit (Algeria)
- National Order of Merit (Bhutan)
- National Order of Merit (Brazil)
- National Order of Merit (Ecuador)
- Ordre national du Mérite (France)
- National Order of Merit (Gabon)
- National Order of Merit (Guinea)
- National Order of Merit (Malta)
- National Order of Merit (Mauritania)
- National Order of Merit (Paraguay)
- National Order of Merit (Romania)
- National Order of Merit (Tunisia)
- Order of Merit (Portugal)

== See also ==
- Order of merit (disambiguation)
