= Medal of Merit =

Medal of Merit is a military or civil medal. It may refer to:

- Australian Medal of Merit awarded by the Australian Division of the Legion of Frontiersmen
- Medal of Merit (Czech Republic)
- Medal of Merit (Denmark)
- Medal of Merit of the Dominican Woman
- Medal of Merit of the National People's Army (East Germany)
- Medal of Merit for Blood Donation, Luxembourg
- Medal of Merit of the Autonomous Region of Madeira
- Medal of Merit (Malta)
- Liakat Medal, Ottoman Empire
- Presidential Medal of Merit (Philippines)
- Medal of Merit for National Defence, Poland
- Medal of Merit to the People (Republika Srpska)
- Medal of Merit (Timor-Leste)

== Norway ==
- King's Medal of Merit
- Norwegian Army Medal of Merit
- Norwegian Air Force Medal of Merit
- Norwegian Navy Medal of Merit
- Norwegian Intelligence Service Medal of Merit
- Norwegian Home Guard Medal of Merit

== Spain ==
- Gold Medal of Merit in the Fine Arts, Spain
- Medal of Merit in Labour, Spain
- Medal of Merit in Research and University Education
- Medal of Philatelic Merit (Medal of Philatelic Merit)
- Medal of Merit for Radio Operators (Medal of Merit for Radio Operators)

== Sweden ==
- National Association of Volunteer Motor Transport Corps Medal of Merit
- Swedish Air Force Volunteers Association Medal of Merit
- Swedish Armed Forces Medal of Merit (since 2008)
- Swedish Armed Forces Medal of Merit (1995–2007)
- Swedish Civil Protection Association Medal of Merit
- Swedish Federation for Voluntary Defence Education and Training Medal of Merit
- Swedish Home Guard Medal of Merit
- Swedish Women's Voluntary Defence Organization Medal of Merit
- Swedish Women's Voluntary Defence Organization Royal Medal of Merit

== United States ==
- Charles Dick Medal of Merit, National Guard Association
- Congressional Medal of Merit, for young Americans
- Intelligence Medal of Merit, Central Intelligence Agency
- Medal for Merit, 1939–1952
- Texas Medal of Merit, by Texas Military Forces, within the United States Armed Forces
- Washington Medal of Merit

== See also ==
- Médaille militaire (France), a military decoration of the French Republic first established in 1852
- Medal for Military Merit (disambiguation)
- Order of Naval Merit (disambiguation)
- Order of merit (disambiguation)
