= Order of the Resistance =

Post-WWII civil decoration of the Luxembourg

Order of the Resistance 1940–1944 Ordre de la Résistance 1940–1944
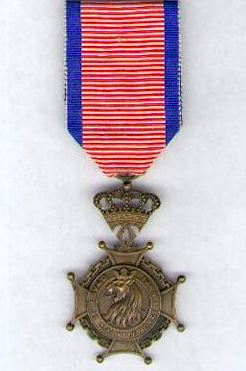
- Cross of the order

Awarded by Grand Duchy of Luxembourg
- Type: Single grade order of merit with medal
- Eligibility: Luxembourgers not in the military and in exceptional cases foreigners
- Awarded for: Distinguishing themselves, during German occupation, in service to the national cause, or by brilliant acts of resistance.
- Status: posthumously only after 2003
- Grades: Cross and medal

Precedence
- Next (higher): Bronze Cross of Honour and Military Merit
- Next (lower): 1914-18 Volunteers Medal
- Ribbon bar of the order

The Order of the Resistance 1940–1944 is a civil decoration of the Luxembourg. Established by Charlotte, Grand Duchess of Luxembourg by decree on March 30, 1946, the order recognizes civilians who, in the German occupation of Luxembourg during World War II, distinguished themselves particularly in the service of the national or allied cause, or by brilliant acts of resistance, courage, and dedication. Those recognized could be awarded a cross or a medal by the monarch of Luxembourg with the recommendation of the Prime Minister and the Council for the Remembrance of the Resistance. In 2003, it was determined that the cross could only be awarded posthumously and the medal would no longer be awarded.
