= General Breckenridge =

General Breckenridge may refer to:

- James Carson Breckinridge (1877–1942), U.S. Marine Corps lieutenant general
- James Breckinridge (1763–1833), U.S. Army brigadier general
- John C. Breckinridge (1821–1875), Confederate States Army major general
- Joseph Cabell Breckinridge Sr. (1842–1920), U.S. Army brigadier general
