= Order of Civil Merit (disambiguation) =

The Order of Civil Merit is a knighthood and state order currently awarded by the Kingdom of Spain to reward exceptional services by Spaniards and foreigners for the benefit of the nation.

Order of Civil Merit may also refer to:

- Order of Civil Merit (South Korea) - Status: Currently awarded
- Order of Civil Merit (Bulgaria) - Status: Currently awarded only to Bulgarian citizens
- Order of Civil Merit (France) - Status: Deprecated

== See also ==
- Order of merit (disambiguation)
- Order of Civic Merit of Laos
- Order of Civil Merit of the Syrian Arab Republic
