= Order of Naval Merit =

Order of Naval Merit may refer to:

- Order of Naval Merit (Brazil)
- Order of Naval Merit (Cuba)
- Order of Naval Merit (Dominican Republic)
- Order of Naval Merit (Russia)
- Order of Naval Merit (Spain)

== See also ==
- Order of merit (disambiguation), a number of separate orders
- Order of Military Merit (disambiguation), a number of separate orders
- Cross of Merit (disambiguation), a number of separate decorations
- Medal of Merit (disambiguation), a number of separate decorations
