= Yin T. Hsieh =

Taiwanese scientist and agronomist (1929–2018)

- 謝英鐸
- Born: Yin T. Hieh; April 14, 1929; Pingtung, Taiwan
- Died: February 24, 2018 (aged 88)
- Citizenship: Taiwanese-Dominican
- Education: National Taiwan University; Texas A&M University
- Known for: Father of the Dominican rice. Development of several rice varieties in Taiwan and Dominican Republic
- Awards: Order of Christopher Columbus (1982)
- Scientific career
- Fields: Agronomy
- Workplaces: Kaohsiung District Agricultural Research and Extension Station, Taiwan. Estación Experimental Juma, Dominican Republic
- Thesis: 關於菸草腋芽之抑制試驗(Bachelor) (1952)

Yin T. Hsieh (Traditional Chinese: 謝英鐸; 14 April 1929 – 24 February 2018) was a Taiwanese scientist and agronomist based in the Dominican Republic.

== Contributions ==
Hsieh is considered the "Father of Dominican Rice" for his work on the development of several rice varieties and technologies .

In Taiwan, Doctor Hsieh worked in the development of several rice varieties, including Kaohsiung 22, Kaohsiung 24, Kaohsiung 25, Kaohsiung 27, Kaohsiung 53, Kaohsiung 64, Kaohsiung 136, y Kaohsiung 137.

Hsieh Arrived to the Dominican Republic on December 29, 1965. He focused efforts in genetic improvement of Dominican rice helping to increase the country yield production of the crop. Due to these, and other, efforts, the country now has a strong and well developed rice production system
