= Order of Air Merit =

Order of Air Merit Orden del Mérito Aéreo
- Type: Three division military merit order with four classes
- Awarded for: Extraordinary services and merit.
- Country: Dominican Republic
- Eligibility: Members of the Air Force of the Dominican Republic.
- Post-nominals: M.A.
- Motto: Courage and Loyalty
- Established: 3 August 1952
- Ribbon bar for combat division Ribbon bar for long service division Ribbon bar for other services division

Precedence
- Next (higher): Order of Military Merit
- Next (lower): Order of Police Merit

The Order of Air Merit is an honour awarded to members of the Dominican Air Force. It was established on 3 August 1952.

The Order is in three divisions:

1. Awarded for combat or war service. Displayed on a red ribbon
2. Awarded for long and faithful service. Displayed on a blue ribbon
3. Awarded for other service. Displayed on a white ribbon

Within each division, the award is made in one of four classes:

- First Class: to General Officers.
- Second Class: to Superior Officers.
- Third Class: to Junior Officers.
- Fourth Class: to Non-Commissioned Officers.

The motto of the order is Courage and Loyalty.

== Post-Nominal ==
The person awarded with this honour should be added the post-nominal M. A. (Mérito Aéreo, Spanish for Air Merit) after his or her full name, in all the official papers and documents.

== See also ==
- Orders, decorations, and medals of the Dominican Republic
