= Patrick F. Cassidy =

United States Army general

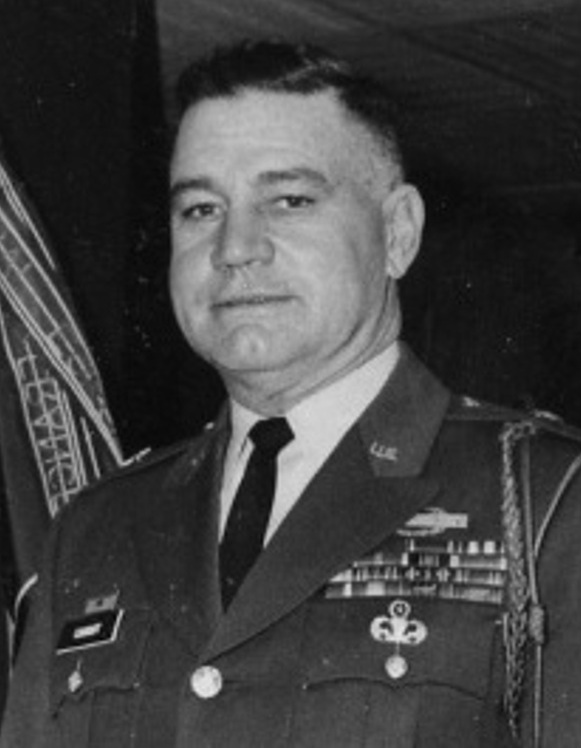
- Cassidy as a brigadier general in 1964
- Born: 22 March 1915; Pendleton, Oregon
- Died: 5 January 1990 (aged 74); San Antonio, Texas
- Burial place: Fort Sam Houston National Cemetery
- Military career
- Allegiance: United States of America
- Branch: United States Army
- Service years: 1940–1973
- Rank: Lieutenant general
- Nickname: Hopalong
- Commands: Fifth United States Army; I Corps; 8th Infantry Division; XVIII Airborne Corps; 1st Battalion, 502nd Parachute Infantry Regiment
- Conflicts: World War II
- Awards: Distinguished Service Cross; Military Medal (Luxembourg)

Patrick Francis Cassidy (22 March 1915 – 5 January 1990) was a United States Army officer who served in World War II.

== Military career ==
While serving as commander of 1st Battalion, 502nd Parachute Infantry Regiment in the Battle of Carentan, Lieutenant Colonel Cassidy was awarded the Distinguished Service Cross. During the Battle of Bastogne, he served as executive officer of the 502nd Parachute Infantry Regiment.

In 1963, Brigadier general Cassidy commanded XVIII Airborne Corps.

Major general Cassidy commanded the 8th Infantry Division from April 1966 to June 1968. In August 1967, he was awarded the Military Medal, Luxembourg's highest military honor.

He served as Chief of Personnel Operations from February 1968 to June 1969.

Lieutenant general Cassidy served as commander of I Corps from 8 August 1969 to 26 July 1970.

In October 1971, he was appointed commander of Fifth United States Army.

In January 1973, he acted as commander of escorts for the memorial service for former President Harry S. Truman at Washington National Cathedral.
