= Order of Christopher Columbus =

Honor of the Dominican Republic

Order of Christopher Columbus Orden Heráldica de Cristóbal Colón
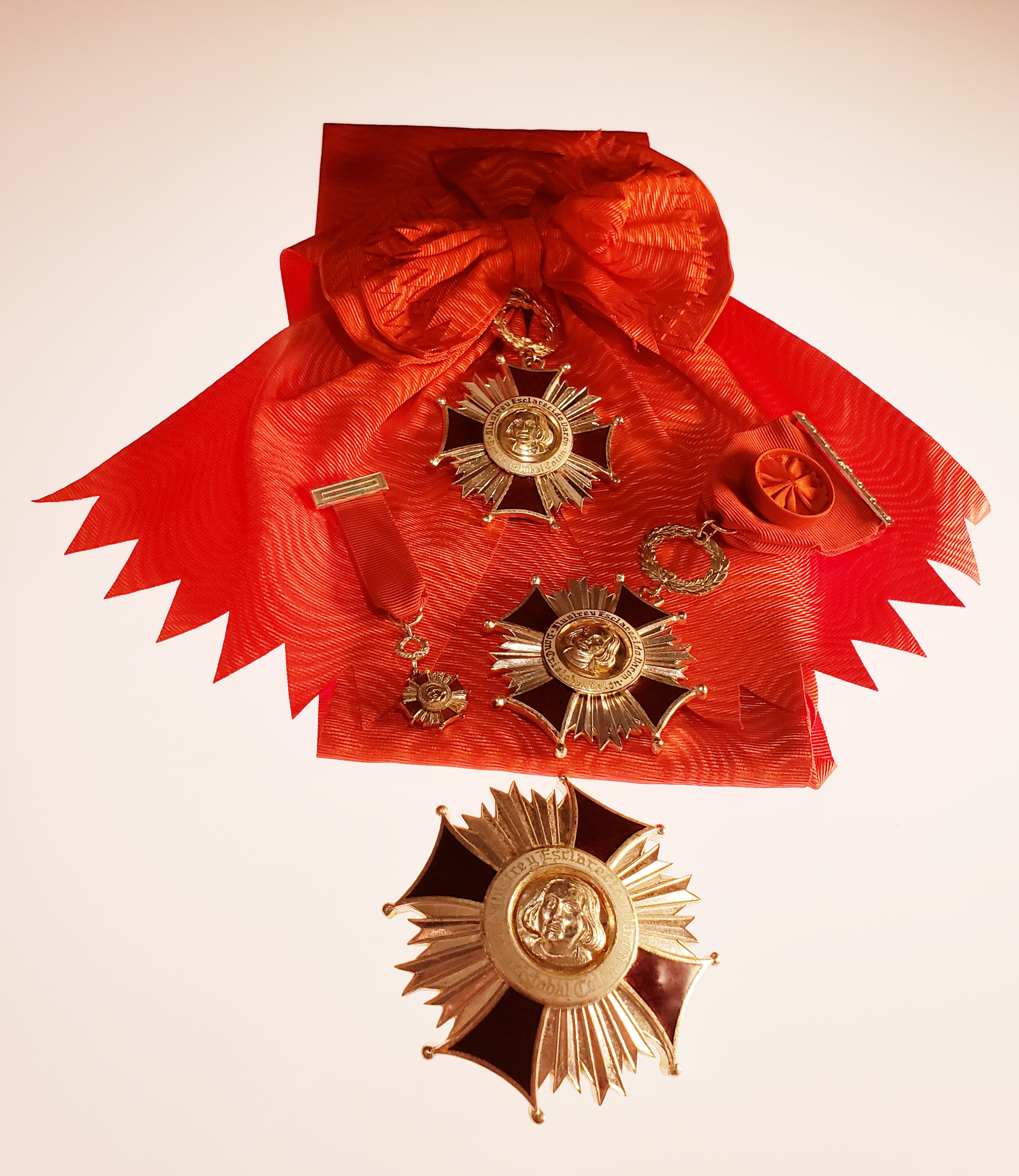

Awarded by Dominican Republic
- Type: Order
- Eligibility: Dominican and foreigners, both civilians and military
- Awarded for: Facts and meritorious work that relate to the glory of the discoverer of America, with their remains, or the monumental Lighthouse that was erected to his memory on the coast of Santo Domingo, and the distinguished service to the nation or humanity and merit outstanding in the arts or sciences.
- Status: Currently constituted
- Sovereign: President Luis Abinader
- Grades: Collar; Grand Cross with Gold Breast Star; Grand Cross with Silver Breast Star; Grand Officer; Commander; Officer; Knight

Precedence
- Next (higher): Order of Merit of Duarte, Sánchez and Mella
- Next (lower): Order of Military Heroism Captain General Santana
- Ribbon bar of the Order of Christopher Columbus

The Order of Christopher Columbus (Spanish: Orden Heráldica de Cristóbal Colón) is an order of the Dominican Republic. It was established on 21 July 1937. The Head of State confers the order, by advice of the council of the order, both to civilians and military personnel to recognize services.

This order honors the life and works of Christopher Columbus firstly and secondly recognize services to the Dominican Republic or humanitarian services and distinction in the arts and sciences.

There is a council of the order consisting of ten members. The Minister of Foreign Affairs of the Dominican Republic is an ex oficio member and president of the council. The members of the council are awarded with the fourth grade of the order (Grand Officer).

== Division of the Order ==
The order is divided in seven grades:

- Collar is awarded to the President of the Republic
- Grand Cross with Gold Breast Star is awarded to foreign heads of state and to former presidents and vice presidents
- Grand Cross with Silver Breast Star is awarded to members of legislatures and the supreme court, ministers of state, ambassadors and the metropolitan archbishop
- Grand Officer is awarded to service chiefs and high officials of government and church
- Commander is awarded to governors of provinces, directors general of instruction, directors of academies, deans of universities, authors and others of similar importance
- Officer is awarded to professors and heads of schools, officers of the rank of colonel and above and civilians of equal importance
- Knight is award to others

== Accoutrements ==
The collar of the Order will be solid, of 18 carat gold, formed in four parts, consisting of a laurel's coronet and of Christopher Columbus´s bust; in the center of the collar will have (of a large size and enameled in natural colors) the Coat of Arms of the Republic, which above will be adorned with fifteen brilliant. Below, will suspended the order's badge. The laurel's coronet, the coat of arms and the badge will be adorned with precious stones.

The badge of the order has precedence before other orders' badges except the badges of the Order of Merit of Duarte, Sánchez and Mella and the Order of Military Merit.

== Recipients ==
- Rear Admiral Richard E. Byrd, Jr.
- Fredrick Chien, Vice Minister of Foreign Affairs, Republic of China
- Cristóbal Colón de Carvajal, 17th Duke of Veragua
- Yin T. Hsieh, Taiwanese agronomist
