= Medal for Military Merit =

Medal for Military Merit may refer to:

- Medal of Military Merit (Greece) (Greek: Μετάλλιο Στρατιωτικής Αξίας), a military decoration of Greece
- Medal "For Battle Merit" (Russian: Медаль "За боевые заслуги"; Ukrainian: Медаль "За бойові заслуги"), a Soviet military medal
- Medal for Military Merit (Republika Srpska) (Serbian: Медаља за војне заслуге, romanized: Medalja za vojne zasluge), a Republika Srpska medal
- Medal of Military Merit (Uruguay)
- Medal for Military Merit (Yugoslavia) (Serbo-Croatian: Медаља за војне заслуге / Medalja za vojne zasluge), a Yugoslav medal
- Meritorious Service Medal (Belgium)

== See also ==
- Medal of Merit (disambiguation)
