= Order pro Merito Melitensi =

Order of merit of the Sovereign Military Order of Malta

- Cross of the order

Awarded by Sovereign Military Order of Malta
- Type: Order of merit
- Established: 1920
- Status: Currently constituted
- Grades: Collar; Grand Cross, Special Class; Grand Cross; Grand Officer; Commander; Officer; Cross

Precedence
- Next (higher): Order of Saint John
- Military ribbon Civil ribbon

The Order of Merit (Italian: Ordine di Merito; Latin: Ordo pro Merito Melitensi) is the order of merit of the Sovereign Military Order of Malta, established in 1920. It is awarded to recipients who have brought honour to the Sovereign Military Order of Malta, promoted Christian values and for charity as defined by the Roman Catholic Church. Unlike Knights or Dames of the Order of Malta (which is a military order of chivalry), those decorated with the Order are not invested in a religious ceremony, do not swear any oath or make any religious commitment. It may therefore be bestowed upon non-Catholics. Conferees include prominent statesmen, such as Presidents Ronald Reagan, who received it while still in office, and George H. W. Bush.

Its grades are grouped in three categories: the Collar, the Cross, and the Medals, including Commander at the Cross level, now rare in the Order of Malta, and has no nobiliary grades, thus being comparable to numerous orders of merit around the world, including the Papal orders, France's Order of National Merit and Britain's Order of the British Empire.

The medals are inscribed with the abbreviated Latin: Militaris Ordo Equitum Melitensum Bene Merenti, which translates roughly as Military Order Knight of Merit Well Deserved. By the medieval period both milites (from which derives the word militaris) and equites are terms for knights, even though the original distinction was foot soldiers and cavalry respectively.

== Order pro Merito Melitensi ==
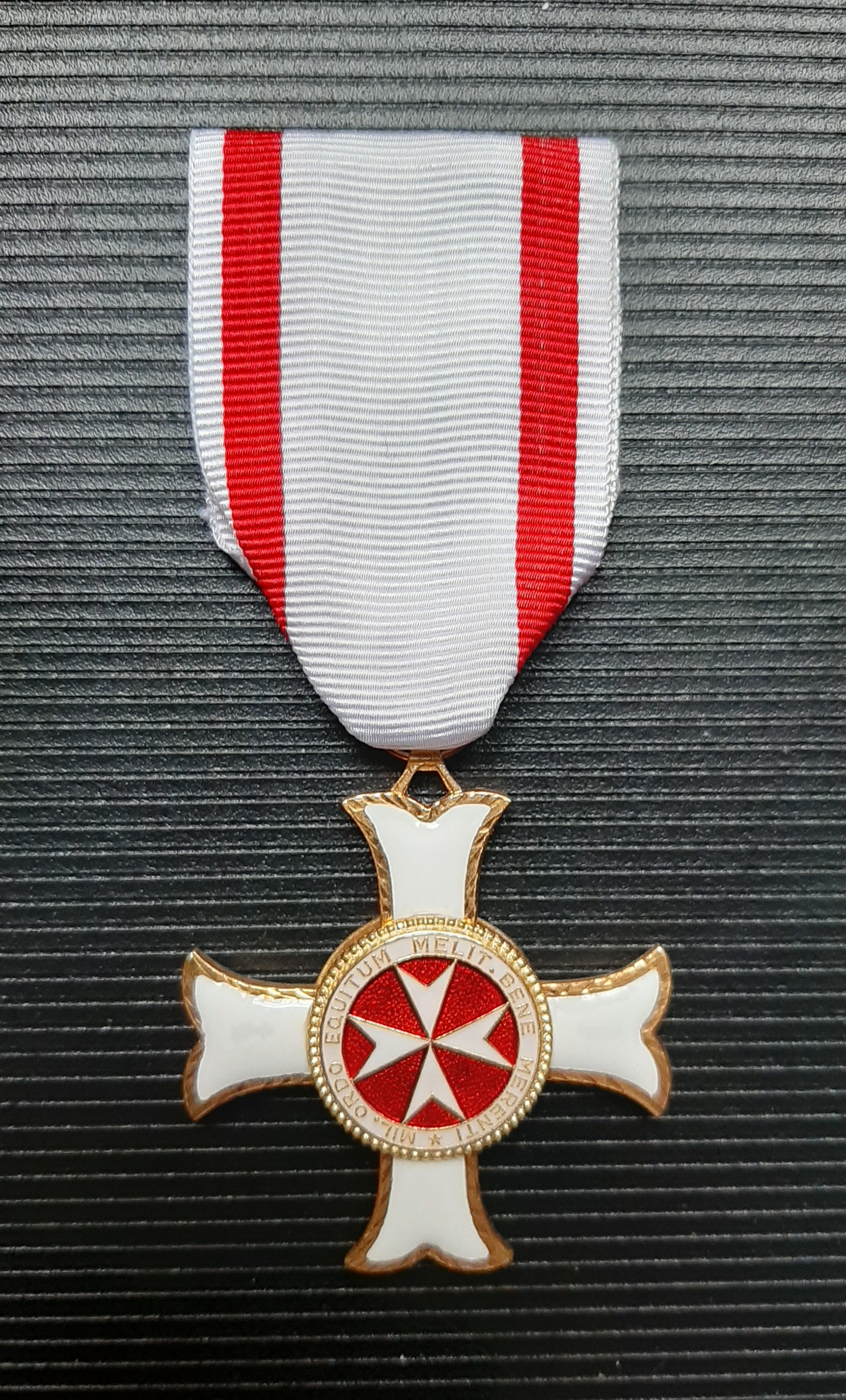
Cross pro Merito Melitensi

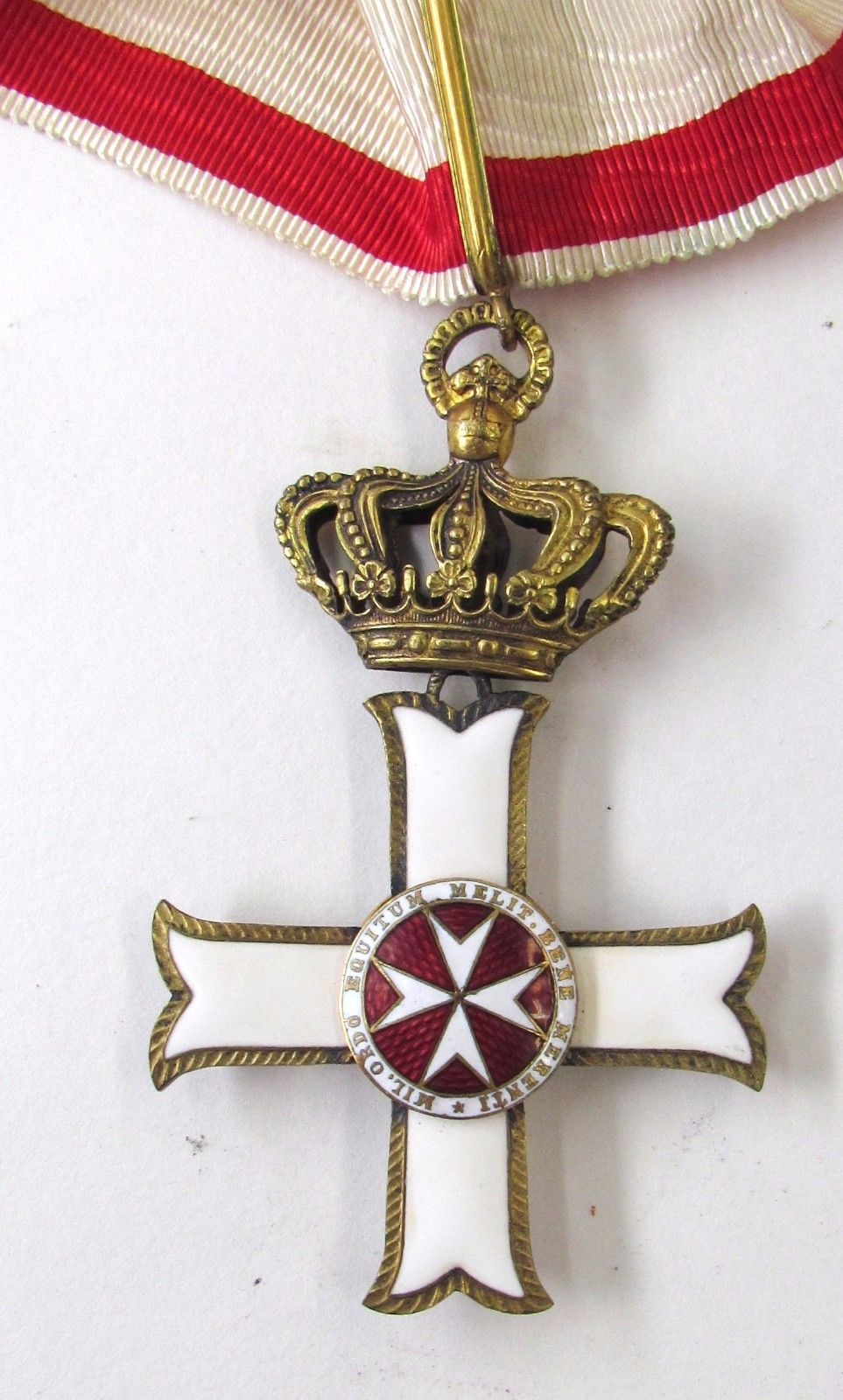
Commander pro Merito Melitensi neck decoration

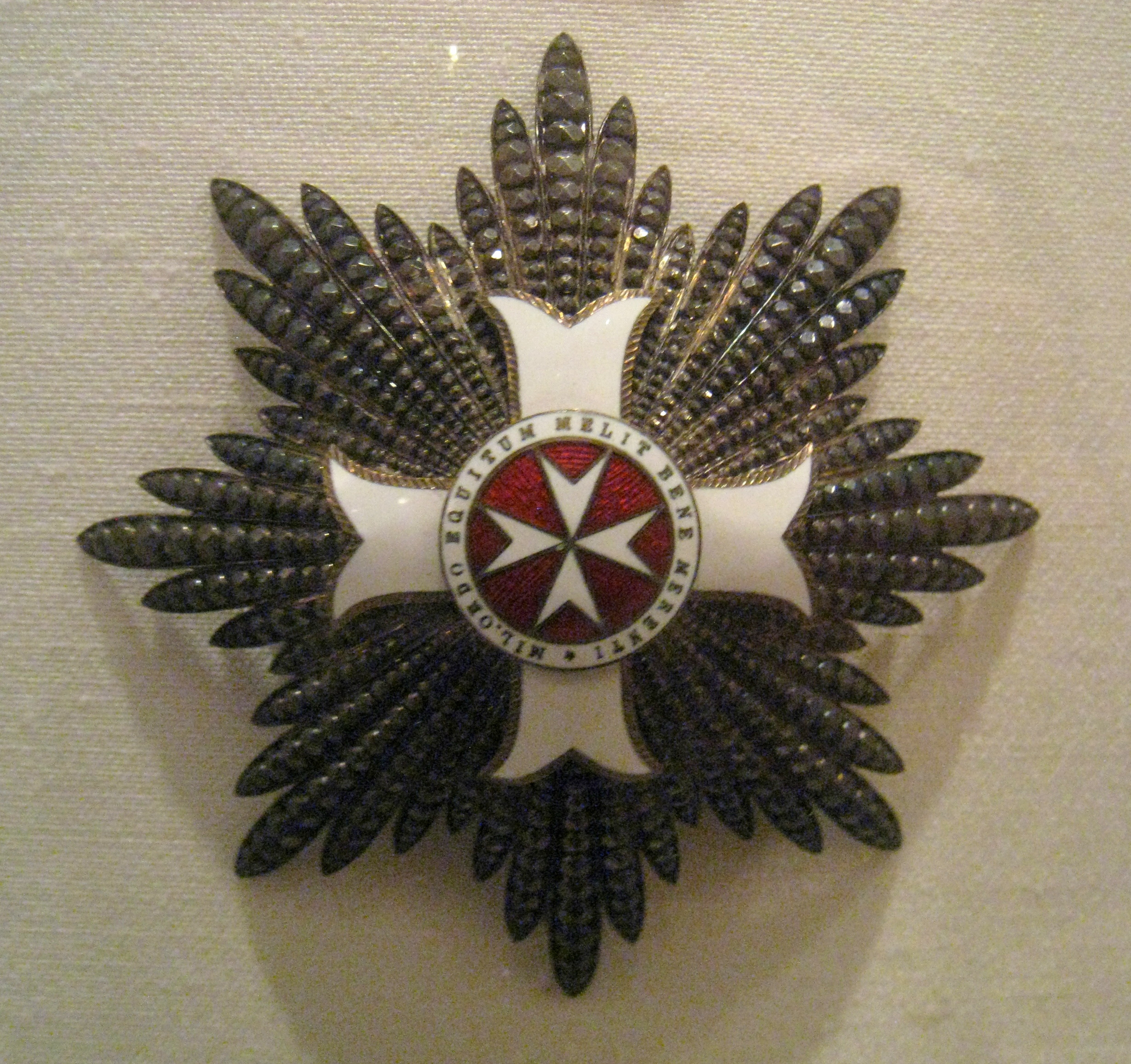
Grand Cross pro Merito Melitensi breast star

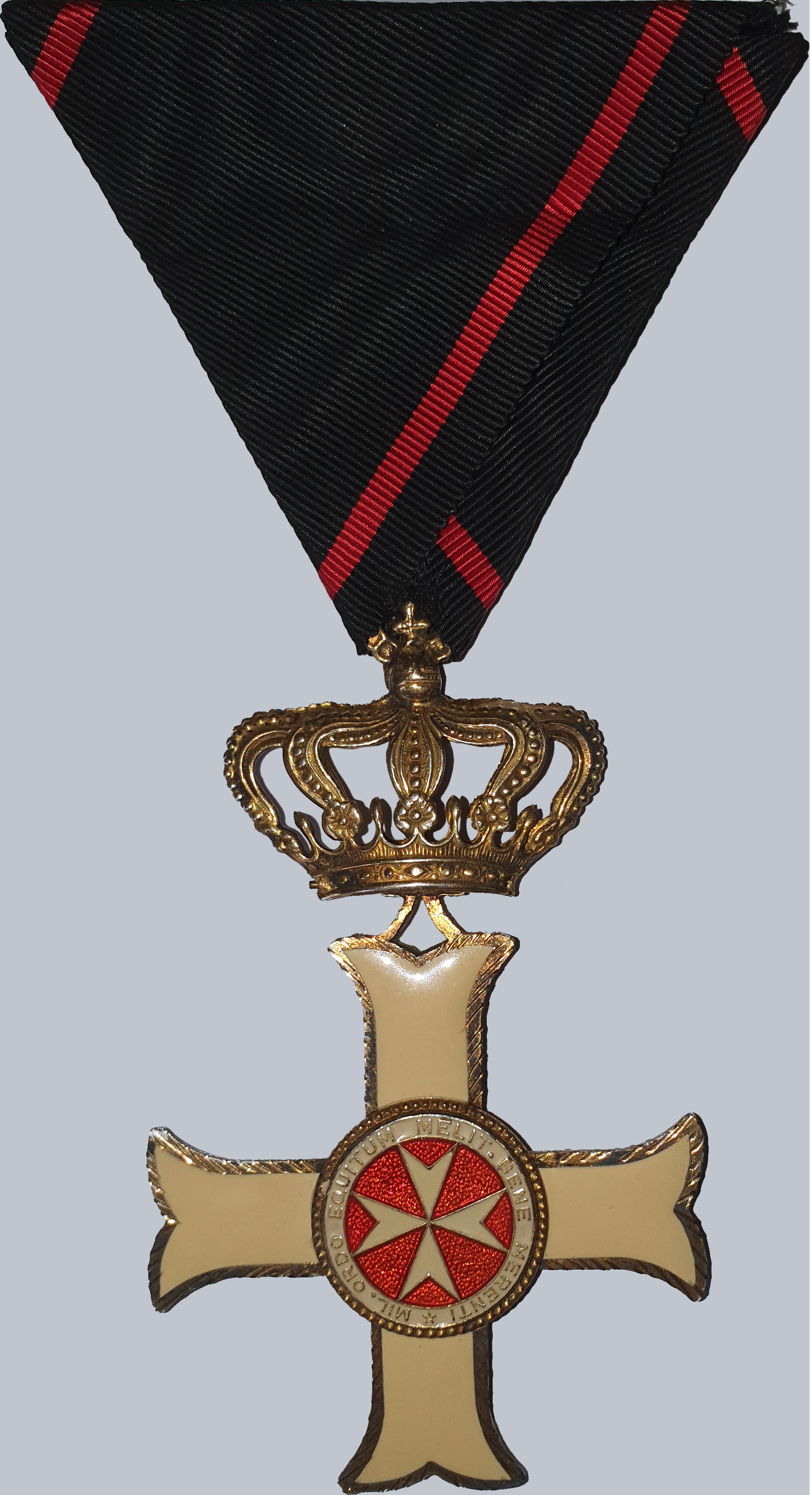
Cross Pro piis meritis Pro merito melitensi

=== Collar of the Order pro Merito Melitensi ===
Pro Merito Melitensi Collar – Military Class
Pro Merito Melitensi Collar – Civilian Class
Single grade, usually bestowed to Heads of State only.

=== Cross of the Order pro Merito Melitensi ===
==== Military Class ====
Grand Cross with Swords pro Merito Melitensi – Special Class
Grand Cross with Swords pro Merito Melitensi
Grand Officer Cross with Swords pro Merito Melitensi
Commander Cross with Swords pro Merito Melitensi
Officer Cross with Swords pro Merito Melitensi
Cross with Swords pro Merito Melitensi

==== Civilian Class ====
Grand Cross pro Merito Melitensi – Special Class
Grand Cross pro Merito Melitensi
Grand Officer Cross pro Merito Melitensi
Commander Cross pro Merito Melitensi
Officer Cross pro Merito Melitensi
Cross pro Merito Melitensi

==== Ecclesiastics Class ====
Grand Cross pro Piis Meritis Melitensi
Cross pro Piis Meritis Melitensi

=== Medal of the Order pro Merito Melitensi ===
==== Old style (1920–1960) ====
Gold Medal pro Merito Melitensi
Silver Medal pro Merito Melitensi
Bronze Medal pro Merito Melitensi

==== Military Class ====
Gold Medal with Swords pro Merito Melitensi
Silver Medal with Swords pro Merito Melitensi
Bronze Medal with Swords pro Merito Melitensi

==== Civilian Class ====
Gold Medal pro Merito Melitensi
Silver Medal pro Merito Melitensi
Bronze Medal pro Merito Melitensi

== The Order pro Merito Melitensi ==
=== Classes of the Order pro Merito Melitensi ===
The Order pro Merito Melitensi comprises the following classes:

- Collar
- Cross
- Medal

=== The Collar pro Merito Melitensi ===
The Collar only has a single grade, but is separated into two divisions, namely "Collar pro Merito Melitensi" for Civilians and "Collar with Swords pro Merito Melitensi" for the Military. The Collar is only awarded to Heads of State.

=== The Cross pro Merito Melitensi ===
The Cross is bestowed upon both civilians and military personnel, comprising several grades:

- Grand Cross pro Merito Melitensi – Special Class
- Grand Cross pro Merito Melitensi
- Grand Officer pro Merito Melitensi (with Badge for women)
- Commander pro Merito Melitensi (with Crown for women)
- Officer pro Merito Melitensi (with Coat of arms for women)
- Cross pro Merito Melitensi

N.B: these decorations are "with Swords" for serving military and "without Swords" for civilians.

=== The Cross "pro piis meritis" pro Merito Melitensi ===
When awarded to ecclesiastics, it has the same cross as awarded to civilians and military personnel. Nevertheless, this ribbon is black crossed with two thin red lines and comprises only two grades :

- Grand Cross "pro piis meritis" pro Merito Melitensi,
- Cross "pro piis meritis" pro Merito Melitensi.

=== The Medal pro Merito Melitensi ===
This class has three grades: Gold, Silver and Bronze. The Gold, Silver, and Bronze Medals (including the corresponding grades with Swords) are grades of the Order within the Medal category and are not external decorations.

=== Ribbons ===
There are only three different types of ribbons for both the medal and the crosses.

| Cross of Merit, Ecclesiastical | Cross of Merit, Civil | Cross of Merit, Military |
Ribbon
| Black ribbon with thin red stripes | White ribbon with large red stripes | Red ribbon with large white stripes |

== See also ==
- Sovereign Military Order of Malta
