= Order of Honor =

Order of Honor may refer to:

- Order of Honour (Armenia)
- Order of Honor (Belarus), established in 1995
- Order of Honor (Georgia)
- Order of Honour (Greece), an award that replaced the abolished Royal Order of George I in 1975
- Order of Honour (Moldova)
- Order of Honour (Oman)
- Order of Honor (Republika Srpska)
- Order of Honour (Russia), established in 1994 after the dissolution of the Soviet Union
- Order of Kurmet, a decoration of Kazakhstan established in 1993
- Order of the Badge of Honour, a Soviet decoration awarded between 1935 and 1988
- Order of Honour, a Soviet decoration awarded between 1988 and 1994

== See also ==
- Order of merit
