= James Carson Breckinridge =

US Marine Corps general (1877–1942)

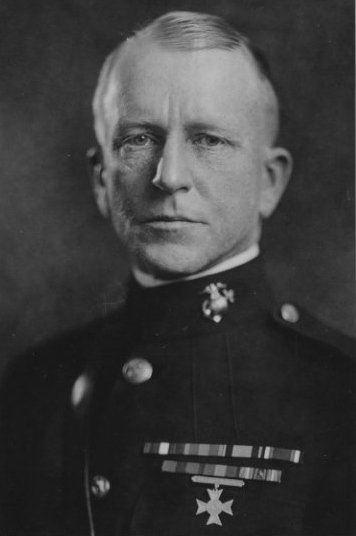
- Breckinridge as a Major General, circa 1935
- Born: October 13, 1877; Memphis, Tennessee, U.S.
- Died: March 2, 1942 (aged 64); Summit Point, West Virginia, U.S.
- Burial place: Lexington Cemetery
- Relatives: Dorothy Throckmorton Thomson, John C. Breckinridge
- Military career
- Allegiance: United States of America
- Branch: United States Marine Corps
- Service years: April 13, 1899 to October 1, 1941
- Rank: Lieutenant General
- Commands: Department of the Pacific; Marine Base Parris Island
- Conflicts: Spanish–American War: Philippines Campaign; Banana Wars: Occupation of Nicraragua; Occupation of the Dominican Republic; Mexican Revolution: Battle of Veracruz; World War I
- Awards: Navy Cross; Order of Military Merit (Dominican Republic)

James Carson Breckinridge (September 13, 1877 – March 2, 1942) was a lieutenant general of the United States Marine Corps. He was the son of Clifton Rhodes Breckinridge and grandson of Vice President and Confederate Major General John C. Breckinridge. He was a member of the prominent Breckinridge family.

== Military career ==
Breckinridge attended the University of Tennessee in 1897 and 1898. He was appointed as a second lieutenant in the Marine Corps in 1899 to fight in the Spanish–American War, seeing service at Cavite in the Philippines. He was promoted to captain on July 23, 1901, serving as the commander of Marine detachments at sea through that decade. He served ashore in Panama and Nicaragua from late 1909 to early 1911, months later, temporary expeditionary duty in Cuba. In April 1914, he participated in the United States occupation of Veracruz while in command of the Marine detachment from the USS Utah. He received a commendation for his conduct in battle.

Breckinridge served during World War I as naval attaché at many diplomatic posts from April 1916 to September 1918, to include Petrograd, Russia, Christiania, Norway, Copenhagen, Denmark, and Stockholm, Sweden. His service would earn him the Navy Cross, for "distinguished service in the line of his profession as Naval Attache to the American Legations at Christiana and Stockholm, and for a time also at Copenhagen. At all of these posts of duty, the service of information established and conducted was of great value to the United States and allied Powers." He was promoted to major on June 12, 1916, to lieutenant colonel two months later, and to colonel on July 1, 1918.

From February 1919 to October 1920, he commanded the 15th Regiment, 2nd Brigade of Marines, in the occupation of the Dominican Republic, and from October 4, 1920 to May 5, 1921, was in command of the Guardia Nacional Dominicana, and he received the Dominican Republic's Order of Military Merit. In 1922, he returned to the United States to attend the Army War College, then commanded Marine Barracks, Washington, D.C. from August 1923 to September 1925.

From 1925 to 1927, Breckinridge was attached to the USS Seattle as Fleet Marine Officer and aide on the Staff of the Commander in Chief, United States Fleet. He next served as chief of staff for, and later commanded the 1st Marine Regiment at Marine Barracks, Quantico, Virginia from December 1, 1927 to December 25, 1929. In July 1928, he was placed in command of the Marine Corps Schools at Quantico.

From January 28, 1930 until March 13, 1932, Breckinridge commanded the Marine Detachment at the American Legation, Peiping, China, and was promoted to brigadier general on October 31, 1931. Following this, he returned to Quantico to command Marine Corps Schools again until January 6, 1935, having been promoted to major general on February 1, 1935. He was ordered to San Francisco, California, to assume command of the Department of the Pacific until June 24, 1937, when he again returned to Quantico as commander until September 1939. He then commanded Marine Barracks, Parris Island, South Carolina until his retirement effective October 1, 1941, having attained the statutory retiring age of 64 years. He received a promotion to lieutenant general at that date in recognition of his decorated service as a combat veteran.

== Retirement and death ==
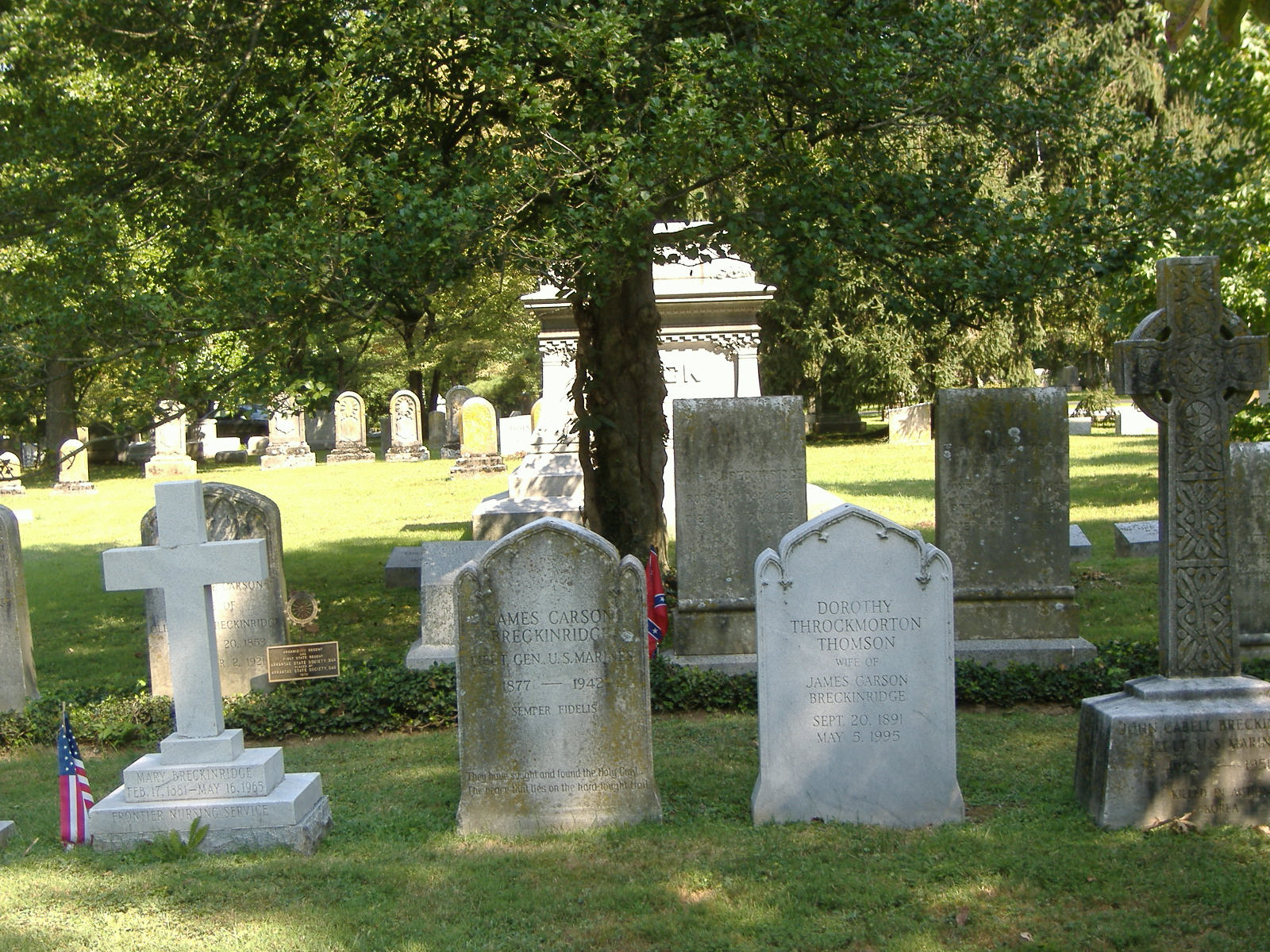
Breckinridge's gravesite; his grandfather John C. Breckinridge is behind him

He retired on October 1, 1941, and returned to his home in the Shenandoah Valley. After his death, according to his wishes, he was buried in the Breckinridge family plot at Lexington Cemetery in Lexington, Kentucky.

== Awards and honors ==

Navy Cross	Marine Corps Expeditionary Medal	Spanish Campaign Medal	Philippine Campaign Medal
Cuban Pacification Medal	Mexican Service Medal	World War I Victory Medal	American Defense Service Medal

The USS General J. C. Breckinridge (AP-176) and the James Carson Breckinridge Professional Library at the Marine Corps University is named for him, as a tribute for his efforts to prepare the next generation of Marines for World War II.
