= Order of Merit of Duarte, Sánchez and Mella =

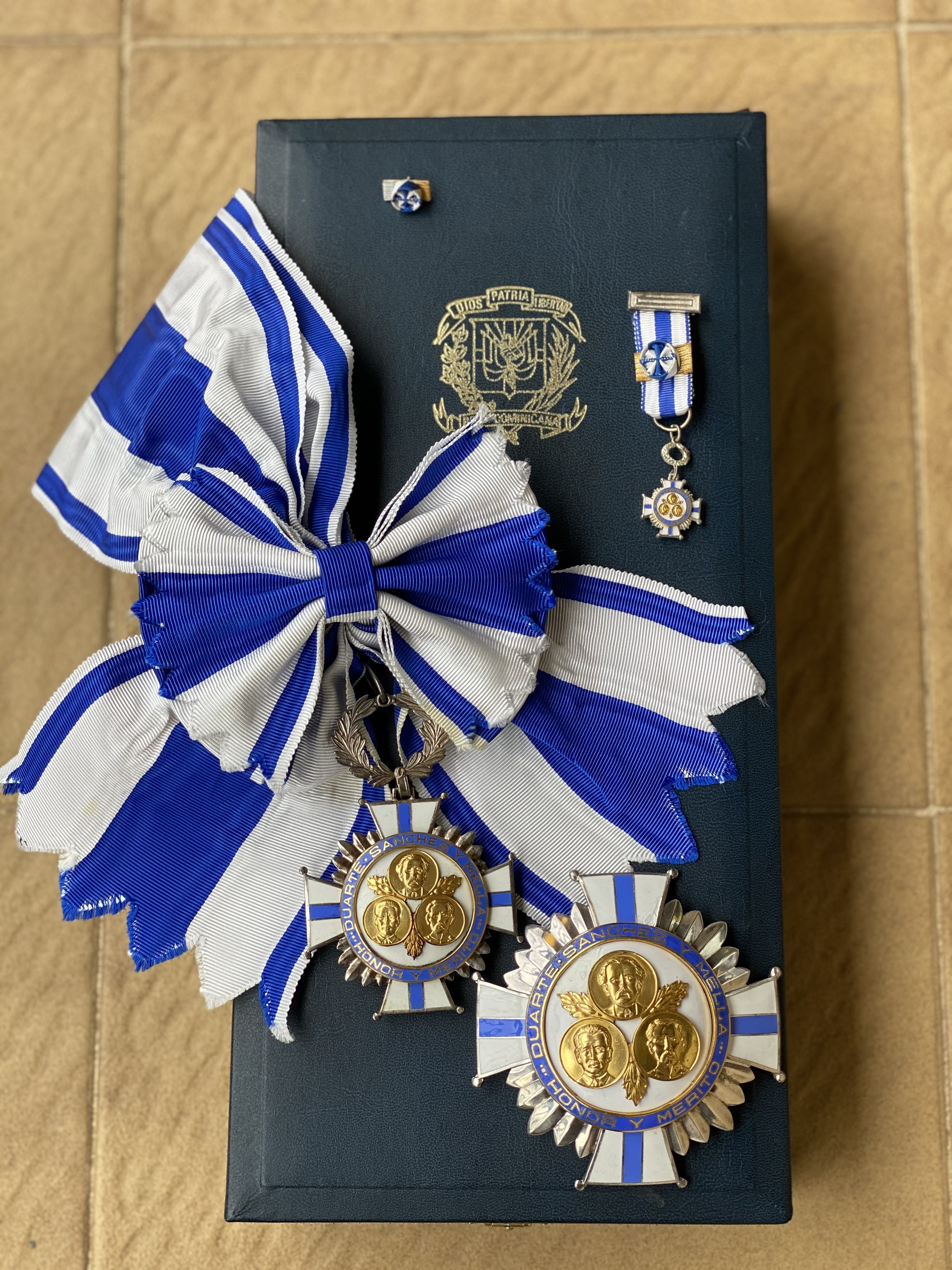
- Grand Cross silver star set of the Order
- Type: seven grade order
- Awarded for: Distinguished services to the Dominican Republic
- Country: Dominican Republic
- Presented by: Head of State of the Dominican Republic
- Eligibility: Military and Civilian
- Established: 9 September 1954
- Ribbon bar

Precedence
- Next (higher): None
- Next (lower): Order of Christopher Columbus

The Order of Merit of Duarte, Sánchez and Mella (Orden al Mérito de Duarte, Sánchez y Mella) is the principal order of the Dominican Republic. It was established on 24 February 1931 as the Juan Pablo Duarte Order of Merit (Orden al Mérito Juan Pablo Duarte) and renamed on 9 September 1954. The Head of State confers the order both to civilians and military personnel for distinguished services.

== Division of the Order ==
The order is divided in seven grades:

- Collar is awarded to the President of the Republic
- Grand Cross with Gold Breast Star is awarded for foreign chiefs of state and to former presidents and vice presidents
- Grand Cross with Silver Breast Star is awarded to members of legislatures and supreme court, ministers of state, ambassadors and the metropolitan archbishop
- Grand Officer is awarded to service chiefs and high officials of government and church
- Commander is awarded to governors of provinces, directors general of instruction, directors of academies, dean of universities, authors and others of similar importance
- Officer is awarded to professors and heads of schools, officers of the rank of colonel and above and civilians of equal importance
- Knight is awarded to others

== Accoutrements ==
The collar of the Order will be solid, of platinum and gold, formed for various parts, compound each one of a laurel's coronet and of the Duarte, Sánchez and Mella's bust; in the center of the collar will have (in a big size and enameled in natural colors) the Coat of Arms of the Republic, which above will be adorned with twelve brilliant. Below, will suspended the order's badge. The laurel's coronet, the coat of arms and the badge will be adorned with precious stones.
