= Luxembourg War Cross =

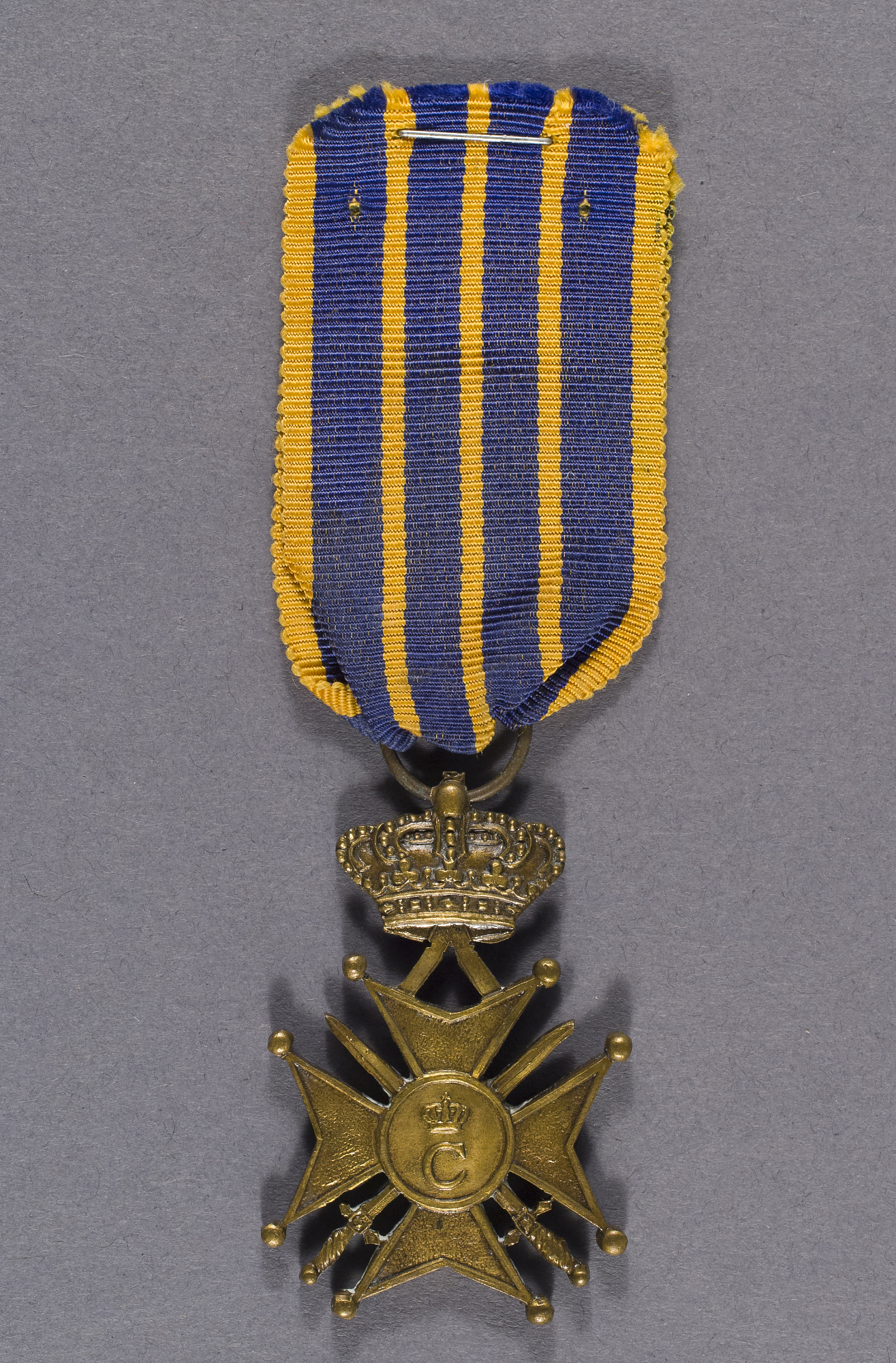
- Luxembourg War Cross
- Type: Military decoration
- Awarded for: Distinguished acts of courage and bravery
- Presented by: Luxembourg
- Status: Not currently awarded
- Established: 17 April 1945
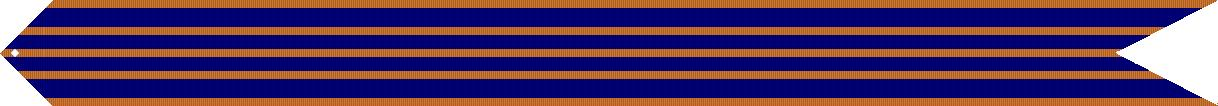
- Luxembourg War Cross ribbon bar Luxembourg War Cross Unit award Unit award streamer

Precedence
- Next (higher): Cross of Honour and Military Merit
- Equivalent: Luxembourg War Cross (1951)

The Luxembourg War Cross (French: Croix de Guerre, German: Kriegskreuz) is a military decoration of Luxembourg. It was created on 17 April 1945 by the Grand Duchess Charlotte of Luxembourg. The War Cross recognizes military service and feats of bravery. The medal is often referred to as the Luxembourg Croix de Guerre (French for War Cross) as French is one of Luxembourg's three official languages.

Luxembourg bestowed the War Cross on both Luxembourg citizens and members of the Allied Forces for acts of particular bravery or valor during the Liberation of Luxembourg. The War Cross could also be awarded to military units. The Luxembourg War Cross was one of the rarest foreign decorations bestowed on allied troops due to the small number of combat operations that took place in Luxembourg—in contrast to major fighting in places like Belgium, France, and Germany.

== War Cross 1940–1945 ==
The War Cross 1940–1945 was established in April 1945 by Grand Duchess Charlotte of Luxembourg. This decoration was awarded to members of the armed forces and paramilitary organizations who rendered distinguished service during World War II. Foreigners were also eligible for award.

The medal is a dark bronze cross in the Cross pattée design. The cross is surmounted by a grand ducal crown. On the obverse side it has a large letter C surmounted by a crown. The reverse side of it has the date 1940. The cross has crossed swords between the arms of the cross pointing upward, also made of the dark bronze. The ribbon of the War Cross is Nassau blue, with three stripes of yellow-orange spaced equally from the center. The edges are also yellow-orange.

== War Cross 1951 ==
The War Cross 1951 was instituted in May 1951. This decoration is awarded to those members of Military of Luxembourg and paramilitary organizations who have distinguished themselves through acts of bravery and courage. It may be awarded posthumously. The decoration may also be awarded to foreigners. The War Cross 1951 was established to allow the government of Luxembourg to recognize service in the Korean War, as well as in future conflicts.

The War Cross 1951 appears exactly as the War Cross 1940–1945, with the exception of the reverse. Instead of bearing the date 1940, that space is occupied by a wreath of oak leaves.

== United States military unit awards ==
The United States Military allows members of those units which have been awarded the decoration wear the blue and yellow-orange ribbon, enclosed within a gold frame. This represents the unit's receipt of the award as a streamer in the same colors as the ribbon carried on the unit's standard.
