= Order of Naval Merit (Dominican Republic) =

Order of Naval Merit Orden del Mérito Naval
- Type: Three division military merit order with four classes
- Awarded for: Extraordinary services and merit
- Country: Dominican Republic
- Eligibility: Members of the Navy of the Dominican Republic
- Post-nominals: M.N.
- Motto: Courage and Loyalty
- Established: 5 July 1954
- Ribbon bar for the Valour Medal Ribbon bar for the Honour Medal Ribbon bar for the Distinguished Service Medal Ribbon bar of the Merit Medal

Precedence
- Next (higher): Order of Military Heroism Captain General Santana
- Next (lower): Order of Military Merit

The Order of Naval Merit is an honour awarded to members of the Dominican Navy. It was established on 5 July 1954.

== Divisions ==
The award is divided in four decorations, in order of precedence:

- Valour Medal: to Non-Commissioned Officers.
- Honour Medal: to Junior Officers and Midshipmen.
- Distinguished Medal: to Junior Officers and Midshipmen.
- Naval Merit Medal: to General Officers and Superior Officers.

== Post-Nominal ==
The person awarded with this honour should be added the post-nominal M. N. (Mérito Naval, Spanish for Naval Merit) after his or her full name, in all the official papers and documents.

== See also ==
- Orders, decorations, and medals of the Dominican Republic
