= Order of Military Merit (Dominican Republic) =

Order of Military Merit Orden del Mérito de Militar
- Type: Three division Military Merit Order with four classes
- Awarded for: Extraordinary services and merit.
- Country: Dominican Republic
- Eligibility: Members of the Army of the Dominican Republic.
- Post-nominals: M.M.
- Motto: Honour, Virtue, Valor
- Established: 15 November 1930
- Ribbon bar for combat division Ribbon bar for long service division Ribbon bar for other services division

Precedence
- Next (higher): Order of Naval Merit
- Next (lower): Order of Air Merit

The Order of Military Merit (Spanish: Orden del Mérito de Militar) is an honour awarded to members of the Military of the Dominican Republic. It was established on 15 November 1930.

== Divisions and classes ==
The Order is in three divisions:

1. Awarded for combat or war service. Displayed on a red ribbon
2. Awarded for long and faithful service. Displayed on a blue ribbon
3. Awarded for other service. Displayed on a white ribbon

Within each division, the award is made in one of four classes:

- First Class: to General Officers.
- Second Class: to Superior Officers.
- Third Class: to Junior Officers.
- Fourth Class: to Non-Commissioned Officers.

The motto of the order is Honour, Virtue, Valor.

== Recipients ==
- James Carson Breckinridge
- James T. Moore (USMC)
- Julian C. Smith
- Allen H. Turnage
- Gregon A. Williams
- William A. Worton

== Post-Nominal ==
The person awarded with this honour should be added the post-nominal M. M. (Mérito Militar, Spanish for Militar Merit) after his or her full name, in all the official papers and documents.

== See also ==
- Orders, decorations, and medals of the Dominican Republic
