= Military Medal (Luxembourg) =

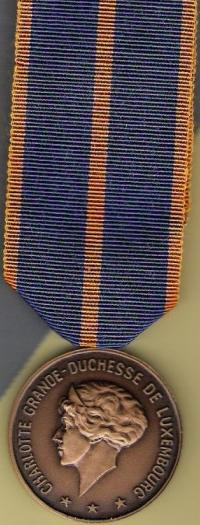
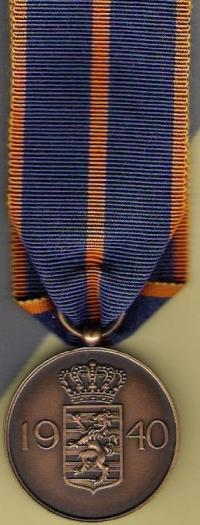
- Obverse and reverse of the Military Medal
- Type: Military decoration
- Awarded for: Exceptionally distinguished military achievement
- Country: Luxembourg
- Presented by: the Grand Duke of Luxembourg
- Eligibility: Luxembourgers and foreigners
- Established: 30 October 1945
- Ribbon bar of the medal

Precedence
- Next (higher): Order of Merit of the Grand Duchy of Luxembourg
- Next (lower): Cross of Honour and Military Merit

The Military Medal (French: Médaille militaire German: Militärmedaille) is the highest military decoration of Luxembourg. Established on 30 October 1945 by Charlotte, Grand Duchess of Luxembourg, at the suggestion of then Prince Jean, it can be awarded for outstanding achievements and extraordinary deeds to all military personnel, without distinction of rank.

== Appearance ==
The medal is a bronze circular disc. The obverse depicts the left facing profile of Grand Duchess Charlotte. Around the edge is the inscription Charlotte Grand Duchess of Luxembourg (Charlotte Grande-Duchesse de Luxembourg). The reverse depicts the Lesser coat of arms of Luxembourg. To the left of the arms is 19 and to the right 40.

== Recipients ==
- General of the Army Dwight D. Eisenhower, 3 August 1945
- Prince regent Charles of Belgium, 1 December 1945
- Prime Minister Winston Churchill, 14 July 1946
- Field Marshal Bernard Montgomery, 17 November 1948
- General Charles de Gaulle, 1 October 1963
- Major General Patrick F. Cassidy, 8 July 1967
- The Unknown Soldier of the United States for World War II, 22 October 1984
- Jean, Grand Duke of Luxembourg, 17 December 2002
- Corporal Richard Brookins, 2016
