= Cross of Merit =

A Cross of Merit is a personal decoration which is generally above the rank of medal and below that of knight, and may refer to:

== Germany ==
- Federal Cross of Merit

== The Netherlands ==
- Cross of Merit of the Order of the House of Orange
- Cross of Merit (Netherlands), a decoration for bravery
- Cross of Merit of the Netherlands Red Cross

== Poland ==
- Cross of Merit (Poland)
- Cross of Merit with Swords (Poland)
- Cross of Merit for Bravery (Poland)
- Cross of Merit (Polish Scouting and Guiding Association)

== Ukraine ==
- Cross of Merit (Ukrainian Insurgent Army)

== Other ==
- Cross of Merit (EOHSJ)
- Cross of the Order pro Merito Melitensi, Sovereign Military Order of Malta
- Cross of Merit (Estonia)

== See also ==
- Order of Merit (disambiguation)
