= Medal of Merit of the Dominican Woman =

- Type: Medal
- Presented by: Dominican Republic
- Status: Currently awarded
- Established: 1985

The Medal of Merit of the Dominican Woman is a decoration awarded by the Dominican government to women that were prominent in their social occupation. It was established by decree on 29 May 1985 to be conferred on 8 March of each year, the International Women's Day.

The Medal is conferred by the government on recommendation of the Consultive Council of the Ministry of the Woman.

March 8, 1986, was the first time that the medal was conferred. Since then, more than 100 women in different areas have been distinguished.
