= Order of Civil Merit (France) =

Ordre du Mérite civil
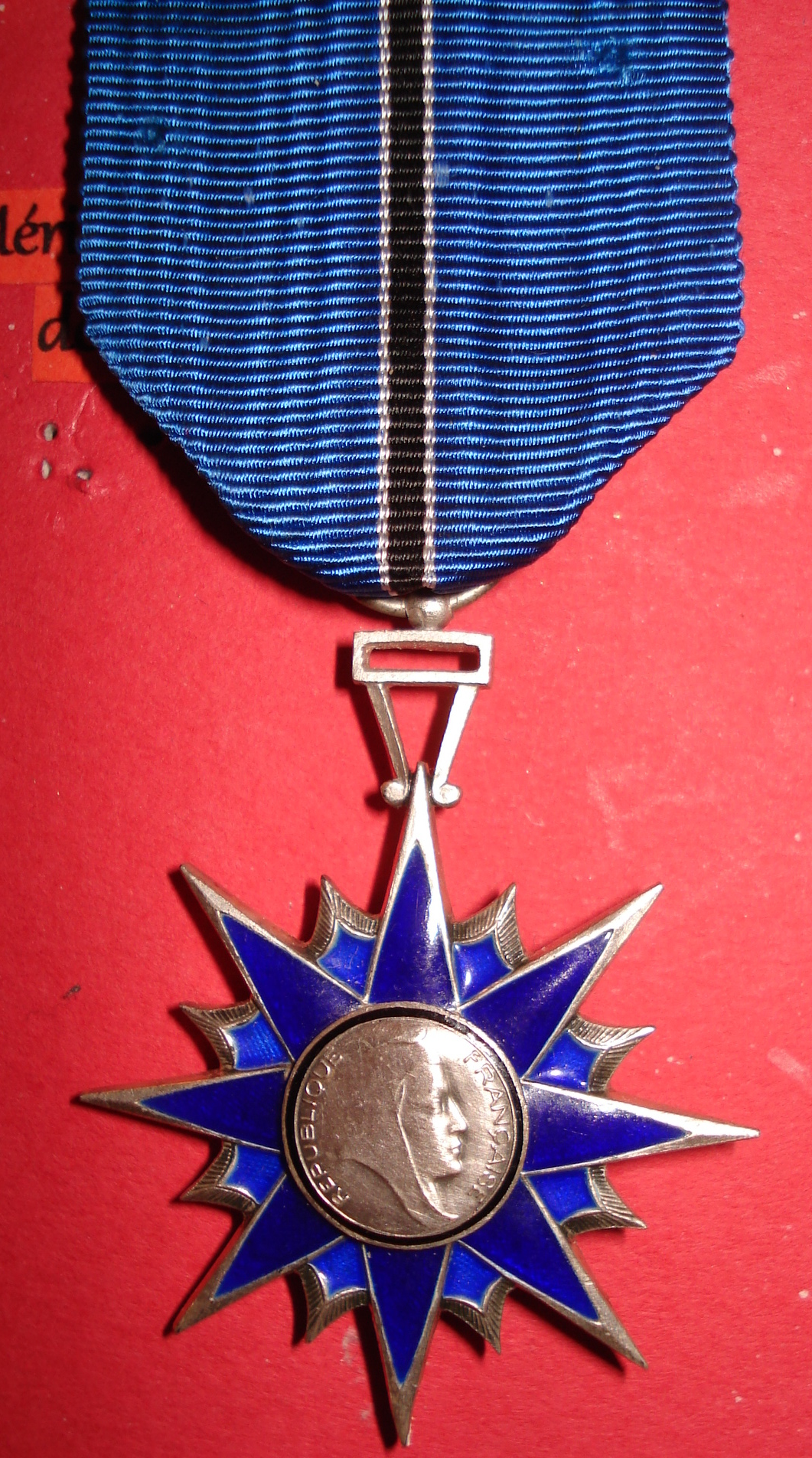

Awarded by France
- Type: Order with three degrees:
- Status: Deprecated 3 December 1963 by the Ordre National du Mérite
- Grades: Commandeur; Officier; Chevalier

Precedence
- Next (higher): Médaille militaire
- Next (lower): Croix de guerre

The Ordre du Mérite civil (Order of Civil Merit) of France was created on 14 October 1957 to reward individuals who have rendered services reported to the state as part of the Ministry of Interior, or to departments, municipalities and public institutions. The order is managed by the Interior minister, assisted by a Council of the Order.

The Order was deprecated by decree on 3 December 1963, and superseded by the Ordre national du Mérite. Extant members may continue to display their decorations.

== Classes ==
The Order has three classes:

- Commandeur (Commander)
- Officier (Officer)
- Chevalier (Knight)

Ribbon bars
Knight	Officer	Commander
