= Medal of Merit for Blood Donation =

Medal of Merit for Blood Donation Médaille du Mérite pour le don du sang
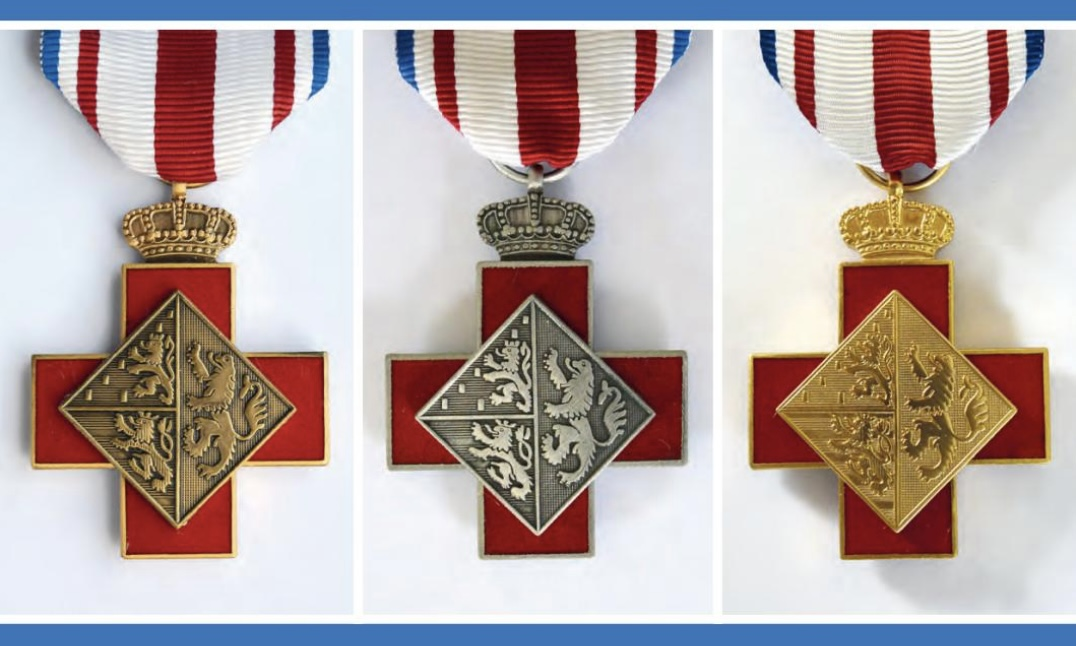
- Type: Civil decoration
- Awarded for: Exceptionally numerous repetitions of donating blood to the Luxembourg Red Cross
- Country: Luxembourg
- Presented by: the Grand Duke of Luxembourg
- Eligibility: Luxembourgers and foreigners
- Status: currently awarded
- Established: 22 October 1979
- First award: 30 June 1979

Highlights
- Total: to end of 2015: 3,085; 10,097; 17,629
- Ribbon bar of the medal

Precedence
- Next (higher): National Medal of Recognition
- Next (lower): Medal of Merit for Civil Defense

The Medal of Merit for Blood Donation (French: Médaille du Mérite pour le don du sang) is a civil state decoration of Luxembourg established in 1979.

== History ==
The three-grade medal was first awarded in a ceremony at the Grand Théâtre de Luxembourg on 30 June 1979, and formally established by a decree of Grand Duke Jean on 22 October 1979. It is awarded to voluntary blood donors only, by the Grand Duke of Luxembourg, at the request of the Minister of Health, who is advised by the Council of Order. The Council of Order originally consisted of five people; it was changed by decree of 4 February 1985 and presently the council consists of seven members, of which a minimum of six is required to make advice. Members of the council are appointed for a four-year term, renewable once. Foreigners may also be awarded, if they donated blood to a recognized organization in Luxembourg.

The Medal has three grades:

- Gold medal (80 donations)
- Silver medal (40 donations)
- Bronze medal (20 donations)

By 11 June 2016, 17,629 bronze medals, 10,097 silver medals and 3,085 gold medals had been awarded. New decorations are awarded every year; as of 2026, the latest award ceremony took place in Diekirch, when 175 citizens received a medal from Grand Duchess Stéphanie.

== Insignia ==
The badge of the medal is a red cross, enameled in red, crowned, with diamond-shape plaques. The obverse features the coat of arms of Grand Duchess Joséphine-Charlotte, which are three combined coats of arms with lions. In the upper left quarter is a lion, the coat of arms of Nassau, in the lower left quarter is a lion, the coat of arms of Luxembourg, and in the right half is a lion, the coat of arms of Belgium. The reverse features the profile of Grand Duchess Joséphine-Charlotte, facing left, surrounded by an inscription S.A.R Joséphine Charlotte Grande-Duchesse de Luxembourg (H.R.H. Joséphine Charlotte Grand Duchess of Luxembourg). Plaques, edges of cross and crown are, according to grade, gilded, silver or bronze. The ribbon of the medal is white with a red stripe in the middle and thin three-colour (blue-white-red) stripes at the edges.
