= Cross of Honour and Military Merit =

- Type: Military decoration
- Awarded for: Distinguished service to the military in times of peace and for acts of courage in time of war
- Country: Luxembourg
- Eligibility: Individuals, units, and groups of people
- Clasps: Palms for being mentioned in dispatches
- Established: May 1951

Order of wear
- Next (higher): Military Medal
- Next (lower): Luxembourg War Cross

Cross of Honour and Military Merit (French: Croix d'Honneur et de Mérite militaire) is a military decoration of Luxembourg established by Charlotte, Grand Duchess of Luxembourg in May 1951. The cross is awarded for distinguished service to the military in times of peace. In times of war the cross is awarded for outstanding acts of courage and bravery. The cross is awarded in three classes gilt, silver, and bronze.
