= National Order of Merit (Mauritania) =

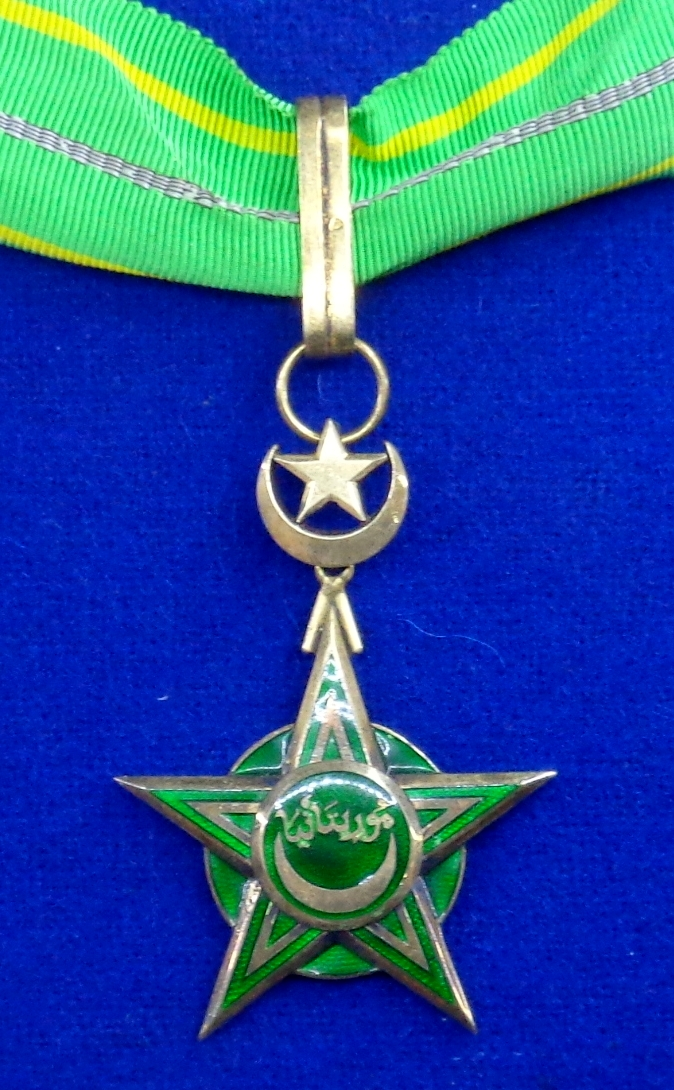

Awarded by President of Mauritania
- Type: Order of merit
- Status: Active
- President of Mauritania
- Grades: Five
- Ribbon bar

The National Order of Merit is an order of merit of Mauritania.
