= List of political parties in North Korea =

North Korea, officially the Democratic People's Republic of Korea, is formally a one-party state under the leadership of the Workers' Party of Korea (WPK) as the sole governing party. There are also two other minor parties, the Korean Social Democratic Party (KSDP) and the Chondoist Chongu Party. As of the latest election in 2026, these three parties and one organization (Chongryon) are represented in the Supreme People's Assembly, the country's unicameral parliament.

== History ==
A few days before the end of Japanese colonial rule, the last Japanese governor-general of Korea Nobuyuki Abe gave his approval for the formation of a political party in northern Korea. The founders of the party named it the National Party, which was founded on 30 August 1945. During the Soviet administration of northern Korea, the party was renamed to the National Socialist Party, intending to gain favor from the Soviet Union. However, the similarity of the party's name to the Nazi Party led it to be dissolved by Soviet authorities. In September 1945, several influential Christians including Yun Ha-young and Han Kyong-jik founded the Christian Social Democratic Party. The party was largely based in Sinuiju, and was later renamed to the Social Democratic Party to gain larger support, but eventually disintegrated after its suppression due to a student protest on 22 November.

On 12 October 1945, Soviet authorities allowed the creation of political parties in northern Korea, leading to the establishment of the North Korean Branch Bureau of the Communist Party of Korea. This was followed by the establishment of the Korean Democratic Party on 3 November by Cho Man-sik, who was later removed from his position as party leader in January 1946 due to his opposition to a four-power trusteeship plan for Korea backed by the Soviets. In January 1946, Kim Il Sung met with the representatives of Cheondoism and approved their request to form their own party, who then formed the Chondoist Chongu Party on 8 February. This was followed by the establishment of the New People's Party of Korea, featuring members of the Yan'an faction of independence fighters who had been to China. On 10 April, the North Korean Branch Bureau became independent of the CPK and changed its name to the Communist Party of North Korea. On 28 August, the Communist Party of North Korea and the New People's Party of Korea merged to form the Workers' Party of North Korea.

In 1948, the Workers' Party of North Korea founded the Democratic People's Republic of Korea. On 24 June 1949, the WPNK merged with the Workers' Party of South Korea to form the Workers' Party of Korea, which has remained the sole ruling party of North Korea since. Other minor parties, such as the Korean Democratic Party (which was later renamed to the Korean Social Democratic Party in 1980) and the Chondoist Chongu Party, were quickly made subservient and incorporated to the Democratic Front for the Reunification of Korea (DFRK). Since then, the WPK been constitutionally guaranteed a leading role in North Korea, with the two minor parties operating under its leadership.

== Current parties ==
Party	Status	Ref
Workers' Party of Korea (Workers' Party) 조선로동당; Chosŏn Rodongdang	Ruling party	
Korean Social Democratic Party (KSDP) 조선사회민주당; Chosŏn Sahoe Minjudang	Minor party, allied to the WPK	
Chondoist Chongu Party (Chondoist Chongu Party) 천도교청우당; Ch'ŏndogyo Ch'ŏngudang	Minor party, allied to the WPK	
Chongryon (CYJ) 재일본 조선인 총련합회; Chaeilbon Chosŏnin Ch'ongryŏnhaphoe	Not a party but a North Korean-aligned organization for Zainichi Koreans in Japan. Despite this, it still appoints members of the SPA.	

== Former parties ==
Party	Status	Ref
Korea Buddhist Federation (KBF) 조선불교도련맹; Chosŏn-bulgyodo-ryŏnmaeng	Pseudo-party, last time won a seat with certainty in 1972	
Democratic Independent Party (Democratic Independent Party) 민주독립당; Minju Tongnipdang	Participated in elections between 1948 and 1967, last time won a seat with certainty in 1962	
Dongro People's Party (DPP) 동로인민당 (東路人民黨); Dongro Inmindang	Participated in elections between 1948 and 1967, last time won a seat with certainty in 1962	
Gonmin People's Alliance (GMH) (Sometimes translated as Union of People's Masses (UPM, 건민인민연합)) 건민회; Gonminhoe	Participated in elections between 1957 and 1967, originally South Korea-based party, last time won a seat with certainty in 1957 and in 1962	
People's Republic Party (IRP) 인민공화당; Inmin Konghwadang	South Korea-based party, participated in elections between 1948 and 1967, last time won a seat with certainty in 1957	
Laboring People's Party (Laboring People's Party) 근로인민당 (動勞人民黨); Kŭllo Inmindang	South Korea-based party, last time won a seat with certainty in 1962	

== Dissolved parties ==
Party	Status	Ref
Workers' Party of North Korea (Workers' Party) 북조선로동당; Pukchosŏn Rodongdang	Merged with the Workers' Party of South Korea in 1949 to form the Workers' Party of Korea.	
New People's Party of Korea 조선신민당; Chosŏn Sinmindang	Merged with the Communist Party of Korea in 1946 to form the Workers' Party of North Korea.	
Communist Party of Korea 조선공산당; Chosŏn Kongsandang	Merged with the New People's Party of Korea in 1946 to form the Workers' Party of North Korea.	

== North Korean opposition parties ==
There is currently no known organized opposition within North Korea that is independently verifiable. However, there are various exiled dissident groups that advocate for regime change. In 2024, U.S state-run news outlet Radio Free Asia claimed there may be opposition parties within North Korea.

- Free Joseon
- North Korea Freedom Coalition
- Fighters for a Free North Korea
- North Korean People's Liberation Front
- New Joseon (Free Democratic Party)

== See also ==
- Elections in North Korea
- Politics of North Korea
- List of ruling political parties by country
