= Balloon propaganda campaigns in Korea =

Propaganda campaigns between North and South Korea

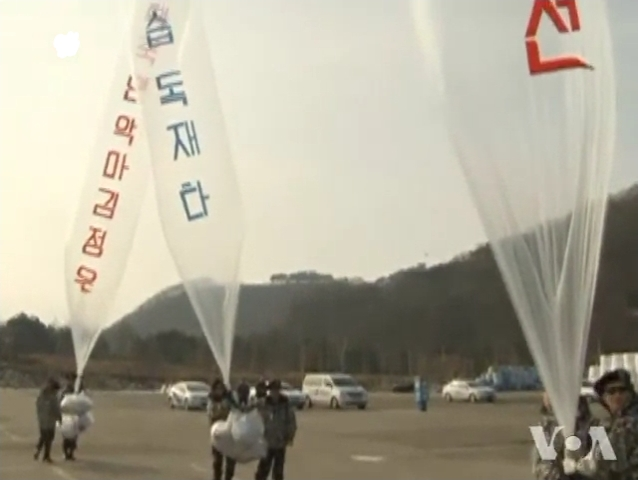
South Korean activists releasing balloons critical of Kim Jong Un.

Balloon propaganda campaigns in Korea include both North and South Korean propaganda leaflet campaigns, with the use of balloons as a distribution method since the Korean War. It is a form of psychological warfare. A variety of other contents have also been included with the balloons. Originally, these campaigns were organized by the governments and militaries of the Korean states. Contemporarily, however, they are mainly organized by South Korean non-governmental organizations (NGOs) that regularly involve themselves in balloon release events that aim to send materials censored in North Korea (including pornography and Christian materials), as well as various other goods, to the North Korean people.

The main motivations of the South Korean balloon campaigns have been a desire to support democratization and to incite a regime change in North Korea. However, the effectiveness of such leaflet campaigning has been debated. Furthermore, the balloon drops may have worsened tensions on the Korean Peninsula, and the launches have also been met with increasing opposition from the South Korean society. The North Korean state has targeted propaganda to South Korean soldiers in the Korean Demilitarized Zone (DMZ) in retaliation against Southern propaganda campaigns.

The official stance of both the South and North Korean governments has been against the continuing balloon drops. However, the South Korean government has been hesitant to intervene in the launches by activists due to concerns about freedom of expression. However, some actions by officials, like banning the use of boats in balloon launches, have greatly reduced the amount of leaflets flying into North Korea. In recent years, there have been few cases of official leaflet droppings by either state. However, government organized psychological warfare between the Korean states largely disappeared in the aftermath of the Sunshine Policy, regardless of renewed tensions since.

In December 2020, South Korean parliament passed a law criminalizing the launching of propaganda leaflets, whether in balloons or in bottles, into North Korea. Proponents argue that the legislation will improve relations with North Korea while opponents have raised concerns related to freedom of speech and human rights. In September 2023, the law was struck down by South Korea's Constitutional Court.

== History ==
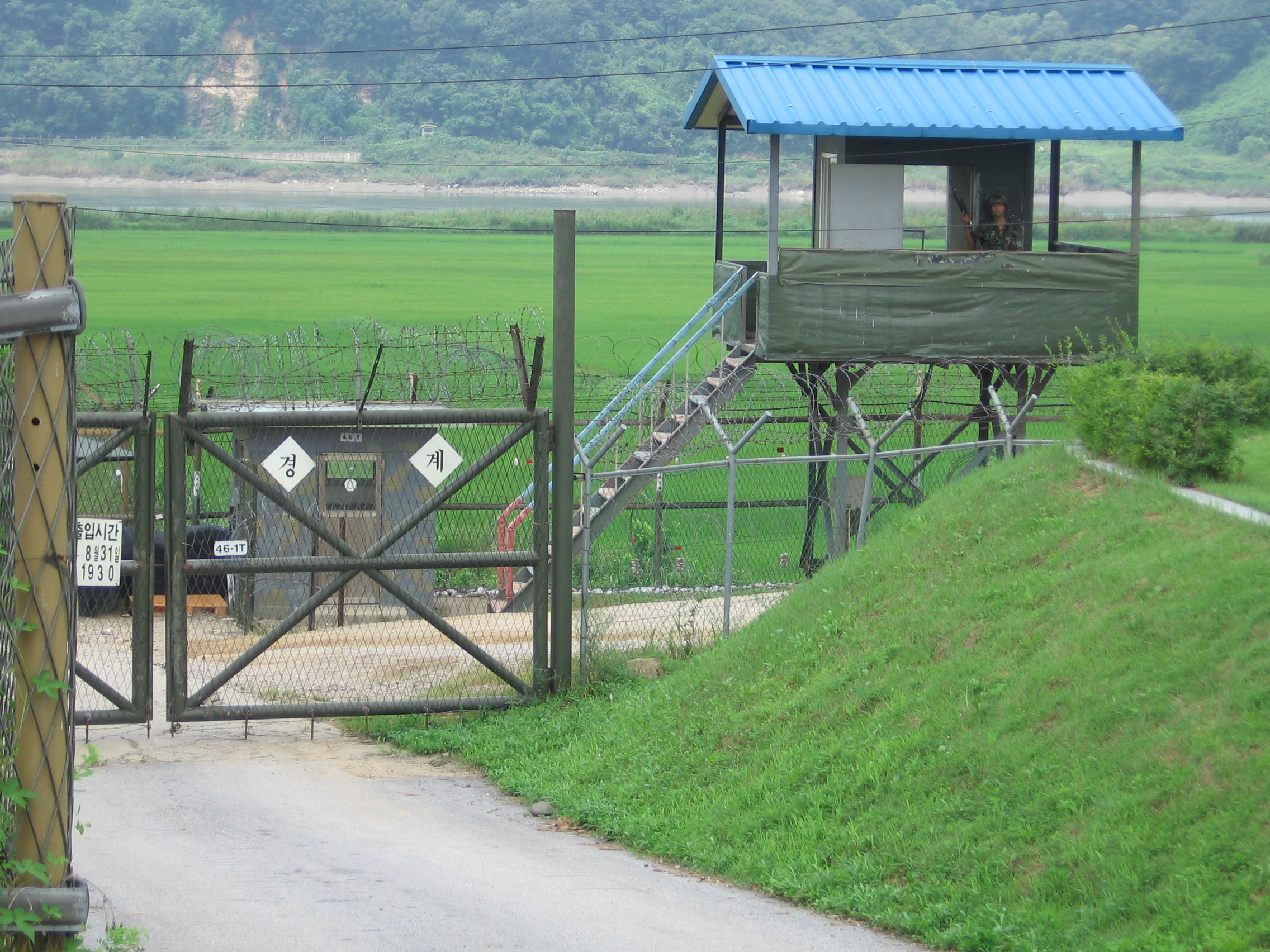
A South Korean sentry post seen from South Korea in the Korean Demilitarized Zone (DMZ)

The origins of propaganda campaign competitions on the Korean Peninsula can be traced back to the Korean War, when the United Nations forces shelled Chinese and North Koreans with an estimated total of 2.5 billion leaflets. A historical study has estimated that the amount of leaflets was so great that it would have been enough to cover the whole peninsula under a layer 35 leaflets thick. In comparison, North Koreans only spread 30 million leaflets during the war. The Korean balloons can also be compared with the German situation during the Cold War with mauerseglers (wall sailors) sending balloons with goods over the Berlin Wall.

Balloon drops were organized by the South Korean state until the beginning of the Sunshine Policy under the Kim Dae-jung administration. Both Koreas halted psychological warfare for the duration of 2004–2010; in addition to balloons, this prohibited radio broadcasts, billboards and loudspeakers on the DMZ. The North Korean state had originally demanded that as a precondition for the first Inter-Korean summit in 2000, and the request was later accepted by the Kim Dae-jung administration. After the Yeonpyeong incident in 2010, balloon drops were organized by the defense ministry in late 2010 for some time, but they have since been suspended again after having lasted for a year.

There have been a few instances of similar balloon propaganda campaigns launched by North Korea to South Korea; however, campaigns on the Korean Peninsula primarily target North Korea. There was a balloon release by North Korea in July 2012 as a response to an official South Korean military leaflet campaign in the aftermath of the Yeonpyeong incident.

In 2010, there was public support for a hard line against North Korea during increased tensions, but the support declined by 2011. A poll in late 2014 revealed that recent developments had turned many in South Korea against leaflet campaigns: 58 percent of respondents were against the balloon launches.

In May 2018, both Koreas made a commitment to end the balloon propaganda campaign and an attempt made by North Korean defectors to continue the campaign was sabotaged by the South Korean government.

On 4 June 2020, Kim Jong Un's sister Kim Yo Jong issued a long statement calling the balloon-senders "human scum" and "mongrel dogs". The statement called the South Korean government "owners of the mongrel dogs" and stated the government should be held accountable for the balloons. Kim Yo Jong threatened to withdraw from a no-hostility pact as well as from joint ventures. South Korea stated within hours that it was planning legislation against the "tension-causing" balloons. A BBC correspondent stated the rapid compliance "is not a good look (for South Korea)... Most defectors have endured incredible hardship to win the right to free speech." On 9 June, North Korea cut all ties to the South, citing the balloon issue. On 10 June, South Korea stated it would press charges, using a law governing inter-Korean exchanges and cooperation, against two South Korean activist groups for sending unauthorized materials to the North.

On 16 June 2020 North Korea demolished the Inter-Korean Liaison Office in Kaesong. The office established in 2018 to facilitate communication between the two Koreas had been closed since January 2020 due to the COVID-19 pandemic. Its destruction followed several days of threats from North Korea over the South Korean government's failure to prevent defectors and activists from sending anti-North Korean propaganda leaflets across the border. North Korea had cut official communication lines with South Korea a week earlier.

On 14 December 2020, South Korea's National Assembly passed a law that penalizes the sending of anti-North Korean material across the DMZ. Proponents of the legislation argued that it is intended to avoid unnecessary provoking North Korea, to ensure the safety of those living along the border, and to secure stable relations with North Korea. However, opponents have argued that the legislation sympathizes with or yields to North Korean threats over the balloon campaigns. The amendment to the Development of Inter-Korean Relations Act had been protested by several human rights groups in South Korea, such as Amnesty International. It has also received criticism from several individuals and groups outside Korea.

On 28 May 2024, North Korea sent 260 balloons containing feces and garbage into South Korea, apparently in retaliation for Northern defectors into South Korea sending balloons into North Korea containing anti-North Korean sentiments.

In June 2024, the unification ministry of South Korea reported it was considering meeting with a North Korean defectors' group that launched anti-North Korean leaflets across the border. South Korea resumed loudspeaker broadcasts for the first time in six years, but paused to prevent escalation amid rising tensions. The ministry reported it would not officially ask the defectors' group to stop leaflet campaigns, citing a Constitutional Court ruling that deemed such bans unconstitutional. However, police may intervene if the operations pose a serious threat to border residents.

== Balloon contents ==
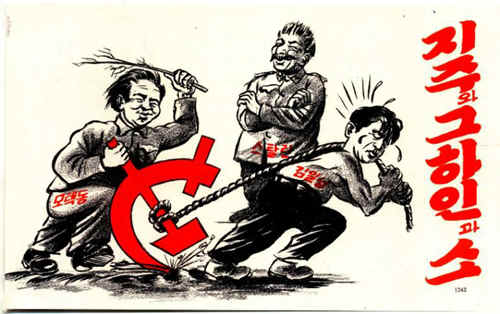
A United Nations force leaflet from the Korean War: Kim Il Sung manipulated by Mao and Stalin. The text on the right reads: "the landlord and his servant and the cow."

The South Korean propaganda during the Korean War, through its extensive leafletting involving 2.5 billion leaflets, was also intended to display the capitalist world's ability to outproduce its communist rivals. A study by I. H. Lee found that bias against North Koreans in the South Korean society was prefigured in the visual forms of United Nations propaganda during the Korean War. In comparison, North Korean propaganda during the war largely mirrored contemporary Soviet propaganda.

Jin-Heon Jung claims there has been little change in the contents and aims of South Korean leaflets themselves since the transition from military launches to civilian launches. Historically, there have been some oversights in cultural sensitivities in leaflets, such as in translation from South Korean orthography to North Korean orthography. For instance, North Koreans did not understand words like Hŏnggari (Korean for 'Hungary') or Ssoryŏn (Korean for 'Soviet Union'), as they are written in North Korea as Wengari and Rossiya, respectively. The leaflets include a mix of scandals, information and enticements. Some of the leaflets include proselytism for born again Evangelicalism, or Gospels from the Bible. One leaflet reportedly juxtaposed Kim Il Sung with Jesus in its message, saying: "Believe Jesus Christ instead of Kim Il Sung". During the Cold War, the propaganda competition evolved to resemble a struggle between the two relatively new influences in Korea: communism and Christianity. High-ranking defector Hwang Jang-yop's actions have also been featured in the leaflets.

Our dear siblings in North Korea! Hello North Korean siblings! Around the world, people are always with you. Your difficulties are well-known internationally. We hope North and South Korean people will reunite in the near future. Please live a long and healthy life! Stay strong. We love you. We miss you so much. Warning! It is possible that some bad people may have sprayed these socks with poison that could harm you. If you find the socks, do not touch them with your bare hands. Pick them up with tools and store them in plastic bags. If possible, rinse these socks under running water for at least 10 hours before wearing.

— A letter carried by activist group North Korea Peace's balloons

Balloon drops by the South Korean government historically included—in addition to the propaganda leaflets—sweets, lighters, tobacco and pornography. Today, the contents launched by non-governmental organizations include various kinds of media and other goods and essentials. They have sent, for example, U.S. dollars, instant noodles, booklets, nylon stockings and high quality socks, friendly letters, radios, as well as DVDs, USB sticks and SD cards with banned media content, such as copies of the Korean Wikipedia. Choco pies have also been included, as they have become prized and valuable items to barter with. After the Sony Pictures Entertainment hacking incident, many activists sent copies of The Interview to North Korea. Some of these movies sent to North Korea have been cut by the activists with the most offensive parts removed. Some of the leaflets launched today are made of light, water-proof polyvinyl.

Contemporary leaflets dropped by the North Korean government have relatively simple contents, and are reminiscent of propaganda used by the North. The leaflets include various slogans. In 2016 some balloons were filled with trash in addition of propaganda leaflets. Leaflets from the past decades had more varied contents.

== South Korean organizations involved ==
Recent organizations involved with the balloon campaigns include North Korean defectors' organizations, South Korean evangelical Protestants and conservatives, various organizations of other Christian denominations and United States based organizations. In the participating North Korean defectors' organizations, ex-military members are over-represented. Women constitute up to 70 percent of North Korean defectors; however, it is mainly men from relatively elite or military background who lead the balloon campaigns. The defectors' organizations are the most active ones; the two main organizations for flying leaflets to North Korea are Fighters for a Free North Korea and North Korean Christian Association.

Fighters for a Free North Korea, Campaign for Helping North Koreans in Direct Way, North Korean Christian Association and North Korean People's Liberation Front are among the active balloon releasing defectors' groups. However, Park Sang-hak claims that, unlike other defector groups, Fighters for a Free North Korea does not receive funding from the government—they have a couple of hundred supporters who donate five to ten U.S. dollars a month. Some of the defector activists, like the North Korean People's Liberation Front, have contacts across the Chinese border area, and smuggle media across the rivers to North Korea.

Native South Korean NGOs involved include the National Action Campaign for Freedom and Democracy in Korea, Korean Parents League, Chogabje.com, Family Association of South Korean POWs and Abductees, Cornerstone Ministries, and various others. Suzanne Scholte from the Defense Forum Foundation is the chairwoman of the North Korea Freedom Coalition. The North Korea Freedom Coalition is among the biggest supporters of the organizations involved. Anonymous Christian donors and overseas churches are also a noteworthy source of funding.

Park Sang-hak has described their motives as trying to break the information curtain and raise the people's consciousness to encourage North Koreans in overthrowing their leaders. The Human Rights Foundation stresses its beliefs on freedom of speech, self-determination, freedom of association, freedom of movement and democracy. In addition to hoping to topple the regime and agitating, the involved human rights organizations advocate causes like helping refugees, doing humanitarian work for disabled people living in North Korea, proselytizing Christianity, and various other causes.

=== Role of Protestant Evangelicalism ===
Protestant Evangelicalism is a common contemporary denominator for the majority of NGOs involved with the balloon drops since the drops became essentially privatized. Jung Jin-heon argues that there has been a polarization in the South Korean society since start of the Sunshine Policy: as the polarization between states decreased, the ideological and political polarization within South Korea increased. Jung notes that Evangelical church leaders have led protests against both regimes. Unlike in other Asian nations, like Japan, South Koreans did not resist Western missionaries, and as a result, Christianity became politically linked to the anti-communist movement in South Korea. The Bush administration's hard line towards North Korea and funding for anti-North organizations has also had an important impact on the formation of an international human rights movement against North Korea.

There has also been competition between the two major broadcasting companies in South Korea during the Cold War in the messages sent to the North Korean people. These companies are the government-run Korean Broadcasting System (KBS) and the private Evangelical Protestant Far East Broadcasting Corporation.

Jung points out that 80 percent of North Koreans arriving in South Korea identify themselves as Christians. These defectors will rely on and stay in touch with churches. Many of them assume leadership positions as activists against the North Korean regime.

== Types of balloons ==
Activists launching propaganda balloons

The balloons most commonly used by NGOs are unconventional transparent 12-meter long cylindrical helium- or hydrogen-filled balloons. Sturdy double-walled greenhouse plastic is used for the balloons. The balloons include propaganda messages written on the surface in Korean script. These balloons were developed to replace blimps previously used by the South Korean government, which were no longer being produced. After the balloons travel far enough across the border, a timer opens the plastic bags carried by the balloons. The balloons can travel up to 200 kilometers, and the maximum load for each balloon is 10 kilograms. Fighters for a Free North Korea spends approximately 500 U.S. dollars for each balloon launched; however, the balloons are considered a low-cost solution.

Fighters for a Free North Korea has considered improving their GPS capabilities to better understand their balloons' movements. Since early 2015, helicopter drones have been used to distribute materials.

== Launch sites ==
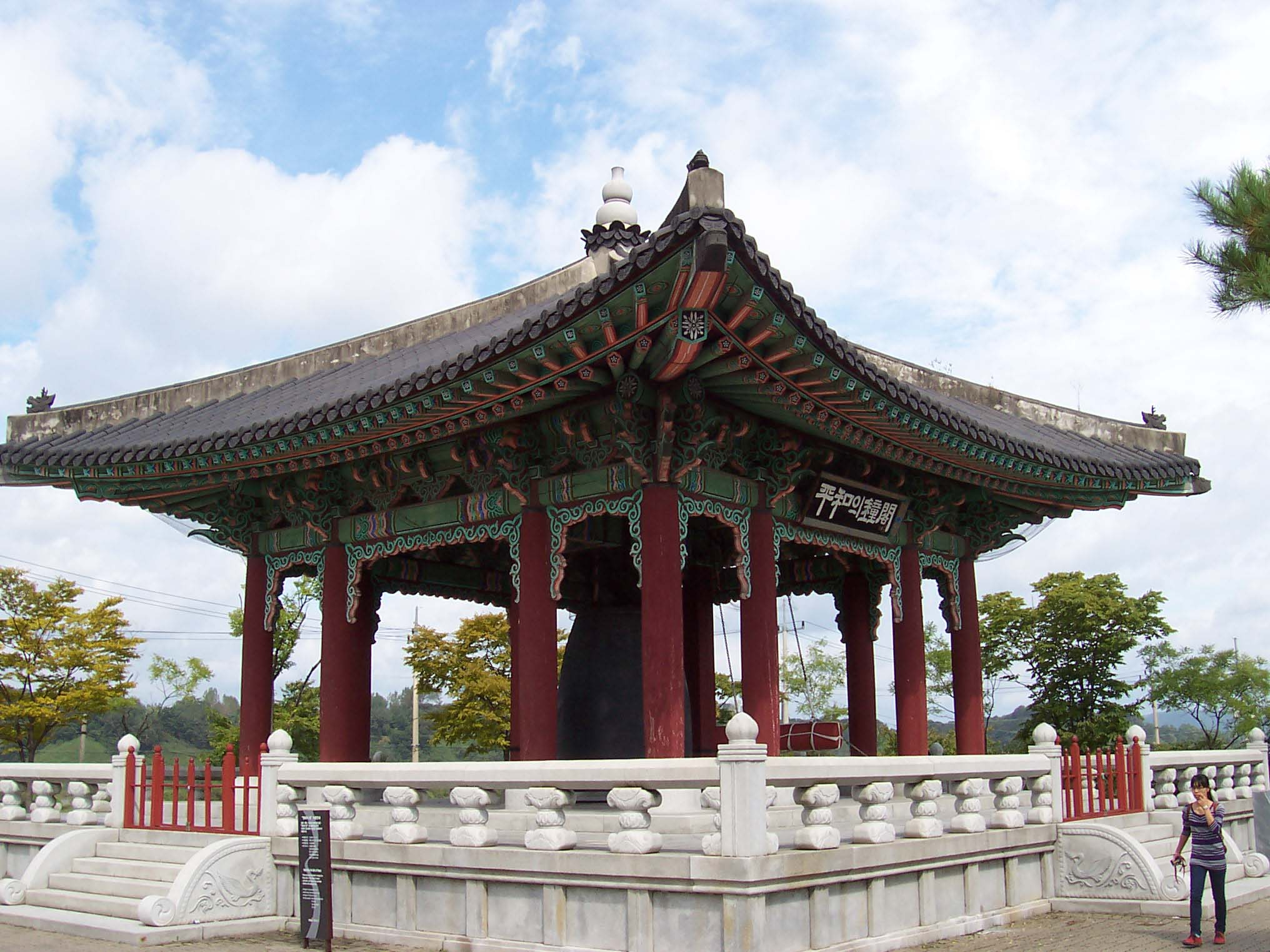
Imjingak's grounds are a frequent spot for the activists' rallies.

Imjingak's Imjin Pavilion grounds, the Tongil Park parking lot in the city of Paju and the island of Ganghwa on the west coast are common places for anti-North Korea activists to hold protests and launch balloons. Balloons have also been launched on boats, but launching from boats was prohibited in 2013 by the South Korean government. Park Sang-hak says that Fighters for a Free North Korea was able to send twice as many leaflets to the North Korea using boats. In comparison, during 2014, they managed to fly only seven to eight million leaflets into North Korea.

The launches have been met with resistance from the locals living nearby. Fear has also been harmful for local tourism and business. Residents of the city of Paju living near the launch site of Imjingak tried to stop balloons from being launched in October 2014 by blocking the way with tractors. The locals were joined by left-wing activists supporting rapprochement. However, a small group of North Korean defector activists managed to break away and launch 20,000 leaflets from the nearby town of Gimpo. Launching balloons is not illegal, but the South Korean police sometimes intervenes. Some of the failed balloon release attempts have ended in clashes with the South Korean police and activists, such as Park Sang-hak being detained in April 2015.

The climate of Korea poses a challenge for the launches, as the winds blow east for 80 percent of the year and only occasionally blow from the south to the north. Balloons sometimes end up in the sea or back to South Korea. There has been a case of the leaflets falling over Seoul due to unreliable weather.

== North Korean counter-campaigns ==
In addition to using balloons as a means of delivery, North Koreans have also used rockets to send leaflets to the DMZ. Many of the retrieved Cold-War era leaflets included maps. One of the leaflets found on the DMZ included a map of Cho Dae-hum's route of defection to North Korea across the DMZ. Many North Korean leaflets during the Cold War gave instructions, in addition to maps, to help the targeted South Korean soldiers in defecting.

North Korea restored its balloon leaflet campaign in July 2012 during increased peninsular tensions after the failed satellite launch attempt involving Kwangmyŏngsŏng-3 earlier in April. The propaganda leaflets targeting western border areas in October 2012 praised pro-North activists and criticized the South Korean defense ministry's "anti-Pyongyang education program". This leaflet campaign occurred after South Korea resumed their own balloon leafletting campaign after the bombardment of Yeonpyeong in 2010–2011. In October 2012, a total of around 16,000–17,000 North Korean leaflets were found by patrolling South Korean soldiers. That had been, according to the South Korean defense ministry, the second time in 2012 they discovered North Korean leaflets after North Korea resumed leafletting in July. There had been a 12-year long break with North Korean leafletting. It was reported in 2016 that North Korea was still using leaflets. Unlike in the past, North Korea has adopted a new way of showing its disapproval through propaganda instead of resorting into using military force by shooting across the border. In response to the 2016 South Korean political scandal, North Korea intensified leaflet drops supporting the removal of President Park Geun-hye. In February 2017, North Korean leaflets attacking Donald Trump were found in Seoul. In 2018, North Korea dropped leaflets promoting rapprochement with the South in the upcoming Winter Olympics.

North Korea has warned its citizens that the goods carried by the balloons from South Korea are poisoned, but the North Korean people have been known to ignore these warnings. Due to their size, the balloons are easy to track. North Korea has been accused of intercepting the balloons and poisoning their contents to convince its citizens that South Koreans do not have good intentions. Organizations like North Korea Peace responded by substituting food with socks, including a warning and instructions for how to render the poisoned socks harmless. Defector and Korean Peninsula International Peace Organization spokesman Lee Ju-Seong stated in 2012 that one good pair of South Korean socks can be sold for enough corn to feed a child for two months.

Activists have accused some of the anti-balloon drop protesters of being paid counter-protesters supported and organized by the North Korean state. However, there is genuine opposition against the launches in the wider South Korean society, beyond the locals near the launch sites. Some counter-protesters object to provoking a nuclear state, and believe that a dialogue with North Korean leadership is needed for the reunification of the Korean peninsula. As some defectors dress in military-style uniforms and sunglasses, this has been a point for objections. Additionally, there is an estimated three to five percent support for the far-left and the Kim regime in South Korea.

=== 2024 trash balloon campaign ===
In May 2024, North Korea began sending balloons loaded with trash into South Korea. Initially, the balloons were believed to contain propaganda leaflets. However, further investigation revealed that balloons were filled with trash, including household waste, organic waste like fertilizer, batteries, cigarette butts, and even soil with parasites. Some also included Hello Kitty prints and worn apparel with release mechanisms designed to scatter debris mid-flight.

Between May and November 2024 North Korea sent approximately 7,000 balloons toward South Korea in 32 separate rounds according to the South Korean military. The launches constituted a months-long campaign and reached areas across South Korea and included the Seoul metropolitan area.

North Korea stated that the balloons were launched in response to a campaign by North Korean defectors and activists in South Korea, who regularly send anti-Pyongyang leaflets, food, medicine, money, and USB sticks with Korean cultural content across the border. The South Korean unification ministry had suggested that the contents inside may reflect the struggles amongst North Korean society.

Several trash-filled balloons have landed near the Seoul metropolitan area, with some remaining intact while others scattered debris across the ground, prompting public safety and health concerns, particularly regarding parasites. South Korean citizens have been advised not to touch the balloons due to the risk of contamination and to report any sightings to local authorities.

In response, South Korea's military issued warnings, stating that "stern military measures" would be taken if the balloon launches "cross the line" or endanger South Korean residents. However, the military refrained from shooting down the balloons, citing safety concerns over the spread of waste and potential environmental hazards from the debris. The balloons also caused disruptions to aviation and property damage. Between 1 June and 24 September runways at Incheon International Airport and Gimpo International Airport were closed on 20 separate days for a combined 413 minutes because of balloons detected nearby. On the 26th of June operations at Incheon International Airport were suspended for nearly three hours. This caused several flights to be delayed or diverted. Some balloons also caused small fires after landing where South Korea's military said that timer devices using thermal wires to detach the balloons' loads could ignite fires. By early September authorities in Seoul and Gyeonggi Province had recorded more than 100 million won in property damage associated with the balloons.

== Government positions ==
=== North Korean government ===
The North Korean government routinely threatens people involved in the balloon drops. Uriminzokkiri carried a threatening message in 2013 accusing the activists of acting as human shields for the North Korean activist defectors present.

The Secretariat of the Committee for Peaceful Reunification, Rodong Sinmun and the National Defense Commission have repeatedly condemned the South Korean government's policy on North Korea. The state of North Korea holds the government of South Korea responsible for the balloon drops, and has demanded for harder actions against the activists. North Korea has also threatened military action. On 1 December 2012, the Secretariat issued a statement demanding then presidential candidate Park Geun-hye to terminate president Lee Myung-bak's policy and to fulfill her presidential election pledge. The Secretariat of the Committee for Peaceful Reunification warned that provokers will be held fully accountable and that the relations of the two states would be again pushed to a catastrophe in the event that the launch would be allowed to happen. Rodong Sinmun stated in October 2014 that the South Korean government's tolerance of the balloon launches is comparable to an act of war.

North Korea has reacted most seriously to leaflets critical of the leaders of North Korea. In summer 2015, one such leaflet launch carried death threats not only to prominent military leaders, but to Kim Jong Un and his wife Ri Sol-ju too, which provoked Committee for Peaceful Reunification to respond three days after the launch. The committee accused that leaflet campaigning could not be conducted without protection from the South Korean National Intelligence Service, Ministry of National Defense or Ministry of Unification.

=== South Korean government ===
The South Korean police occasionally prevents balloon releases out of fear that North Korea may retaliate and endanger civilians living nearby. The government has claimed that the actions of the activists are within freedom of expression, and has appealed to the activists not to commit provocations towards North Korea. Chairman Kim Moo-sung of the Saenuri Party was concerned that hardline anti-North Korea activists might not be helping inter-Korean relations, after a balloon launch provoked a shoot-out across the Korean Demilitarized Zone on 10 October 2014. As a response to the criticism that the government is not doing enough to stop the balloon launches, president Park Geun-hye said that the issue would be "dealt with in a way that considers both freedom of expression and the safety of local residents".

A senior official from the Unification Ministry spoke anonymously and remarked that previously they tried to stop the balloon releases, but since the Cheonan sinking, they have left the matter to the local police to solve, who intervene if there is a threat of violence.

On 14 December 2020, the South Korean congress passed a law banning the launch of propaganda leaflets into North Korea. In the past, this had usually been carried with balloons and in bottles on the border rivers. The law would go into effect three months after it was approved. Violators face up to three years in prison or 30 million won ($27,400) in fines. In September 2023, the law was struck down by South Korea's Constitutional Court.

=== Establishment of buffer zones ===
On 1 November 2018, both Koreas established buffer zones near the Korean border. According to the Agreement on the Implementation of the Historic Panmunjom Declaration in the Military Domain, hot air balloons cannot travel within 25 km of the DMZ.

== Effectiveness and outcomes ==
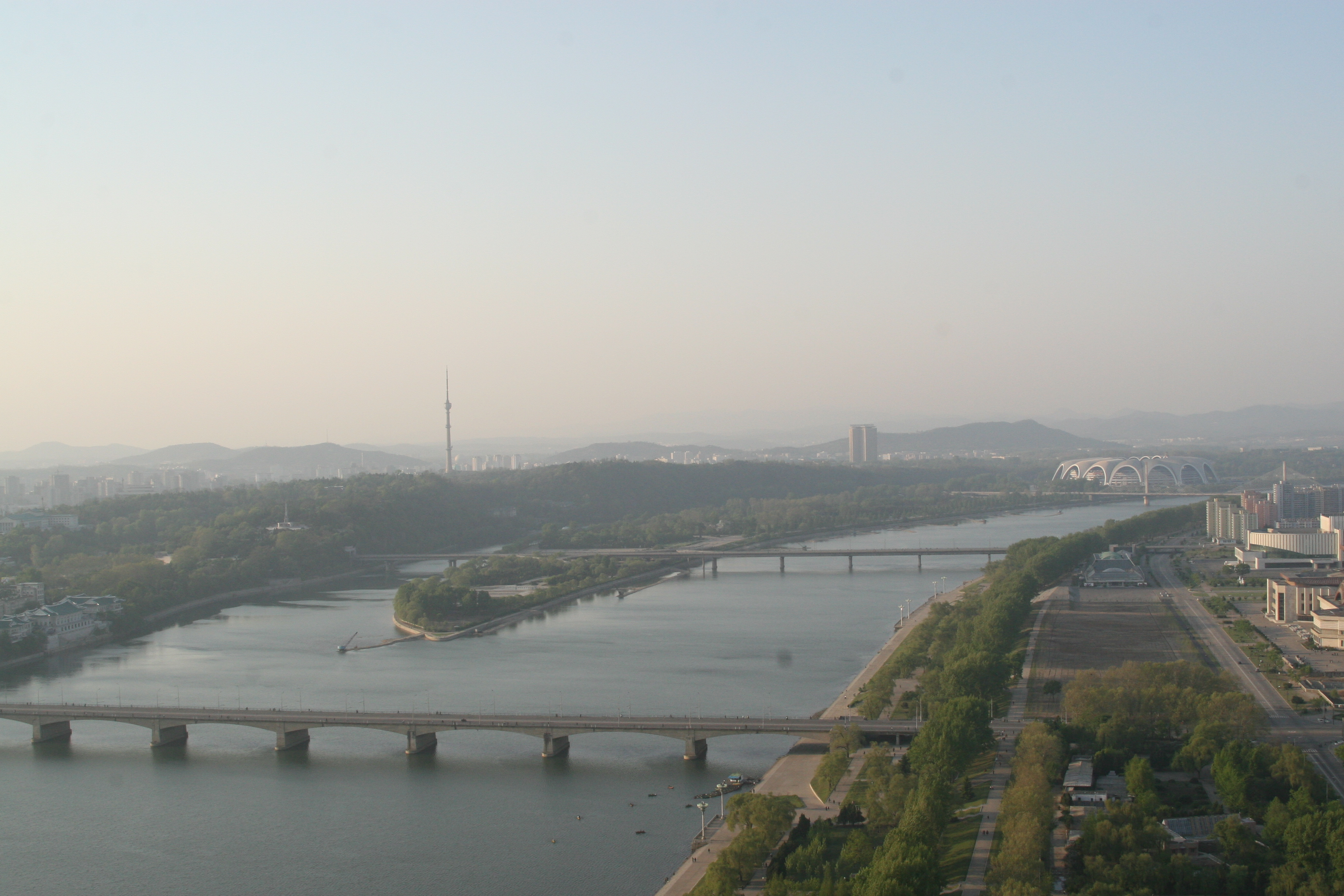
Some activists claim they can reach Pyongyang (pictured) with their balloons.

Multiple organizations involved in the campaigns are in competition with each other as they try to acquire financing for their actions. Ideological differences and different motivations between secular and Christian activists have also caused mutual resentment. Controversially, some organizations have been accused of lying about their leaflets reaching North Korea by a North Korean defector and Evangelical Christian Lee Min-bok, who is a leading figure in the leafletting along with Park Sang-Hak. He accused other organizations of launching balloons from Imjingak even though it would be impossible to reach North Korea's capital, Pyongyang, from there. He suspects that the balloons would fly to the Sea of Japan or, at best, to the mountains in the Kangwon province. He criticized them for trying to get media attention to increase funding. One such launch suspected to be promoting fundraising was made on 19 January 2015 by Human Rights Foundation and Fighters for a Free North Korea. Kim Hueng-kang from North Korea Intellectuals Solidarity says that the balloons are good for pressuring North Korea, even though they tend to fall near the DMZ due to the winds, where there are mostly soldiers to see the leaflets. Park Sang-hak has retained confidence in the balloons, as he says that hundreds of defectors have told to him about having been reached by the leaflets. Lee Min-bok has said that "[t]he balloon launch is a primitive humanitarian activity for human rights, which opens eyes, ears and mouths of North Korean people that have been closed by the North Korean regime". Lee Min-bok also downplayed the chance of war breaking out as a result of the balloon launches.

The Christian organizations have also had their motives questioned. The Christian activists have been accused of being more interested in proselytizing than actually saving people. For instance, a balloon landing on the roof of a farmer's house could bring trouble to the family. Furthermore, Christian literature is an especially dangerous material to have in North Korea. Korean American missionary Douglas Shin has said that Christians have picked up a banner to help North Koreans, and that "some people don't like using the word crusade, but that's exactly what this is—a crusade to liberate North Korea". South Korean and U.S. officials and analysts agree that the effects of missionary work are difficult to assess. Furthermore, they say that changing North Korea through religion is very difficult.

Jin-Heon Jung reports that a North Korean ex-intelligence agent, Lee Min-bok, told that soldiers indeed liked to see pornographic South Korean pictures; however, they saw it as a sign that the South Korean capitalist society was a completely rotten one. Another North Korean having served as a soldier recalled that he felt disgusted by the pictures. Other ex-soldiers like Lim Young-sun, who runs the online television channel Unification Broadcasting, which shows North Korean propaganda to help in understanding the culture of the North, have stated that the leaflets and contents like candy dropped on the North Korean soil actually calmed their initial hostility towards the South Koreans. The New York Times reported in 2016 that there has been no reliable study on how many North Koreans read the leaflets, or how they react on them. In comparison, South Korean people are known to mostly ignore North Korean leaflets.

Professor Andrei Lankov of Kookmin University thinks that leaflets that can only contain a relatively short text are unlikely to convince their readers and as such are ineffective in comparison to, for instance, radio programs. Professor Lee Jung-hoon from Yonsei University is not convinced that an organization such as North Korean People's Liberation Front is able to truly destabilize the North Korean regime, whatever methods they used, as they would have challenges trying to infiltrate North Korean society and posing as an alternative to the regime.

Professor Lee Woo-young of the University of North Korean Studies questions how it would be possible to demand North Korea to stop its hostile actions, as sending leaflets across the border is a violation of the Inter-Korean Basic Agreement from 1992. In the Inter-Korean Basic Agreement, both governments agreed to stop hostile actions against each other.

Suzanne Scholte of the Defense Forum Foundation, an organization which advocates for Sahrawi self-determination and North Korean human rights, has called the balloons "nuclear missile[s] of truth and hope for North Korean people".

Director John Feffer from Foreign Policy in Focus argues that the activists should learn from the Polish "self-limiting revolution" (the Second Solidarity) in 1988–1989, as pushing one's own government too hard can be harmful to the cause. He criticizes the activists for making maximalist claims about the smuggled information, and for refusing to compromise, as they try to reach their goals. Feffer considers the activists' actions to be harmful because they put human lives in danger, harm inter-Korean dialogue and harm the democratic legitimacy of the South Korean state.

However, the launching of balloons has provoked North Korea to threaten activists by warning that it would shell the areas with balloon launches. In October 2014, the North Korean border guards' attempt to shoot down some of the balloons led to a firefight due to North Korean shots landing near a South Korean military base and a residential area. A North Korean spy was arrested in 2011 and accused of trying to assassinate balloon campaign activist Park Sang-hak. In 2014, a North Korean agent posing as a defector was arrested for reportedly attempting to assassinate Choi Jung-hoon, another activist involved in the balloon drops and the commander of the North Korean People's Liberation Front. Jin-Heon Jung points out that the DMZ has become more militarized in recent years. The balloons may contribute to a decay of the remaining cooperation between the Korean governments; activists have been blamed of eagerly trying to destroy any cooperation between the governments.

== See also ==
- Cyberactivism in North Korea
- Daeseong-dong
- Free North Korea Radio
- Human rights in North Korea
- List of American and British defectors in the Korean War
- National Committee for a Free Europe sent leaflets with balloons from West Germany to the Eastern Bloc countries.
- Operation Moolah
- Peace Village (North Korea)
- Second Taiwan Strait Crisis § Aftermath, a similar long lasting psychological warfare involving leaflets and originating from the Cold War era
