= Portable DVD player =

Type of DVD player

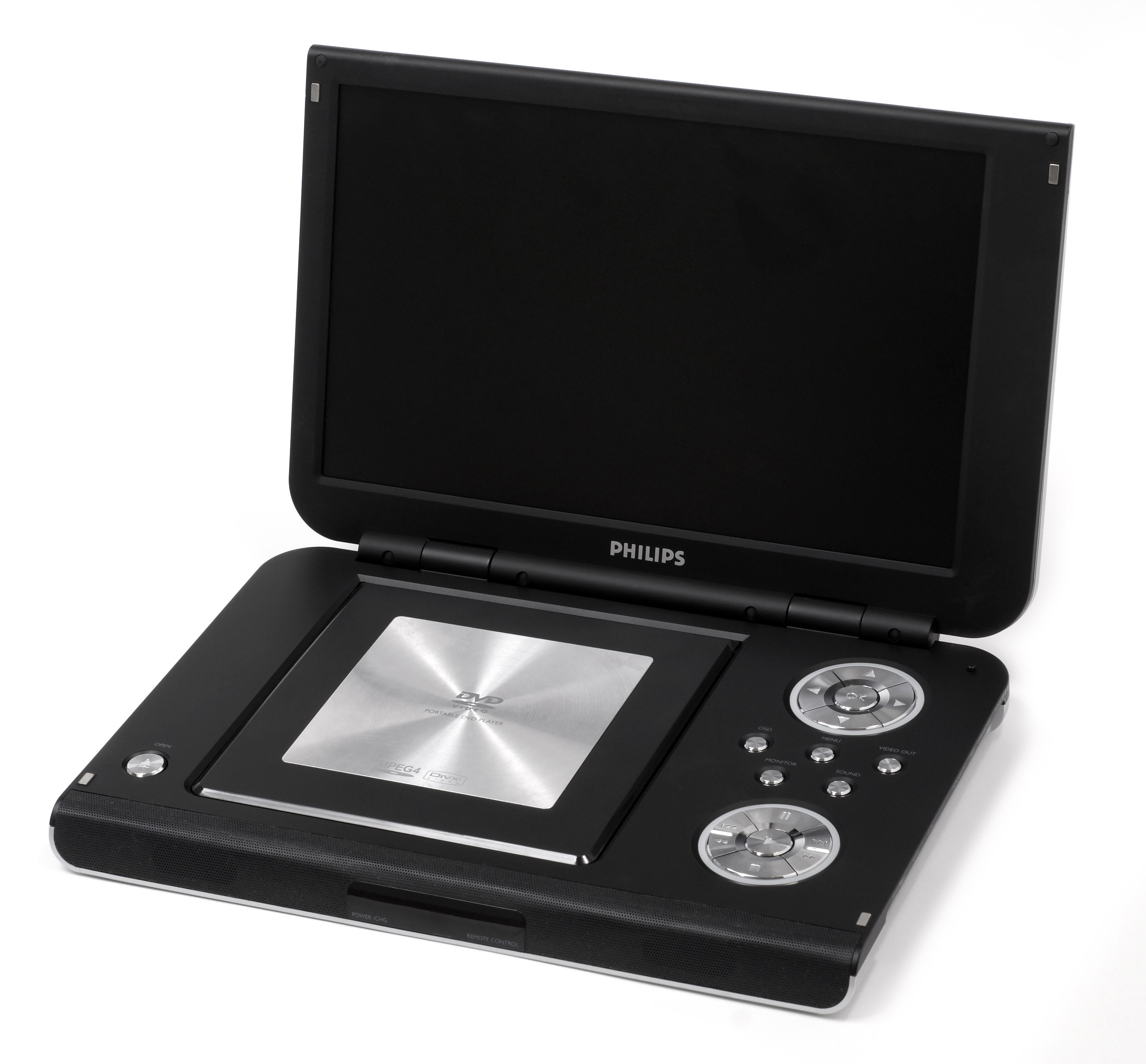
A Philips portable DVD player

A portable DVD player is a mobile, battery powered DVD player in the format of a mobile device. Many recent players play files from USB flash drives and SD cards.

== History ==
The first portable DVD player was introduced in 1998 with the Panasonic DVD-L10. They are made to be used when traveling. Many are able to perform secondary functions such as playing music from audio CDs and displaying images from digital cameras or camcorders.

== Impact ==
The popularity of low-cost battery powered portable DVD players in North Korea allows families to watch Chinese and South Korean programs on SD cards and USB flash drives. North Korean defectors run activist groups, such as Fighters for a Free North Korea that smuggle DVDs and SD cards into the country "to introduce North Koreans to the rest of the world". Activist groups planned to distribute DVD copies of The Interview via balloon drops. The balloon drop was postponed after the North Korean government referred to the plan as a de facto "declaration of war."

== Design ==
Most PDPs use TFT LCD, some using LED backlighting. The most common PDP screen size is 7 inches (18 cm), although some are as large as 10 to 12 inches (25 to 30 cm) - the larger size competing with tablet computers. The battery weight and need for portability presented problems - including problems with mechanical shocks interrupting the reading of the DVD. Some have articulating screens that rotate 180 degrees and fold flat. Portable DVD players generally have connections for additional screens and a car lighter plug.

Some PDPs had iPod docks, USB and SD card slots built in. Some can play videos in other formats such as MP4, DivX, either from CDs, flash memory cards or USB external hard disks, and some DVD players had USB video recorder.

Additional features found on PDPs include:

- Wi-Fi access, allowing it to play Internet TV.
- Bluetooth, allowing users to play content from or to other devices like smartphonegame consoles.
- The ability to display more than just video DVDs, such as other video formats, image formats and music formats
- A built-in digital TV tuner, so you can watch digital TV on the go.

=== Price range ===
Prices of portable DVD players vary, usually retailing for about US$40–300. When first released, portable DVD players would retail at over $1,000 and were only manufactured in Japan. Price drops in 2015 have led to some devices being retailed for as little as $48 to $50.

== See also ==
- Portable CD player
- Digital television
- In car entertainment
- Handheld television
- Notel
- Television set
- Video Walkman
