= North Korean People's Liberation Front =

South Korean paramilitary organization

- Dates active: 9 September 2010 – present
- Active regions: Korean peninsula and Chinese border
- Ideology: Anti-communism
- Status: Active
- Size: 100–330

- North Korean People's Liberation Front
- Hangul: 북한 인민해방전선
- Hanja: 北韓 人民解放戰線
- Revised Romanization: Bukhan Inmin Haebangjeonseon
- McCune–Reischauer: Pukhan Inmin Haebangjŏnsŏn

North Korean People's Liberation Front (NKPLF; Korean: 북한 인민해방전선) is a South Korean militant paramilitary organization consisting of North Korean defectors, formed by former defecting members of the Korean People's Army, planning to overthrow the North Korean government and replace it with the government based in Seoul. It is based in Seoul.

It claims to have prepared to give armed support for a possible uprising against the North Korean regime. Many of its current activities have been limited to information warfare including balloon drops, and smuggling various kinds of media to North Korea. The North Korean People's Liberation Front is also smuggling information out of North Korea. They have repeatedly petitioned to join the South Korean military. It works together with many other activist defector NGOs including Free North Korea Radio to achieve a regime change in North Korea.

The North Korean People's Liberation Front announced a plan in 2012 to launch a political party.

== History ==
The North Korean People's Liberation Front was founded on 9 September 2010.

The North Korean People's Liberation Front includes both officers and enlisted soldiers as well as special forces soldiers, and cyberwarfare and propaganda specialists. Historically, most of the organized North Korean domestic dissent has been involving military members.

North Korean People's Liberation Front has been called the most militant defectors' organization. They are preparing to cross the border to North Korea, and take arms, in a case of an uprising against the North Korean government. However, the North Korean People's Liberation Front is not the only group of defectors or North Korean military members to have planned starting an armed insurgency against the North Korean government. An earlier attempt by defectors to start an armed fight against the North Korean state was stopped by South Korean and Chinese officials. Members of the North Korean People's Liberation Front often dress in camouflage uniforms, sunglasses and berets and carry plastic weapons in public rallies. The uniforms are similar to the ones used by South Korean special forces. The group has petitioned the South Korean government to allow them to form their own army division.

== Current activities ==
North Korean People's Liberation Front primarily engages in information warfare rather than overt actions to topple the government. They smuggle information in and out of North Korea. This includes participating in balloon drops. Balloon drops — containing candy, pornographic pictures and propaganda leaflets — were previously performed by the South Korean government, but since the Sunshine Policy under the Kim Dae-jung administration, the balloon drops have been done only unofficially under human rights and defector groups. While releasing balloons is not illegal, the South Korean government often tries to stop balloon releases. Other activities of the North Korean People's Liberation Front include firing squad stage performances of the Kim family members, and smuggling various kinds of media across the North Korean border through China. For instance, in 2014, they claimed to have sent 6,000 laptops to North Korea, and in early 2015, they smuggled 800 copies of The Interview into North Korea across the border. In 2010, they uncovered an alleged plan by the North Korean National Security Council to disrupt the G20 summit in Seoul.

In 2012, they announced their intentions to launch a political party in South Korea.

== Viewpoints ==
=== Korean studies scholarship's analysis ===
North Korean People's Liberation Front claims that it has support and contacts within disaffected officers of the Korean People's Army, but analysts are not convinced of this. They also claim to have contacts within the police of North Korea. Hankuk University of Foreign Studies professor Namkung Young says that members of the organization know the North Korean situation well, but they should be more realistic with their goals. Furthermore, he noted that South Korean support for the organization could increase tensions between the two governments. A U.S. military analyst was unaware of any independent sources supporting the claims that the North Korean military would be discontent enough to attempt a coup.

North Korea analyst Andrei Lankov of Kookmin University warned that if the group would be allowed into the South Korean military, it would be seen legitimately as a provocation by the North, and that ideologically high motivation might make them too unpredictable. In the past, both Koreas trained defectors as infiltrators. According to Lankov, there are concerns that defectors and refugees may include spies. Park Dae-gook, a former North Korean army officer, argued that serving as soldiers would be the best way to prove loyalty to South Korea, and that defectors would have psychological advantage over the South Korean military.

Yonsei University professor Jung Hoon Lee was sceptical about North Korean People's Liberation Front's ability to destabilize the North Korean government, whatever plans they used. However, he conceded that North Korean People's Liberation Front's decision and timing, in 2012, to launch a political party was significant due to power being moved from Kim Jong Il to his successor Kim Jong Un. Secondly, a provisional government formed outside North Korea could give impression of alternatives.

=== Positions of the North Korean People's Liberation Front ===
Jang Se-yul supported the claims that the North Korean state was behind the Sony hacking incident. He cautioned that the U.S. should take the North Korean cyberwarfare threat more seriously.

North Korean People's Liberation Front member Kim Seong-min believes that three companies of ex-military members could be serving in the South Korean military, if South Korea allowed them to officially join the military. Approximately 3,000 — out of 20,000 defectors — North Koreans with a military background live in South Korea.

North Korean People's Liberation Front plans to topple the North Korean government by working together with other anti-regime groups and contacts within North Korea.

Defector and member Park Dae-gook complained that South Koreans are suspicious of defectors, thinking that they may again betray their new homeland, and reaffirmed defectors' will to enlist in the South Korean military.

=== North Korean reactions ===
The regime takes Choi Jung-hoon's activities seriously. In 2014, a North Korean agent posing as a defector was caught by South Korean security services. Her task was to lure Choi Jung-hoon to China to be assassinated. His younger brother was executed for anti-regime activities in November 2000.

North Korea has repeatedly threatened defectors and activists involved in the balloon releases. The North Korean government has also been accused of sponsoring counter-protesters.

== Leadership and prominent members ==
Choi Jung-hoon is the leader of the group. He is also Free North Korea Radio's broadcasting director. He defected in 2007. He is reportedly under protection by the South Korean Intelligence Agency, like many other activist defectors.

Jang Se-yul studied in Mirim University, and subsequently served as a hacker for the North Korean military. He computerized military strategies and gathered intelligence on enemy tactics. He defected in the late 2000s. He claims to still have contacts with hackers from North Korea's General Bureau of Reconnaissance, and within its subdivision Bureau 121.

== See also ==
- Fighters for a Free North Korea
- Free Joseon
- Korean nationalism
- North Korean infiltration tunnels
- North Korea Intellectuals Solidarity
- Park Sang-hak
