= NKFC =

NKFC may refer to:

- Nong Khai F.C., a football club based in Nong Khai, Thailand
- North Korea Freedom Coalition, an organisation for human rights in North Korea
