= Rigveda Wiki =

Korean wiki website

- Website type: Wiki
- Available in: Korean
- Owners: Cheongdong (청동), Hamjang (함장)
- Creator: Hamjang (함장)
- Website: rigvedawiki.net
- Commercial: No (nominally); Yes (legal status)
- Registration: Optional
- Launched: 1 March 2007; 19 years ago
- Current status: Offline
- Content license: CC-BY-NC-SA 2.0 South Korea
- Written in: PHP

Rigveda Wiki (Korean: 리그베다 위키), commonly known as Enhawiki (엔하위키), is a Korean otaku wiki which started on March 1, 2007. As of July 17, 2013, it had more than 200,000 articles, making it the fourth-largest Korean-language wiki, following Korean Wikipedia, Korean Wiktionary and the Namuwiki, forked of Rigveda Wiki. It focuses on a wide range of topics.

Though the official name of the wiki was "Rigveda Wiki", the vast majority of users accessed the articles through pre-popularized Enhawiki Mirror, and most did not know that the official website "Rigveda Wiki" existed, and also ranked low on search engines such as Naver and Daum.

After April 2015, almost all users left Rigveda Wiki and moved to Namuwiki, a fork which used the same CC-BY-NC-SA 2.0 South Korea license. RigvedaWiki closed in 2022.

== History ==
The wiki was launched as Angelhalo Wiki, abbreviated as Enhawiki, in 2007.

On August 2, 2013, Rigveda Wiki opened its beta service, and the layout of the website was changed. Since then, people have been able to use Rigveda Wiki from mobile devices.

As of December 2014, the front page of the website advertised three main avenues of participation: a wiki, a web forum or BBS (wikibbs) and an Android app. The front page of the wiki advertised the site as running on muniwiki, a fork of MoinMoin, and as having a CC-BY-NC-SA 2.0 South Korea license. As of June 2015, only the wiki section was in the front page.

The site was offline between April 25, 2015, and May 17, 2015, due to controversies between the site owner and the community about the copyright status of the wiki. When the website came back online, only owners and registered users could contribute.

After April 2015, almost all users left Rigveda Wiki and moved to Namuwiki, a fork which used the same CC-BY-NC-SA 2.0 South Korea license. This is considered one of the biggest forks in the history of wikis.

== Features ==
Rigveda Wiki is a wiki system open for contributions by both registered and unregistered users (recorded by their IP address). Its policies are more permissive than Wikipedia's and allow personal opinions as well. As a result, Rigveda Wiki has many articles about pop culture topics such as cartoons, animations, games, and television programs. It has a board for discussing, questioning, and answering subjects relevant to articles.

Rigveda Wiki can have strikethrough or deletion lines. This is a line in the middle of text that means 'whispering', or something a person wants to say but not have high visibility.

== Wiki Neet ==
This term is used to describe people who spend a lot of time in Rigveda Wiki. It includes people who think that they do not have any special purpose in their lives and spend their time just doing nothing.

== Preserving memory ==
Rigveda Wiki also serves as a place to preserve social memories. For example, the sinking of the MV Sewol, on 16 April 2014, was deemed an unforgettable accident by some South Koreans. Rigveda Wiki was one of the websites where people recorded their thoughts on the incident. In one week 34,000 words were added to the related article on the wiki.

== See also ==
- List of wikis
