= Park Sang-hak =

North Korean defector

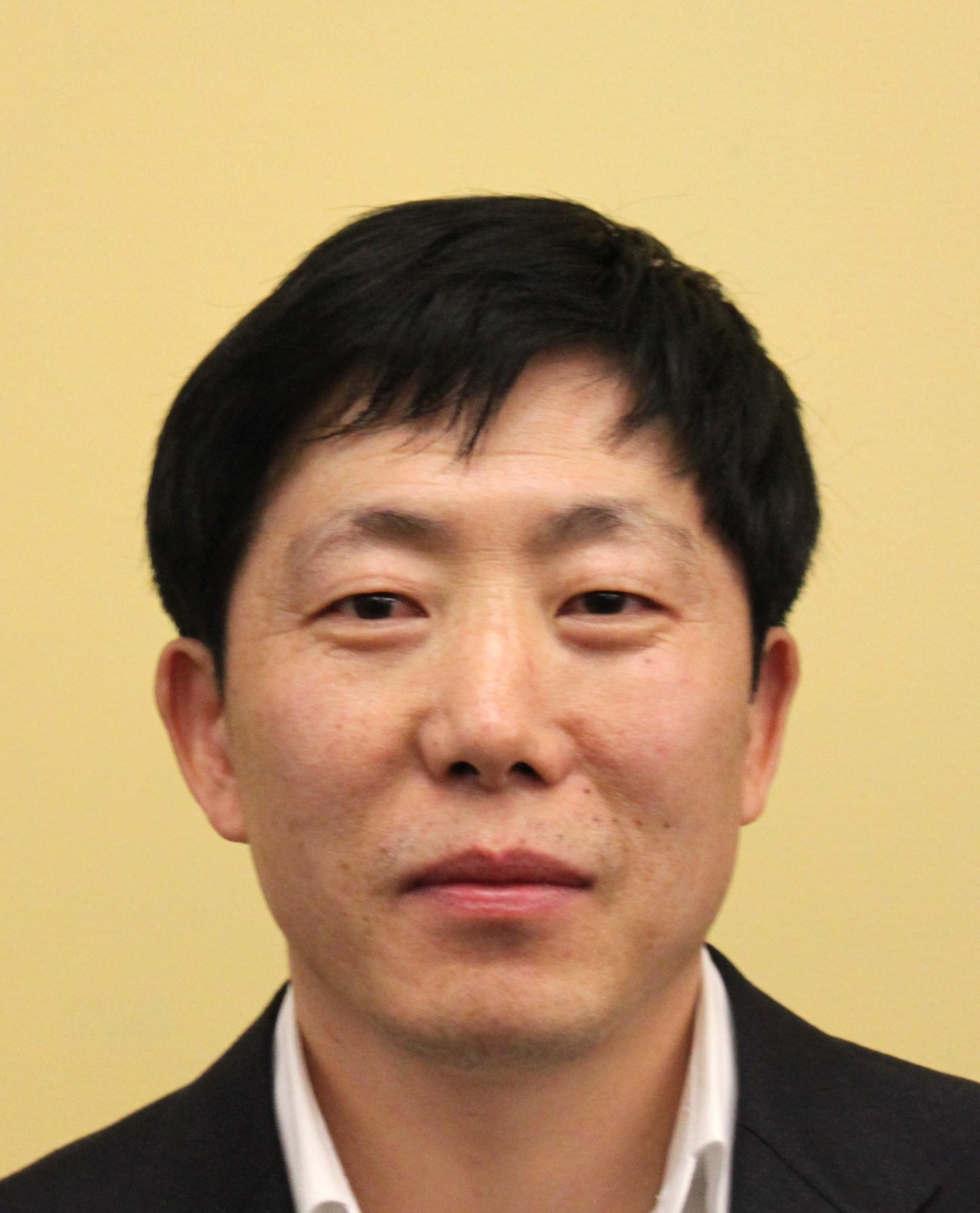
- Park Sang-hak (2014)
- Born: February 16, 1968 (age 57); Hyesan, North Korea
- Education: Kim Chaek University of Technology
- Occupation: Activist
- Known for: Founder of Fighters for a Free North Korea

- Park Sang-hak
- Hangul: 박상학
- RR: Bak Sanghak
- MR: Pak Sanghak

Park Sang-hak is a North Korean democracy activist and is the chairman of Fighters for a Free North Korea. Park Sang-hak is a hard-line anti-communist and supporter of the conservative movement in South Korea.

== Life in North Korea ==
Born in 1968 at Hyesan, Park grew up in a privileged family in North Korea. Park Sang-hak attended the Kim Chaek University of Technology, studying IT. After graduating, he worked at Kim Il Sung Youth Alliance. He met with other members of the community every Monday for political classes and Saturday self-criticism sessions.

Park's grandmother, returning from a rare visit to Japan, told of how much happier people were in other countries. He began to hear from fellow students, who had been chosen to study in other communist countries, share stories of the outside world. He discovered people in Europe did not have to do self-criticisms each week, which had been a great source of stress. Yet, he still had no desire to leave. He continued to work in Kim Il Sung Youth Alliance, got a girlfriend, and got engaged. He was preparing for his planned wedding.

Then one day in the summer of 1997, Park received a message from a Chinese man. He had come on behalf of Park's father, who was in Japan working for the government. His father realized the family was in danger, and he wanted them to leave. His father discovered the scale of the famine in North Korea. Fearing fresh purges of officials in the Workers' Party, he sent for his family to leave. Suspecting a trap, Park demanded proof from the Chinese man, such as pictures of his father. It took two months for this to be arranged.

== Defection to South Korea ==
Once they had proof, Park took his mother, brother, and sister and headed for China. After bribing North Korean guards to look the other way, Park and his brother swam across a river into China, while their mother and sister floated across the river using an inner tube. They were picked up on the other side of the border by a car, as arranged by his father, and the whole family flew on false passports to South Korea.

When he came to South Korea, he enrolled at Seoul National University. He was able to study different political theories. He was able to compare the North Korean system to the democratic system of the South. He restudied Kim Il Sung and Kim Jong Il and also studied South Korean presidents Syngman Rhee and Park Chung Hee. He could have lived comfortably as a researcher at the Mobile Institute, but he felt some responsibility. He felt as an intellectual he had responsibility to be a part of this movement. The reason why he engaged in these activities was because he was angry at the North Korean system.

During an interview with the George W. Bush Institute's "Freedom Collection", Park claims that in 2003 he learnt that his fiancée had been beaten so badly, she was left unrecognizable, and that his two uncles were beaten to death, and his cousins were stripped of their wealth, reducing them to street beggars. Park also claims that his relatives were found guilty by association and therefore punished. Park claims that these experiences left him angry, leading to him quitting his job and becoming an activist.

== Activism ==
In 2006, Park became the chairman of the Democracy Network against North Korea Gulag. As of 2013, he is the chairman of Fighters for a Free North Korea.

In April 2015 Park was detained, as protestors clashed with South Korean police over their attempts to airlift thousands of copies of The Interview into North Korea.

In July 2020, Park authored an op-ed in The Washington Post, alleging harassment by the Moon Jae-in administration. He wrote that his home address had been leaked, his bank accounts investigated, and that he had been banned from international travel by the South Korean government in response to his human rights advocacy. Park wrote, "In the hope of appeasing the North, Moon is impeding the work of activists fighting the North's human rights violations." Following this article, Park received support from international human rights groups, including the North Korea Freedom Coalition, which called on the Moon administration to end its "harassment" of Park. Park's supporters noted that the Moon administration's actions appeared to conflict with the International Covenant on Civil and Political Rights, of which South Korea is signatory.

=== Fighters for a Free North Korea ===
Fighters for a Free North Korea is known for periodically launching balloons carrying human rights and pro-democracy literature, DVDs, transistor radios and USB flash drives from South Korea into North Korea. Over two million such balloons have been launched. The balloons, which generally reach the Pyongyang area after three to four hours in the air, are timed to release their materials in the Pyongyang area.

According to The Wall Street Journal, supporters of the balloon campaign say that it "is one of the most effective tools for change inside North Korea, where information about the outside world is highly restricted". Critics of the campaign, reported the Journal, "oppose the move for causing inter-Korean frictions".

Park and his colleagues released balloons containing leaflets from Ganghwa, an island off the west coast of South Korea, in October 2012, shortly after being prevented by authorities from releasing them from Paju, their usual launch site, which North Korea had threatened to fire upon if the balloon release went forward.

=== Assassination attempt ===
In September 2011, a North Korean defector called Ahn was arrested in Seoul by members of the National Intelligence Service on his way to meet with Park, referred to as "Enemy Zero" by the Pyongyang regime. South Korean authorities said that he had planned to kill Park either by poisoning his drink or by jabbing him with a poisoned needle. Park said that the assassin, Ahn, had phoned him earlier and asked to meet him. "Ahn told me by phone", Park said, "that he was to be accompanied by a visitor from Japan who wants to help our efforts. But then I was told by the NIS not to go to the meeting due to the risk of assassination".

The Independent of London noted that Ahn "could face the death penalty" under South Korea's National Security Law, but he ended up being sentenced to four years in prison. He was also ordered to pay 11.75 million Won in fines (about US$10,000), which was the same amount he had been promised for assassinating Park. The Independent also pointed out that the assassination plot was "reminiscent of the Cold War killing of Bulgarian dissident Georgi Markov, who was stabbed with a ricin-tipped umbrella in London in 1978."

In an interview in June 2020 with Foreign Policy, Park said, "It is said that the tree of peace lives off blood and that freedom is not free. Somebody has to sacrifice themselves, so if I'm killed by Kim Jong Un's gun, it'll be an honor."

== Controversy ==
In 2007, he was expelled from the Network for North Korean Democracy and Human Rights for embezzlement of public funds and focus on violent protests during his time as one of the heads of the organization.

He appeared at far-right internet forum Ilbe Storehouse and he declared himself to be an Ilbe member in 2013. He supported far-right pastor Jeon Kwang-hoon and attended Jeon's National Revolutionary Party inauguration ceremony.

He was charged on November 25, 2020, with beating and throwing bricks at producers and crew from the Seoul Broadcasting System and firing a tear gas gun at police officers on June 23. Court sentenced him to 1 year and 6 months in prison and 3 years of probation in the 2nd trial which gave a harsher sentencing compared to the 1st trial's 8 months prison and 2 year probation due to the severity of the crime.

He was charged in 2020 for illegal fundraising where he was accused of raising 170 million won between 2016 and 2020 without properly reporting the donations for Fighters for a Free North Korea. He was fined 3 million won and 1 year of probation in 2022.

== Awards and honors ==
In May 2013, Park was presented with the Václav Havel Prize for Creative Dissent by the Human Rights Foundation.
