= Fighters for a Free North Korea =

South Korean human rights organization

Fighters for a Free North Korea (FFNK, Korean: 자유북한운동연합) is an organization formed in South Korea that is known for periodically launching balloons carrying human rights and pro-democracy literature, DVDs, transistor radios and USB flash drives from South Korea into North Korea. Over two million such balloons have been launched. The balloons, which generally reach their destination area after three to four hours in the air, are timed to release their materials in the Pyongyang area.

== Balloon drops ==
A principal method of getting news and arts from the outside world into the so-called "hermit kingdom" of North Korea has been the use of airdrops of materials that have been flown over the border by balloon. The balloons are hydrogen gas balloons that carry a wide range of materials such as transistor radios, entertainment DVDs and brochures. The materials sent are "intended to introduce North Koreans to the rest of the world". The popularity of low cost battery powered Portable DVD players in North Korea allows families to watch Chinese and South Korean programs on SD cards and USB flash drives.

According to The Wall Street Journal in 2013, supporters of the balloon campaign say that it "is one of the most effective tools for change inside North Korea, where information about the outside world is highly restricted". Critics of the campaign, reported the Journal, "oppose the move for causing inter-Korean frictions".

Some balloon drops have been interrupted by South Korean authorities. In October 2012, Park Sang-hak and his colleagues released balloons containing leaflets from Ganghwa, an island off the west coast of South Korea, shortly after being prevented by authorities from releasing them from Paju, their usual launch site, which North Korea had threatened to fire upon if the balloon release went forward.

In December 2020, South Korea's National Assembly passed a law that penalizes South Korean activists who send anti-North Korean material across the border. Park Sang-hak, the chairman of Fighters For A Free North Korea, has said that he's "disappointed" about the new law and believes it "calls South Korea's commitment to democracy into question." In September 2023, South Korea's Constitutional Court struck down the law citing concerns about free speech.

== Partnership organizations ==
FFNK has partnered with the Human Rights Foundation on activities to get liberty-oriented materials across the border and into North Korea since 2013. Drops have included offline copies of the Korean Wikipedia on a bootable USB memory device.

Following an international geopolitical controversy in December 2014, both organizations had planned to obtain DVD copies of The Interview—whose Christmas 2014 theatrical release was initially canceled, and then released to independent and arthouse cinemas as well as online—and move them across the border and into North Korea via balloon drops. The balloon drop was postponed after the North Korean government referred to the plan as a de facto "declaration of war."

North Korea Intellectuals Solidarity is another human rights organization that works with FFNK in moving contraband material into North Korea. Methods of getting the materials into the hands of North Korean citizens include standing on the South Korean side of a border river and throwing "bins packed with contraband toward the North Korean side, where someone will wade into the river to retrieve the bins then quickly change clothes, because soldiers are trained to shoot anyone in the area with wet clothing because it is an indication they are engaging in illegal activity".

== See also ==
- Free Joseon
- Free North Korea Radio
- North Korean People's Liberation Front
- Park Sang-hak
- Cyberactivism in North Korea
