= Namuwiki =

Korean wiki website based in Paraguay

- English version of the logo
- Website type: Wiki
- Available in: Korean, English, Japanese
- Headquarters: Asunción, Paraguay
- Owner: Umanle S.R.L.
- Creators: namu, PPPP, kasio
- Website: namu.wiki
- Commercial: Yes
- Registration: Optional
- Launched: 17 April 2015; 11 years ago
- Content license: CC-BY-NC-SA 2.0 KR

Namuwiki (Korean: 나무위키; lit. 'tree wiki') is a Korean-language wiki, or collaboratively edited website, based in Paraguay. It was launched on April 17, 2015, and is powered by the proprietary wiki software called the Seed.

According to The Korea Economic Daily, in 2021 Namuwiki had a maximum daily user count of 2 million, and a maximum daily page view count of 45 million, making it the 7th most visited website in South Korea. In 2024, The Hankyoreh reported that Namuwiki had 2.2 times more articles and 7.2 times more traffic than the Korean Wikipedia, while Similarweb ranked it as the fifth most visited website in South Korea.

== History ==
In April 2015, Rigveda Wiki, a Korean otaku wiki which started in 2007, suffered a massive community dispute when the site owner, Cheongdong, was discovered to have secretly changed the user agreement to privatize the wiki for his personal profit. Users vandalized articles in protest, forcing the closure of the servers. Namuwiki emerged as one of the biggest wikis forked from the Rigveda Wiki, and soon became its de facto replacement.

On 9 January 2019, Korean politician, Cho Hae-joo, formally announced that he had deleted material written on his Namuwiki page, as it contained "false elements", which resulted in political backlash.

In November 2023, the Democratic Party accused then president Yoon Suk Yeol of "preparing for martial law" on the basis of 130 officers deleting their Namuwiki pages. In a press conference, Democratic Party Member of Parliament, Yang Mun-suk said: "130 officers of the Republic of Korea Armed Forces have deleted or have taken the preemptive actions for the removal of their Namuwiki pages since last April. I have strong suspicions that these actions are not just flying rumors but preparations for emergencies such as martial law." During the 2024 South Korean legislative election, Jang Ye-chan, a former member of the People Power Party (PPP) supreme council, was dropped from nominations by the PPP due to inappropriate remarks he made that were shared on his Namuwiki article.

=== Scrutiny by the Korea Communications Standards Commission, 2024 ===
In August 2024, the Korea Communications Standards Commission (KCSC) made a decision to devise regulatory measures for Namuwiki based on the complaints of two indivudals requesting removal of inflammatory personal information. In the past, the KCSC's Communcations Review Subcommittee had typically ruled people's request for the removal of private information from Namuwiki as not applicable for regulatory action. However, according to MBN's article, members newly decided that the former standards were "Not in line with the trend of the times... It would be reasonable to accept the request for the deletion of information on sites such as Namuwiki if the person themselves requested it", and put the decision on hold.The KCSC planned to issue a recommendation for self-regulation to Namuwiki and intends to continue developing effective countermeasures.

On 16 October, the KCSC delivered a resolution of the 'blocking' (접속차단) of personal information of influencers on Namuwiki. The Special Committee for Telecommunication Consultations (통신자문특별위원회), accepting the pleas from two influencers, one saying that photos of the individual with his/her previous lover alongside photos of physical affection, or "스킨쉽", have been on Namuwiki for a long time, and the other saying that Namuwiki had the individual's "life contents from 2013 to 2023 in its articles, alongside the individual's photos, real name, birthplace/time, nationality, body measures, education, prizes and awards, and even family information", resolved that rectification was needed. The Special Committee for Telecommunication Consultations further stated that this was a "decision made in consideration of the rapid spread of Internet media and its increasing influence day by day", and that they were "applying the relevant regulations more strictly than before, reflecting the recent reality that can cause enormous damage to individuals by spreading unwanted portraits or privacy information."

Ryu Hee-lim (류희림), the current chairman of the Korea Communications Standards Commission, said "We have recently changed our reviewing standards and are now strongly requesting for deletion in the case of any privacy, portrait violation cases.", "if our rectification requests are not met in the future, we are considering a temporary complete-blockage."

According to the KCSC on 23 October, when one of the influencers mentioned above requested the deletion of a Namuwiki article with a photo of the individual with their ex, the publisher (게시자) removed it voluntarily. According to Yonhap (same article), the other influencer's family information was also taken down by Namuwiki. In an Hankyoreh article, it is said that on 29 October, a KCSC figure said, "if (Namuwiki) keeps idly ignoring our corrections, we can further resolute a 'Recommendation for Strengthening Self-Regulation' (자율규제 강화 권고) and a 'Warning' (경고), and if Namuwiki continues to not improve after our 'Warning', we can undergo a 'temporary complete-blockage' (일시적 전체 차단). We are currently trying to increase the effectiveness of our correction demands by increasing co-operation with Namuwiki, and will continue to respond appropriately as the situation develops.

Coincidentally, that afternoon (1 November), Namuwiki was temporarily unusable, with pages displaying this error message: "잠시 서버 작업이 진행되고 있거나, 일시적인 오류일 수 있습니다. 아래의 새로 고침 버튼을 눌러보세요" (The server might be undergoing management, or could be a temporary error. Try pressing the refresh button below). This succession of events led to the arousing suspicions of users regarding the reason why Namuwiki was unusable, with Kim Jang-Kyum's Namuwiki article itself later trending on 1 November. The temporary issue was fixed a few hours later. On 3 November, PPP legislator Kim Jang-Kyum (김장겸) launched the process for a law Korean news outlets dubbed the "Namuwiki transparency law" (나무위키 투명화법). The new law legislator Kim is pushing for is a revised bill for the Act on promotion of information and communications network utilization and information protection (정보통신망 이용촉진 및 정보보호 등에 관한 법률). According to Kim, the revisal's key elements are the reinforcing of Namuwiki's proxy body in Korea, and the introduction of a confiscation system for profits based on the distribution of illegal information. Furthermore, Kim says that they are pushing for a system where the domestic proxy requirements are expanded from current user count and revenue to encompassing other elements such as visits and traffic, with an addition of similar expansions for minor protection.

== Content ==
=== Articles ===
Content of Namuwiki is licensed under the Creative Commons Attribution-NonCommercial-ShareAlike 2.0 Korea (CC BY-NC-SA 2.0 license); they have explained that their license is incompatible with Wikipedia (CC BY-SA 4.0) and Fandom wiki (CC BY-SA 3.0 Unported) on the FAQ page.

=== Accuracy and neutrality ===
The phrase "turn off Namuwiki" (나무위키 꺼라) has become a running joke in many Korean internet communities, which targets its users who act knowledgeable about certain topics without doing in-depth and credible research outside of Namuwiki. Although cases where major media outlets uses information Namuwiki continue to emerge, it has also faced criticisms of being vulnerable to the weakness that information may be presented from a biased perspective and having laxer guidelines when compared to Wikipedia. For instance, it is only advised in Namuwiki that the sources are added. In 2016, a Namuwiki user created an article about "equalism"; it falsely claimed that a supposed new ideology, "equalism", had appeared in the West, and made multiple remarks against feminist ideologies. The article was used to criticize feminism on South Korean online communities, and was also posted by a member of the Korean Progressive Party. After 6 months, the equalism page was renamed into Namuwiki Gender Equalism Fabrication Incident.

== Administration ==
Umanle S.R.L.'s base of operation in Paraguay has led to concerns over the legal venues available for Korean citizens to seek correction of information they consider harmful, given the bureaucratic difficulties in handling legal matters with a foreign entity under foreign law. Even though not much information has been revealed about Umanle S.R.L., its employees, or its owner(s), data from Paraguay's Ministry of Finance confirms its existence; it rose concerns that Namuwiki may be operating under a ghost company.

== Reception and influence ==
According to Similarweb, Namuwiki is the 5th most visited website on the South Korean internet as of 5 October 2024, behind only the likes of Google, Naver, YouTube, and Daum. In addition, it is the most widely used wiki website by the Korean population, as well as the second most searched entity in 2015, according to Google Korea. Even though it have been criticized for lack of citations, inaccuracy and bias, editing policies has established its status as the go-to wiki website among the Korean population, which has boosted the website's status and influence into a staple of everyday Koreans' lives and pop culture. The Hankyoreh found that it has 7.2 times more traffic compared to the Korean Wikipedia, while The Korea Economic Daily observed that Namuwiki had a maximum daily user count of 2 million as well as a maximum daily pageview count of 45 million in 2021, making it the seventh most visited website in Korea that year.

In entertainment and politics, Namuwiki makes sporadic appearances in the scene, where sometimes readers can see Korean public figures, entertainers, and politicians reading Namuwiki's criticism section of their own articles like a politician spinoff of "reading mean comments". According to E-daily, public figures reading, reviewing, and editing their own Namuwiki articles have been an increasing trend on Korean YouTube. It has also come under pressure from various politicians and political organizations, while various efforts were either made or theorized against Namuwiki. Critics of these acts argued that the blocking or taking-down of Namuwiki would be unnecessary censorship and the hindrance of freedom of speech.

According to JoongAng Ilbo's call with the aids of the PPP's first-term MP's office (초선실), it is said that the PPP has separate designated assistants just for Namuwiki management. In March 2017, MK News detailed Namuwiki and the "humorous" writing style of its articles. In November 2018, Namuwiki was mentioned by Korean news outlet representative Junghwan Lee, as a positive example for news outlets to follow in the context of fake news, explaining that information contributed online from repeated discussion, deletion, and adjustments ultimately creates truthful information.

== See also ==
- List of wikis
- Korean Wikipedia
- Rigveda Wiki
- Subculture
- Lurkmore
- Encyclopedia Dramatica
- RationalWiki
- Uncyclopedia
- TV Tropes
