= Korean Demilitarized Zone loudspeakers =

Aspect of North–South Korea conflict

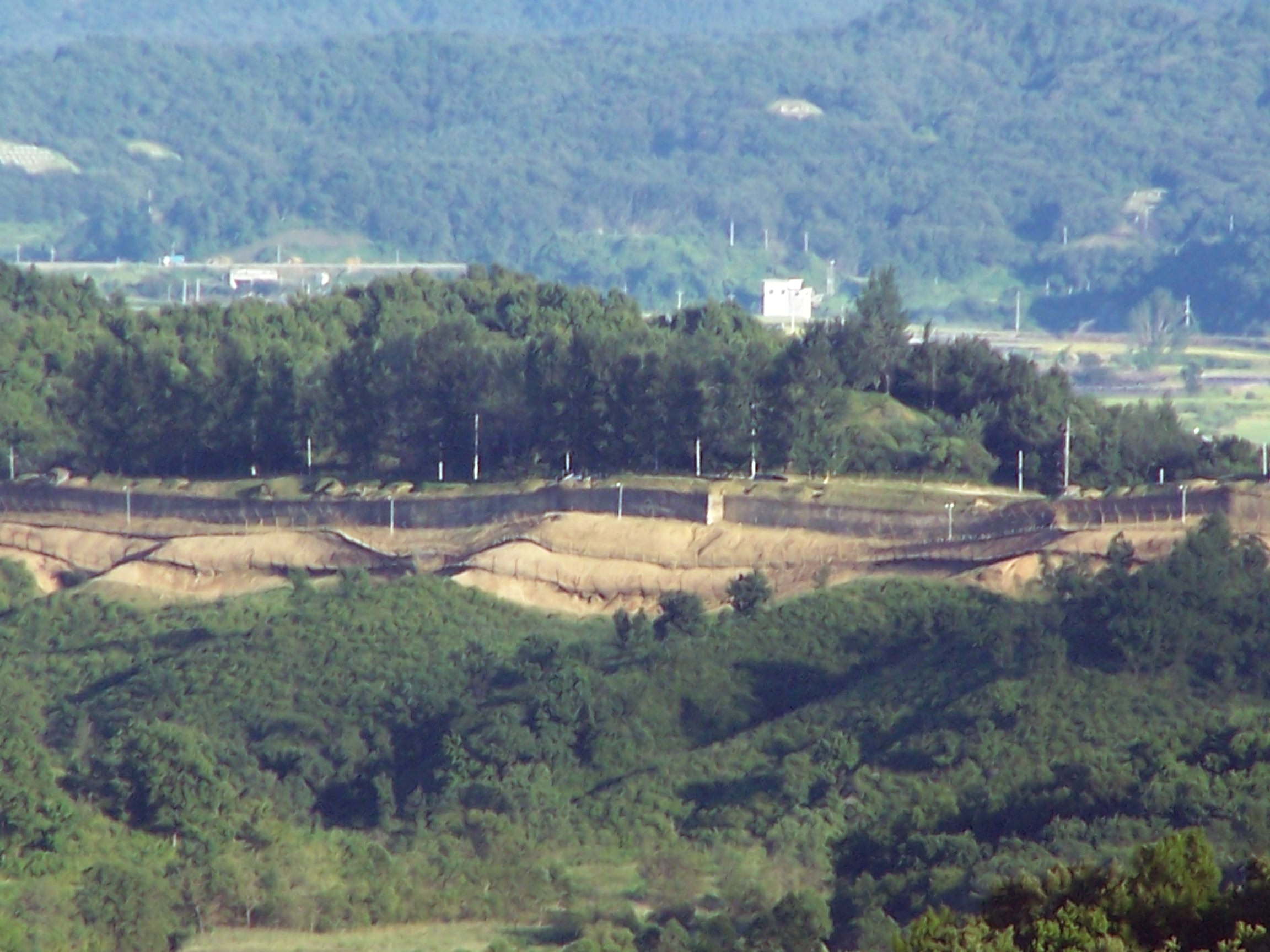
The Korean Demilitarized Zone between North Korea and South Korea, seen from the south

North Korea and South Korea—engaged in a low-level military conflict with each other since the Korean War ended in an armistice in 1953—are separated at their border by the Korean Demilitarized Zone (DMZ), along which both countries have broadcast various sounds on loudspeakers aimed at the other side. A form of psychological warfare, this has been dubbed the “Korean Loudspeaker War”.

There have been three periods in which the broadcasts have occurred, each time initiated by South Korea; their aim has been to encourage North Koreans to gain a liking for South Korea, as well as to respond to North Korean aggression without physically escalating the conflict. South Korea's speakers play propaganda and music, while North Korea's play general noises such as sirens and drums.

The United States, allied with South Korea during the Korean War, used loudspeaker broadcasts as psychological warfare on North Korean soldiers from 1950 to 1953. In 1963, South Korea began using speakers at the DMZ, and North Korea did the same later on. They both agreed to stop their broadcasts in 2004. In 2015, after an incident in which two South Korean soldiers on the DMZ were injured by a North Korean land mine, both broadcasts resumed. They were paused after a 2018 agreement. In 2024, after North Korea sent balloons filled with trash and manure over the DMZ, the broadcasts again resumed, and South Korea halted theirs in 2025.

== Background ==
In 1945, at the end of World War II, Korea—then a Japanese colony—was occupied by the Allies, who divided the country into North Korea, controlled initially by the Soviet Union; and South Korea, controlled initially by the United States. The North and South fought during the Korean War from 1950 to 1953, over whether the region should have a capitalist or communist economic system. North Korea was on the side of communism, and the South, capitalism.

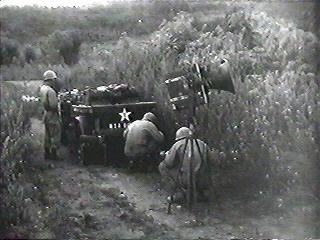
U.S. Army soldiers of the 1st Loudspeaker and Leaflet Company using a speaker to broadcast propaganda during the Korean War in 1953

During the war, the United States, allied with South Korea, used loudspeakers to broadcast propaganda to the North Koreans as a form of psychological warfare. In September 1950, the U.S.' Tactical Information Detachment (stationed at Fort Riley in Kansas) deployed to Korea as the 1st Loudspeaker and Leaflet Company, supporting to American units across the frontline. They operated until 1953.

The war ended in an armistice in 1953, without a peace treaty. The two countries ultimately bordered each other horizontally along the middle of the Korean peninsula. Since then, they have been a low-level military conflict. The border between them became the Demilitarized Zone (DMZ), a series of fortifications under continuous defense by both countries, and occupied by both soldiers at the Joint Security Area.

== Broadcasts ==
A map of the DMZ

North and South Korea's modern usage of loudspeakers at the DMZ has been nicknamed the "Korean Loudspeaker War". North Korean loudspeakers broadcast sirens, drum noises, and sounds described as "high-pitched and resembling scraping metal". Their broadcasts are quieter than South Korea's, possibly due to poor speakers. South Korea broadcasts government messages, world news and weather reports, and k-pop music, the latter of which is banned in North Korea under their law on "reactionary ideology and culture rejection". The South Korean government's messages include a program titled The Voice of Freedom, which list criticisms of the North Korean government and the positives of capitalism. It also contains threats towards the North Korean soldiers stationed on the DMZ. (Note: The Voice of Freedom is also available on South Korean radio on FM107.3.) K-pop that has played includes songs by Apink, BigBang, and IU.

Kim Sung-min, a South Korean man who broadcasts radio signals into North Korea, has said of the South's broadcasts: "These broadcasts play a role in instilling a yearning for the outside world, or in making them realize that the textbooks they have been taught from are incorrect". South Korean politician Tae Yong-Ho has said: "History has proven that loudspeaker broadcasting to North Korea is the quickest and most effective way to peacefully manage the situation along the border and deter war".

== History ==
=== 1963–2004 ===
The first use of loudspeakers in Korea after the Korean War was by the administration of South Korea's Park Chung-hee in 1963. South Korea's broadcasts ended in 2004 during negotiations between the two countries. South Korea threatened to resume the broadcasts in 2010, but settled for broadcasting radio into North Korea instead.

=== 2015–2018 ===
On 10 August 2015, South Korea began using loudspeakers again, in response to the sinking of the ROKS Cheonan in 2010 and an incident earlier in August in which two South Korean soldiers were injured by a North Korean landmine on the DMZ. In response to the broadcasts, North Korea fired artillery rounds across the border at the loudspeakers, and South Korea returned fire. The exchange resulted in no casualties. South Korea's broadcasts were further motivated by North Korea's nuclear test in 2016.

In 2016, South Korea purchased 40 to 60 speaker systems for the purpose of having sound reach the North Korean city of Kaesong, 10 kilometers away. Later that year, however, audits revealed that the speakers were actually too quiet to always reach Kaesong, only going as far as 5 to 7 kilometers north; the three tests done of the new systems in 2016 were conducted at night and in the morning, when sound travels farther than in the day. (Note: Britannica writes: "At night or during periods of dense cloud cover, a temperature inversion occurs; the temperature of the air increases with elevation, and sound waves are refracted back down to the ground. Temperature inversion is the reason why sounds can be heard much more clearly over longer distances at night than during the day—an effect often incorrectly attributed to the psychological result of nighttime quiet.") Still, South Korean officials reported in 2017 that two North Korean soldiers had defected across the border due to the broadcasts. The South again stopped using loudspeakers on 27 April 2018, during negotiations with North Korea over the reduction of "hostile tactics" along the DMZ. This was in exchange for the North expressing regret over the 2015 landmine incident. South Korea then dismantled their speakers.

=== 2024–2025 ===
In January 2024, North Korean leader Kim Jong-un said he would end North Korea's ambition of peaceful reunification with South Korea. In summer 2024, North Korea sent at least 2,000 balloons filled with trash and manure across the DMZ. South Korea warned that if North Korea continued sending the balloons, they would resume loudspeaker broadcasts; North Korea continued sending them.

Following a national security meeting over the balloons, South Korea withdrew from the 2018 agreement limiting DMZ activities, and on 9 June, resumed the use of loudspeakers at one location. Kim Yo Jong, Kim Jong-un's sister, warned hours later that North Korea would escalate into using an unspecified "new response" and enter a "crisis of confrontation" if South Korea continued to use the loudspeakers (as well as failing to stop South Korean civilians from airdropping anti-North Korean leaflets in North Korea). South Korean defense minister Shin Won-sik said his country was prepared for military retaliation by North Korea. A day later, South Korea said that North Korea was installing more speakers along its side of the border.

In July 2024, South Korea decided to increase the scope of broadcasting to be all along the DMZ. In September, the Incheon city government in South Korea announced it would be compensating 8,800 of its residents near the border who had experienced distress because of North Korea's loudspeakers.

After the election of Lee Jae Myung as President in 2025, South Korea started to recalibrate its North Korea policy. In June, South Korea halted the loudspeakers. In August, it started to remove the loudspeakers from the border.
