= North Korea Sanctions Enforcement Act of 2013 =

- Long title: To improve the enforcement of sanctions against the Government of North Korea, and for other purposes.
- Announced in: the 113th United States Congress
- Sponsored by: Rep. Edward R. Royce (R, CA-39)
- Number of co-sponsors: 7

Codification
- Acts affected: International Emergency Economic Powers Act, North Korean Human Rights Act of 2004, Investment Company Act of 1940, North Korean Human Rights Act of 2004, Foreign Assistance Act of 1961, and others.
- U.S.C. sections affected: 31 U.S.C. § 5312, 50 U.S.C. § 1701 et seq., 18 U.S.C. § 981, 18 U.S.C. § 1956, 31 U.S.C. § 5318A, and others.
- Agencies affected: U.S. Securities and Exchange Commission, Central Intelligence Agency, United States Congress, United States Department of State, United States Department of the Treasury, United States Department of Justice, General Services Administration, United States Department of Defense, Department of Homeland Security, Executive Office of the President, Federal Reserve Board of Governors

Legislative history
- Introduced in the House as H.R. 1771 by Rep. Edward R. Royce (R, CA-39) on April 26, 2013; Committee consideration by United States House Committee on Foreign Affairs, United States House Committee on Ways and Means, United States House Committee on the Judiciary, United States House Committee on Financial Services, United States House Committee on Oversight and Government Reform, United States House Ways and Means Subcommittee on Trade, United States House Judiciary Subcommittee on Crime, Terrorism, Homeland Security and Investigations; Passed the House on July 28, 2014 (voice vote)

The North Korea Sanctions Enforcement Act of 2013 (H.R. 1771) was a bill that increased the sanctions against North Korea for pursuing nuclear proliferation.

The bill was passed by the United States House of Representatives during the 113th United States Congress, but never passed the Senate.

== Background ==
North Korea–United States relations developed primarily during the Korean War, but in recent years have been largely defined by North Korea's three tests of nuclear weapons, its development of long-range missiles capable of striking targets thousands of miles away, and its ongoing threats to strike the United States and South Korea with nuclear weapons and conventional forces.

The 2013 Korean crisis, also referred to as the North Korean crisis by media, was an escalation of tensions between North Korea and South Korea, the United States, and Japan that began because of United Nations Security Council Resolution 2087, which condemned North Korea for the launch of Kwangmyŏngsŏng-3 Unit 2. The crisis was marked by extreme escalation of rhetoric by the new North Korean administration under Kim Jong-un and actions suggesting imminent nuclear attacks against South Korea, Japan, and the United States.

According to a recent Gallup poll, North Korea is the most disliked nation in the United States, with only about 11% of Americans viewing North Koreans favorably.

== Provisions of the bill ==
This summary is based largely on the summary provided by the Congressional Research Service, a public domain source.

The North Korea Sanctions Enforcement Act of 2013 would direct the President to investigate credible information of sanctionable activities involving North Korea and to designate and apply sanctions with respect to any person (referred to as a "designated person" and includes business entities, nongovernmental organizations, and governmental entities operating as business enterprises) the President determines is knowingly:

- contributing, through the export to or import from North Korea of any goods or technology, to the use, development, production, stockpiling, or acquisition of nuclear, radiological, chemical, or biological weapons, or any device or system designed to deliver such weapons;
- exporting, or facilitating the export of, defense articles and services to North Korea, or from North Korea to any other country;
- exporting, or facilitating the export of, any luxury goods to North Korea;
- providing, selling, leasing, registering, or reflagging a vessel, aircraft, or other conveyance, or providing insurance or any other shipping or transportation service used to transport goods to or from North Korea, for purposes of facilitating a specified unlawful activity or evading a regulation established under this Act or the International Emergency Economic Powers Act (IEEPA);
- transferring, paying, exporting, withdrawing, or otherwise dealing with any property or interest in property of the government of North Korea for purposes of facilitating such unlawful activity or evading such regulations;
- engaging in or facilitating censorship by North Korea; or
- committing or facilitating a serious human rights abuse by North Korea.

The bill would direct the President to designate and exercise IEEPA authorities with respect to the government of North Korea as well as any person or foreign government the President determines has been:

- listed or sanctioned under any regulation, specified executive order, or the IEEPA for illicit activities or activities concerning North Korea's :*proliferation of weapons of mass destruction;
- sanctioned under U.N. Security Council resolutions concerning North Korea's proliferation of weapons of mass destruction; or
- convicted of a criminal offense for engaging in sanctionable activities.

The bill would authorize the President to exercise IEEPA authorities with respect to any foreign government or financial institution the President determines to be:

- engaging in sanctionable activities involving North Korea;
- failing to freeze funds, assets, or economic resources of a person designated pursuant to the requirements above or that could be used to facilitate sanctionable activities relating to imports or exports;
- failing to monitor import and export transactions appropriately;
- permitting any North Korean financial institution to open any new branches, offices, or joint ventures within its jurisdiction, or to take an ownership interest in, or establish or maintain a correspondent relationship with any bank in its jurisdiction, if it could be used to facilitate sanctionable import or export activities;
- failing to prohibit transfers of bulk cash to and from North Korea in facilitation of sanctionable import or export activities;
- providing public financial support for trade with North Korea to facilitate such import or export activities; or
- facilitating the use of any proceeds of the bribery of North Korean government officials, or the misappropriation, theft, or embezzlement of public funds by, or for the benefit of, such officials.

The bill would set forth civil and criminal penalties under the IEEPA.

The bill would establish the North Korea Enforcement and Humanitarian Fund in which assets subject to criminal, civil, or administrative forfeiture or penalties are to be deposited for the enforcement of this Act and to carry out humanitarian activities under the North Korean Human Rights Act of 2004.

The bill would express the sense of Congress that the government of North Korea should be treated as a primary money laundering concern that may be required to undertake special measures with respect to the recordkeeping and reporting of certain financial transactions as well as the identification of customers or retention of information relating to certain beneficial ownership, payable-through, or correspondent accounts. Directs the Secretary of the Treasury to require domestic financial institutions to apply special measures to certain designated entities.

The bill would direct domestic financial institutions to terminate various accounts maintained for persons, foreign governments, or financial institutions required to be designated as engaging in sanctionable activity under this Act and for foreign financial institutions providing services to such designated entities.

The bill would prohibit a designated person that is a domestic financial institution from serving as a primary dealer in U.S. debt instruments or as a repository for U.S. funds.

The bill would set forth authority for the President to prohibit certain foreign exchange and banking transactions, revoke transaction licenses, and direct the United States Secretary of State to deny visas to designated aliens.

The bill would permit the President to impose sanctions against persons providing specialized financial messaging services to designated North Korean financial institutions.

The bill would require a validated license for exports to North Korea under the Export Administration Act of 1979. Prohibits munitions and defense articles from being provided to North Korea under the Arms Export Control Act regardless of whether it is designated as a state sponsor of terrorism.

The bill would bar U.S. government contracts from being provided to designated persons.

The bill would authorize the seizure or forfeiture of vessels or aircraft used to facilitate sanctionable activities.

The bill would direct the President to withhold assistance to the governments of countries providing defense articles or services to North Korea or receiving such articles or services from North Korea.

The bill would set forth exceptions to designations under this Act and authorizes the President to waive designations and sanctions, for a period of up to one year, upon the President's submission to Congress of a determination that the waiver:

- protects vital U.S. economic and national security interests,
- benefits entities cooperating with investigations, and
- addresses humanitarian aid considerations while meeting other specified standards. Permits the President to temporarily suspend sanctions with a certification to Congress under specified circumstances and to prescribe rules for removing sanctions.

The bill would direct issuers of financial securities regulated by the Securities and Exchange Commission (SEC) to disclose activities relating to North Korea in annual and quarterly reports.

The bill would authorize state and local governments to divest assets and prohibit investments in companies that invest in North Korea.

The bill would exempt North Korea from the jurisdictional immunity of foreign states, thereby enabling plaintiffs to seek certain damages against North Korea regardless of whether it is designated as a state sponsor of terrorism.

== Congressional Budget Office report ==
This summary is based largely on the summary provided by the Congressional Budget Office, as ordered reported by the House Committee on Foreign Affairs on May 29, 2014. This is a public domain source.

H.R. 1771 would expand existing sanctions against North Korea. The Congressional Budget Office (CBO) estimates that implementing the bill would cost $10 million over the 2015-2019 period, assuming appropriation of the estimated amounts. Pay-as-you-go procedures apply to this legislation because it would affect direct spending and revenues; however, CBO estimates that those effects would not be significant.

Provisions of H.R. 1771 would increase administrative costs of the United States Department of State and the United States Department of the Treasury. Based on information from the Administration, CBO estimates that the departments would hire 10 additional employees to implement the bill and would require additional appropriations averaging $2 million a year over the 2015-2019 period.

== Procedural history ==
The North Korea Sanctions Enforcement Act of 2013 was introduced into the United States House of Representatives on April 26, 2013, by Rep. Edward R. Royce (R, CA-39). The bill was referred to the United States House Committee on Foreign Affairs, the United States House Committee on Ways and Means, the United States House Committee on the Judiciary, the United States House Committee on Financial Services, the United States House Committee on Oversight and Government Reform, the United States House Ways and Means Subcommittee on Trade, and the United States House Judiciary Subcommittee on Crime, Terrorism, Homeland Security and Investigations. On July 28, 2014, the bill was reported (amended) alongside House Report 113-560 part 1. The House voted on July 28, 2014, to pass the bill in a voice vote.

== Debate and discussion ==
Rep. Ed Royce, who introduced the bill, said that "by shutting down North Korea's illicit activities, we deprive the Kim regime of the money he needs to pay his generals and to conduct nuclear weapons research." Royce also argued that "North Korea is undoubtedly one of the most significant security threats that we here face and our allies face."

Rep. Gerry Connolly (D-VA) also supported the bill, arguing that "the U.S. will not and cannot allow an authoritarian regime to operate with impunity and threaten our national security and that of our allies."

The North Korea Freedom Coalition supported the bill, encouraging Americans to contact their Members of Congress about the bill. According to the organization, the bill "would impose tough, targeted financial sanctions on North Korean leaders who are responsible for crimes against humanity and would significantly decrease North Korea's profoundly egregious human rights abuses."

An editorial in The Boston Globe called for the passage of the bill as a way for the United States to unilaterally "step up the pressure on this irresponsible regime."

== See also ==
- List of bills in the 113th United States Congress
- Economic sanctions
- International sanctions
- Chemical weapon proliferation
- Nuclear proliferation
