= North Korea Intellectuals Solidarity =

South Korean organization

North Korea Intellectuals Solidarity is a group of North Korean dissidents resident in South Korea.

It was founded by Kim Heung Kwang in October 2008.

== Overview ==
NKIS's mission is to promote freedom, democratization, reform, and human rights for North Korea. Its activities include:

- Conducting academic research on North Korea and unification
- Researching ideas on the development and progression of North Korea
- Cultivating the skills of North Korean defector intellectuals and fostering younger generations

The organization has also been known to smuggle in USB drives containing political information about South Korean governmental activities along with DVDs and other South Korean media content.

== See also ==
- Fighters for a Free North Korea
- North Korean People's Liberation Front
- Rimjin-Gang
