= John Feffer =

American foreign policy writer (born 1963)

- Born: 1963 (age 62–63)
- Education: Haverford College
- Website: http://www.johnfeffer.com/

John Feffer (born 1963) is an author and currently director of Foreign Policy in Focus at the Institute for Policy Studies. He is a fellow at the Open Society Foundations. His books include Crusade 2.0 (City Lights, 2012), a description of contemporary attacks on Islam; North Korea/South Korea: US Policy and the Korean Peninsula, a description of current US policy towards Korea and its limitations; Power Trip, a narrative of American unilateralism during the George W. Bush administration; and Living in Hope, a description of creative responses by local communities to the challenges of globalization. His latest book, Pandemic Pivot (Seven Stories Press, 2020), reflects on the impact of the COVID-19 pandemic and the potential for transformative change coming out of the pandemic.

Feffer is a contributor to The Huffington Post. He has written the satirical plays The Pundit and The Politician, performed in 2012 and 2013 respectively at Washington's Capital Fringe Festival.

He is a member of the Democratic Socialists of America.

== Awards and fellowships ==
- Herbert W. Scoville Fellowship (1988)

== Written works ==
- Foamers: A Novel of Suspense (Scribner, 1997)
- All Over the Map (Smashwords, 2012)
- Crusade 2.0 (City Lights Publishers, 2012)
- Splinterlands (Haymarket Books, 2016)
- Aftershock: A Journey into Eastern Europe's Broken Dreams (Zed Books, 2017)
- Frostlands (Haymarket Books, 2018) Splinterlands Book 2
- The Pandemic Pivot: A Report from the Institute for Policy Studies, The Transnational Institute, and Focus on the Global South (Seven Stories Press, 2020)
- Songlands (Haymarket Books, 2021) Splinterlands Book 3
