= The Interview =

2014 film by Seth Rogen and Evan Goldberg

- Theatrical release poster with the original release season. (Note: The Korean text translates as: "The war will begin" (on the missiles and tanks). The Korean text line right beneath the stars' names above the movie title translates to: "Please do not believe these ignorant dishonorable Americans!" while the small text to the left and right of the title translates to the film's title. The fine print at the bottom of the poster reiterates the opening tagline from the top of the poster, translating to: "Awful work by the 'pigs' that created Neighbors and This Is the End".)
- Directed by: Seth Rogen; Evan Goldberg
- Screenplay by: Dan Sterling
- Story by: Seth Rogen; Evan Goldberg; Dan Sterling
- Produced by: Seth Rogen; Evan Goldberg; James Weaver
- Starring: James Franco; Seth Rogen; Lizzy Caplan; Randall Park
- Cinematography: Brandon Trost
- Edited by: Zene Baker; Evan Henke
- Music by: Henry Jackman
- Production companies: Point Grey Pictures; LStar Capital
- Distributed by: Columbia Pictures (Note: Although the film was released through Sony Pictures Releasing, all references to Sony Pictures were removed from the final film and marketing.)
- Release dates: December 11, 2014 (Los Angeles); December 25, 2014 (United States)
- Running time: 112 minutes
- Country: United States
- Languages: English; Korean
- Budget: $44 million
- Box office: $12.3 million

The Interview is a 2014 American political satire action comedy film produced and directed by Seth Rogen and Evan Goldberg in their second directorial work, following This Is the End (2013). The screenplay was written by Dan Sterling, which he based on a story he co-wrote with Rogen and Goldberg. The film stars James Franco and Rogen as journalists who set up an interview with North Korean leader Kim Jong Un, played by Randall Park, only to end up being recruited by the CIA to assassinate him.

Rogen and Goldberg developed the idea for The Interview in the late 2000s, with Kim Jong Il as the original assassination target. Following Kim Jong Il's death and Kim Jong Un's succession as the North Korean leader in 2011, Rogen, Goldberg and Sterling redeveloped the script to focus on Kim Jong Un's character. The Interview was first announced in March 2013 at the beginning of pre-production, with principal photography taking place in Vancouver from October to December 2013. The film was produced by LStar Capital and Rogen and Goldberg's Point Grey Pictures, and distributed by Columbia Pictures through Sony Pictures Releasing.

In June 2014, the North Korean government threatened action against the United States if Sony released the film. This prompted Sony to delay the film's theatrical release from October 10 to December 25 and reportedly re-edit the film to make it more acceptable to North Korea. In November of that year, Sony's computer systems were hacked by the "Guardians of Peace", a cybercrime group allegedly connected to the North Korean government that also threatened terrorist attacks against theaters showing the film. This led to major theater chains opting not to screen the film and Sony instead releasing it for online digital rental and purchase on December 24, 2014, followed by a limited theatrical release at selected theaters the following day.

The Interview grossed $40 million in digital rentals, making it Sony's most successful digital release, and earned an additional $12.3 million worldwide in box office ticket sales on a $44 million budget. It received mixed reviews from critics for its humor and subject matter, although the performances of Franco, Park and Diana Bang were praised.

== Plot ==
Dave Skylark is the host of the talk show Skylark Tonight, where he interviews celebrities about personal topics. The show's broadcast gets interrupted by news reports about North Korea, regarding its leader Kim Jong Un and concerns about its nuclear weapons.

When Skylark and his crew celebrate producer Aaron Rapaport's 1,000th episode, another producer mockingly criticizes the show for not being a real news program. Upset by this, Rapaport urges change and Skylark agrees before discovering Kim is a fan of their show, prompting Rapaport to arrange an interview. CIA Agent Lacey visits the duo and requests they assassinate Kim with a transdermal strip of ricin via handshake to prevent a possible nuclear launch against the West Coast; they reluctantly agree.

Skylark carries the strip inside a gum pack. Upon their arrival in Pyongyang, the group is greeted by North Korean chief propagandist Sook-yin Park and taken to the palace, where they are introduced to Kim's security officers Koh and Yu, who are immediately suspicious of them. When Koh finds the strip, he mistakes it for gum and chews it. After making a secret request for help, Lacey airdrops them two more strips via a drone. To get it back to their room however, Rapaport is forced to evade a Siberian tiger and hide the container in his rectum, before getting caught and stripped naked by security.

Skylark meets and befriends Kim, who convinces Skylark that he is misunderstood as a cruel dictator and a failed administrator, and spends the day playing basketball, hanging out, riding in his personal tank and partying with escorts together. At a state dinner, Koh suffers a seizure and diarrhea from the ricin poisoning, accidentally shooting Yu before dying. A guilt-ridden Skylark discards one of the ricin strips the next morning and thwarts Rapaport's attempt to poison Kim with the second strip.

At a dinner mourning the deaths of the bodyguards, Skylark witnesses Kim's malicious self as he angrily threatens South Korean "capitalists", the United States and everyone who attempts to undermine his power, and later discovers Kim has been lying to him upon seeing that a nearby grocery store is fake. At the same time, while seducing Rapaport, Sook reveals she despises Kim and apologizes for defending his regime. Skylark returns and tries to get Sook's support to assassinate Kim, but she suggests they instead damage his cult of personality and show the North Korean people the dire state of the country. The trio devises a plan to expose Kim on-air, arming themselves with guns.

In the internationally televised interview with Kim, Skylark addresses increasingly sensitive topics, including the food shortage and American-imposed economic sanctions, then challenges his need for his father's approval. Rapaport and Sook takes over the control room to fight off the guards trying to cut the broadcast, with Sook killing Kim's high-ranking general. Initially resistant and rebuffed by Skylark's claims, Kim cries and defecates himself after Skylark, having known his fondness for Katy Perry, ruins his reputation by singing "Firework". Enraged at Skylark's betrayal, Kim shoots him and vows revenge by preparing the nuclear launch. Skylark, who survived due to wearing a bulletproof vest, escapes with Rapaport and Sook and hijacks Kim's tank to get to their pickup point. In a helicopter, Kim attempts to issue the command to launch the missiles, only to get shot down by Skylark before he could do so.

With the nuclear threat thwarted, Sook guides Skylark and Rapaport to an escape route, saying she has to return to Pyongyang to maintain security. Skylark and Rapaport are later tracked down and rescued by SEAL Team Six disguised as North Korean soldiers. Returning home, Skylark writes a tell-all book about his adventures, Rapaport returns to work as producer and maintains contact with Sook via Skype, and North Korea becomes a denuclearized democracy under Sook's interim leadership.

== Cast ==
- James Franco as Dave Skylark
- Seth Rogen as Aaron Rapaport
- Lizzy Caplan as Agent Lacey
- Randall Park as Kim Jong Un (credited as "President Kim")
- Diana Bang as Sook-yin Park
- Timothy Simons as Malcolm
- Reese Alexander as Agent Botwin
- Anders Holm as Jake
- Charles Rahi Chun as General Jong
- Ben Schwartz as Darryl
- Zochhia as Florida

The film also features cameo appearances from Eminem, Rob Lowe, Bill Maher, Seth Meyers, Joseph Gordon-Levitt, Song Kang-ho, Brian Williams and Scott Pelley. Iggy Azalea, Nicki Minaj, Emma Stone, Zac Efron and Guy Fieri appear in the title card for Skylark Tonight. Robbie, a Siberian tiger from the former Bowmanville Zoo, portrays the tiger who attacks Rapaport in the film.

== Production ==
=== Development ===
Seth Rogen and Evan Goldberg developed the idea for The Interview in the late 2000s, joking about what would happen if a journalist was required to assassinate a world leader. Screenwriter Dan Sterling's screenplay for the film initially revolved around a fictional dictator from a fictional country reminiscent of The Dictator, but Rogen, Goldberg and Sony Pictures executives asked him to focus the script on Kim. The film's working title was Kill Kim Jong Un. Originally, Kim Jong Il was the assassination target in the film, but the project was put on hold when he died in 2011 and was succeeded by his son Kim Jong Un. Development resumed when Rogen and Goldberg realized that Kim Jong Un was closer to their own age, which they felt was more humorous. To write the story, Rogen, Goldberg and Sterling researched meticulously by reading non-fiction books and watching video footage of North Korea. The script was later reviewed by an employee in the State Department. Rogen and Goldberg aimed to make the project more relevant and satirical than their previous films, while still retaining toilet humor. The two were pleased when former NBA star Dennis Rodman visited North Korea and met Kim, as it reinforced their belief that the premise of the film was realistic.

In March 2013, it was announced that Rogen and Goldberg would direct a comedy film for Columbia Pictures in which Rogen would star alongside James Franco, with Franco playing a talk show host and Rogen playing his producer. Rogen and Goldberg were on board to produce along with James Weaver through Point Grey Pictures, while Columbia was said to finance the $30 million budgeted film. In October 2013, Lizzy Caplan signed on to play Agent Lacey, a CIA agent who recruits Franco and Rogen's characters to assassinate Kim. Randall Park and Timothy Simons signed on to co-star later that month. Park and Simons starred as Kim Jong Un and the director of Skylark Tonight, respectively. Park was the first to audition for the role of Kim and got the part immediately. Before filming began, Park gained 15 pounds and cut his hair to make it resemble Kim's signature crew cut. His role was praised by critics. Although Rogen and Goldberg wrote the character of Kim as "robotic and strict", Park instead played it "sheepish and shy", which they found more humorous. Diana Bang was cast as Sook-yin Park, for which she was well received by critics.

=== Filming ===
Principal photography on the film began in Vancouver, British Columbia, on October 10, 2013, and concluded on December 20, 2013. There are hundreds of visual effects in the film; for instance, a crowd scene at the Pyongyang airport was digitally manipulated with a shot from 22 Jump Street.

=== Pre-release reaction ===
In June 2014, The Guardian reported that the film had "touched a nerve" within the North Korean government, as they are "notoriously paranoid about perceived threats to their safety." The Korean Central News Agency (KCNA), the state news agency of North Korea, reported that their government promised "stern" and "merciless" retaliation if the film was released. KCNA said that the release of a film portraying the assassination of the North Korean leader would not be allowed and it would be considered the "most blatant act of terrorism and war". The next month, North Korea's United Nations ambassador Ja Song-nam condemned the film, describing its production and distribution as "an act of war" and because of Kim's assassination in the film, "the most undisguised sponsoring of terrorism." The Guardian described Song-nam's comments as "perfect publicity for the movie". Later in July, KCNA wrote to U.S. President Barack Obama, asking to have the film pulled. Obama even privately called then-Sony Pictures CEO Michael Lynton stating that getting the film made was a mistake. Shortly before the planned release of the film on December 25, 2014, screenwriter Dan Sterling told Creative Screenwriting: "I couldn't believe that the most infamous man in the world knew about my script – but most importantly, I would never want something I wrote to lead to some kind of humanitarian disaster. I would be horrified if anyone got hurt over this."

== Release ==
=== Delay and changes ===
In August 2014, Sony delayed The Interview's release date from October 10 to December 25, 2014 and made post-production alterations to the film to modify its portrayal of North Korea, including changing the designs of buttons worn by characters, which were originally modeled after real North Korean military buttons praising the country's leaders, and cutting a portion of Kim Jong Un's death scene. In December 2014, South Korean singer Yoon Mi-rae revealed that the film used her song "Pay Day" without permission, and that she was taking legal action. Yoon Mi-rae and her label Feel Ghood Music reached a settlement with Sony Pictures on May 13, 2015.

=== Sony Pictures hack and threats ===
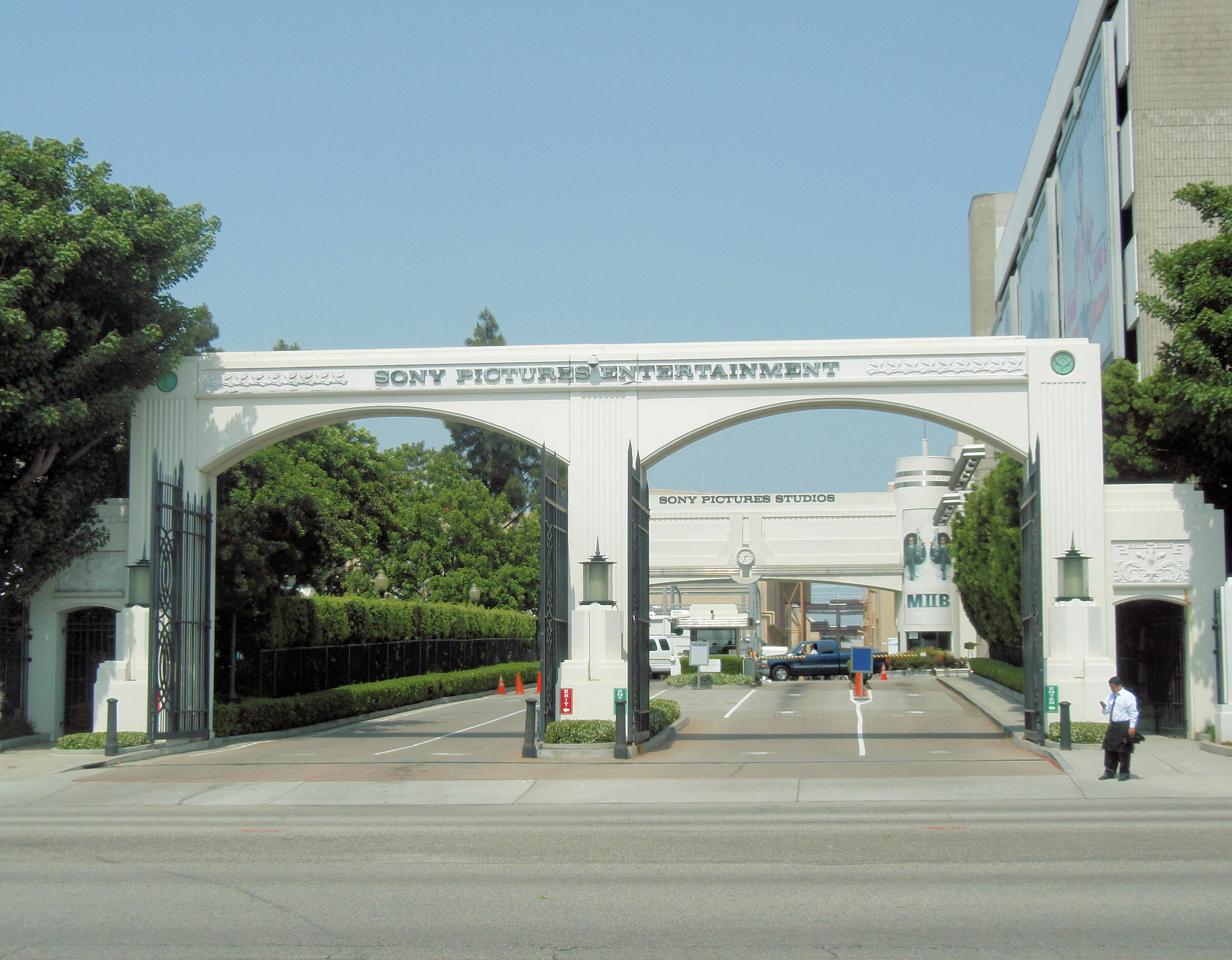
A hacker group compromised much of Sony Pictures Entertainment's computer system in late 2014 in retaliation for the film's content.

On November 24, 2014, an anonymous group identifying themselves as the "Guardians of Peace" hacked the computer networks of Columbia's parent company Sony Pictures Entertainment. The hackers leaked internal emails, employee records and several recent and unreleased Sony Pictures films, including Annie, Mr. Turner, Still Alice and To Write Love on Her Arms. The North Korean government denied involvement in the hack. On December 8, the hackers leaked further materials, including a demand that Sony pull "the movie of terrorism", widely interpreted as referring to The Interview.

On December 16, 2014, the hackers threatened to attack the New York City premiere of The Interview and any theater showing the film. Two further messages were released on December 1; one, sent in a private message to Sony executives, said that the hackers would not release further information if Sony never released the film and removed it from the internet. The other, posted to Pastebin, a web application used for text storage which the Guardians of Peace had used for previous messages, stated that Sony had "suffered enough" and could release The Interview, but only if Kim Jong Un's death scene was not "too happy". The message also threatened that if Sony made another film antagonizing North Korea, the hackers "will be here ready to fight".

=== Distribution ===
The Interview was not released in Russia and Japan, as live-action comedy films do not often perform well in the latter country's market. In the Asia-Pacific region, it was released only in Australia and New Zealand.

Due to the Sony Pictures hack, references to the company and its logos, and the "A Sony Company" byline from the Columbia Pictures logo were all removed from the final film and marketing. Columbia's 1960s logo is featured in the beginning of the film and the print Columbia Pictures logo is used in place of Sony Pictures Home Entertainment's logo on the film's physical media releases, for only Columbia Pictures to be associated with the film.

Rogen predicted that the film would make its way to North Korea, stating that "we were told one of the reasons they're so against the movie is that they're afraid it'll actually get into North Korea. They do have bootlegs and stuff. Maybe the tapes will make their way to North Korea and cause a revolution." Business Insider reported via Free North Korea Radio that there was high demand for bootleg copies of the film in North Korea. The South Korean human rights organizations Fighters for a Free North Korea and Human Rights Foundation, largely made up of North Korean defectors, planned to distribute DVD copies of The Interview via balloon drops. The groups had previously air-dropped offline copies of the Korean Wikipedia into North Korea on a bootable USB memory device. The balloon drop was scrapped after the North Korean government referred to the plan as a de facto "declaration of war".

=== Cancellation of wide theatrical release ===
The film's world premiere was held in Los Angeles on December 11, 2014. The film was scheduled a wide release in the United Kingdom and Ireland on February 6, 2015. Following the hackers' threats on December 16, Rogen and Franco canceled scheduled publicity appearances and Sony pulled all television advertising. The National Association of Theatre Owners said that they would not object to theater owners delaying the film to ensure the safety of filmgoers. Shortly afterward, the ArcLight and Carmike cinema chains announced they would not screen the film.

On December 17, Sony canceled the New York City premiere. Later that day, other major theater chains including AMC, Cinemark, Cineplex, Regal, Southern Theatres and several independent movie theaters either delayed or canceled screenings of the film, leading to Sony announcing they were scrapping the wide theatrical release of the film altogether. The chains reportedly came under pressure from shopping malls where many theaters are located, which feared that the terror threat would ruin their holiday sales. They also feared expensive lawsuits in the event of an attack; Cinemark, for instance, contended that it could not have foreseen the 2012 Aurora, Colorado shooting, which took place at one of its multiplexes, a defense that would not hold in the event of an attack at a screening of The Interview.

Sony Pictures' statement regarding the cancellation of the wide theatrical release

In light of the decision by the majority of our exhibitors not to show the film The Interview, we have decided not to move forward with the planned December 25 theatrical release. We respect and understand our partners' decision and, of course, completely share their paramount interest in the safety of employees and theater-goers. Sony Pictures has been the victim of an unprecedented criminal assault against our employees, our customers, and our business. Those who attacked us stole our intellectual property, private emails, and sensitive and proprietary material, and sought to destroy our spirit and our morale – all apparently to thwart the release of a movie they did not like. We are deeply saddened at this brazen effort to suppress the distribution of a movie, and in the process do damage to our company, our employees, and the American public. We stand by our filmmakers and their right to free expression and are extremely disappointed by this outcome.

The cancellation also affected other films portraying North Korea. An Alamo Drafthouse Cinema location in Dallas planned to hold a free screening of Team America: World Police, which satirizes Kim Jong Un's father Kim Jong Il, in place of its previously scheduled screening of The Interview, but Paramount Pictures refused to permit the screening. 20th Century Fox and New Regency pulled out of a planned film adaptation of the graphic novel Pyongyang starring Steve Carell, who declared it a "sad day for creative expression".

Sony received criticism for canceling the film's wide release. Guardian film critic Peter Bradshaw wrote it was an "unprecedented defeat on American turf", but that "North Korea will find that their bullying edict will haunt them." In the Capital and Gizmodo suggested the cancellation caused a Streisand effect, whereby the attempt to remove or censor a work has the unintended consequence of publicizing it more widely. In a press conference, U.S. President Barack Obama said that though he was sympathetic to Sony's need to protect employees, he thought Sony had "made a mistake. We cannot have a society in which some dictator in some place can start imposing censorship in the United States. I wish they'd spoken to me first. I would have told them: do not get into the pattern in which you are intimidated."

According to Sony Pictures CEO Michael Lynton, the cancellation of the wide release was not a response to the hackers' threats, but to the refusal of cinema chains to screen the film and that Sony would seek other ways to distribute the film. Sony released a statement saying that the company "is and always has been strongly committed to the First Amendment… Free expression should never be suppressed by threats and extortion."

==== Revised release ====
After the wide release cancellation, Sony considered other ways to release the film citing pressure from the film industry, theater owners and the White House. On NBC's Meet the Press on December 21, Sony's legal counsel David Boies confirmed that the company was still committed to releasing the film. Sony planned a limited theatrical release on December 25, 2014, at more than three hundred American independent and arthouse theaters. Lynton stated that Sony was trying to show the film to the largest audience by securing as many theaters as they could.

Sony released The Interview for rental or purchase via the streaming services Google Play, Xbox Video and YouTube on December 24, 2014. It was also available for a limited time on SeeTheInterview.com, a website operated by the stealth startup Kernel.com, which Sony previously worked with to market The Fifth Wave. Within hours, The Interview spread to file sharing websites after a security hole allowed people to download rather than stream the film. TorrentFreak estimated that The Interview had been downloaded illegally via torrents at least 1.5 million times in just two days. On December 27, the North Korean National Defense Commission released a statement accusing President Obama of forcing Sony to distribute the film. The film was released on iTunes on December 28.

In the first week of January 2015, Sony announced The Interview would receive a wide theatrical release in the United Kingdom and Ireland on February 6, but it would not be distributed digitally in the United Kingdom. The film became available for streaming on Netflix on January 24.

=== Home media ===
Sony released the film on Blu-ray Disc and DVD on February 17, 2015. The home release was packaged as the "Freedom Edition", and included 90 minutes of deleted scenes, behind-the-scenes featurettes, a blooper reel, feature commentary with directors Rogen and Goldberg, and a special episode of Naked and Afraid featuring Rogen and Franco. As of July 21, 2015, the film had earned over $6.7 million in sales in the U.S.

== Reception ==
=== Box office and online rentals ===
The Interview opened to a limited release in the United States on December 25, 2014, across 331 theaters and earned over $1 million on its opening day. Variety called the opening gross "an impressive launch for a title playing in only about 300 independent theaters in the U.S." It went on to earn over $1.8 million in its opening weekend, and by the end of its run on January 25, 2015, had grossed $6.1 million at the box office. Within four days of its online release on December 24, 2014, The Interview earned over $15 million through online rentals and purchases. It became Sony Pictures' highest-grossing online release, outselling Arbitrage ($14 million), Bachelorette ($8.2 million) and Snowpiercer ($7 million). It was the top-selling Google Play and YouTube film of 2014. By January 20, 2015, the film had earned more than $40 million from online sales and rentals.

Sony expected The Interview to break even through video-on-demand sales and saving millions of dollars on marketing. The National Association of Theatre Owners contended that Sony would lose at least $30 million due to the film's poor box office performance.

=== Critical response ===
On review aggregation website Rotten Tomatoes, the film holds a 51% approval rating, based on 154 reviews, with an average rating of 5.70/10. The site's consensus reads: "Unfortunately overshadowed by controversy (and under-screened as a result), The Interview's screenplay offers middling laughs bolstered by its two likable leads." On Metacritic, the film has a score of 52 out of 100, based on 33 critics, indicating "mixed or average reviews".

IGN's Roth Cornet wrote that "though it's unlikely to stand out as one of the shrewdest political satires of its time, [it] is a clever, unrestrained and—most importantly—sidesplitting parody that pokes fun at both a vapid media and one of the world's most dangerous dictators". Edward Douglas of ComingSoon.net said the film was "hilarious, but it will probably get us nuked". Jordan Hoffman of The Guardian gave the film three out of five stars, writing that "if this unessential but agreeable movie really triggered an international response, this is life reflecting art in a major way".

Scott Foundas of Variety panned the film for being "cinematic waterboarding" and "about as funny as a communist food shortage, and just as protracted", but praised the performances of Randall Park and Diana Bang. Mike Hale of The New York Times also praised Park and Bang, but wrote that "after seeing The Interview and the ruckus its mere existence has caused, the only sensible reaction is amazement at the huge disconnect between the innocuousness of the film and the viciousness of the response".

=== Political response ===
In the wake of the Sony Pictures hack, leaks revealed e-mails between Sony Pictures CEO Michael Lynton and RAND Corporation defense analyst Bruce Bennett from June 2014. Bennett advised against toning down The Interview's graphic Kim death scene, in the hope that it would "start some real thinking in South Korea and, I believe, in the North once the DVD leaks into the North". Bennett expressed his view that "the only resolution I can see to the North Korean nuclear and other threats is for the North Korean government to eventually go away", which he felt would be likeliest to occur following an assassination of Kim. Lynton replied that a senior figure in the United States Department of State agreed. Bennett responded that the office of Robert R. King, U.S. Special Envoy for North Korean Human Rights Issues, had determined that the North Korean statements had been "typical North Korean bullying, likely without follow-up".

In an interview with CNN, Bennett said Lynton sits on the board of trustees of the RAND Corporation, which had asked Bennett to talk to Lynton and give his opinion on the film. Bennett felt The Interview was "coarse" and "over the top", but that "the depiction of Kim Jong-un was a picture that needed to get into North Korea. There are a lot of people in prison camps in North Korea who need to take advantage of a change of thinking in the north." Bennett felt that if the DVD were smuggled into the country it might have an effect "over time". Bennett contacted the Special Envoy for North Korean Human Rights Issues, a personal friend of his, who "took the standard government approach: we don't tell industry what to do". Jen Psaki, then a spokesperson for the United States Department of State, confirmed that Daniel R. Russel, the U.S. Assistant Secretary of State for East Asian and Pacific Affairs, had spoken to Sony executives; she reiterated that "entertainers are free to make movies of their choosing, and we are not involved in that".

North Korean state press threatened "merciless" retaliation for his depiction in the film. Rogen responded, "People don't usually wanna kill me for one of my movies until after they've paid 12 bucks for it."

== Legacy ==
In Greece in April 2017, the film's opening scene, depicting a young girl reciting a poem with hate speech, was mistakenly broadcast in the news bulletin of Alpha TV and the news program Live News on Epsilon TV, as a real-life provocative event against the United States. In response to the backlash on various online newspapers, Antonis Sroiter and Nikos Evangelatos, the hosts of the said programs, apologized in posts they made on their social accounts. In his 2026 memoir, Lynton regretted getting the film greenlit.

== See also ==
- Assassinations in fiction
- Team America: World Police, another comedy film satirizing North Korea
- The Dictator, a comedy film satirizing Middle Eastern dictators
