= North Korea Freedom Coalition =

American human rights organization

- Formation: 2003
- Headquarters: Fairfax, Virginia, United States
- Region served: International
- Chairwoman: Suzanne Scholte
- Website: Official website

The North Korea Freedom Coalition (NKFC) is a US organisation established in 2003 for human rights and freedom in North Korea. The North Korea Freedom Coalition is composed of 60 organizations. Some of these organizations are advocacy groups, such as women's rights and refugee groups. Other groups have a religious background, and perform missionary work from outside of the North Korean border.

== Advocacy ==
The NKFC supported the North Korea Sanctions Enforcement Act of 2013 (H.R. 1771; 113th Congress), a bill that would increase U.S. sanctions against North Korea. The organization encouraged Americans to contact their Members of Congress about the bill. According to the organization, the bill "would impose tough, targeted financial sanctions on North Korean leaders who are responsible for crimes against humanity and would significantly decrease North Korea's profoundly egregious human rights abuses."
