= Korean Wikipedia =

Korean-language edition of Wikipedia

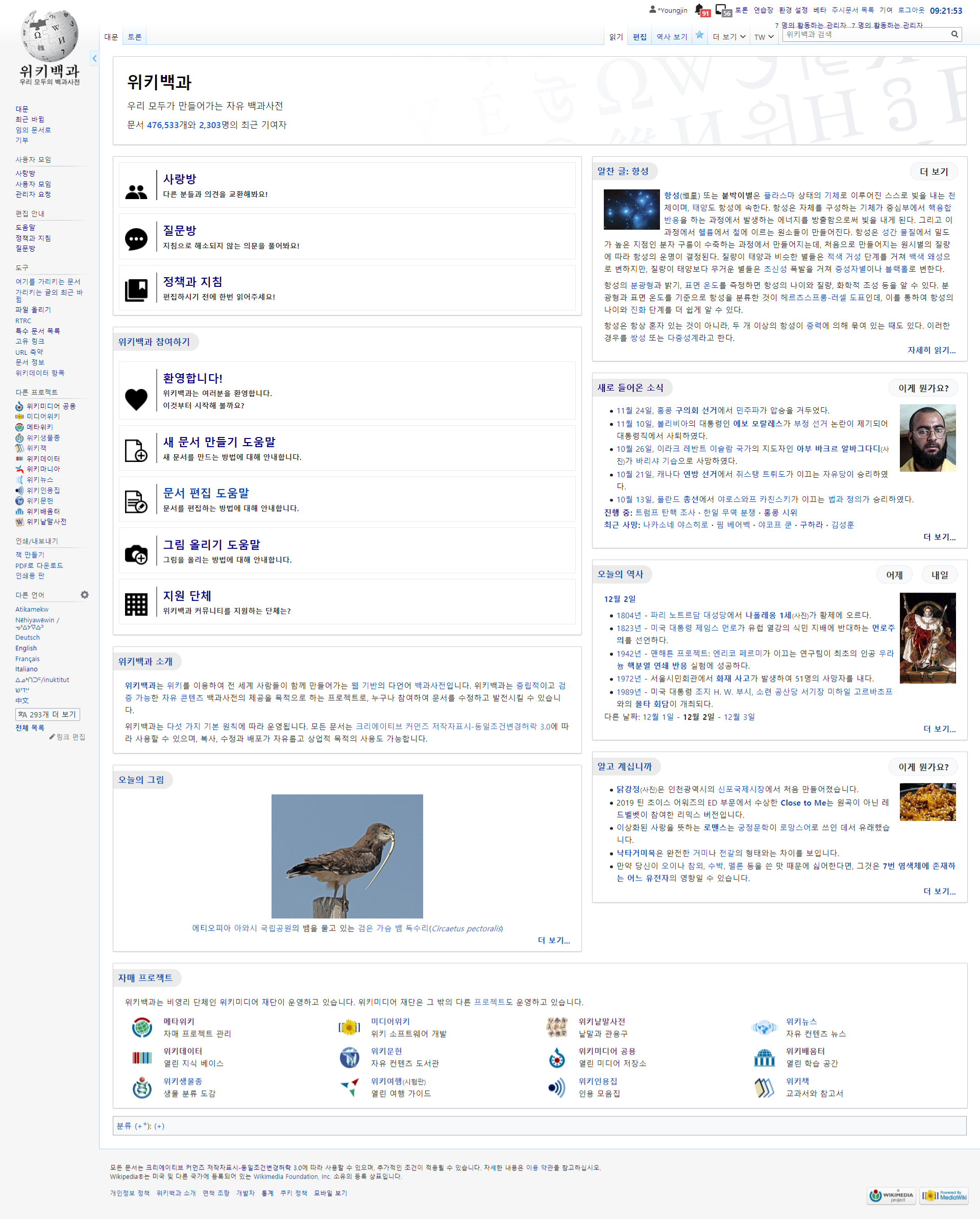
- Screenshot Main Page of the Korean Wikipedia in December 2019
- Website type: Internet encyclopedia project
- Available in: Korean
- Owner: Wikimedia Foundation
- Website: ko.wikipedia.org
- Commercial: No
- Registration: Optional
- Content license: Creative Commons Attribution/ Share-Alike 4.0 (most text also dual-licensed under GFDL); Media licensing varies

Korean name
- Hangul: 한국어 위키백과
- Hanja: 韓國語 위키百科
- RR: Hangugeo Wikibaekgwa
- MR: Han'gugŏ Wik'ibaekkwa

The Korean Wikipedia (Korean: 한국어 위키백과) is the Korean-language edition of Wikipedia. Founded on 11 October 2002, it is the 23rd-largest Wikipedia, with 767,370 articles and 4,949 active users. It is the second-largest Korean-language wiki, following Namuwiki.

== Name ==
The Korean Wikipedia is called Wikibaekgwa (위키백과) instead of Wikipidia (위키피디아). Aside from the Chinese Wikipedia, which adopted a semantic translation due to the difficulty of phonetic transcription, nearly all other editions use "Wikipedia" (or slight variations) as their official name.

== History ==
Korean Wikipedia
Articles	767370
Files	15830
Edits	42538354
Users	1058392
Active users	4949
Admins	23

The Korean Wikipedia initially used an older version of MediaWiki. The software had problems representing Hangul, which limited usage. In August 2002, the software was upgraded and started to support non-English scripts such as Hangul. From October 2002 to July 2003, the number of articles increased from 13 to 159, and in August 2003 it reached 348. In September 2003, the Hangul problem was solved. From September 2003, the number of contributions and visits increased. The Korean Wikipedia's prospects became even more optimistic following the momentum created by substantial coverage in the Korean media. It reached 10,000 articles on 4 June 2005.

On 16 April 2011, discussions were held to promote the formation of a group to support Wikimedia projects in South Korea. Subsequently, on 10 March 2012, the Wikimedia Korea Chapter Preparation Committee was established. A founding general meeting was held on 19 October 2014, and finally, on 4 November 2015, the non-profit corporation Korea Wikimedia Association was officially established and has been active since then. In 2019, it was approved by the Wikimedia Foundation in the United States as a recognized chapter in South Korea.

== Milestones ==
Articles	Date reached
1	12 October 2002
10,000	5 June 2005
20,000	12 February 2006
30,000	14 December 2006
40,000	2 August 2007
50,000	4 January 2008
60,000	24 April 2008
70,000	7 August 2008
80,000	20 November 2008
90,000	25 February 2009
100,000	4 June 2009
150,000	15 December 2010
200,000	19 May 2012
250,000	3 October 2013
300,000	5 January 2015
350,000	3 June 2016
400,000	21 October 2017
500,000	15 June 2020
600,000	16 August 2022
700,000	18 March 2025

== Comparisons to other Korean wikis and information services ==
Korean Wikipedia is the 2nd largest Korean language wiki, and the 33rd most visited website of 2024. According to The Hankyoreh, Namuwiki had 7.2 times more traffic compared to the Korean Wikipedia as of October 2024. It is generally reported that Korean Wikipedia is less substantive and influential compared to Namuwiki.

Wikipedia co-founder Jimmy Wales stated that, in other countries, models like Wikipedia were first introduced during the early stages of the internet, leading to enthusiastic responses. In contrast, South Korea had existing collective collaboration services, such as Naver's question-and-answer site Jisik-in, leading to more lackluster responses.

== Dialects ==
There are two major standards in the Korean language: the South Korea standard, and the North Korea standard. North Koreans are underrepresented on the Korean Wikipedia due to censorship of the internet in North Korea. Therefore, most users of the Korean Wikipedia are South Koreans and most articles are written in the South Korean style. The official name of the Wikipedia is 한국어 위키백과 (Hangugeo Wiki-baekgwa). "Hangugeo" is the name for the Korean language in South Korea, and "baekgwa" is a clipped form of 백과사전 (baekgwasajeon, "encyclopedia").

== Services derived from Korean Wikipedia ==
Businesses heavily make use of the Korean Wikipedia in various ways since its license, the Creative Commons Attribution Share-Alike License (CC BY-SA), allows modification and distribution for commercial purposes. In 2005, the web portal Empas integrated the Korean Wikipedia database in its search tool. The feature to search Korean Wikipedia using a mobile phone with a wireless Internet connection through the web portal Nate was available to the subscribers of SK Telecom from 6 July 2007. Since 21 August, Daum mirrored Korean Wikipedia and English Wikipedia on its portal, and Naver also started to present the search results from the Korean and English Wikipedia prior to others from 11 January 2008.

== Politics ==
The South Korean right-wing youth group Story K favors proactive involvement in contributing to Korean Wikipedia. Human rights groups have sent copies of the Korean Wikipedia to North Korea on USB sticks by balloon.
