= Justin Bitakwira =

Congolese politician (born 1960)

Member of the National Assembly
- Incumbent
- Assumed office 30 July 2006
- Constituency: Uvira

Personal details
- Born: 5 December 1960 (age 65) Lemera, Uvira Territory, South Kivu, Democratic Republic of the Congo
- Party: Union for the Congolese Nation

Justin Bitakwira Bihona-Hayi (born 5 December 1960) is a Congolese politician and a member of the National Assembly. He is the founder of the Alliance pour la République et la Conscience Nationale political party (ARCN) and a member of the Union for the Congolese Nation (Union pour la Nation Congolaise; UNC). He has been affiliated with several political parties, including the Union for Democracy and Social Progress (UDPS) and the People's Party for Reconstruction and Democracy (PPRD). He held various government positions, including Minister of Rural Development, Minister of Communication and Media and Minister of Relations with Parliament. As a minister, his political principles were described as nationalist, populist, opportunist, reformist, tribalist, and protectionist.

== Early life ==
Justin Bitakwira Bihona-Hayi was born on 5 December 1960, to a Fuliiru herder and farmer, Somora Mugambire, in Lemera, Bafuliiru Chiefdom, Uvira Territory, within the South Kivu Province of the Democratic Republic of the Congo. His uncle is the former Mai-Mai guerrilla movement leader, Zabuloni Rubaruba. In 1967, at the age of seven, his father was slaughtered by the Mulelist insurgents who emerged in the Lemera and Uvira areas east and south of Bukavu. He completed his primary studies at EP Katala and earned his Primary School Certificate. He then continued his secondary studies at Stella Maris College (now Institut Mwanga D'Uvira) in Uvira, where he obtained his state diploma in playwriting in 1978. After a brief stint in a small seminary in Mungombe (Mwenga Territory), he pursued community development and management courses in Cameroon.

== Political career ==
In the early 1980s, Bitakwira became involved in politics and became the head of the UDPS in Uvira in 1984. Later, he orchestrated a conference exhorting the Vira and Fuliiru communities to oppose a Ngala official representative of the National Documentation Agency (Agence Nationale de Documentation), a Zairean intelligence service. He was subsequently arrested and imprisoned for 15 days. On 5 August 1987, Bitakwira spearheaded a collective of young aspirants from Uvira in drafting an open epistle addressed to President Mobutu Sese Seko, intending to deliver it to the Zaire Embassy in Bujumbura. At the behest of the Zaire ambassador in Burundi, he was detained within Burundi and subsequently transferred to Uvira, where he endured an ordeal of imprisonment and torment for three months. On 24 December 1987, just before Christmas, he escaped from the Uvira's central penitentiary and fled to Bukavu, where he surrendered to regional authorities.

Following his release from prison, Bitakwira went into exile, first in Kenya and then in Cameroon, where he remained for eight years. He returned to the country in 1998 after the fall of the Mobutu Sese Seko's regime following the First Congo War. On 22 February 1998, he arrived in Kinshasa. He was introduced to Laurent-Désiré Kabila by his former companions from Uvira, who had aligned themselves with the Alliance of Democratic Forces for the Liberation of Congo (AFDL) in April 1998. In 2000, he galvanized a group of over 15,000 youths in front of the Belgian Embassy in Kinshasa to protest against the arrest warrant issued against Abdoulaye Yerodia Ndombasi.

During the first democratic elections in 2006, he ran for legislative elections under the banner of the Congolese Party for Good Governance (Parti Congolais pour la Bonne Gouvernance; PCBG) and was elected national deputy for the Uvira constituency. In 2008, he advocated for the central government to establish state authority throughout the country and deplored the systematic abuses committed against Fuliiru farmers. In the second legislature of 2011, he ran for re-election and was the only one among the 2006 deputies to be re-elected in the same constituency. Later, he left the majority and joined Vital Kamerhe's UNC, where he became the president of the parliamentary group in the National Assembly. In June 2016, he officially launched his political party: Alliance for the Republic and National Conscience (Alliance pour la République et la Conscience Nationale; ARCN), defining it as a party dedicated to revitalizing political, economic, and social life in the Democratic Republic of the Congo.

== Personal sanctions ==
On 8 December 2022, Bitakwira was placed under EU sanctions subjecting him to travel ban and assets freeze in all EU jurisdictions due to his sufficient contributions to the ongoing instability and insecurity in DRC through inflammatory speeches and use of discriminative derogatory language in his public addresses, thus keeping flames of inter-communal conflicts burning.

== See also ==
- Jean Ruhigita Ndagora Bugwika
- Vital Kamerhe
- Emmanuel Ramazani Shadary
