= Yondaru Kimu =

Zainichi Korean historian (1948–2000)

- 김영달
- Born: October 7, 1948; Kasugai, Aichi, Japan
- Died: April 24, 2000 (aged 51); Amagasaki, Hyogo, Japan.
- Citizenship: Japan
- Occupations: Historian; Civil rights activist
- Spouse: Sadae Yamaki

Yondaru Kimu, also known as Kim Young Dal (Korean: 김영달; October 7, 1948 – 2000), was a Korean-Japanese historian who focused on Sōshi-kaimei. He was also a civil rights activist focused on North Koreans fleeing North Korea.

== Early life and education ==
Yondaru Kimu was born on October 7, 1948, in Kasugai, Aichi, Japan. His parents were Korean. In 1970, he gained his Japanese citizenship. He married Sadae Yamaki in 1981. Kimu graduated from Kobe University in 1980.

== Career ==
After graduating college, Kimu was an adjunct professor at Kansai University. He focused on Sōshi-kaimei and modern Korean history.

He was active in various Zainichi groups. He was chair of Rescue the North Korean People-Urgent Action Network (RENK), a civil rights group focused on North Korean human rights.

== Later life and legacy ==
On April 24, 2000, Kimu was stabbed to death in his apartment in Amagasaki, Hyogo, Japan. His colleague Suzanne Scholte and colleagues at RENK speculate Kimu was murdered by North Korea for his human rights work.

Kimu's collection of Zainichi research is in the collection of the University of Southern California's East Asian Library.
