= Lemera Hospital =

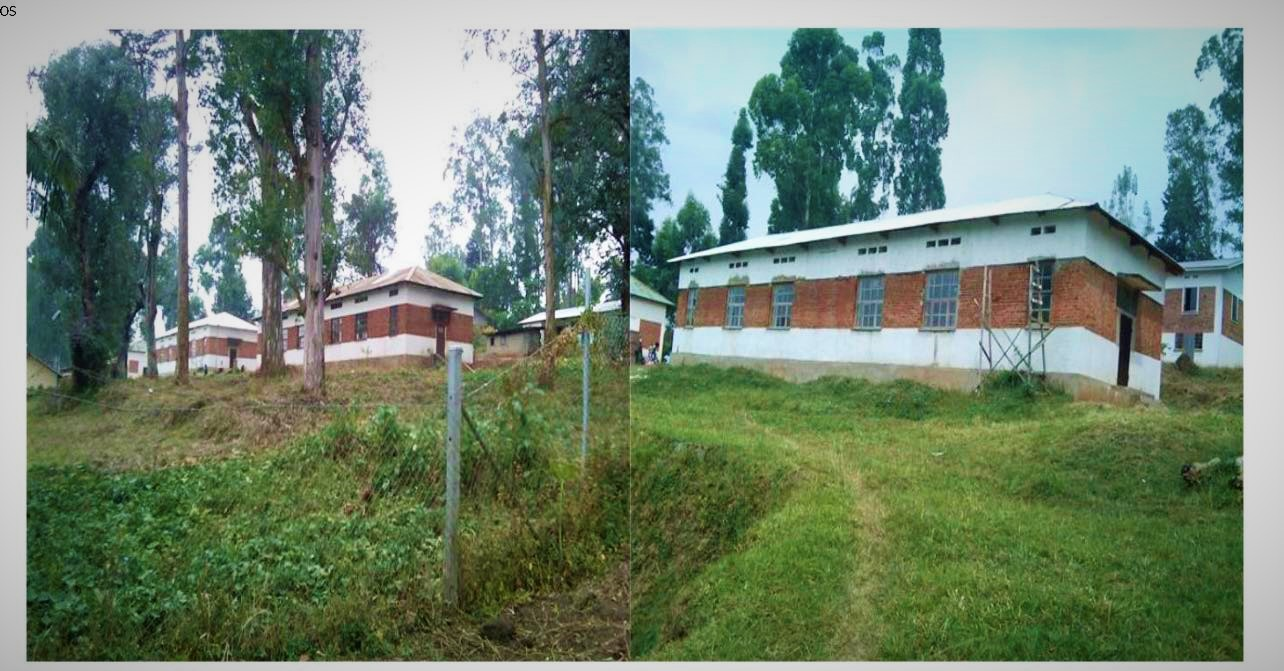
- The Lemera Hospital, Lemera, June 2014

Geography
- Location: Lemera, Bafuliiru Chiefdom, Uvira Territory, South Kivu, Democratic Republic of the Congo

Organisation
- Type: Tertiary
- Religious affiliation: Communauté des Églises de Pentecôte en Afrique Centrale

Services
- Emergency department: Yes

History
- Construction started: 1971; 55 years ago

Links
- Lists: Hospitals in Democratic Republic of the Congo

The Lemera Hospital (French: Hôpital de Lemera), officially Hôpital Général de Référence de Lemera ("Lemera General Reference Hospital"), is the premier general referral hospital in Lemera, the administrative center of the Bafuliiru Chiefdom in Uvira Territory, South Kivu, Democratic Republic of the Congo. It situated 87 kilometers from Uvira, 100 kilometers from Bukavu, and 27 kilometers from the Bukavu-Uvira axis at Bwegera.

Operated under the Department of Medical Works of the Community of Pentecostal Churches in Central Africa (Communauté des Églises de Pentecôte en Afrique Centrale, CEPAC), Lemera Hospital integrates healthcare services with a mission of evangelical outreach. However, the hospital is infamous for the Lemera massacre when the hospital was attacked during the First Congo War by the Alliance of Democratic Forces for the Liberation of Congo (AFDL). It was reconstructed with international aid.

== History ==
Lemera Hospital dates back to 1921 following the arrival of eleven Swedish Pentecostal missionaries from the Swedish Free Mission (Mission Libre Suédoise, MLS) in Kashekebwe (modern-day Uvira) in the Belgian Congo. The pioneering missionary Axel B. Lindgren, accompanied by Norwegian missionaries Gunnerius Tollefsen, his wife, and Hanna Veum, led efforts to identify suitable locations for Norwegian and Swedish Pentecostal missions in the Kivu Province. In 1922, an additional contingent of Swedish missionaries joined the initiative; however, they encountered significant challenges in securing state permission to conduct their missions. Four missionaries died in 1923: one married woman died from childbed fever in May, prompting her husband to return to Sweden, while two additional women succumbed to tropical fever in December. Shortly thereafter, the husband of one of the deceased also passed away. These three missionaries were interred in Uvira, where the group was stationed at that time. Three other missionaries experienced severe illness but ultimately survived. This ordeal led to various theories regarding the fatalities, with some attributing the deaths to alleged poisoning by the local populace, who were initially resistant to the missionaries' gospel, while others suggested that the harsh climate of the Ruzizi Plains was to blame. Remaining in the area were Swedish missionaries Karl Julius Aspenlind and Ruth Aspenlind, along with their children. In 1924, Julius successfully obtained authorization to acquire a hillside area encompassing a few hundred meters in a village situated in the mountains west of Uvira, known as Nia Magira (present-day Lemera), named after Chief Nyamugira Mukogabwe II of the Bafuliiru Chiefdom. The couple became the first European missionaries to establish a presence in Lemera, near a hill where the Chief Mukogabwe resided.

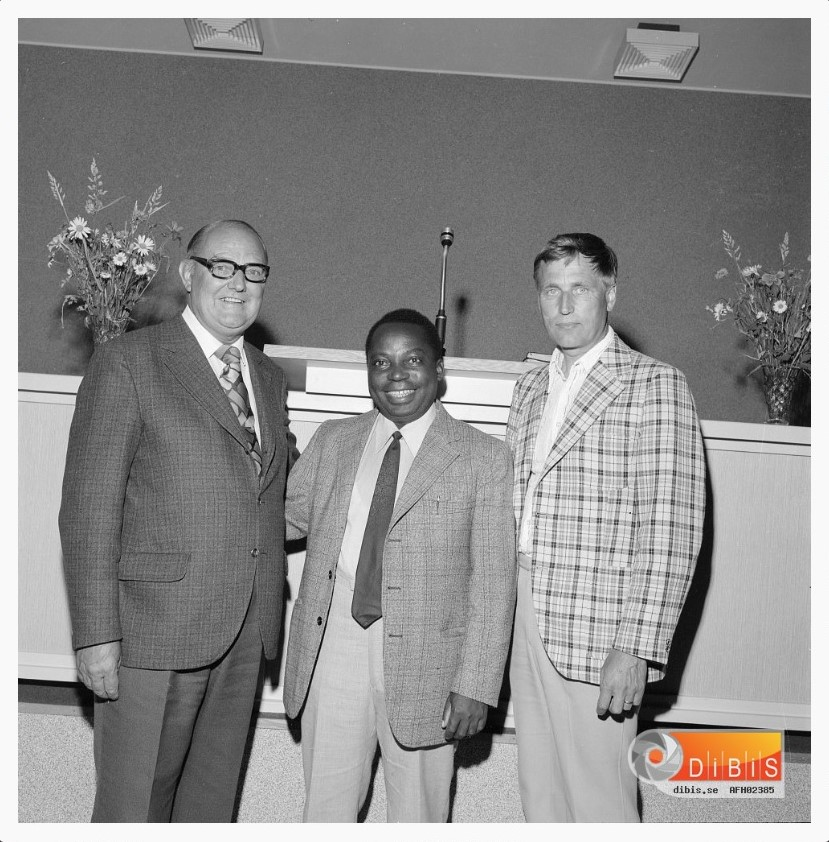
Jean Ruhigita Ndagora Bugwika, founder of the hospital, in Alfta, Sweden, July 1973.

In 1948, Swedish missionaries Goth Petersson and Simon Petersson inaugurated Lemera's first dispensary. Initially, medical care was rudimentary, conducted informally in homes or outdoor settings. Over time, this system evolved, leading to the establishment of a dedicated facility for medical consultations. The dispensary's increasing popularity prompted an expansion of facilities, including the introduction of maternity services initiated by Goth Petersson. By 1965, the maternity wing underwent significant expansion, occupying the former premises of the Protestant Pedagogical Institute of Kivu (Institut Pédagogique Protestant du Kivu, IPPKi), later known as the Bwindi Institute of Bukavu (Institut Bwindi de Bukavu). This growth facilitated the hospital's formal launch in 1971 under the leadership of CEPAC's Legal Representative Jean Ruhigita Ndagora Bugwika. The hospital mainly served Zairean patients afflicted with worm diseases, malaria, typhoid fever, tumors, cardiovascular diseases, and pediatric conditions such as diarrhea and malnutrition. It did not have Congolese physicians during its early years. It was administered by Ingegerd Rooth, who initially worked as a nurse before going back to Sweden to complete her medical training. Upon her return, she became the hospital's physician-in-charge and played a pivotal role in addressing maternal health challenges by performing C-sections to combat high mortality rates caused by obstructed labor and the harmful effects of traditional medicine.

The institution remained without anesthesiology or surgical nursing expertise until early 1975, when Wanja Karlsson was recruited. By that period, only two Congolese trainees had acquired basic training in laboratory diagnostics. In the summer of 1975, Ingegerd Rooth was succeeded by Margareta Halldorf, who had prior experience working in Pinga. Margareta departed in May 1977 and was replaced by Ingegerd once again. Other short-term medical personnel, included doctors such as Bengt Klang and Katrine Danielsson. There were no African doctors on staff during this period, although the hospital employed four African nurses, who were referred to as paramedics, having completed two years of training at a Norwegian hospital in Kaziba Chiefdom, approximately twenty kilometers northwest of Lemera. African medical assistants also supported surgical procedures by assisting surgeons with instruments, compresses, and suture materials, as well as cleaning and sterilizing equipment used during operations.

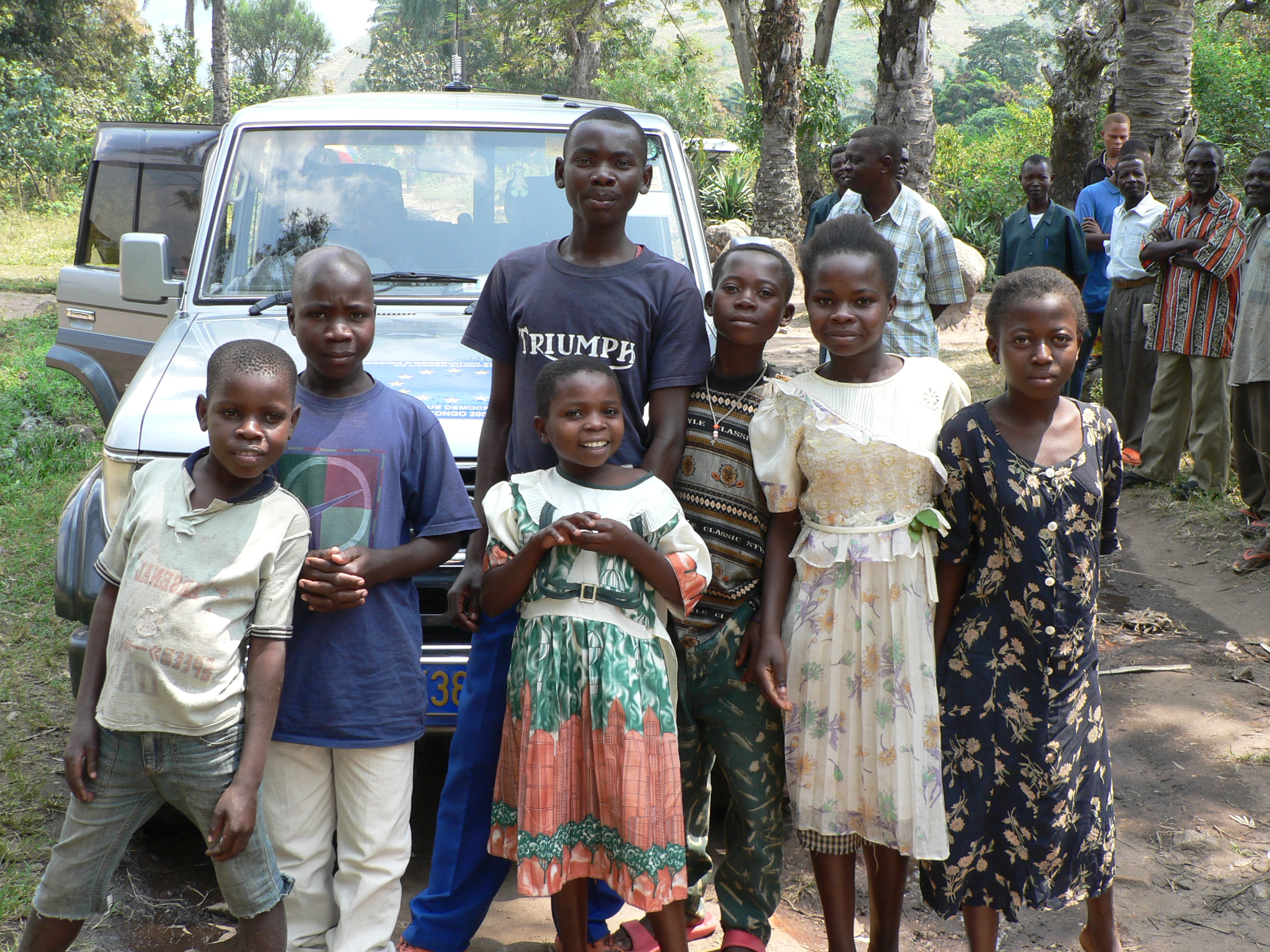
Children of Lemera

The hospital emerged as a central healthcare facility for patients from remote villages within Uvira Territory. Women often traveled long distances, sometimes requiring overnight stays on their journey home. The number of births at the facility increased annually, and the hospital relied on a mission vehicle to transport patients to Uvira Territory for complex procedures. In 1978, Finnish missionary surgeon Veikko Reinikainen joined the hospital and collaborated with two African doctors, including Denis Mukwege, who obtained his medical degree in Bujumbura in June 1983 before beginning his medical practice at Lemera. In 1988, pediatrician Anna Aronsson was appointed as chief physician. Lemera Hospital also witnessed the emergence of Congolese medical practitioners, including Alfayo, Epiki, Runyambo, Musafiri, and Ndombe.

In 1981, Jean Bugwika secured funding from the Swedish International Development Agency (SIDA) to construct additional facilities, including halls and a hydroelectric dam for electricity and water to the hospital and the broader Lemera's populace. In 1988, François Rubota Masumbuko became the managing director. Denis Mukwege, who had been working at the hospital since 1978, focused on gynecology and obstetrics, eventually becoming the medical director in 1992. He held this post until the hospital fell victim to the Lemera massacre in 1996. Dr. Nash Mwanza Nangunia also served the institution from 1994 to 1996. Following the attack, the hospital persisted with the aid of international support, and in 2003, Alexis Kashobo Nagoyola became the medical director. After several years, Denis Ndeni Makenzi succeeded him.

=== First Congo War and Lemera massacre ===
During the onset of the First Congo War, the Lemera Hospital was a prominent medical center and the largest medical facility in South Kivu, providing medical care to approximately 300 patients with 230 beds. It catered to wounded Zairean soldiers caught in the crossfire of armed conflicts, local civilians, and Hutu refugees who were fleeing from Burundi and Rwanda.

On 6 October 1996, the hospital was attacked by members of the Banyamulenge-led armed group. The insurgents pillaged the medical supplies and killed numerous patients, including Zairean soldiers, Hutu refugees, and Zairean civilians. The nurses were killed in their quarters. According to eyewitnesses and the UN Mapping Report, around 37 people were murdered in their beds, either by "bullets or bayonets".

== Organization ==
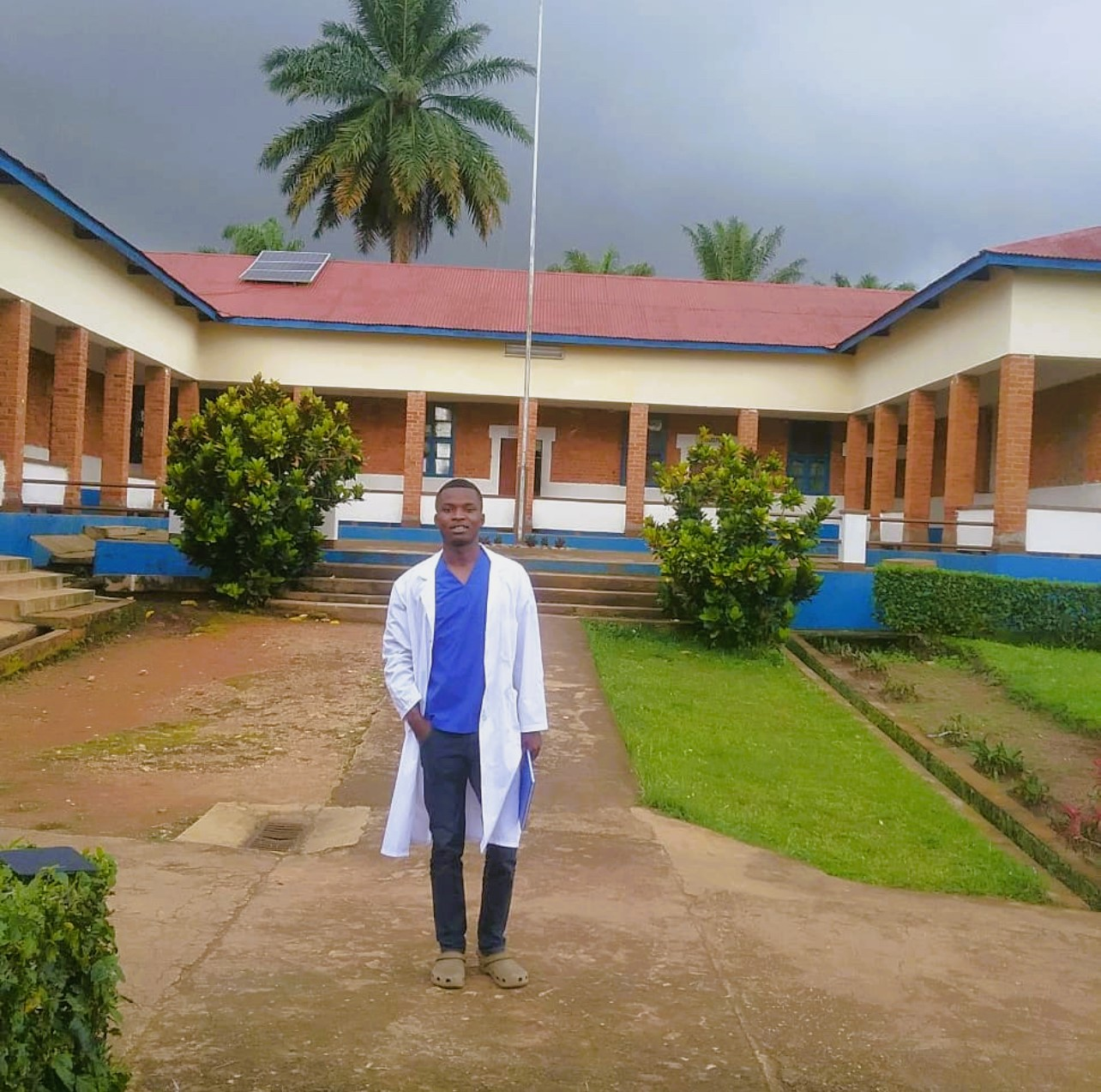
A nurse at Lemera Hospital, April 2020

The Lemera Hospital is organized under the supervision of its management committee, which operates in accordance with the guidelines established by the Department of Medical Works of the Community of Pentecostal Churches in Central Africa (Communauté des Églises de Pentecôte en Afrique Centrale, CEPAC). The committee includes the medical director, managing administrator, chief doctor, missionary representative, church representative, nursing director, union delegate, and accountant.

The services organized within the hospital are:

- Administrative and financial Services
  - General services, which are:
    - Administrative services:
      - Financial services:
        - Accounting :
      - Internal services including:
    - Gynecology – Obstetrics (Maternity);
    - Pediatrics;
    - Surgery (post-operative);
    - Internal Medicine Women and Men.
      - External services:
        - Triage (Nursing consultation);
        - Doctor consultation.
          - Specialized services:
            - Operating room;
            - Laboratory;
            - Ultrasound;
            - Pharmacy;
            - Radiography and Imaging;
            - Therapeutic Nutrition Center;
            - Nutritional Supplementation Center.

== See also ==
- Lemera massacre
