= Lemera massacre =

1996 massacre in Lemara, Democratic Republic of the Congo

- Part of the First Congo War
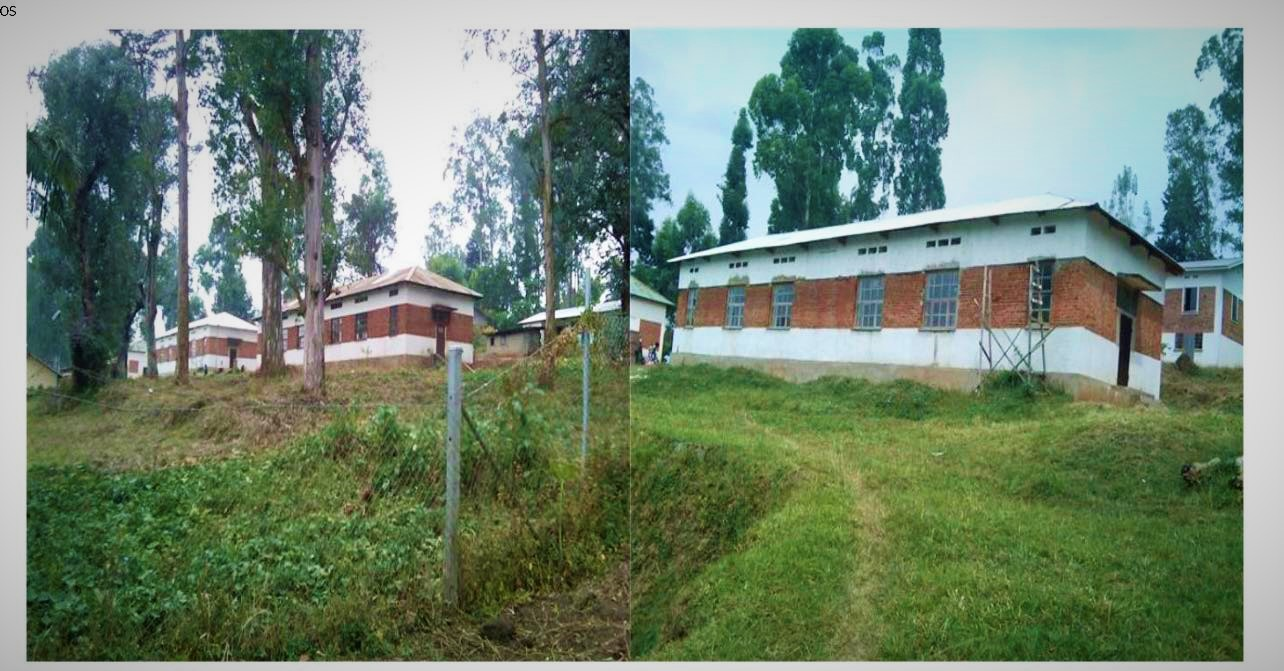
- The Lemera Hospital, where the massacre took place
- Location: Lemera, Uvira Territory, South Kivu, Democratic Republic of the Congo
- Date: 6 October 1996
- Attack type: Massacre, ethnic cleansing, arson
- Deaths: 37 Per UN Mapping Report
- Victims: Fuliru people, FAZ soldiers and medical staffs
- Perpetrator: Alliance of Democratic Forces for the Liberation of Congo (AFDL)

The Lemera massacre (French: Massacre de Lemera), also known as the Lemera Attack (French: Attaque de Lemera) or Lemera Battle (French: Bataille de Lemera) occurred on 6 October 1996, perpetrated by the Alliance of Democratic Forces for the Liberation of Congo (AFDL) at Lemera Hospital, a medical facility in the small town of Lemera in the South Kivu Province of the Democratic Republic of the Congo (DRC). 37 individuals were killed, according to the United Nations Mapping Report.

The attack is often recognized as "the first major crime" of the First Congo War. The massacre left the hospital in ruins and caused widespread shock and outrage in the local and international community. On 6 October 2022, Dr. Denis Mukwege appealed for the construction of "dignified" graves for the bodies discarded in mass graves to be exhumed and laid in a memorialized burial.

== Background ==
The long-standing clashes between Banyamulenge and Zairean forces persisted throughout the 1980s but reached a boiling point in 1996 during the First Congo War. The conflict was stoked by successive waves of arbitrary arrests and detentions of Tutsi civilians by Zairian police and soldiers. At that time, Zaire was mired in extreme turmoil and widespread violence, firmly ensnared by the oppressive grip of the entrenched and autocratic dictator, Mobutu Sese Seko. The AFDL, an insurgent group rooted in the eastern part of the country, was resolute in its mission to dismantle Mobutu's regime. It emerged as a pivotal rebel faction, uniting with Laurent-Désiré Kabila's broad-based coalition to overthrow Mobutu, whose imperious and kleptocratic rule had plunged the nation into decades of chaos, underdevelopment, and economic stagnation. The AFDL was backed by Rwanda and Uganda, which had their own strategic economic interests in the region and a long history of involvement in the country's affairs and provided military and logistical support.

The AFDL's campaign was charged with widespread human rights abuses, including extrajudicial killings, forced disappearances, and assaults on Zairean civilians. AFDL were also charged with targeting local chiefs and community leaders who opposed their military advance, a tactic aimed at weakening their support base and base and consolidating their authority.

== Attack ==
The attack took place in Lemera Hospital, about 85 kilometers northwest of Uvira. According to Amnesty International, the AFDL forces stormed the hospital, callously looting the hospital's medical supplies and equipments before unleashing a wave of violence against the defenseless patients. The attackers brutally killed those who were too weak or injured to flee, including two nurses, Kadaguza and Simbi, and an assistant nurse. According to the DRC Mapping Report, approximately 37 people were killed in their beds, either by "bullets or bayonets". Most of the victims were FAZ (Forces Armées Zaïroises) soldiers who had been wounded in fighting against AFDL and sought medical assistance at the hospital. The nurses, who had been providing life-saving care to the patients, were also targeted and killed in their quarters. The attack also claimed the lives of Zairean civilians who were in the vicinity of the hospital.

Denis Mukwege was serving as a medical director when AFDL forces attacked the hospital. He took refuge in Nairobi before ultimately returning to the DRC, where he became a powerful advocate for the oppressed and silenced communities.

== Aftermath ==
The massacre caused widespread outrage throughout the country, particularly among the Bafuliiru community, who continue to seek justice, reparations for victims, and institutional reform to this day. Congolese human rights activists and organizations are lobbying for the country to adopt a comprehensive national strategy for transitional justice, a critical step towards guaranteeing lasting peace. Denis Mukwege, a key figure in these advocacy efforts, has been steadfast in his insistence that the recommendations of the United Nations Mapping Report be fully implemented so that the perpetrators should be held accountable for their actions. He has also called for the dignified exhumation of the bodies from the mass graves and the construction of a memorial to honor and remember the victims.

== See also ==
- Makobola massacre
- Kipupu massacre
- Kishishe massacre
- Kasika
- Katogota
- Bwegera
- Lubarika
- Kamanyola
- Minembwe
- Mulenge
