= Evangelical University in Africa =

Coordinates: 2°32′32″S 28°51′34″E

- Université évangélique en Afrique
- Type: Private university
- Established: 1991
- Affiliations: AUF (Agence Universitaire de la Francophonie)
- Rector: NGONGO Kilongo Fatuma
- Location: Bukavu, South Kivu, Democratic Republic of the Congo
- Language: French
- Website: uea.ac.cd

The Evangelical University in Africa (UEA) is a private interdenominational Christian evangelical university located in Bukavu, South Kivu province, in the Democratic Republic of the Congo. The language of instruction is French.

== History ==
The university was founded in 1990 by the Community of Pentecostal Churches in Central Africa of the Church of Christ in the Congo.

Its first authorization to operate was granted on 26 September 1991 under the name "Protestant Evangelical University in Africa" by Ministerial Decree No. ESU/CAB.MIN/0253/91 dated 26 September 1991.

The first approval and recognition of first-cycle degrees were confirmed by Ministerial Decree No. ESU/CAB.MIN/0313/92, while the second approval and recognition of second-cycle degrees were confirmed by Ministerial Decree No. ESU/CAB.MIN/A5/175/95 dated 9 December 1995. The final accreditation of UEA by presidential decree No. 06/106 was issued on 12 June 2006.

== Faculties ==
As of 2020, the university had 5 faculties:

- Faculty of Agricultural and Environmental Sciences (with two departments: Phytotechnics and Zootechnics). The first engineers graduated from this faculty in the 1995–1996 academic year, with 11 graduates: 6 zootechnicians and 5 phytotechnicians.

 * Department of Phytotechnics and Environment
 * Department of Zootechnics and Environment

- Faculty of Medicine
- Faculty of Social Sciences - * Social Work Department * Peace and Conflict Studies *Psychology
- Faculty of Economics and Management
- Faculty of Protestant Theology

== Partners ==
The school is interdenominational and has various evangelical partner denominations.

== Notable Alumni and Professors ==
- Denis Mukwege
- Kamana
- Dr Amani Kasherwa
