= Seoul Peace Prize =

- Location: Seoul
- Established: 1990
- Website: http://www.spp.or.kr/

The Seoul Peace Prize was established in 1990 as a biennial recognition with monetary award to commemorate the success of the 24th Summer Olympic Games held in Seoul, South Korea, an event in which 160 nations from across the world took part, creating harmony and friendship. The Seoul Peace Prize was established to crystallize the wishes of the Korean people for peace in the Korean Peninsula and the rest of the world. The nominating group, the Seoul Peace Prize Cultural Foundation, consists of 500 Korean nationals and 800 internationals. The awardee receives a diploma, a plaque and honorarium of US$200,000.

Past Seoul Peace Prize recipients have gone on to be nominated and awarded the Nobel Peace Prize, including Médecins Sans Frontières (1996 SPP, 1999 NPP) and Bangladeshi Dr. Muhammad Yunus (2006 SPP, 2006 NPP), the founder of Grameen Bank which pioneered the concept of microcredit for supporting innovators in multiple developing countries in Asia, Africa and Latin America, and also inspired programs such as the Infolady Social Entrepreneurship Programme of Dnet (A Social Enterprise).

== Recipients ==
Year	Recipient	Country
1990	Juan Antonio Samaranch	Spain
1992	George Shultz	United States
1996	Médecins Sans Frontières	Switzerland
1998	Kofi Annan	Ghana
2000	Sadako Ogata	Japan
2002	Oxfam	United Kingdom
2004	Václav Havel	Czech Republic
2006	Muhammad Yunus	Bangladesh
2008	Suzanne Scholte	United States
2010	José Antonio Abreu	Venezuela
2012	Ban Ki-moon	South Korea
2014	Angela Merkel	Germany
2016	Denis Mukwege	Democratic Republic of the Congo
2018	Narendra Modi	India
2020	Thomas Bach	Germany
2022	Tim Berners-Lee	United Kingdom
2025	Direct Relief	United States
