= Free North Korea Radio =

South Korean radio broadcaster

The Free North Korea Radio (Korean: 자유북한방송; Hanja: 自由北韓放送; RR: Jayu Bukhan Bangsong) is a radio broadcaster based in Seoul, South Korea. The station is run primarily by North Korean refugees and defectors and frequently broadcasts shortwave transmissions of news and information to the general population inside North Korea. The radio was established by Kim Seong-min, a former North Korean military monitor for foreign broadcasts, who was influenced by the foreign broadcasts that he monitored and defected from North Korea in 1996.

Free North Korea Radio has received an award from Reporters Without Borders in acknowledgement of its efforts.

Free North Korea Radio started broadcasting from Seoul in 2004. It is a project of the Defense Forum Foundation, a U.S.-based nonprofit organization.

In 2025 it was one of the few remaining outlets broadcasting into North Korea, as Voice of America and Radio Free Asia stopped their Korean language broadcasts following American cuts for international projects that mostly dismantled the United States Agency for Global Media that was supervising such projects.

== Threats ==
Free North Korea Radio staff have been assaulted repeatedly by South Korean extremist groups who support the North Korean regime or fear the destabilizing effect of their broadcasts. Radio staff had to relocate to the outskirts of Seoul in 2005.

In July 2020, the Washington Times reported on a cyber attack targeting individuals involved with Free North Korea Radio, including its co-founder Suzanne Scholte. The phishing scam impersonated a prominent journalist from The Atlantic, Uri Friedman, and asked interview questions of Scholte, which security experts told the Washington Times were part of a larger cyber operation.

In response to news of the cyber attack, Col. David Maxwell, an analyst on North Korea, commented: "It's not surprising that [Scholte] would have been targeted." Maxwell said, "I think the regime is focused on her organization because of the radio broadcasts...Shortwave radio broadcasts are one of the most effective ways to get outside information into North Korea, and the information has an effect."

== Types of broadcasts ==
Free North Korea Radio broadcasts a variety of news and information into North Korea, including news of current events happening within North Korea. The organization relies on a network of anonymous sources inside North Korea for this information, which it also publishes on its Korean-language website.

== Funding ==
As of 2008, Free North Korea Radio received an annual grant from the U.S. National Endowment for Democracy. In 2019 former special envoy for North Korea human rights Robert R. King stated it was "supported by some U.S. government funds".

As of 2020, Free North Korea Radio's English language website stated that it no longer received funding of any kind from the U.S. government.

== Frequency ==
Broadcast time（KST）	Frequency
22:00 – 23:00	11510 kHz
05:00 – 06:00	7550 kHz

- South Korean standard time:UTC+09:00
- Frequencies as of April 2020.

== See also ==
- Fighters for a Free North Korea
- Park Sang-hak
- Suzanne Scholte
- North Korea Freedom Coalition
- Kim Seong-min
