= Panzi Hospital =

Geography
- Location: Bukavu, Sud-Kivu, Democratic Republic of the Congo
- Coordinates: 2.543149°S 28.867902°E

Organisation
- Type: Specialist
- Religious affiliation: Community of Pentecostal Churches in Central Africa

Services
- Speciality: Treatment of survivors of violence

History
- Opened: 1999

Links
- Website: www.panzihospitalbukavu.org

Panzi Hospital (French: Hôpital de Panzi) is a hospital in Bukavu, the capital of the Sud-Kivu province in the Democratic Republic of the Congo. It specializes in treating survivors of sexual violence, particularly conflict-related sexual violence.

== History ==
The Panzi Hospital was founded in 1999 by Dr. Denis Mukwege with the support of the Community of Pentecostal Churches in Central Africa (CEPAC), itself founded by the Swedish Pentecostal Mission in 1921. Director Denis Mukwege has been operating on survivors of sexual violence for over a decade, and is one of only two doctors qualified to perform the reconstructive surgery. He published an analysis of the sexual violence crisis in eastern DRC in PLoS Medicine in December 2009, based on his extensive, first-hand experience. Dr. Mukwege is the recipient of the UN 2008 Human Rights Award, the 2014 Sakharov Prize, and the 2018 Nobel Peace Prize.

Despite its support network and the overwhelming need for the services it provides, the Panzi Hospital continually faces a shortage of money, supplies, and resources to expand its base of qualified personnel. The hospital was initially built for 120 beds but the total number of beds is now 350, out of which 200 are devoted to sexual violence survivors. On average, Panzi admits 410 patients per month and in 2007 it was said to be running at maximum capacity.

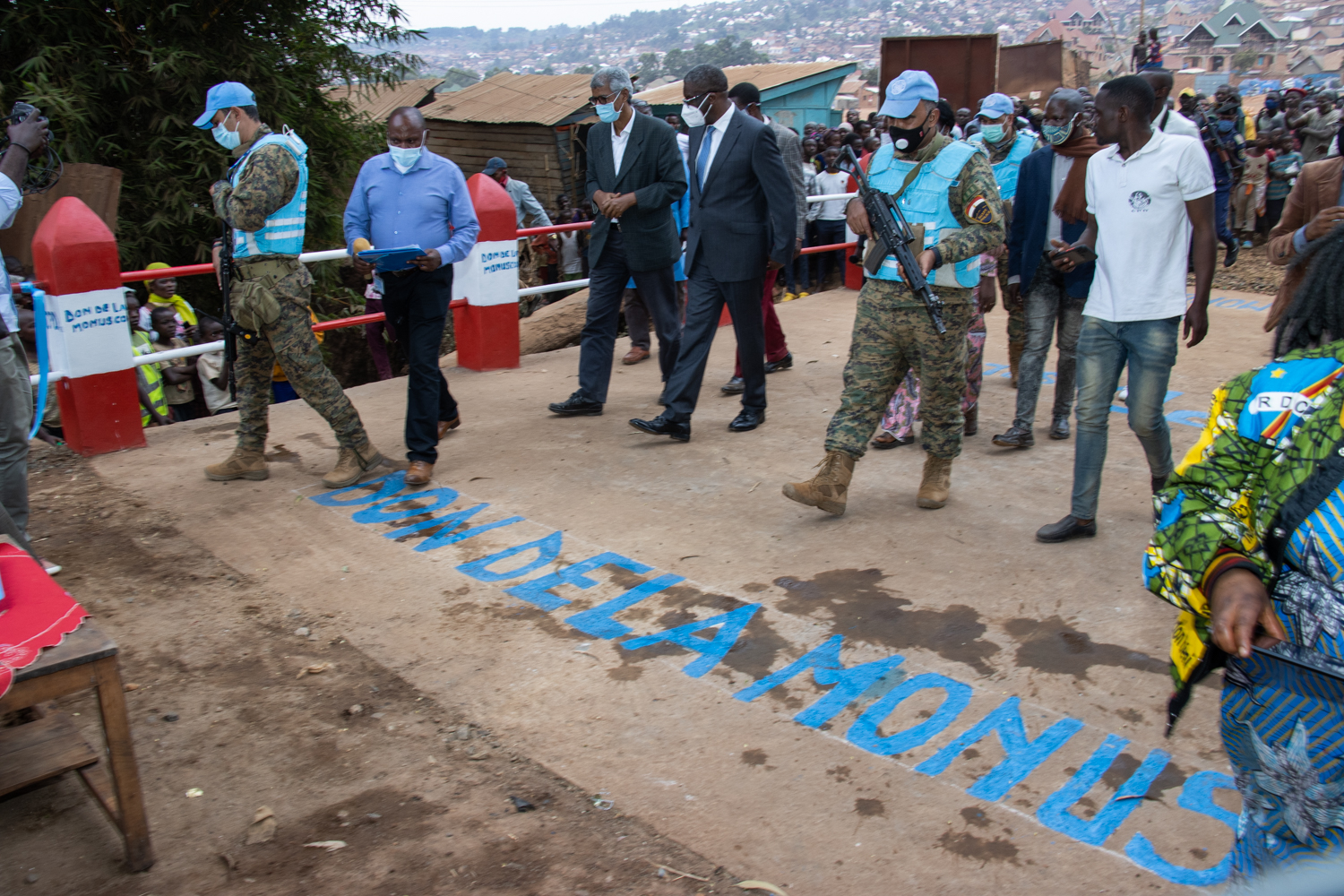
Dr Denis Mukwege went out to help open the Kamagema bridge.

In August 2021 the UN force MONUSCO completed the rebuilding of the Kamagema Bridge in the Panzi area of Bukavu. The bridge had been destroyed by rebel forces. Dr Denis Mukwege went out to help open the bridge.

== See also ==
- Social Aid For the Elimination of Rape (SAFER)
