= Lemera =

Town in Uvira Territory, South Kivu, DR Congo

- Grouping
- Groupement de Lemera
- Interactive map of Lemera
- Location in DR Congo
- Coordinates: 3°02′07″S 28°59′08″E
- Country: Democratic Republic of the Congo
- Province: South Kivu
- Territory: Uvira
- Chiefdom: Bafuliiru

Government
  - Chef de groupement: Edmond Simba Muhogo

Area
  - Total: 37,527 km^{2} (14,489 sq mi)

Population (2015)
  - Total: 288,293
- Time zone: UTC+2 (CAT)

Lemera is one of the groupements (groupings) within the Bafuliiru Chiefdom, serving as the chief town of the chiefdom. Positioned in the northwestern part of Uvira Territory, Lemera spans an area of 37,527 square kilometers and, as of 2015, has an estimated population of 288,293, predominantly comprising Fuliiru people. Lemera shares borders with the Itara-Luvungi groupement to the north, the Kigoma groupement to the south, the Itombwe sector in Mwenga Territory to the west, and National Road No. 5 (a road connecting Bukavu and Uvira) and the Ruzizi River to the east.

Situated within the Ruzizi Plain, the region is predominantly agricultural, with residents cultivating cassava, beans, and maize. Fishing is also widespread, with local fishermen catching tilapia and other fish from Lake Tanganyika.

== History ==
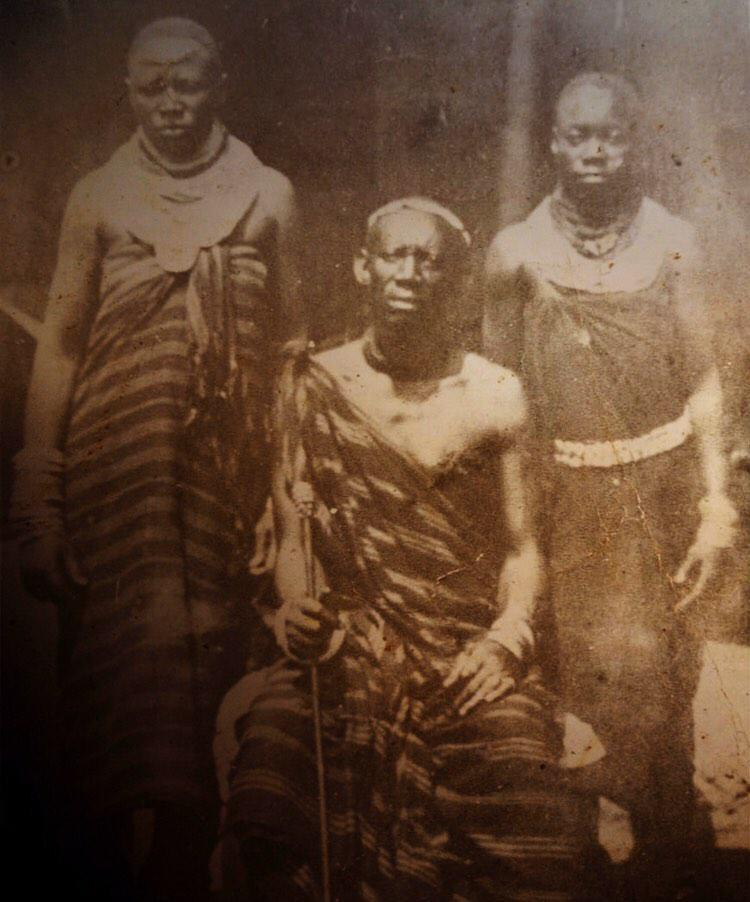
Mwami Nyamugira Mukogabwe II of Bafuliiru Chiefdom in Lemera, 1925

Lemera was established as one of five groupements forming the Bafuliiru Chiefdom when it was created on 28 March 1911 and officially ratified on 20 March 1923. However, several historical accounts assert that the Bafuliiru Chiefdom was formally recognized on 18 August 1928, coinciding with its incorporation into the newly formed Uvira Territory alongside the Bavira and Ruzizi Plain Chiefdoms. Serving as the chiefdom's capital, it was predominantly ruled by the Bahamba Dynasty from the Bahamba clan of the Fuliiru people. According to historian Bishikwabo Chubaka, the name Lemera traces back to Mulemera, a chief from the Balemera clan of the Fuliiru.

In the 1950s, Lemera saw its first phase of significant infrastructural development with the construction of a large, white-painted church, seating around 2,000 people, by Swedish Pentecostal missionaries from the Swedish Free Mission (Mission Libre Suédoise, MLS), now known as the Pentecostal Churches in Central Africa (Communauté des Églises de Pentecôte en Afrique Centrale, CEPAC).

During the 1970s, Lemera was a modest settlement, with its population estimated at 500 to 1,000 by Swedish missionary Wanja Karlsson. Most residents lived in simple mud houses, often shared by extended families of up to ten people. A notable communal house, constructed from brick, stood out among the mud structures. The local economy relied on agriculture, producing fruits, vegetables, rice, beans, pork, and goat meat, supplemented by goods such as salt, fabrics, batteries, and medicines. Healthcare and educational infrastructure expanded significantly during this period. Under the leadership of Jean Ruhigita Ndagora Bugwika, the CEPAC initiated the construction of Lemera Hospital in 1970, which was completed in 1971 with seven operational buildings, five residential units, six apartments for Swedish missionaries, a guesthouse, and a school for Swedish children. In 1981, with funding from the Swedish International Development Agency (SIDA), Jean Bugwika oversaw the construction of halls and a hydroelectric dam to provide electricity and water to the hospital and the broader Lemera's populace. In 1984, pipes were laid to transport water from a spring located 180 meters above Lemera to the mission station.

== Administrative division ==
=== Villages ===
Lemera groupement is administratively subdivided into villages:

- Kiringye
- Kidote
- Langala
- Bwesho
- Mahungu/Mahungubwe
- Narunanga
- Namutiri
- Lungutu
- Kahanda
- Kigurwe
- Ndunda

== Security problems ==
Lemera has a long history of conflict and political instability, which has led to ongoing security concerns for its residents and visitors alike. The region has experienced various periods of violence and unrest, with armed groups and militia factions operating in the area. In April 1964, during the Simba rebellion, the broader Kivu Province experienced widespread unrest. Rebels launched attacks across the region, including on the Pentecostal mission facilities in Uvira, which were destroyed. In Lemera, a rebel attack on a house resulted in several injuries and one fatality. The unrest forced many students at the seminary and UNESCO-affiliated educators to abandon the area, with the latter being evacuated under the protection of United Nations forces. By May 1964, rebels had seized control of the Ruzizi Plain, encompassing the strategic corridor between Bukavu and Uvira, effectively entrapping missionaries stationed in Lemera. After negotiations with a rebel leader, they were able to escape to Burundi in June 1964. During this tumultuous period, Lemera became a refuge for displaced persons, with the Lemera camp housing approximately 33,400 people, with each hut accommodating up to 15 people.

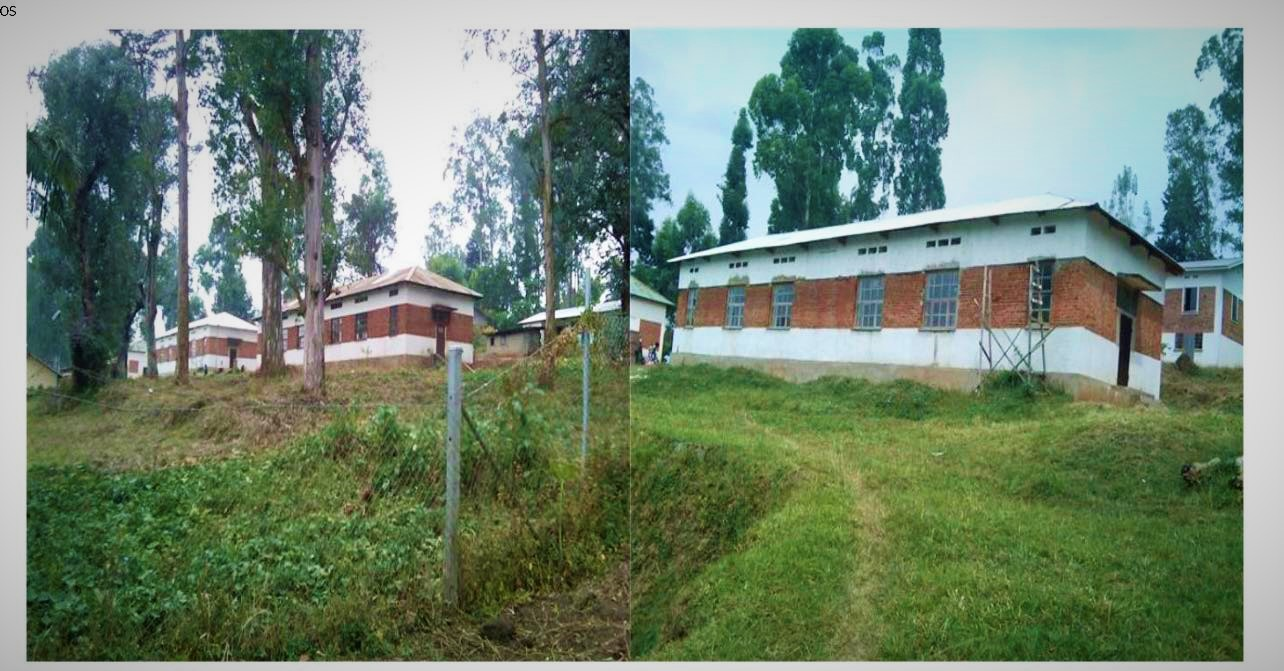
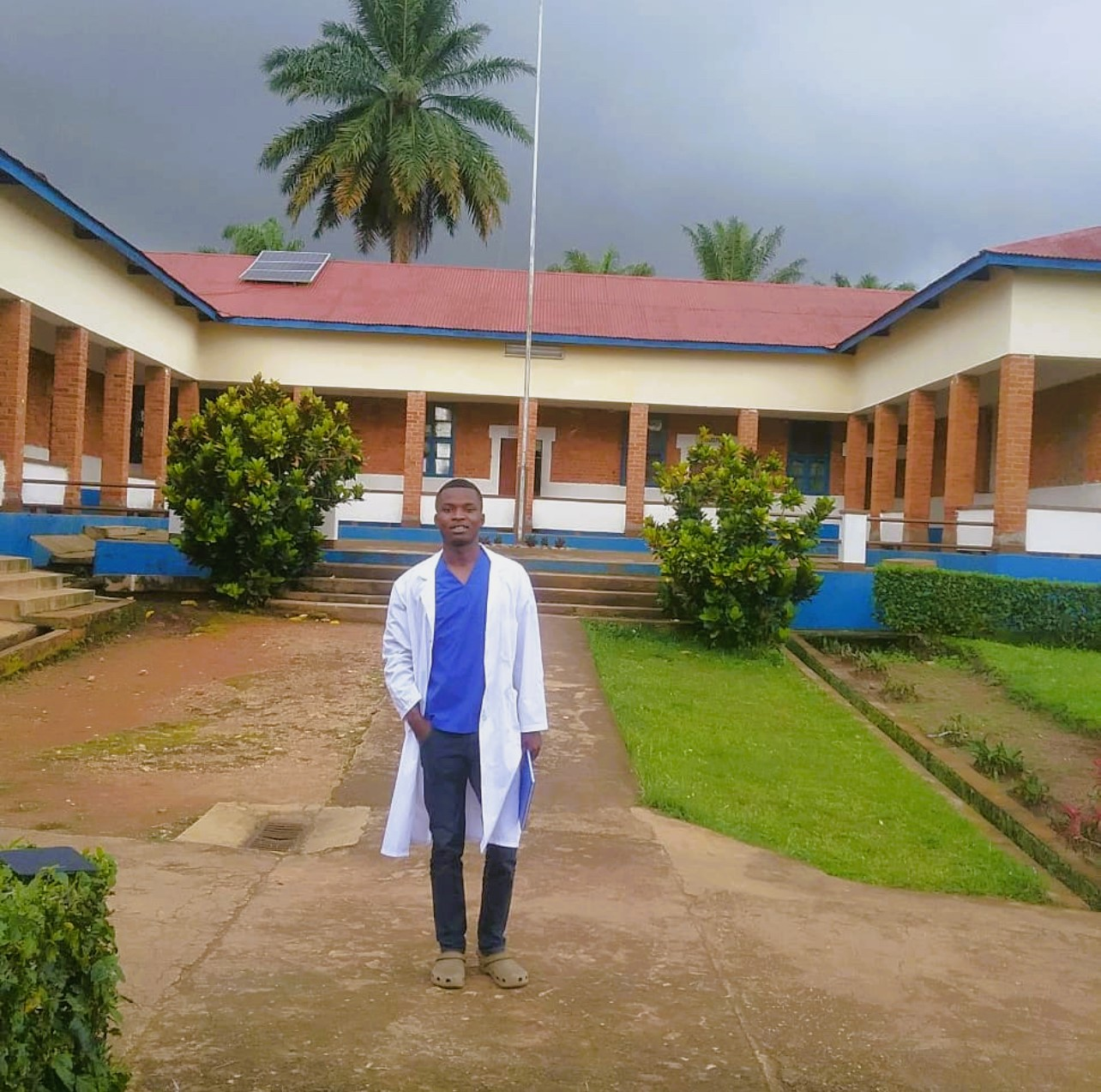
The Lemera Hospital, where the massacre took place

In the late 1990s and early 2000s, the First and Second Congo Wars ravaged the region. During the First Congo War, Lemera Hospital functioned as a military medical facility, providing care for both Forces Armées Zaïroises (FAZ) personnel and civilians. On 6 October 1996, the hospital was attacked by Banyamulenge-led armed groups, supported by Rwanda and Uganda. This event, known as the Lemera massacre, resulted in the deaths of 37 people, including two medical staff members, and involved significant vandalism of the hospital premises.

In February 2014, unknown attackers stole 96 cows in the Ruzizi Plain. Additional livestock thefts were reported in nearby groupements, while in Lemera, herders accused rebels from Burundi's National Liberation Front (FNL) of taking 17 cows from Namutiri. On 10 April 2018, FARDC forces killed Mai-Mai leader Espoir Karakara during a shootout in Rugeje, Kigoma. On 23 April, two of his group's fighters, including his younger brother, who had assumed leadership, were killed near Kigoma while seeking revenge. That same night, Mai-Mai militiamen also kidnapped several people in Mahungubwe village near Lemera, including Pastor Musavi Djuma of the 8th CEPAC, reportedly taken by the Kihebe faction. On the night of 13–14 October, four unidentified armed men abducted Ngiriho Kasome Seba, a journalist with Radio Communautaire de Lemera (RCL), along with his 16-year-old son in Kazunguzibwa, a village within Lemera. The kidnappers, reportedly associated with the Mai-Mai Buuhirwa militia, held Ngiriho hostage in Luberizi and demanded a ransom of $1,200, accusing him of broadcasting reports about cattle theft by militiamen. Although his son was released the following morning, Ngiriho was detained until 17 October, when he was freed after a $620 ransom was paid. On 2 August 2019, an eco-guard was fatally assaulted during an incursion by Raïa Mutomboki at the Lemera post. Subsequent military offensives launched by the Armed Forces of the Democratic Republic of the Congo (FARDC) on 26 November targeted Rwandan Hutu rebels affiliated with the CNRD-FDLR in neighboring Kalehe Territory, resulting in the displacement of over 3,000 civilians. Many of these displaced people sought refuge in Lemera and its surrounding areas, including Chambombo, Bihovu, Shanje, Numbi, Bibatama, Kalungu, Nyabibwe, Bushushu, Kasheke, Nyamugari and Chirimiro. From 22–23 April 2021, inter-communal clashes between the Ngumino militia, predominantly composed of Banyamulenge, and the Mai-Mai Biloze Bishambuke militia, primarily consisting of Bafuliiru, engulfed villages such as Kifune, Mukono, Gaso, Bijojo, and Gongwe within Lemera, as well as the Kigoma groupements. By 24 April, the violent clashes culminated in eight fatalities—four members from each militia faction. The skirmishes resulted in extensive devastation, including the incineration of villages and educational institutions. On 29 April, Ngumino militias looted 75 cattle from Kanono village, located 44 kilometers northwest of Lemera.

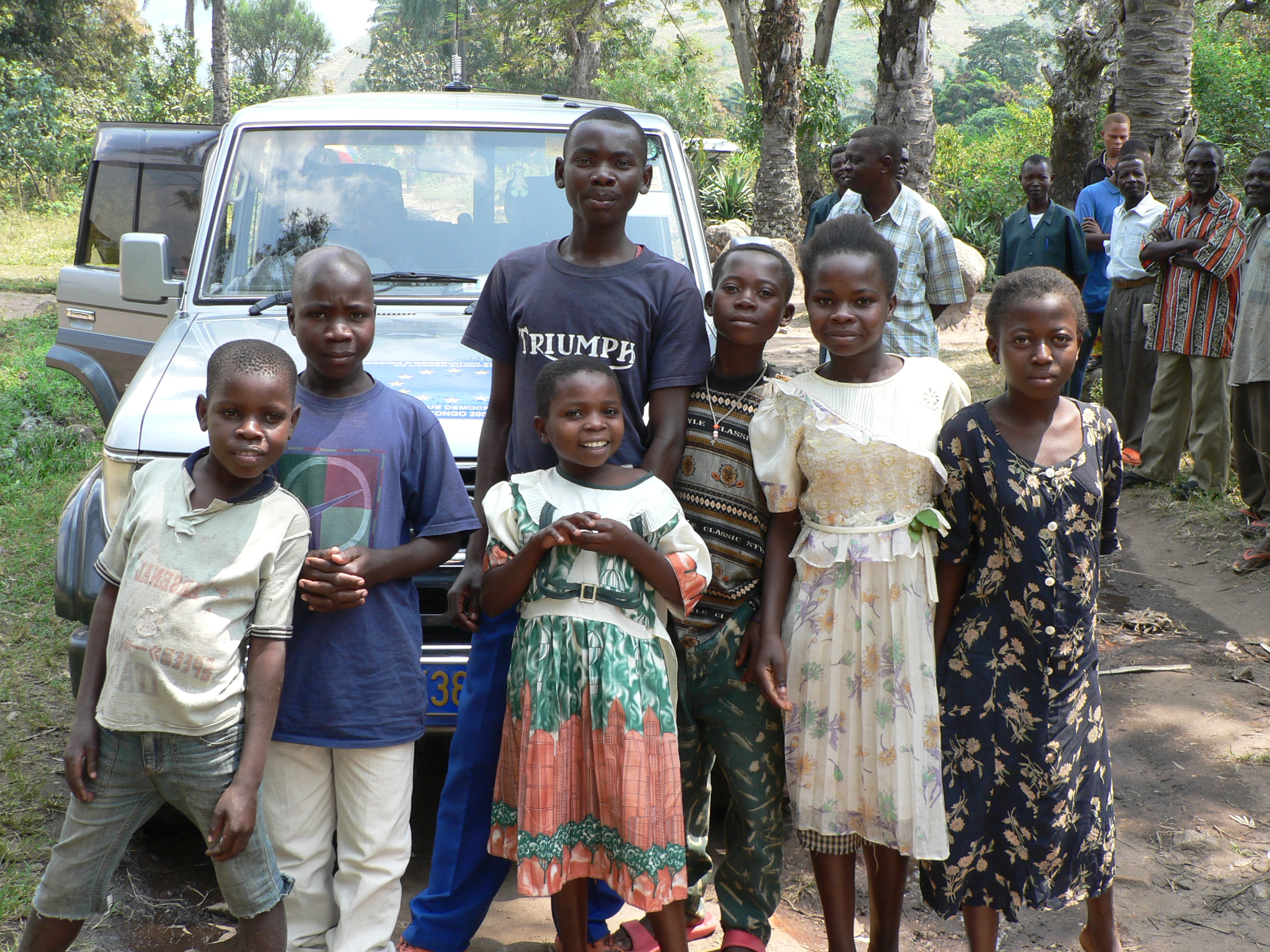
Children of Lemera

On 8 May 2021, Stijn Houben, the regional head of the International Committee of the Red Cross's South Kivu and Maniema sub-delegation, announced expanded relief efforts for displaced persons in conflict-affected zones, including Fizi Territory, Uvira Territory and Itombwe. On 12 May, the Twigwaneho rebel faction (aligned with the Banyamulenge) and allies led by Colonel Michel Rukunda, alias Makanika, attacked a Mai-Mai Biloze Bishambuke camp in Masango village, in the Bijombo groupement of the neighboring Bavira Chiefdom. Meanwhile, northeast of Lemera, clashes between Ngumino militiamen and the Mai-Mai coalition and FNL left seven people dead in the Kifuni village, northeast of Lemera. The violence has disproportionately impacted women. According to the Association des Femmes des Médias (AFEM), between 1–28 October 2021, 73 cases of women's rights violations were documented. These included rape, kidnapping, accusations of witchcraft, and lynching. Among the abductees were 11 women, including eight Burundian refugees from the Lusenda camp in Fizi Territory, one in Lemera, and two in Uvira.

On 19 December, over 380 heavily armed Burundi National Defence Force (FDNB) commandos traversed Lemera en route to confront the Burundian RED-Tabara rebels. Subsequently, on 3 January 2022, RED-Tabara declared via a tweet that its forces had engaged in combat against the FDNB in the highlands of South Kivu, specifically in Gashenyo and Kitembe, resulting in at least 10 fatalities and approximately 20 injuries on the opposing side. In February 2022, the Femme au Fone project reported alarming statistics on witchcraft accusations, domestic violence, and lynching, with Lemera accounted for five lynching fatalities. In April 2022, the resurgence of the March 23 Movement (M23), which occupied several eastern localities, precipitated an influx of displaced civilians seeking refuge in Lemera. Eric Muvomo, coordinator of ACMEJ/Katogota, reported that nearly 100 displaced children were taken in by the NGO Espace d'Amis d'Enfance (EAE) in Kidote, situated within Lemera's middle plateau.

== Economy ==
Subsistence farming and livestock rearing are the main economic activities. Major crops include cassava, beans, peanuts, coffee, peas, bananas, rice, corn, sorghum, wheat, and soybeans as well as fruits like oranges, mangoes, mandarins, guavas, and avocados. Market gardening is practiced in certain areas of the region, with cassava being cultivated extensively throughout Lemera. Beans, grown centrally between Rubanga and Mulenge, serve as a staple in local cuisine, commonly accompanied by bugali, a starchy dough-like dish made from boiled and pounded ingredients such as cassava, and as an export commodity. Beans are sold in Bukavu and Uvira, with significant quantities also exported to neighboring countries, Burundi and Rwanda. Coffee cultivation, classified as one of the region's industrial crops, is significant in Lemera. Additionally, peanuts are exported to Rwanda and Burundi, with a portion sold in Bukavu.

== Culture ==
=== Cuisine ===
Staple foods include cassava, plantains, beans, maize, peas, and rice, which are typically paired with a variety of meats, fish, and vegetables. Local delicacies, such as bugali (a starchy dough), sambaza or ndakala (small dried kapenta), sombe, njombo (protopterus), kijoli (Astatotilapia burtoni), kambale (clarias), Tanganyika killifish, mukeke (sleek lates), Lake Tanganyika sprat, Nile perch, and porridge, are popular among both residents. Traditionally, meals are often eaten twice daily, one early in the morning and one in the evening. Festive events, such as parties, often feature meat dishes, with chicken being the most common choice. The preparation of food and household tasks, including farming, firewood collection, and water retrieval, are traditionally carried out by women. They cultivate the land using hoes, plant and tend crops, and harvest tubers, which are then processed into staples like porridge.

=== Religion ===
Christianity is the predominant religion, with a strong influence from the Pentecostal tradition. The town is home to a large, white-painted church operated by the Communauté des Églises de Pentecôte en Afrique Centrale (CEPAC), which can accommodate approximately 2,000 worshippers. Religious services are primarily conducted in Swahili, with sermons often interpreted into Kifuliru to ensure accessibility for the local Fuliiru-speaking population. In addition to Swahili-translated versions of the Bible, portions of the scripture have also been translated into Kifuliru.
