= Kim Seong-min (defector) =

North Korean democracy activist (1962–2025)

- Kim in 2015
- Born: 1962; Huichon, Chagang Province, North Korea
- Died: 12 September 2025 (aged 63); Seoul, South Korea
- Education: Kim Hyong Jik University of Education
- Occupations: Activist, Radio Broadcaster
- Known for: Director of Free North Korea Radio
- Spouse: Moon Myong-dok
- Children: 1

Korean name
- Hangul: 김성민
- Hanja: 金聖玟
- RR: Gim Seongmin
- MR: Kim Sŏngmin

Kim Seong-min (Korean: 김성민; 1962 – 12 September 2025) was a North Korean–born democracy activist who was the director of Free North Korea Radio.

In 1996, while serving as a propaganda writer for the North Korean army, Kim defected and fled to China. He was captured by Chinese authorities, interrogated, and sent back on a train to Pyongyang, where he was to be executed. Kim jumped from the moving train and made it back to China, eventually escaping to South Korea in 1999.

In 2004, Kim helped to establish Free North Korea Radio, which has received awards and recognition from Reporters Without Borders, the Taiwan Foundation for Democracy, and the Bush administration.

== Life in North Korea ==
Kim Seong-min was born in 1962 in Huichon, Chagang, North Korea, but was raised in Pyongyang. His father, Kim Sun-sok, was a poet and a professor at Kim Il Sung University. His mother was a well-known journalist. Kim Seong-min also aspired to be a poet, writing in both North and South Korea.

In 1978, after finishing high school, Kim joined the North Korean army and served for the mandatory 10 year period in the 620th Camp artillery unit. He then attended Kim Hyong Jik College of Education until being commissioned as a propaganda writer with the 620th Camp, attaining the rank of captain.

== Defection to South Korea ==
Kim Seong-min's uncle lived in South Korea, and when one of his letters to his uncle was intercepted by North Korean authorities, Kim was accused of espionage. Additionally, Kim came under investigation because other soldiers in his unit had stolen musical instruments from a nearby town. He defected and fled to China in 1996, escaping via the Tumen River.

Kim made it to the Chinese city of Dalian, where he was caught by Chinese authorities and interrogated for forty days. He was then taken to the border town of Taowen and was subjected to interrogational torture by North Korean authorities, eventually admitting his identity. He was sentenced to death and was taken aboard a train heading to Pyongyang.

On 30 April 1997, he jumped from the moving train to avoid execution. About two months later, he made it back into China, where he remained for two years. During this time, he worked in a factory in Yanji, converted to Christianity, and married an ethnic Korean woman, while constantly needing to hide from Chinese and North Korean security forces. With counterfeit documents provided by his uncle in South Korea, Kim was able to fly from China to South Korea, arriving in Seoul in February 1999.

== Free North Korea Radio ==
In 2004, Kim helped found Free North Korea Radio with Suzanne Scholte. Free North Korea Radio has since been awarded by Reporters Without Borders their "Prize for Press Freedom" and the "Asia Democracy and Human Rights Award" from the Taiwan Foundation for Democracy.

Kim was motivated to begin broadcasting news and information into North Korea in part after listening to KBS programming, which used honorifics to refer to Kim Jong Il. He said, "This was not the way radio stations should be referring to Kim Jong Il if they were trying to subvert the listeners." At the same time, South Korea stopped broadcasting into North Korea. Kim said, "We realized it could be, and should be, up to us North Korean defectors to start broadcasts into North Korea." He had also been inspired, when still in North Korea, by leaflets dropped from aircraft sent from South Korea, and by an illegally held radio.

One feature of the station's broadcasts was the use of North Korean dialects and use of language in a way that would be understood by the target audience. Among its programs, Free North Korea Radio broadcasts local North Korean news supplied by a series of freelance journalists inside North Korea. In 2007, its secret reporters in North Korea were all arrested. Their whereabouts are currently unknown, and Kim told the Independent that their arrests "devastated" him. "The stress of knowing that could happen again is very hard to bear."

In 2006, Kim met George W. Bush and was honored by the Bush administration. His interview is a permanent feature of the George W. Bush Institute Freedom Collection.

=== Security threats ===
Kim Seong-min lived with 24-hour police protection due to threats on his life from the North Korean government.

Kim received numerous threats, including postal packages containing mouse carcasses that were sent to his office, as well as a phone call warning him that his sisters would be hurt if he continued to criticize North Korea. In 2012, North Korea accused Kim of being behind an alleged plot to destroy statues of North Korean leaders. Kim denied any involvement, but he was threatened with "merciless retaliation".

== Personal life and death ==
Kim and his wife, Moon Myong-dok, had a daughter.

Kim died from metastatic lung cancer in Seoul on 12 September 2025, at the age of 63.
