= Jean Ruhigita Ndagora Bugwika =

Congolese evangelist and community leader (1927–1993)

- Legal Representative of the 8th CEPAC Church
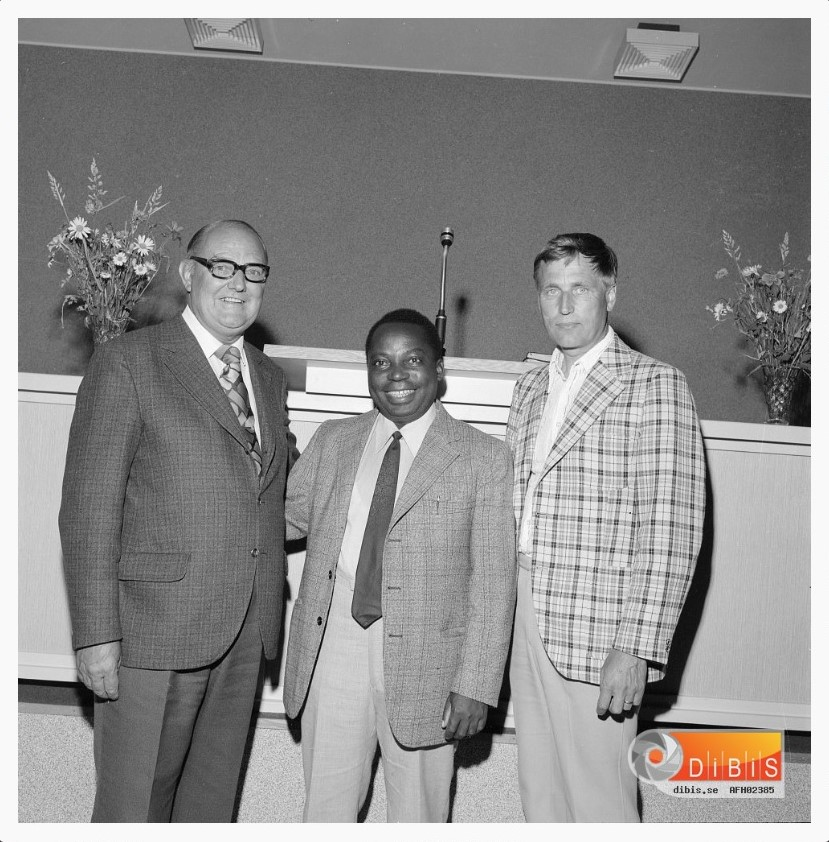
- Ruhigita in Alfta, Sweden, July 1973
- Native name: Ruhigita Ndagora Bugwika
- Church: 8th CEPAC Lemera Church (8ème Église CEPAC Lemera)
- In office: 1960 to 1992
- Successor: Menhe Mushunganya Luanda

Orders
- Ordination: 1960 by Lewi Pethrus, Hareld Gustafsson, Wills Sawe and August Brissier.
- Consecration: 1945 by William Backman

Personal details
- Born: Ruhigita Ndagora Bugwika; 1927 Kiliba, Democratic Republic of the Congo
- Died: 17 October 1993 (aged 65–66)
- Denomination: Christianity
- Parents: Majagira Muhasha Mwene Bugwika and Shegamo Nakitami
- Spouse: Helena

Jean Ruhigita Ndagora Bugwika (1927 – 17 October 1993), widely known as Ruhigita Ndagora, was a Congolese evangelist, superintendent, educator and pastor. Over the course of his 32-year tenure as the Legal Representative of the 8th CEPAC (formerly Communauté des Eglises de Pentecôte au Zaïre; CEPZA) church, he helped establish Lemera Hospital, Pinga Hospital, and 35 health centers to expand healthcare services across the region. His work also included the establishment of 56 social centers offering literacy and tailoring training, along with 412 primary and secondary schools.

In recognition of his contributions, he was made a Knight of the National Order of the Leopard (Ordre national du Léopard) in 1980.

== Early life, education and ministry ==
Jean Ruhigita was born Jean Ruhigita Ndagora Bugwika in 1927 in Buhula (present-day Kiliba), Uvira, in the Belgian Congo's Kivu region, to Fuliiru parents Majagira Muhasha Mwene Bugwika and Shegamo Nakitami. Ruhigita's ancestral village was Munanira Labwe, and his family belonged to the Mulabwe clan. He was one of ten children, consisting of seven boys and three girls, born to his father's four wives. His birth name, Ruhigita Ndagora Bugwika, is derived from Kifuliiru, with "Ruhigita" signifying leadership and authority, "Ndagora" referring to calmness and the avoidance of conflict, and "Bugwika" describing a seedling expected to grow and bear fruit. His father gave him the names "Majagira" and "Ndagora", but he preferred the latter because of its positive meaning.

In 1935, aged eight, Ruhigita came into contact with Swedish Protestant missionaries who were establishing the Swedish Free Mission (Mission Libre Suédoise; MLS) in Balabwe, now known as Ndegu Katobo in Kiliba. Among the early missionaries were Karl Lemuel, David and Svea Flood, Karl Julius and Ruth Aspenlind, Ruth Jonasson, Bert and Joel Eriksson, Harald Jönsson, Ruth Aronsson, and Arthur Berg. In 1938, Erik Gösta Palmertz settled in Munanira Labwe, and Ruhigita became interested in Palmertz's preaching, particularly his sermon on John 1:29, which influenced his conversion to Christianity in 1939. According to a biographical account by M. Mikererezi Ruhogeza, Ruhigita later reported a vision of Jesus and sought Palmertz's guidance. Before leaving the village, Palmertz encouraged him to continue his religious education in Uvira. However, Ruhigita's parents, who strongly adhered to their traditional religious beliefs, opposed his conversion and forbade him from preaching Christianity.

Expelled from his family home, Ruhigita took refuge in the nearby bush and continued practicing his faith. His parents sent his older brothers, Bahindhi Majagira and Namutibuka Majagira, to bring him back, but Namutibuka converted to Christianity during their encounter. Ruhigita also reported experiencing baptism in the Holy Spirit, speaking in tongues, and having religious visions. After being allowed to return home, he began attracting converts through his preaching. Mikererezi reports that eight people converted within four months, followed by approximately 300 to 400 people from surrounding villages over the following months.

Ruhigita was baptized in Lake Tanganyika at Kasenga in 1944 by MLS missionary William Backman, alongside several dozen other converts. In 1945, he was consecrated as an evangelist and began preaching in his native village of Ndegu, which then had approximately 20 Christians. Backman also taught and mentored him during his primary education at the MLS Uvira-Kasenga school from 1944 to 1947. Although his schooling temporarily interrupted his evangelistic activities, he continued preaching at the Uvira-Kasenga church.In 1950, Ruhigita continued his education at the Protestant Pedagogical Institute of Kivu (Institut Pédagogique Protestant du Kivu; IPPKI) in Lemera, a teacher-training institution established by the MLS in cooperation with the Norwegian Pentecostal Mission (Mission Libre Norvégienne; MLN). Opened on 15 September 1950 under director Linnea Rebecka Halldorf, the school admitted students from Pentecostal churches, including those linked to British missions in Kenya and Tanzania. Each church was invited to send two candidates, who began with a four-month preparatory course. The first group graduated on 15 December 1953. Ruhigita received his teaching diploma that year and returned to Uvira, where he became a mwalimu. He later returned to Lemera when a fourth-year class became available, and completed additional training and obtained a teaching qualification that enabled him to teach at the Lemera School of Pedagogical Apprenticeship (École d'Apprentissage Pédagogique de Lemera).

== Later life and accomplishments ==
=== 1958–1992 ===
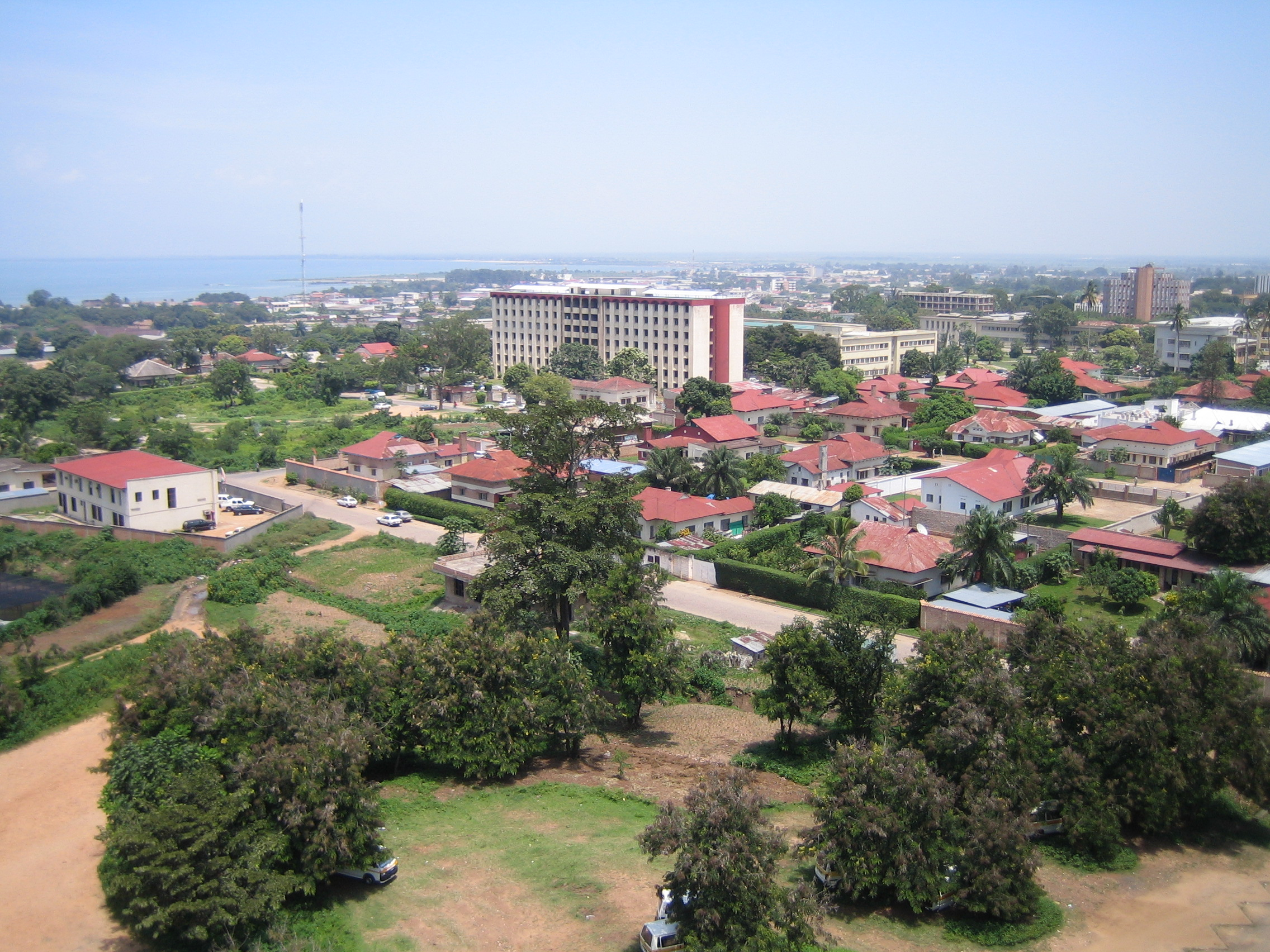
Bujumbura, the site of the 1960 General Assembly of Pentecostal Churches, during which Swedish church leaders handed over responsibilities to African representatives.

In 1958, the Swedish Evangelical Mission (Mission évangélique suédoise; MES) appointed Ruhigita to represent the church at its General Assembly in Belgium. He subsequently visited Sweden, preaching in several cities and towns, including Stockholm, Örebro, Malmö, Gothenburg, Umeå, and Vetlanda. At the 1960 General Assembly of Pentecostal Churches in Bujumbura, Burundi, Swedish church leaders transferred responsibilities to African representatives. Missionaries Lewi Pethrus, Willis Säwe, Harald Gurdboesson, and August Brüsseler consecrated Ruhigita for Congo, Gabriel Kapitula for Rwanda, and Manassé Nafefera for Burundi. Ruhigita later traveled throughout Africa and Europe to preach and learn about church administration. His African journeys included Tanzania, Burundi, Rwanda, Kenya, Egypt, Nigeria, Sudan, and Zimbabwe, while his European activities took him to Sweden, Norway, Belgium, and Switzerland.

He helped establish several primary and secondary schools. In 1964, the MLS was reorganized and officially recognized as the Association des Églises de Pentecôte (AEP). By 1966, the AEP operated 70 primary schools with 315 classes and 17 directors, including six itinerant Swedes and eleven Congolese. The AEP also collaborated with the AELN to establish a girls' school, following a decision made on 22 August 1962. The school served girls from South Kivu's Protestant elite.

In 1972, Marianne Henriksson was invited to establish a girls' school under the AEP. During his tenure, Ruhigita secured approval for 412 primary and secondary schools, 14 Bible schools, the Evangelical University in Africa (Université Évangélique en Afrique; UEA), and the Higher Institute of Evangelical Theology of Kivu (Institut Supérieur de Théologie Évangélique du Kivu; ISTEKI). The CEPZA board of directors also called on church leaders to establish social centers in their communities. Ruhigita later established 56 centers that trained women in sewing, literacy, and small trades suited to local needs. Four Women's Training Centers (Centres de formation féminins; CFF) were established in Panzi, Lemera, Uvira, and Goma.

In 1973, Ruhigita launched a reforestation project to support ECC/8th CEPZA churches in Uvira Territory and Fizi Territory. The project involved planting trees to combat desertification in the Ruzizi Plain. By May 1989, it had reached 27 churches across both territories, with 150,212 seedlings raised.

In 1980, Ruhigita became involved in a leadership dispute with Swedish missionaries, who opposed his administration over his reported reluctance to consult them on church affairs. According to Mikererezi, he occasionally ordered missionaries to return to Sweden within 24 hours. The missionaries sought to replace him with a leader from North Kivu, arguing that South Kivu had dominated the community's leadership since 1960. Ruhigita resisted the proposed change and sought to continue his administration and ongoing projects. In 1983, he began showing signs of hypertension, which persisted despite treatment and dietary changes. Although he continued working, his health gradually deteriorated.

By the early 1990s, he faced growing criticism over the concentration of leadership positions among his relatives and members of the Balabwe clan, who held senior roles in churches, schools, legal representation, and the UEA. Some relatives held senior educational positions in North Kivu, where local church members had fewer opportunities for similar appointments. The deputy legal representative from North Kivu had little authority, while some members of the Bashi community felt excluded from influential positions. These grievances contributed to growing opposition among Swedish missionaries, local pastors, and school administrators in North and South Kivu, with repeated calls for his resignation.

In 1992, a five-member transitional committee was established, chaired by Jules Kyembwa Walumona and including Mene Luanda, Ruhigita, Farini Sihandwe, and Sven Göran Andersson. After the selection of the General Assembly's executive committee by consensus, the previous moderators were retained to oversee its proceedings. Kyembwa served as president, Menhe as vice-president, Ruhigita and Sihandwe as legal representatives, and Roland Stölgren and Andersson as missionary representatives. The committee administered the 8th CEPZA from 1992 to 1993 and oversaw preparations for the community's leadership elections.

=== 1993–2001: Leadership succession and aftermath ===
A week before the August 1993 General Assembly, Ruhigita met with pastors from Uvira Territory and Kabare Territory at his home to discuss his reappointment as legal representative. Mikererezi noted that Swedish missionaries favored Menhe as his replacement, reportedly seeking greater representation for churches in North Kivu. Mikererezi also alleges that churches in South Kivu faced pressure to accept the missionaries' proposals to retain Swedish financial support. In August 1993, the community revised its statutes to establish a board of directors led by a committee serving four-year terms, renewable once, following elections that ended Ruhigita's 33-year leadership of the 8th CEPZA.

The struggle over Ruhigita's succession had developed over several years, as he reportedly had no plans to step down, believing himself still capable of carrying out his responsibilities. Meanwhile, Swedish missionaries and pastors dissatisfied with his leadership sought another candidate. One of those considered was Pastor Kuye Ndondo, who had earned a doctorate in theology and had reportedly undergone four years of preparation for a future leadership role with missionary support. Kuye was expected to challenge Ruhigita in the August 1993 elections, but Menhe ultimately secured the position of legal representative, leaving Kuye as his deputy. According to Mikererezi, the decision was influenced by demands for leadership to pass to North Kivu and concerns over the possible loss of Swedish funding for churches in South Kivu. The change in leadership was followed by several internal crises, including disputes among churches, a reported decline in spiritual life, and growing divisions within the community. Members of the Shi community also began organizing separately.

Members of the Lega community, working within the Synergy of Mission Works in Southern Africa (Synergie des œuvres missionnaires en Afrique australe; SOMA), formed Mashamba Mapya ("new mission fields") to establish additional 8th CEPZA churches in Mwenga Territory and Shabunda Territory. Churches in the Ruzizi Plain organized themselves under Axe Sud-Sud, based in Kiliba and led by Ruhigita's son, Pastor Espoir Bulangalire Majagira Ruhigita. However, disagreements later divided the group into two ethnic communities, the Fuliiru, who made up most of the population in Uvira Territory, and the Vira.

After the death of his father, Ruhigita, Bulangalire sought to succeed him in the leadership of the 8th CEPAC and entered the 2001 election process. His plans met resistance from Swedish missionaries of the Philadelphia Church in Stockholm, who believed that leadership should not remain within the same family. They also considered him difficult to work with. While the other candidates traveled across North Kivu and South Kivu to meet pastors and gain their support, Bulangalire remained in France throughout the campaign.

Bulangalire's role at the UEA also drew criticism from Swedish missionaries and some founding members of local churches, who opposed the continued influence of the Ruhigita family and its supporters, known as the "Ruhigiste" movement. His marriage to a French woman became another source of disagreement, as some Swedish missionaries feared that her influence might lead him away from their religious views. These concerns were linked to earlier criticism of the UEA, which opponents had regarded as a private university dominated by Ruhigita and his relatives. The missionaries and other founding members therefore called for Bulangalire to leave the institution so that its administration could return to the 8th CEPAC.

== Legacy ==
Ruhigita's removal from leadership had a serious effect on his health, which declined rapidly in the following weeks. On the morning of Sunday, 17 October 1993, he began feeling unwell and complained of coldness while resting in an armchair. He died that day, about two months after losing his position. His remains were taken to Kiliba for burial at his church. His death came as a surprise to many within the community. Le Shahidi Presse reported that Ruhigita had continued his religious duties and was still regarded as strong and active shortly before his death.

His colleague, Jules Kyembwa Walumona, attests that the outcomes of his lengthy leadership were overwhelmingly positive. His tenure witnessed the expansion of the community across numerous provinces, the construction of numerous durable Church buildings, the establishment of the Evangelical University in Africa, the Higher Institute of Theology, as well as numerous primary and secondary schools. Moreover, he spearheaded various development projects, including the creation of dispensaries and health centers. He notes:

"He did not hesitate to bang on the table, to get confused with the missionaries, to utter veiled or clear threats to them. Stubborn, he sometimes went against their decisions. Suffice it to recall here how he saved the Panzi domain by taking on a conflict with his fellow missionary Legal Representative who found the domain too large for a Church".

== Posthumous works ==
Ruhigita's only documented written work was his Kiswahili-language autobiography, Maisha Yangu Ruhigita Ndagora, published in 1993 shortly before his death. The book recounts his life and travels across Africa and Europe.

== Family ==
Ruhigita married Tabu Lema of the Ruteye family on 1 January 1954. The couple had eight children, three sons and five daughters. Their children were Neema Majagira (born 1957), Espoir Bulangaliire Majagira Ruhigita (born 1959), Marie Baholeze Majagira (born 1961), David Mibulano Majagira Ruhigita (born 1963), Gueron Majagira Ruhigita (born 1966), Nabintu Ruhigita (born 1967), Nakitami Ruhigita Gogo (born 1970), and Bigi Ruhigita (born 1973).
