= Suzanne Scholte =

American activist (born 1959)

Suzanne Scholte (born 1959 in Connecticut) is an American human rights activist. She is president of the Defense Forum Foundation and chair of the North Korea Freedom Coalition and Free North Korea Radio. She helped found the North Korea Freedom Coalition in 2003 to promote the freedom, human rights, and dignity of the North Korean people.

Her awards include the Seoul Peace Prize in 2008, the Walter Judd Freedom Award in 2010, the Order of Diplomatic Service Merit Sungnye Medal from the Republic of Korea in 2013, the Sanders Peace and Social Justice Award in 2014, and a Volunteer Service (Gold) Award from the President of the United States in 2014. She received the Manhae Prize for Practice in 2025. She was made an honorary citizen of Seoul in 2008.

== Activism ==
Scholte received the 2008 Seoul Peace Prize in recognition of her work promoting freedom and human rights for North Koreans and supporting Sahrawi refugees from Western Sahara. She also chairs the U.S.–Western Sahara Foundation, and co-chairs the Campaign to End the Occupation of the Western Sahara.

Scholte started her career as the youngest-ever chief-of-staff to a U.S. Member of Congress. Before focusing on human rights in North Korea, she organized Capitol Hill programs featuring defectors and dissidents from countries including the Soviet Union, Cuba, and China to raise awareness of human rights abuses.

In 2011, Scholte became involved in Operation Rising Eagle, a project to assist 15 North Koreans who had fled to China. Three children from the group reached the United States via Thailand in 2012, while three others resettled in South Korea. The remaining nine were deported from Laos to China and then repatriated to North Korea in May 2013. In an interview that month, Scholte called on the United States to expedite the admission of North Korean refugees, particularly children.

Through Free North Korea Radio, Scholte worked with a team of North Korean defectors led by Kim Seong-min to broadcast outside news and information into North Korea.

As chair of the North Korea Freedom Coalition, Scholte organizes the annual North Korea Freedom Week to promote the freedom, human rights, and dignity of the North Korean people. The event developed from North Korea Freedom Day, first held in 2004, and expanded into a week-long event in 2005. She also organizes Save North Korean Refugees Day, an annual international campaign calling for an end to China's forced repatriation of North Korean refugees.

== 2014 congressional campaign ==
In 2014, Scholte ran for the U.S. House of Representatives in Virginia's 11th congressional district. She won the Republican nomination at a convention on May 10, 2014, and lost to the Democratic incumbent Gerry Connolly in the November election.

== Personal life ==
Scholte graduated from the College of William & Mary in Williamsburg, Virginia. She received an honorary doctorate in education from Kosin University in Busan, South Korea, in 2008. She is married to Chadwick R. Gore and has three sons.

== See also ==
- Free North Korea Radio
- Human rights in North Korea
- Park Sang-hak
