= Kä Mana =

Congolese writer, professor, and theologian (1953–2021)

- Born: Godefroid Mana Kangudie; 3 November 1953; Dibaya, Belgian Congo (now Democratic Republic of the Congo)
- Died: 15 July 2021 (aged 67); Goma, Democratic Republic of the Congo
- Occupations: Writer; Professor; Theologian

Godefroid Mana Kangudie (3 November 1953 – 15 July 2021), widely known by his pen name Kä Mana, was a Congolese writer, professor, and theologian. Recognized as one of the Democratic Republic of the Congo (DRC)'s most prominent philosophers, he served as President of the POLE Institute, a research center focused on conflict resolution and social transformation in Central Africa.

Kä Mana specialized in ethics and the philosophy of peace, teaching at the Université Evangélique en Afrique (UEA) in Bukavu, DRC, and later at the Université Protestante d’Afrique Centrale (UPAC) in Cameroon. A prolific author, his works—including Changer la République Démocratique du Congo ("Transforming the Democratic Republic of Congo")—addressed themes of political reform, social justice, and Pan-African thought.

Committed to youth empowerment, Kä Mana emphasized education as a catalyst for societal change, advocating for programs to equip young Congolese with leadership and critical-thinking skills. His scholarship drew deeply from Congolese and African history, reflecting his alignment with contemporary African intellectuals such as Cheikh Anta Diop, Théophile Obenga, Achille Mbembe, and V. Y. Mudimbe, whose ideas he frequently cited.

Kä Mana died on 15 July 2021 in Goma, DRC, at age 67, from complications of COVID-19 during the global pandemic. His legacy endures through his extensive writings and influence on African philosophical discourse.

== Career ==
Kä Mana lectured and supervised research at multiple universities, including the Université Evangélique en Afrique (UEA) in Bukavu, where he mentored students such as Dr Amani Kasherwa. Born Godefroid Kangudie Tshibembe on 3 November 1953 in Congo-Kinshasa, he adopted the pen name Kä Mana, derived from the diminutive "Kä" and his first name "Mana."

A holder of a doctorate in philosophy from the Université Libre de Bruxelles (Belgium) and a doctorate in theology from the Université de Strasbourg (France), Kä Mana combined academic rigor with spiritual leadership. He served as a pastor in the Reformed African Church (ERAF) and later as a preacher in the Harrist Church (2005), bridging theological scholarship with grassroots community engagement.

Regarded as one of the DRC’s foremost philosophers and theologians, Kä Mana produced an extensive body of scholarly work. His career spanned interdisciplinary contributions to philosophy, theology, and African social thought, cementing his influence to Congolese academia.

== Biography ==
=== Leadership at POLE Institute ===
Kä Mana served as President of POLE Institute, an intercultural research organization focused on conflict resolution and social transformation in the Great Lakes region. His intellectual framework drew from African cultural traditions and liberation philosophy, critically analyzing the contributions and shortcomings of earlier schools of thought to shape his vision of societal reconstruction.

=== Intellectual Foundations ===
Rooted in African epistemologies, Kä Mana’s work emphasized the role of reason in reshaping socio-political life. A Lutheran pastor, he cautioned against the uncritical adoption of foreign religious frameworks in Africa, warning of "the warlike deviations of Christianity and Islam." His theology of reconstruction sought holistic human transformation, blending spiritual renewal with critiques of systemic crises.

=== Theology of Reconstruction ===
Kä Mana’s theological project aimed to dismantle Western intellectual dominance in African thought. He critiqued African intellectuals for remaining "trapped in Western paradigms," arguing that social crises in Africa stemmed from a "diseased imagination" and fragmented self-awareness. Key elements of his theology included:

- Mental de-alienation: Rejecting colonial and imported myths (e.g., "African identity," "democracy") as sterile constructs, he advocated reimagining them as catalysts for action.
- Reclaiming Pharaonic heritage: Inspired by V. Y. Mudimbe's concept of the "colonial library," he promoted rediscovering pre-colonial African histories to rebuild a self-determined future.
- Epistemic critique: He urged African scholars to develop tools to analyze systemic failures, stating:

"The new Christ to be invented [...] must be a breath of lucidity [...] to break free from established religious systems and address non-religious challenges."

=== Political Analysis ===
Kä Mana was an outspoken political commentator. On the 61st anniversary of the DRC's independence (30 June 2021), he remarked:

"61 years later, there is economic progress but immense challenges. Congolese must build an economy of shared prosperity [...] Without this awareness, independence remains meaningless for Africa."

=== Death ===
Kä Mana died on 15 July 2021 in Goma, DRC, at age 67, from complications of COVID-19.

== Bibliography ==
Kä Mana’s major works include:

- L'Expérience poétique de la transcendance (1987)
- Destinée négro-africaine (1987)
- L'Afrique va-t-elle mourir ? (1993)
- Théologie africaine pour un temps de crise (1993)
- Christ d'Afrique (1994)
- Chrétiens et Églises d'Afrique (1999)
- La nouvelle évangélisation en Afrique (2000)
- La mission de l'Église africaine (2005)
- Pour l'éducation politique des jeunes (2013)
- L'heure de l'économie éthique : les jeunes africains à la recherche du sens économique (2014)
- (RE) Découvrir les mythes : développer le pouvoir créateur des sociétés africains (2014)
- Cahier d'éducation à la transformation sociale (2015)
- Pour sortir de la guerre à l'est de la République démocratique du Congo (2016)
- Les vrais enjeux de la renaissance africaine (2017)
