= DRC Mapping Exercise Report =

UN report on human rights violations in the DRC

The DRC Mapping Exercise Report, or the Democratic Republic of the Congo 1993-2003 UN Mapping Report, was a report by the United Nations within the Democratic Republic of the Congo in the wake of the armed aggressions and war which took place between March 1993 and June 2003. Its aim was to map the most serious violations of human rights, together with violations of international humanitarian law, committed within the Democratic Republic of the Congo. In doing this it was to assess the capacities within the national justice system to deal appropriately with such human rights violations and to formulate a series of options aimed at assisting the government of the Democratic Republic of the Congo in identifying appropriate transitional justice mechanisms to deal with the legacy of these violations. It contained 550 pages and contained descriptions of 617 alleged violent incidents.

The mapping exercise began in 2008, with 33 staff working on the project in the Democratic Republic of the Congo, including Congolese and international human rights experts. The report was submitted to the High Commissioner for Human Rights Navi Pillay in 2009.

The report contains a detailed accounting of the breakup of Hutu refugee camps in eastern Congo at the start of the First Congo War in October 1996, followed by the pursuit of hundreds of thousands of Hutu refugees and Hutu population across the country's vast hinterland by teams of Rwanda, Burundi and Uganda soldiers and their Congolese rebel surrogates, the Alliance of Democratic Forces for the Liberation of Congo.

== Context ==
In the wake of the discovery of three mass graves in the eastern part of the Democratic Republic of the Congo (DRC) in late 2005, the United Nations first announced its intention to send a human rights team to conduct a mapping exercise in DRC in a June 2006 report to the Security Council. In May 2007, UN Secretary-General Ban Ki-moon approved the terms of reference of the mapping exercise following a series of consultations among relevant UN agencies and partners and with the Congolese government.

The mapping exercise began officially on 17 July 2008, with the arrival of the team's chief in Kinshasa. Between October 2008 and May 2009, a total of 33 staff worked on the project in the DRC, including Congolese and international human rights experts. Of these, some 20 human rights officers were deployed across the country, operating out of five field offices, to gather documents and information from witnesses to meet the three objectives defined in the terms of reference. The report was submitted to the High Commissioner for Human Rights Navi Pillay on 15 June 2009 for review, comments and finalisation.

== Research methodology ==
The mapping team's 550-page report contains descriptions of 617 alleged violent incidents occurring in the DRC between March 1993 and June 2003. Each of these incidents points to the possible commission of gross violations of human rights and/or international humanitarian law. Each of the incidents listed is backed up by at least two independent sources identified in the report. As serious as they may be, uncorroborated incidents claimed by one single source are not included. Over 1,500 documents relating to human rights violations committed during this period were gathered and analysed with a view to establishing an initial chronology by region of the main violent incidents reported. Only incidents meeting a 'gravity threshold' set out in the methodology were considered. Field mapping teams met with over 1,280 witnesses to corroborate or invalidate the violations listed in the chronology. Information was also collected on previously undocumented crimes.

The 1,500 documents reviewed, some of them confidential, were obtained from many sources, including the United Nations, the Congolese government, Congolese and major international human rights organisations, national and international media and various unions, religious groups, aid agencies and victims’ associations. Lastly, various sources, individuals and experts, national and international, were also consulted to open up new avenues of research, corroborate information and streamline the overall analysis.

== Mandate and Objectives ==
The report states that the mapping team “was not concerned with pursuing in-depth investigations or gathering evidence of sufficient admissibility to stand in court” but rather with “providing the basis for the formulation of initial hypothesis of investigation by giving a sense of the scale of violations, detecting patterns and identifying potential leads or sources of evidence”.

The mapping exercise, led by the Office of the UN High Commissioner for Human Rights (OHCHR) with some US$3 million in funding, had three objectives:

- Conduct a mapping exercise of the most serious violations of human rights and international humanitarian law committed within the territory of the DRC between March 1993 and June 2003.
- Assess the existing capacities within the national justice system to deal appropriately with such human rights violations that may be uncovered.
- Formulate a series of options aimed at assisting the Government of the DRC in identifying appropriate transitional justice mechanisms to deal with the legacy of these violations, in terms of truth, justice, reparation and reform, taking into account ongoing efforts by the DRC authorities, as well as the support of the international community.

Unlike some commissions of inquiry with a specific mandate to identify the perpetrators of violations and make them accountable for their actions, the objective of the Mapping Exercise was not to establish or to try to establish individual criminal responsibility. Instead, its aim was to expose in a transparent way the seriousness of the violations committed, with the aim of encouraging an approach aimed at breaking the cycle of impunity. The report does, however, identify the armed groups to which the alleged perpetrators belonged, since it was essential to identify the groups allegedly involved in order to suggest proper legal characterisations for the conduct in question. Consequently, information on the identity of the alleged perpetrators of some of the crimes listed does not appear in the report but is held in a confidential project database submitted to the UN High Commissioner for Human Rights. However, the identities of alleged perpetrators under warrant of arrest and those already sentenced for crimes listed in the report have been disclosed. Names have also been cited where political officials have assumed public positions encouraging or provoking the violations listed.

== Period covered ==
The report is presented chronologically, reflecting four key periods in the DRC's recent history:

- March 1993–June 1996: The first period covers violations committed in the final years of the regime of President Mobutu Sese Seko and is marked by the failure of the democratisation process and the devastating consequences of the Rwandan genocide on the declining Zairian state, in particular in the provinces of North Kivu and South Kivu. During this period, 40 incidents were listed.
- July 1996–July 1998: The second period concerns violations committed during the First Congo War and the first year of the regime established by President Laurent-Désiré Kabila. This period has the greatest number of listed incidents (238) in the whole of the decade under examination.
- August 1998–January 2000: The third period concerns the inventory of violations committed between the start of the Second Congo War in August 1998, and the death of President Kabila. This period includes 200 incidents and is characterised by the intervention on the territory of the DRC of the government armed forces of several countries.
- January 2001–June 2003: The final period lists 139 incidents of violations committed in spite of the gradual establishment of a ceasefire along the front line and the speeding up of peace negotiations in preparation for the start of the transition period on 30 June 2003. (16–21)

== Report recommendations ==
=== Justice ===
The UN Mapping Report recommended the creation of a mixed judicial mechanism made up of national and international personnel as one of various transitional justice measures to be considered to address the numerous international crimes committed in the DRC. It did not make firm proposals on the national or international character of such mechanism, or its precise form or function.

The operating methods and exact form of such a court “should be decided on and specified in detail by consulting the actors concerned, as well as the victims affected...” A mechanism of this kind should also – among many other things – apply international criminal law in relation to international crimes, including “the responsibility of superiors for the acts committed by their subordinates;” it should “exclude the jurisdiction of the military courts in this area;” and should “have jurisdiction over anyone who has committed these crimes, whether they are nationals or non-nationals, civilians or military personnel.” (Paragraph 1052 / 1054)

=== Truth-seeking and reparations ===
Declaring that the Congolese people have a “right to the truth on all the serious violations of human rights,” the report suggests the establishment of a new, non-judicial “truth commission” that can help to determine institutional, political, military and other responsibilities; preserve evidence; identify the perpetrators of atrocities; recommend compensation measures and institutional reforms; and provide individual victims with a broader platform in which to air their grievances and concerns. (Paragraph 1057 / 1060–1061).

Given the huge number of victims, the report says a comprehensive and creative approach to the issue of reparation is clearly required, and notes that the Congolese government should be the first to contribute. But it also points to the responsibilities of other countries involved in the conflict and notes that individuals and corporate entities such as multinationals which exploited the DRC's natural resources during the conflict could also be ordered to pay compensation if found criminally responsible. (Paragraph 1074-75)

=== Crime of genocide ===
The report notes, “it is important that a full judicial investigation take place, in order to shed light on the reported incidents” in 1996–97. “Only such an investigation and judicial determination would be in a position to resolve whether these incidents amount to the crime of genocide.” (Paragraph 522)

The mapping report team noted that “The question of whether the numerous serious acts of violence committed against the Hutus (refugees and others) constitute crimes of genocide has attracted a significant degree of comment and to date remains unresolved. The report repeatedly stresses that this question can “only be decided by a court decision on the basis of evidence beyond all reasonable doubt. However, "the apparent systematic and widespread attacks described in this report reveal a number of inculpatory elements that, if proven before a competent court, could be characterised as crimes of genocide."

Certain elements could cause a court to hesitate to decide on the existence of a genocidal plan, such as the fact that as of 15 November 1996, several tens of thousands of Rwandan Hutu refugees, many of whom had survived previous attacks, were repatriated to Rwanda with the help of the AFDL/APR authorities and that hundreds of thousands of Rwandan Hutu refugees were able to return to Rwanda with the consent of the Rwandan authorities prior to the start of the first war. Whilst, in general, the killings did not spare women and children, in some places, at the beginning of the first war, Hutu women and children were in fact separated from the men, and only the men were subsequently killed.

== Leaked draft report ==
An earlier draft of the report was leaked by French newspaper Le Monde on 27 August, creating intense controversies as it reported that several Congolese rebel groups, Ugandan troops (along with Burundian, Angolan and other armed groups) had committed grave human rights violations. The most contentious aspect of the report referred to the possibility that the armed forces of Rwanda and their local allies may have committed acts, which could constitute crimes of genocide against ethnic Hutu civilians fleeing the country in fear of reprisal. There was concern in the United Nations that Rwanda might end its participation in peacekeeping operations in reaction to the official release for the report. The authors of the report indicated that they were concerned that the language of “genocide” may be watered down before the official publishing of the document, therefore they felt it necessary to leak the report to safeguard the integrity of the report.

== Report key findings ==
The apparently systematic nature of these violations suggests that the numerous deaths cannot be attributed to the hazards of both first and second Congo wars or seen as equating to collateral damage. The majority of the victims were children, women, elderly people and the sick, who posed no threat to the attacking forces. Numerous serious attacks on the physical or psychological integrity of members of the group were also committed, with a very high number of Hutus shot, raped, burnt or beaten. Very large numbers of victims were forced to flee and travel long distances to escape their pursuers, who were trying to kill them. The hunt lasted for months, resulting in the deaths of an unknown number of people subjected to cruel, inhuman and degrading living conditions, without access to food or medication. On several occasions, the humanitarian aid intended for them was deliberately blocked, in particular in Orientale Province, depriving them of assistance essential to their survival.

Here are some of the draft report's key findings:.

Paragraph 512. The systematic attacks, in particular killings and massacres perpetrated against members of the Hutu ethnic group, are described extensively in section I of the report. These attacks resulted in a very large number of victims, probably tens of thousands of members of the Hutu ethnic group, all nationalities combined. In the vast majority of case reported, it was not a question of people killed unintentionally in the course of combat, but people targeted primarily by AFDL [Congolese rebels led by Laurent Kabila, who became president in 1997]/APR [Rwandan army]/FAB [Burundi's army] forces and executed in their hundreds, often with edged weapons.

Paragraph 513. At the time of the incidents covered by this report, the Hutu population in Zaire, including refugees from Rwanda, constituted an ethnic group as defined in the Convention on the Prevention and Punishment of the Crime of Genocide. Moreover, as shown previously, the intention to destroy a group in part is sufficient to be classified as a crime of genocide. Finally, the courts have also confirmed that the destruction of a group can be limited to a particular geographical area. It is therefore possible to assert that, even if only a part of the Hutu population in Zaire was targeted and destroyed, it could nonetheless constitute a crime of genocide, if this was the intention of the perpetrators. Finally, several incidents listed also seem to confirm that the numerous attacks were targeted at members of the Hutu ethnic group as such.

Although, at certain times, the aggressors said they were looking for the criminals responsible for the genocide committed against the Tutsis in Rwanda in 1994, the majority of the incidents reported indicate that the Hutus were targeted as such, with no discrimination between them. The numerous attacks against the Hutus in Zaire, who were not part of the refugees, seem to confirm that it was all Hutus, as such, who were targeted. The crimes committed in particular in Rutshuru (30 October 1996) and Mugogo (18 November 1996), in North Kivu, highlight the specific targeting of the Hutus, since people who were able to persuade the aggressors that they belonged to another ethnic group were released just before the massacres. The systematic use of barriers by the AFDL/APR/FAB, particularly in South Kivu, enabled them to identify people of Hutu origin by their name or village of origin and thus to eliminate them. Hundreds of people of Hutu origin are thus thought to have been arrested at a barrier erected in November 1996 in Ngwenda, in the Rutshuru territory, and subsequently executed by being beaten with sticks in a place called Kabaraza. In South Kivu, AFDL/APR/FAB soldiers erected numerous barriers on the Ruzizi plain to stop Rwandan and Burundian refugees who had been dispersed after their camps had been dismantled.

Paragraph 514: Several incidents listed in this report point to circumstances and facts from which a court could infer the intention to destroy the Hutu ethnic group in the DRC in part, if these were established beyond all reasonable doubt. Firstly, the scale of the crimes and the large number of victims are illustrated by the numerous incidents described above. The extensive use of edged weapons (primarily hammers) and the systematic massacre of survivors, including women and children, after the camps had been taken show that the numerous deaths cannot be attributed to the hazards of war or seen as equating to collateral damage. The systematic nature of the attacks listed against the Hutus also emerges: These attacks took place in each location where refugees had been identified by the AFDL/APR, over a vast area of the country. Particularly in North Kivu and South Kivu but also in other provinces, the massacres often began with a trick by elements of the AFDL/APR, who summoned the victims to meetings on the pretext either of discussing their repatriation to Rwanda in the case of the refugees, or of introducing them to the new authorities in the case of Hutus settled in the region, or of distributing food.

Afterwards, those present were systematically killed. Cases of this kind were confirmed in the province of North Kivu in Musekera, Rutshuru and Kiringa (October 1996), Mugogo and Kabaraza (November 1996), Hombo, Katoyi, Kausa, Kifuruka, Kinigi, Musenge, Mutiko and Nyakariba (December 1996), Kibumba and Kabizo (April 1997) and Mushangwe (around August 1997); in the province of South Kivu in Rushima and Luberizi (October 1996), Cotonco and Chimanga (November 1996) and Mpwe (February 1997) and on the Shabunda-Kigulube road (February–April 1997); in Orientale Province in Kisangani and Bengamisa (May and June 1997); in Maniema in Kalima (March 1997) and in Équateur in Boende (April 1997). Such acts certainly suggest premeditation and a precise methodology. In the region south of the town of Walikale, in North Kivu (January 1997), Rwandan Hutus were subjected to daily killings in areas already under the control of the AFDL/APR as part of a campaign that seemed to target any Hutus living in the area in question.

Paragraph 515: Several of the massacres listed were committed regardless of the age or gender of the victims. This is particularly true of the crimes committed in Kibumba (October 1996), Mugunga and Osso (November 1996), Hombo and Biriko (December 1996) in the province of North Kivu, Kashusha and Shanje (November 1996) in the province of South Kivu, Tingi-Tingi and Lubutu (March 1997) in Maniema Province, and Boende (April 1997) in Equateur Province, where the vast majority of victims were women and children. Furthermore, no effort was made to make a distinction between Hutus who were members of the ex-FAR/Interahamwe [militia behind Rwanda's 1994 genocide] and Hutu civilians, whether or not they were refugees.

This tendency to put all Hutus together and "tar them with the same brush" is also illustrated by the declarations made during the "awareness-raising speeches" made by the AFDL/APR in certain places, according to which any Hutu still present in Zaire must necessarily be a perpetrator of genocide, since the "real" refugees had already returned to Rwanda. These "awareness-raising speeches" made in North Kivu also incited the population to look for, kill or help to kill Rwandan Hutu refugees, whom they called "pigs". This type of language would have been in widespread use during the operations in this region.

Paragraph 516: The massacres in Mbandaka and Wendji, committed on 13 May 1997 in Équateur Province, over 2,000 kilometres west of Rwanda, were the final stage in the hunt for Hutu refugees that had begun in eastern Zaire, in North and South Kivu, in October 1996. Among the refugees were elements of the ex-FAR/Interahamwe, who were disarmed by the local police force as soon as they arrived. In spite of everything, the AFDL/APR opened fire on hundreds of defenceless Hutu refugees, resulting in large numbers of victims.

Paragraph 517: The systematic and widespread attacks described in this report, which targeted very large numbers of Rwandan Hutu refugees and members of the Hutu civilian population, resulting in their death, reveal a number of damning elements that, if they were proven before a competent court, could be classified as crimes of genocide. The behaviour of certain elements of the AFDL/APR in respect of the Hutu refugees and Hutu populations settled in Zaire at this time seems to equate to "a manifest pattern of similar conduct directed against that group", from which a court could even deduce the existence of a genocidal plan. "Whilst the existence of such a plan may contribute to establishing the required genocidal intention, it is nonetheless only an element of proof used to deduce such an intention and not a legal element of genocide."

Paragraph 518. Nonetheless, neither the fact that only men were targeted during the massacres, nor the fact that part of the group were allowed to leave the country or that their movement was facilitated for various reasons, are sufficient in themselves to entirely remove the intention of certain people to partially destroy an ethnic group as such. In this respect it seems possible to infer a specific intention on the part of certain AFDL/APR commanders to partially destroy the Hutus in the DRC, and therefore to commit a crime of genocide, based on their conduct, words and the damning circumstances of the acts of violence committed by the men under their command. It will be for a court with proper jurisdiction to rule on this question.

Conclusion Paragraph 1139. In light of the impunity enjoyed by the perpetrators of serious violations of human rights and international humanitarian law, and the repetition of crimes within the territory of the DRC, there is a manifest urgency for justice and security service reform. The members of the Mapping Team were able to observe the constant fear on the part of affected populations that history would repeat itself, especially when yesterday's attackers are returning in positions that enable them to commit new crimes with complete impunity.

== Reactions ==
The Government of Rwanda stated that “The Draft Mapping Report addresses only a fraction of a complex history, and ignores publicly available information that seriously undermines its findings. The reader is left with a onedsided account, and provided no context with which to understand who each of these Rwandan actors were, and how they found themselves in the Congolese forests from 1994 to 2003". The office of the government of Rwanda, in its press statement found that “It is immoral and unacceptable that the United Nations, an organization that failed outright to prevent genocide in Rwanda and the subsequent refugees crisis, a direct cause for so much suffering in Congo and Rwanda, now accuses the army that stopped the genocide of committing atrocities in the Democratic Republic of Congo.” “It is a fact that Rwanda’s intervention in the D.R.C. was a matter of survival and the direct consequence of the irresponsible and insensitive management of the refugee camps by the U.N. and the international community subsequent to the genocide."

Ugandan government rejected the report as a compendium of rumors deeply flawed in methodology, sourcing and standard of proof. "Its timing, scope, motive and subsequent leakage to the media were all made in bad taste."

== See also ==
- First Congo War
- Second Congo War
- Gersony Report
- Great Lakes refugee crisis
