= Korean Mongolian =

Korean Mongolian or Mongolian Korean may refer to:

- Mongol invasions of Korea, 1231–1270, a series of campaigns by the Mongol Empire against the Kingdom of Goryeo
- North Korea-Mongolia relations, the historic and current bilateral relations between Mongolia and North Korea
- South Korea-Mongolia relations, foreign relations between South Korea and the Mongolia
- Koreans in Mongolia, one of the Korean diaspora communities in Asia
- Mongolians in South Korea, the world's largest population of Mongolian citizens abroad
- Multiethnic people of mixed Korean and Mongolian descent
