= Mongolian South Korean =

Mongolian South Korean or South Korean Mongolian may refer to:

- Mongolians in South Korea
- South Koreans in Mongolia
- Mongolia-South Korea relations
- Mixed race people of Mongolian and South Korean descent

== See also ==
- Mongol invasions of Korea
