= Soviet Koreans =

Soviet Koreans may refer to:

- Koryo-saram, the descendants of 19th-century Korean immigrants to the Russian Far East
- North Koreans in Russia
  - Koreans in Kamchatka, North Korean workers who migrated after World War II, and their descendants
- Sakhalin Koreans, Korean subjects of the Japanese Empire who remained in the Soviet Union after World War II
- The ethnic Koreans born in Russia who were a faction of the Workers' Party of North Korea
