= Mongolian Chinese (disambiguation) =

Mongolian Chinese usually refer to ethnic Mongols in China.

Mongolian Chinese might also refer to:

- Mongolians in Taiwan (Republic of China)
- Mixed race people of Han Chinese and Mongol descent

== See also ==
- Chinese Mongolian, also known as ethnic Chinese in Mongolia
