= North Korean defectors =

People fleeing North Korea

- Hangul: 탈북자; 탈북민
- Hanja: 脫北者; 脫北民
- RR: talbukja; talbungmin
- MR: t'albukcha; t'albungmin

Number of North Korean defectors per year
| Year | Population |
|---|---|
| 1998 | 947 |
| 2001 | 1,043 |
| 2002 | 1,142 |
| 2003 | 1,285 |
| 2004 | 1,898 |
| 2005 | 1,384 |
| 2006 | 2,028 |
| 2007 | 2,554 |
| 2008 | 2,803 |
| 2009 | 2,914 |
| 2010 | 2,402 |
| 2011 | 2,706 |
| 2012 | 1,502 |
| 2013 | 1,514 |
| 2014 | 1,397 |
| 2015 | 1,275 |
| 2016 | 1,418 |
| 2017 | 1,127 |
| 2018 | 1,137 |
| 2019 | 1,047 |
| 2020 | 229 |
| 2021 | 63 |
| 2022 | 67 |
| 2023 | 196 |
| 2024 | 236 |
| 2025 | 223 |

People defect from North Korea for political, material, safety and personal reasons. Defectors flee to various countries, mainly South Korea. In South Korea, they are referred to by several terms, including "northern refugees" and "new settlers".

Towards the end of the North Korean famine of the 1990s, there was a steep increase in defections, eventually peaking in 2009. Since then, some of the main reasons for the falling number of defectors have been strict border patrols and inspections, forced deportations, the costs of defection, and the end of the mass famine that swept the country when Soviet aid ceased with the dissolution of the Soviet Union. The number of defectors has plummeted during the 2020s. The most common strategy for defectors is to cross the China–North Korea border into the Chinese provinces of Jilin or Liaoning. About 76% to 84% of defectors interviewed in China or South Korea came from the North Korean provinces bordering China.

From China, defectors usually flee to a third country, due to China being a relatively close ally of North Korea. China is the most influential of North Korea's few economic partners, with the latter's situation as the target of decades of UN sanctions. China is also a continuous source of aid to North Korea. To avoid worsening the already tense relations with the Korean Peninsula, China refuses to grant North Korean defectors refugee status and considers them illegal economic migrants. Defectors caught in China are repatriated back to North Korea, where human rights groups say they often face torture, wrongful imprisonment, sexual violence, forced labor, and possible execution. Some defectors voluntarily return to North Korea.

== Terms ==
Different terms, official and unofficial, refer to North Korean refugees. One such term in South Korea is "northern refugees" (탈북자; talbukja; t'albukcha or 탈북민; talbungmin; t'albungmin).

On 9 January 2005, the South Korean Ministry of Unification announced the use of saeteomin (새터민, "people of new land") instead of talbukja (탈북자, "people who fled the North"), a term about which North Korean officials expressed displeasure. A newer term is bukhanitaljumin (북한 이탈 주민; 北韓離脫住民), which has the more forceful meaning of "residents who renounced North Korea".

North Korean scholar Andrei Lankov has criticized the term "defectors", as most who flee North Korea are not political dissidents seeking asylum, but are instead primarily motivated by a desire to escape poverty.

In 2025, the South Korean government considered using the new expression bukhyangmin (북향민, 北鄕民), meaning "people whose hometowns are in the north", as the previous designation talbukmin was considered to have negative connotations. However, due to the difference in a homophonic Hanja (Chinese character), this expression could also be misinterpreted as "people heading northward" (北向民), i.e. someone who identifies with North Korean ideology.

In March 2026, the Ministry of Unification of South Korea officially adopted "North Korean-born citizens" as the formal English translation for North Korean defectors.

== Settlement process ==
North Korean defectors must first enter the North Korean Refugee Protection Center, run by the National Intelligence Service, for interrogation for about 90 days when they leave North Korea and enter South Korea. The interrogation process is conducted in conjunction with the National Intelligence Service, the Ministry of Unification, the National Police Agency, and the Committee for the Five Northern Korean Provinces, necessary to check whether they are spies sent by the North Korean regime or ethnic Koreans disguised as North Korean defectors. Only if North Korean defectors pass the interrogation successfully will they be admitted to Hanawon operated by the Ministry of Unification and trained to adapt to South Korean society.

== Demographics ==
According to Courtland Robinson, assistant professor at the Center for Refugee and Disaster Response at the Johns Hopkins Bloomberg School of Public Health, around 10,000 North Korean defectors are staying in China. 1,418 were registered as arriving in South Korea in 2016. In 2017, there were 31,093 defectors registered with the Unification Ministry in South Korea, 71% of whom were women. In 2018, the numbers had been dramatically dropping since Kim Jong Un took power in 2011, trending towards less than a thousand per year, down from the peak of 2,914 in 2009.

Robinson estimated that in the past the total number of 6,824 and 7,829 children were born to North Korean women in the three Northeastern Provinces of China. Recently, survey results conducted in 2013 by Johns Hopkins and the Korea Institute for National Unification (KINU) showed that there were about 8,708 North Korean defectors and 15,675 North Korean children in China's same three Northeastern Provinces which are Jilin, Liaoning and Yanbian Korean Autonomous Prefecture.

Most North Korean refugees reportedly leave the country due to economic reasons. Based on a study of North Korean defectors, women make up the majority of defections. In 2002, they comprised 56% of defections to South Korea (1,138 people), and by 2011, the number had grown to 71% (2,706 people). More women leave the North because they are more likely to suffer financial hardships. This is due to the prevalence of women in service sector jobs whereas men are employed in the military. According to South Korean government data, 45% of defectors cited economic reasons for defecting. According to NK News, men had a higher tendency to leave the country due to political, ideological or surveillance pressure. During the first half of 2018, 88% of defectors to the South were women.

== Migration ==
=== Paths of migration ===
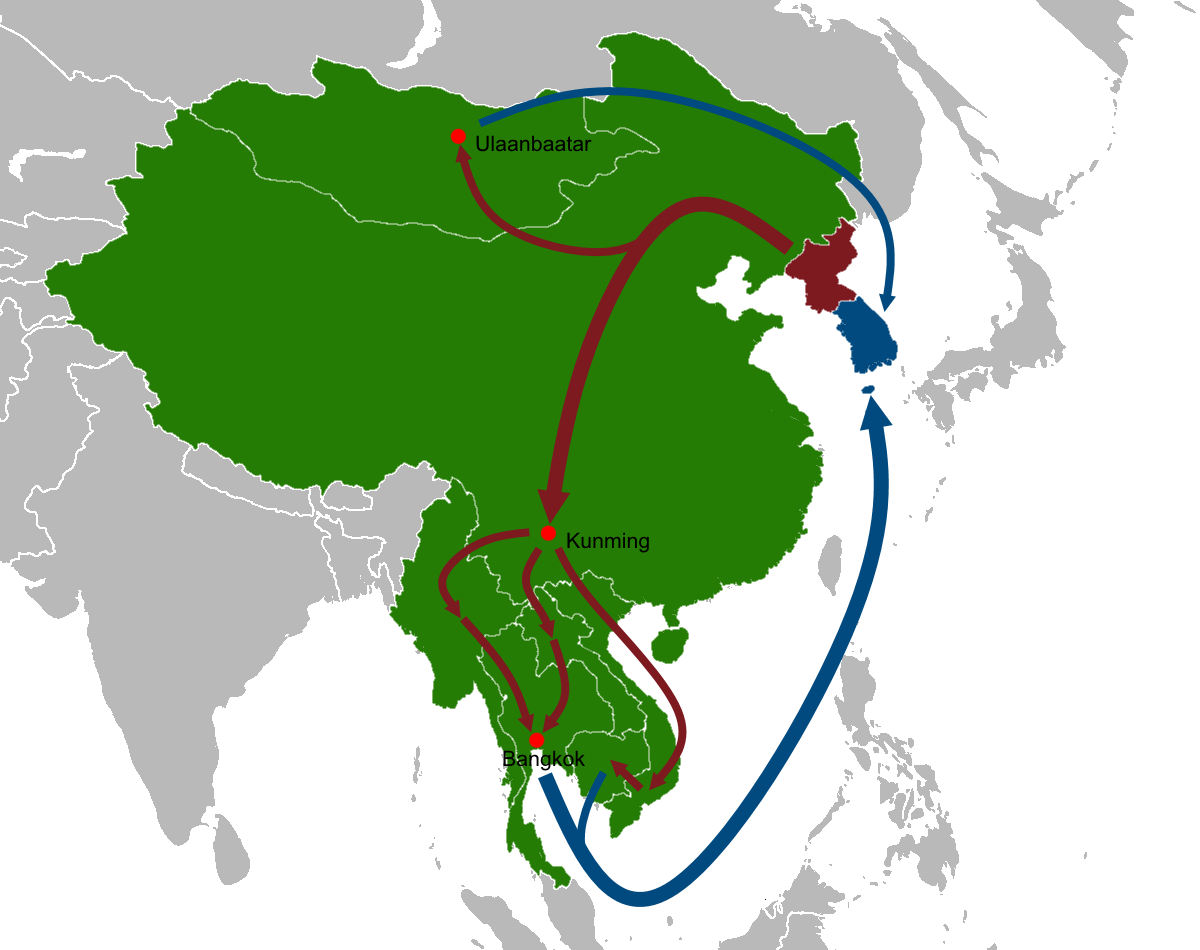
Possible paths of North Korean defectors

For most North Koreans, there are no safe options for leaving the country. Regardless of which path is taken, United States special envoy for North Korean Human Rights Issues Robert R. King asserts that there is danger and risk associated with tremendous repercussions for being caught. The border to the south, shared with South Korea, is heavily guarded and militarized with constant lookouts, millions of landmines, and thousands of soldiers on both sides of the border itself. The 10 miles (16 km) northern border shared with Russia is also constantly patrolled and the Russian soldiers immediately turn any defectors over to the North Korean government. Leaving by water is just as difficult with the guards along the coasts, limited access to boats, and sea patrols to catch anyone who may get through the first defense measures. The only other option is through the Chinese border. In comparison it is safe, but it is still very risky and difficult.

=== Effects of COVID-19 ===
The COVID-19 pandemic caused the North Korean-Chinese border to be significantly more closed and difficult to pass through. This has caused refugees entering South Korea to significantly drop. This gives an idea of why migration of North Koreans to the States has slowed significantly, along with the factors previously discussed.

=== Gender in migration ===
There is a disproportionate number of women who escape North Korea due to human trafficking across the North Korean-Chinese border. A 2020 study found that due to food shortages in North Korea, women have been going further out to obtain food. "The moment they cross the border — and sometimes when they are still in North Korea — refugee women are tapped by marriage brokers and pimps involved in human trafficking." The preference for male babies in China, especially in rural areas, led to a disproportionate number of males, leading to a need for more marriage-age women. These women are trafficked across the border and sold to Chinese men. This, however, has caused significant mental health issues for these refugees and often prevents them from escaping to safer areas.

== By destination ==
=== South Korea ===
South Korea's Ministry of Unification is a government organization that is in charge of preparing for a future reunification between North and South Korea. It is responsible for north–south relations including economic trade, diplomacy, and communication, and education of reunification, which involves spreading awareness in schools and among the public sphere. The Ministry of Unification is thus the main organization that manages North Korean defectors in South Korean territory by establishing admission processes and resettlement policies. It also has regional sub-organs called Hana Centers that help defectors in their day-to-day life for a more smooth transition into South Korean society. According to the Ministry of Unification, the cumulative number of North Korean defectors who have resettled in South Korea reached 34,538 as of the end of 2025. Military defections across the heavily fortified demilitarized zone (DMZ) are few in number, with only 20 defectors since 1996.

Under the South Korean Constitution, North Korea is viewed as an illegal occupier of the Korean peninsula. As such, under South Korean law, all North Koreans are citizens of the Republic of Korea, so they are granted citizenship status almost immediately upon entering the country. This causes issues for North Korean refugees hoping to gain refugee or asylum status in the United States. Their citizenship status in South Korea blocked them from receiving immigration status, until 2004 in the United States, because they were considered to be resettled and no longer qualified for refugee status.

==== Reward ====
In 1962, the government of South Korea introduced the "Special law on the protection of defectors from the North" which, after revision in 1978, remained effective until 1993. According to the law, every defector was eligible for an aid package. After their arrival in the South, defectors would receive an allowance. The size of this allowance depended on which of three categories the particular defector belonged. The category was determined by the defector's political and intelligence value. Apart from this allowance, defectors who delivered especially valuable intelligence or equipment were given large additional rewards. Prior to 1997 the payments had been fixed in gold bullion, not in South Korean won—in attempts to counter ingrained distrust about the reliability of paper money.

In 2004, South Korea passed controversial new measures intended to slow the flow of asylum seekers because of concern that a growing number of North Koreans crossing the Amnok and Duman rivers into China would soon seek refuge in the South. The regulations tighten defector screening processes and slash the amount of money given to each refugee from ₩28,000,000 ($24,180) to ₩10,000,000 ($8,636). South Korean officials say the new rules are intended to prevent ethnic Koreans living in China from entering the South, as well as to stop North Koreans with criminal records from gaining entry.

As of 2006, the state provided some defectors with apartments, and all those who wished to study were granted the right to enter a university of their choice. For a period of time after their arrival, defectors were also provided with personal bodyguards.

By 2015, the South Korean government paid interview fees to defectors ranging from $50 to $500 per hour depending on the quality of the information provided.

In 2016, defectors past retirement age received Basic Livelihood Benefits of about ₩450,000 ($390) per month, which covered basic necessities, but left them amongst the poorest of retirees.

In 2017, the South Korean government increased to $860,000 the reward it pays to defectors who provide information that helps South Korean security interests. Those who defect with weapons are entitled to other amounts.

In 2021, the Ministry of Unification described the support package for defectors as:

- 12 weeks of adaptation training
- $6,000 to $32,400 of settlement benefits, depending on size of household
- $13,300 to $19,100 housing subsidy
- Free education in public schools and universities

==== Resettlement ====
According to the Ministry of Unification, over 33,000 North Korean refugees were living in South Korea in 2019. North Korean refugees arriving in the South first face joint interrogation by authorities having jurisdiction including the National Intelligence Service and the National Police Agency to ensure that they are not spies. They are then sent to Hanawon, a government resettlement center where they are provided a 12-week social adaptation mandatory course, mainly focused on economic and political education, as well as job training. After three months of resettlement training, the government provides assistance in residence, employment, and health insurance. However, apart from these essential trainings for social adaptation, psychological needs such as mitigating traumatic experiences and vulnerable mental health statuses are not significantly addressed.

There are also non-profit and non-governmental organizations that seek to make the socio-cultural transition easier and more efficient for the refugees. One such organization, Saejowi, provides defectors with medical assistance as well as an education in diverse topics ranging from leadership and counseling techniques to sexual violence prevention and avoidance. Another organization, PSCORE, runs education programs for refugees, providing weekly English classes and one-on-one tutoring.

Children can attend local South Korean schools or specific schools for North Korean refugee children. At local South Korean schools, they may suffer discrimination and cruelty from other children. The refugee schools do not prepare them well for South Korean society. North Korean students generally fall behind South Korean peers academically. Until up to age 35, they can go to college without paying any fees.

In 2021, 56% of defectors had a low income. Nearly 25% were in the lowest income bracket so they were given national basic livelihood subsidies, which are six times the proportion in the general South Korean population.

==== Statistics ====
Status of North Korean defectors entering South Korea
| Criteria / Year | ~1998 | ~2001 | 2002 | 2003 | 2004 | 2005 | 2006 | 2007 | 2008 | 2009 | 2010 | 2011 | 2012 | 2013 | 2014 | 2015 | 2016 | 2017 | 2018 | 2019 | 2020 | 2021 | 2022 | 2023 | Total |
|---|---|---|---|---|---|---|---|---|---|---|---|---|---|---|---|---|---|---|---|---|---|---|---|---|---|
| Male | 831 | 565 | 510 | 474 | 626 | 424 | 515 | 573 | 608 | 662 | 591 | 795 | 404 | 369 | 305 | 251 | 299 | 188 | 168 | 202 | 72 | 40 | 35 | 32 | 9,533 |
| Female | 116 | 478 | 632 | 811 | 1,272 | 960 | 1,513 | 1,981 | 2,195 | 2,252 | 1,811 | 1,911 | 1,098 | 1,145 | 1,092 | 1,024 | 1,119 | 939 | 969 | 845 | 157 | 23 | 32 | 164 | 24,448 |
| Total | 947 | 1,043 | 1,142 | 1,285 | 1,898 | 1,384 | 2,028 | 2,554 | 2,803 | 2,914 | 2,402 | 2,706 | 1,502 | 1,514 | 1,397 | 1,275 | 1,418 | 1,127 | 1,137 | 1,047 | 229 | 63 | 67 | 196 | 34,021 |

Results of a survey conducted by the North Korean Refugees Foundation show that approximately 71% of North Koreans to have defected to South Korea since about 1998 are female. The percentage of female defectors has risen from 56% in 2002 to a high of 85% in 2018.

As of February 2014, age demographic of North Korean defectors show that 4% were ages 0–9, 12% were ages 10–19, 58% were ages 20–39, 21% were ages 40–59, and 4% were over 60. More than 50% of defectors come from North Hamgyong Province.

The employment status of defectors before leaving North Korea was 2% held administrative jobs, 3% were soldiers (all able-bodied persons are required to serve 7–10 years in the military), 38% were "workers", 48% were unemployed or being supported by someone else, 4% were "service", 1% worked in arts or sports, and 2% worked as "professionals".

==== Discrimination ====
According to a poll by the National Human Rights Commission of Korea, around 50% of defectors said they had experienced discrimination because of their background. The two major issues were their inability to afford medical care and poor working conditions. Many complained of disrespectful treatment by journalists. According to the World Institute for North Korea Studies, a young female defector who does not attend a university has little chance of making a living in the South.

==== Mental health ====
North Korean refugees who resettle in South Korea have been exposed to various forms of traumatic experiences in their home country before migration. 49–81% of adult North Korean refugees have reported experiencing or witnessing at least one type of traumatic event, directly and/or indirectly. These events include witnessing public executions, starvation, torture, and being sent to a correctional facility. Moreover, during migration, they are subjected to additional trauma through multiple relocations before arriving in South Korea. Once resettled, many experience acculturation stress that includes homesickness, cultural shock, alienation, perceived discrimination, and feelings of marginalization. As a consequence, in a survey of over 24,000 of North Koreans who migrated to South Korea between August and December 2012, 607 identified as suffering from depression, anxiety, or suicidal ideation. Moreover, North Korean refugees exhibit post-traumatic stress disorder symptoms which are not significantly addressed through governmental agencies. A study of 182 defectors has shown that, due to mutual mistrust between North and South Koreans, defectors are often unable to receive medical help. With limited government-sponsored programs for migrants, North Koreans face vocational, medical, and educational difficulties assimilating in South Korea and rely on non-governmental organizations. Intergovernmental organizations such as the United Nations have repeatedly urged recipient nations of North Korean defectors to better identify defectors who are at high risk for poor mental health and to provide them with appropriate medical and social support.

About 15% of North Korean refugees say they have suicidal thoughts, compared to 5% for South Koreans overall.

==== Social and ethnic tensions ====
The politics of identity plays a considerable role in deepening the social and ethnic gulf that separates North and South. Most South Koreans, who unlike North Koreans can be readily interviewed and polled in large numbers, harbour at least somewhat negative attitudes towards their neighbors, which North Korean defectors have experienced up-close on arrival. In 2010, the Korean General Social Survey (KGSS) conducted face-to-face research of over 1,000 South Koreans on their perspectives on the ethnic identity of North Korean defectors assimilating into South Korea. The results reveal that South Koreans generally do not support the reunification of the two countries. One reason for this opposition is that some South Koreans have grown suspicious of defectors and of their true intentions in migrating southwards. South Koreans' politically (rather than personally) relevant antagonism against North Korea as a whole, however, is mainly targeted at its communist regime and at what they perceive as its contribution to the division of the formerly coherent national identity. Some have interpreted the outcome of the KGSS survey as evidence that the idea of "one nation, two countries" does not exist in the minds of most South Koreans. According to a 2015 UC Santa Cruz paper, many interviewed defectors wanted to resettle in China or emigrate to a Western country, due to bigotry, semi-official discrimination, difficulty with the ultra-competitive aspects of South Korean society, and disappointment with unfulfilled promises of ease and prosperity by missionaries and the government.

=== Australia ===
According to the 2021 census, 81 North Korean defectors live in Australia. Of these, most reported being ethnic Koreans who speak Korean at home, though some reported being ethnic Chinese who speak Chinese at home.

=== Canada ===
North Korean asylum seekers and defectors have been rising in numbers in Canada since 2006. Radio Free Asia reports that in 2007 alone, over 100 asylum applications were submitted, and that North Korean refugees have come from China or elsewhere with the help of Canadian missionaries and NGOs. The rapid increase in asylum applications to Canada is due to the limited options, especially when receiving asylum is becoming more difficult. On 2 February 2011, then-Prime Minister Stephen Harper met Hye Sook Kim, a North Korean defector and also received advice from Dr. Norbert Vollertsen, "Canada can persuade China, among others, not to repatriate the North Korean refugees back to North Korea but, instead, let them go to South Korea and other countries, including Canada." 780 North Koreans lived in Canada in 2016.

=== China ===
According to estimates by the US State Department, 30,000 to 50,000 defectors have legal refugee status, out of a larger total of North Koreans hiding in the country. China does not grant asylum or refugee status to North Koreans and, with few exceptions, considers them illegal immigrants and deports them back to North Korea. According to an ETH Zurich report, China does this to avoid jeopardising relations with Pyongyang. A 2009 world refugee study found that around 11,000 North Korean refugees remained in hiding in China close to the North Korean border.

Some NGOs have been releasing inflated numbers on the amount of North Korean defectors in China, but many experts and official organizations such as the UNHCR have criticized their figures as unreliable.

These refugees are not typically considered to be members of the ethnic Korean community, and the Chinese census does not count them as such. Some North Korean refugees who are unable to obtain transport to South Korea marry ethnic Koreans in China and settle there; they blend into the community but are subject to deportation if discovered by the authorities. Those who have found brokers and traffickers try to enter the South Korean consulate in Shenyang. The brokers are often Korean-Chinese or South Korean missionaries, or other North Korean defectors. As of 2002, the Chinese government has tightened the security and increased the number of police outside the consulate.

In 2015, the number of defectors crossing the border illegally to China was reported to be dropping due to increased border security, improved economy in North Korea, and Kim Jong Un's new promotion of legitimate labour migration. Lankov wrote that the vast majority of refugees would first move to China to earn money, and later decide to continue on to South Korea. According to documentarian Cho Cheon-hyeon in February 2021, most North Koreans in China preferred to stay there or return to the North rather than go to South Korea.

During the mid-1990s, the percentages of male and female defectors were relatively balanced. In early to mid-1990s, male labour was valuable since North Korean defectors could work in Chinese countrysides and factories and secure hideout in return. However, due to rising social security issues including crime and violence involving North Koreans, the value of male labour decreased. Females, on the other hand, were able to find easier means of settlement including performing smaller labour tasks and marrying Chinese locals (mostly ethnic Korean). As of today, 80–90% of North Korean defectors residing in China are females who settled through de facto marriage; a large number of them experience forced marriage and human trafficking.

Before 2009, over 70% of female North Korean defectors were victims of human trafficking. Due to their vulnerability as illegal migrants, they were sold for cheap prices, around 3,000 to 10,000 yuan. According to defector testimonies, those repatriated to North Korea are sentenced to penal-labour colonies (and/or executed), where Chinese-fathered babies are executed "to protect North Korean pure blood," and pregnant repatriates get forced abortions. After 2009, the percentage of female North Korean defectors with experience of human trafficking decreased to 15% since large numbers of defectors began to enter South Korea through organized groups led by brokers. Academics Andrei Lankov and Kyunghee Kook have disputed the label of human trafficking or forced marriages for some cases. Lankov wrote in 2010 that many Chinese husbands attempt to improve their Korean wives' official standing and may try expensively bribing the officials to get them a Chinese Resident Identity Card where they are registered as China-born ethnic Koreans.

In the early to mid-1990s, the Chinese government was relatively tolerant with the issue of North Korean defectors. Unless the North Korean government sent special requests, the Chinese government did not display serious control of the residence of North Koreans in Chinese territory. However, along with intensified North Korean famine in the late 1990s, the number of defectors drastically increased, which raised international attention. As a result, China stepped up the inspection of North Korean defectors and began their deportations. According to a 2014 paper from the Hankuk University of Foreign Studies, South Korean authorities in China would generally be unable (or unwilling) to help North Korean escapees who approached them, although there were exceptions where South Korea had requested Chinese permission for the transfer of a North Korean escapee who entered a South Korean diplomatic compound. Requests have usually been granted after 1–3 years.

In June 2002, a diplomatic row broke out between China and South Korea after Chinese security guards dragged a would-be asylum seeker from Seoul's embassy in Beijing. Before the incident, China had reportedly allowed North Koreans inside other foreign missions to go to South Korea by way of a third country, including a North Korean family who was detained in Shenyang on May. In 2012, Beijing allowed 5 defectors to leave for South Korea after they had spent three years in China.

In February 2012, Chinese authorities repatriated 19 North Korean defectors being held in Shenyang and five defectors in Changchun from the same location. The case of the 24 detainees, who had been held since early February, garnered international attention due to the North's reported harsh punishment of those who attempted to defect. Human-rights activists say those repatriated face harsh punishment, including torture and imprisonment in labour camps. North Korean repatriation gained Chinese media coverage on 2012, and drew sympathy towards the refugees from Chinese netizens.

In August 2014, 11 North Koreans detained by China on the Laos border was reported by Sky News to have been released rather than repatriated after talks between Chinese and South Korean diplomats.

In April 2016, China allowed 13 North Korean restaurant workers to defect to South Korea, with spokesman Lu Kang saying they all had valid identity documents. The case became controversial 2 years later after 4 waitresses said they were brought to the South against their will, with the restaurant manager claiming he had been pressured by South Korea's intelligence agency.

South Korean human-rights activists have held rallies at the Chinese embassy in Seoul and have appealed to the U.N. Human Rights Council to urge China to stop the deportation of the refugees. The North Korea Freedom Coalition has created a list alleging that thousands of North Korean defectors have been repatriated by China. For some of them the fate after repatriation to North Korea ranges from torture, detention, prison camp to execution. The list includes humanitarian workers, who were assassinated or abducted by North Korean agents for helping refugees.

In 2021, one such North Korean defector Zhu Xianjian escaped prison in China but was quickly recaptured by police. China's policy involves forcibly repatriating North Korean defectors, whom it calls illegal migrants rather than refugees. As such China can deal with such defectors as criminals within their own judicial and legal system.

=== Europe ===
In 2014, research by the human rights organisation the European Alliance for Human Rights in North Korea claims that there are around 1,400 North Korean refugees in Europe. Citing UNHRC statistics, the report identified North Korean communities in Belgium, Denmark, Finland, France, Germany, Luxembourg, the Netherlands, Norway, Sweden and the United Kingdom.

As of 2015, the largest North Korean community in Europe resides in New Malden, South West London. Approximately 600 North Koreans are believed to reside in the area, which is already notable for its significant South Korean community.

According to a Eurostat report, a total of 820 North Koreans became citizens of European Union countries in the 2007–2016 period, with nearly 90 percent of them living in Germany and Britain.

=== Japan ===
According to a 2020 Waseda University paper, Japanese diplomats and NGOs quietly collaborated with Chinese authorities to fly a number of defectors to Japan. China stopped collaborating with Japan on this issue in 2010 after relations deteriorated from the Senkaku Islands dispute.

There have been three cases of North Koreans defecting directly to Japan by boat. In January 1987, a stolen boat carrying 13 North Koreans washed ashore at Fukui Port in Fukui Prefecture, and then continued to South Korea via Taiwan. In June 2007, after a six-day boat ride a family of four North Koreans was found by the Japan Coast Guard off the coast of Aomori Prefecture. They later settled in South Korea. In September 2011, the Japan Coast Guard found a wooden boat containing nine people, three men, three women and three boys. The group had been sailing for five days towards South Korea but had drifted towards the Noto Peninsula and thought they had arrived in South Korea. They were found in good health.

Japan resettled about 140 ethnic Koreans who managed to return to Japan after initially immigrating to North Korea under the 1959–1984 mass "repatriation" project of ethnic Koreans from Japan. This supposed humanitarian project, supported by Chongryon and conducted by the Japanese and North Korean Red Crosses, had involved the resettlement of around 90,000 volunteers (mostly from South Korea) in North Korea, which Chongryon hailed as a "paradise on earth". Some of the Koreans who were repatriated, including Kim Hyon-hui, a student of Yaeko Taguchi, revealed evidence about the whereabouts of Japanese citizens who had been kidnapped by North Korea.

=== Laos ===
Public Radio International reported in 2011 that Laos, along with Vietnam and Myanmar, were largely unsympathetic to North Korean refugees. In 2013, nine defectors were arrested and sent back to North Korea. This caused international outrage partially because one of the defectors is the son of a Japanese abductee.

=== Mongolia ===
A much shorter route than the standard China-Laos-Thailand route is straight to Mongolia, whose government tries to maintain good relations with both North and South Korea, but is sympathetic to northern refugees. North Korean refugees who are caught in Mongolia are sent to South Korea, effectively granting them a free air ticket. However, using this route requires navigating the unforgiving terrain of the Gobi Desert. Also, tighter border control with China has made this route less common.

=== Philippines ===
The Philippines has been used in the past as a transit point for North Korean refugees, often arriving from China and then being sent on to South Korea. A 2005 leaked US embassy cable suggested that for 2 years, the South Korean embassy in Beijing facilitated the transit of nearly 500 refugees annually to Ninoy Aquino International Airport for transfer to South Korea. In its 2020 census, the Philippine Statistics Authority reported that there are 406 North Koreans with permanent resident status in the Philippines, with 159 living in Metro Manila. The country has been hard to reach due to the fact refugees have to cross China and get on a boat to the archipelago.

A notable incident of North Korean defection to the Philippines happened in 1997 when Hwang Jang-yop, who served as the Chairman of the Supreme People's Assembly from 1972 to 1983, defected to South Korea. He initially walked into the South Korean embassy in Beijing posing as one of their diplomats. The Chinese government cordoned off the embassy from leaving, but a few weeks later a deal was brokered, and Hwang and his companion Kim Duk-hong were permitted to leave Beijing for a 3rd country. The Philippines was selected as a transit point before they could fly to South Korea. President Fidel V. Ramos tasked the National Security Advisor Jose T. Almonte in ensuring the safety of the North Korean defectors. Hwang and Kim arrived in Clark Air Base, and were taken custody by the National Intelligence Coordinating Agency (NICA) and brought them to a safe house in Baguio City. The media soon found out, and Baguio City was the center of a media frenzy. This prompted the NICA to move Hwang and Kim to another safe house near Manila. After two weeks, Hwang and Kim were turned over to the South Korean authorities, and were flown to Seoul.

=== Russia ===
A study by Kyung Hee University estimated that roughly 10,000 North Koreans live in the Russian Far East; many are escapees from North Korean work camps there. This includes a population in Kamchatka, which was around 1,800 by 2020.

To cross the 17-kilometre border between Russia and North Korea, defectors must find a way across the Tumen River. This is rarely done, because Russia's short stretch of the river is far better patrolled than China's stretch. Even when they succeed, the rewards for doing so are not as high since the ethnic Korean community in Russia is far smaller to receive sufficient support from, as opposed to China, which has a larger Korean population. Lastly, North Korea is believed to have infiltrated Russia in search of defectors and those who support them, as explained below.

Both South Korean diplomatic missions and local ethnic Koreans are reluctant to provide them with any assistance; it is believed that North Korea ordered the assassination of South Korean consul Choi Duk-gun in 1996 as well as two private citizens in 1995, in response to their contact with the refugees. As of 1999, there were estimated to be only between 100 and 500 North Korean refugees in the area. In 2014, Russia and North Korea drafted an agreement to deport illegal immigrants found to be living in either country.

=== Thailand ===
Thailand is generally the final destination of North Koreans escaping through China. While North Koreans are not given refugee status and are officially classified as illegal immigrants, the Thai government will deport them to South Korea instead of back to North Korea. This is because South Korea recognizes native Koreans from the entire Korean Peninsula as citizens. These North Korean escapees are subject to imprisonment for illegal entry; however, most of these sentences are suspended. Recognizing this, many North Koreans will in fact surrender themselves to the Royal Thai Police as soon as they cross the border into Thailand.

=== United States ===
On 5 May 2006, unnamed North Koreans were granted refugee status by the United States, the first time the U.S. accepted refugees from there since President George W. Bush signed the North Korean Human Rights Act in October 2004. The group, which arrived from an unnamed Southeast Asian nation, included four women who said that they had been the victims of forced marriage. Since this first group of refugees, the U.S. has admitted approximately 170 North Korean refugees by 2014. Between 2004 and 2011, the U.S. has admitted only 122 North Korean refugees and only 25 have received political asylum. A number of North Koreans have entered illegally, estimated at 200, and generally settle in Koreatown, Los Angeles. An aunt and uncle of Kim Jong Un have lived in the United States since 1998.

The first official North Korean refugees entered the United States on May 5, 2006. These six refugees were the first since the North Korean Human Rights Act was signed in 2004. The number of North Koreans in the United States remains low due to the difficulty of escaping North Korea, South Korea's policy regarding the Northern refugees, and the United States' long-standing belief that North Koreans should be resettled in South Korea. Immigration to the United States for North Koreans remains difficult due to the many obstacles placed in front of them.

North Koreans Granted Asylum in the United States
| Year | Total Number Granted Asylum |
|---|---|
| 2003 | 0 |
| 2011 | 25 |
| 2022 | 224 |

==== North Korean Human Rights Act of 2004 ====
On October 18, 2004, United States President George W. Bush signed the North Korean Human Rights Act (NKHRA) into law. The main purpose of this law was to encourage North Korea to treat those within their borders well and to protect those who have escaped. One of the paths this law creates is the possibility for North Korean defectors to apply for United States immigration status. This law also appointed a special envoy for North Korean Human Rights issues, one of which was Robert R. King, who was appointed by Barack Obama in 2009 and served until 2017. King wrote extensively about this issue and North Korean immigration to the U.S. and how this law impacted North Koreans.

This act "clarifies that North Koreans are eligible to apply for U.S. refugee and asylum consideration and are not preemptively disqualified by any prospective claim to citizenship they may have under the South Korean constitution."

This law was valid through 2008 and has been reauthorized in 2008, 2012, and 2017, and is, as of November 28, 2024, working on re-authorization in 2024. Each re-authorization has lasted four years.

Another major obstacle that North Koreans face when attempting to relocate to the United States is the amount of time required to wait for a decision from the government. While in South Korea, their paperwork could be processed generally within a 2-4 week window, the United States takes on average 18–24 months to go through the process. "From October 2004 to March 2010, 107 out of 238 [North Korean] refugee applicants withdrew their applications..." Many no longer even attempt to gain refugee or asylum status in the States due to this long and rigorous process. Although many would like to settle in the United States, "word of mouth ha[s] it that asylum criteria in the U.S. are too strict." This reality limits even further the number of North Korean refugees in the United States.

Despite the passing of this law in 2004 to aid the human rights of North Koreans, they still face difficulties in obtaining refugee or asylum status. The number of North Koreans granted asylum in the United States remains low, especially in comparison to other demographics from around the world.

Nationality of New Immigrants in the United States in 2010
| North Korea | Iraq | Burma | Bhutan | Somalia | Cuba | Iran | Democratic Republic of the Congo | Eritrea | Vietnam | Ethiopia |
| 25 | 18,016 | 16,693 | 12,363 | 4,884 | 4,818 | 3,543 | 3,174 | 2,570 | 873 | 668 |

One of the main difficulties in gaining asylum is proving a credible fear of persecution or torture not only in North Korea but also in South Korea due to their citizenship in both countries. Once they avail themselves of South Korean citizenship, they are no longer eligible for asylum in the United States. This creates "a distinction between having a legal right to citizenship and availing oneself of that right".

The Board of Immigration Appeals goes even further, "argu[ing] that the mere availability of permanent resident status in another country (whether or not acted upon) “may be sufficient” to prove that the person is firmly resettled and therefore ineligible for refugee or asylum status in the U.S." This ruling once again makes it almost impossible to enter the United States as an asylum seeker or refugee. North Koreans, however, have not had exposure to the outside world, let alone know the laws of both South Korea and the United States. They do not know the rules and regulations of both countries and how their actions will affect their future options. To illustrate this continuing difficulty, below is a table of the number of North Koreans who entered the United States.

North Koreans Entered the United States in Fiscal Year
| 2017 | 2018 | 2019 | 2020 |
|---|---|---|---|
| 12 | 5 | 1 | 2 |

If North Korean escapees choose to attempt to find refuge in the United States, they cannot have gained South Korean citizenship, which offers them financial assistance. They instead must live in a detention center while they wait. "If North Korean escapees choose to go to the United States, they must wait in a detention facility in Southeast Asia. Most North Korean refugee applications to resettle in the United States are processed in Bangkok."

=== Vietnam ===
Many defectors who reach China travel onward to southeast Asia, especially Vietnam. The journey consists of crossing the Tumen River, either when frozen or shallow in summer, in camouflage, and then taking the train secretly across China. From there, they can either work illegally, though often exploited, or attempt to travel to South Korea. According to the International Crisis Group in 2006, although Vietnam maintained diplomatic relations with North Korea, growing South Korean investment in Vietnam had prompted Hanoi to tolerate the transit of some North Korean refugees to Seoul. Four of the biggest defector safe-houses in Vietnam were run by South Korean expatriates. In July 2004, 468 North Korean refugees were airlifted to South Korea in the single largest mass defection; Vietnam initially tried to keep their role in the airlift secret, and in advance of the deal, even anonymous sources in the South Korean government would only tell reporters that the defectors came from "an unidentified Asian country". Following the airlift, Vietnam tightened border controls and deported several safehouse operators.

In June 2002, 17 North Korean defectors were reportedly captured by Vietnamese border forces and deported to China. Five North Korean defectors who surrendered to the Ho Chi Minh City police in May 2004 in an appeal to go to South Korea were reportedly deported to China by Vietnamese authorities on 16 June.

On 25 June 2012, a South Korean activist surnamed Yoo was arrested in Vietnam for helping the North Korean defectors to escape. He was reportedly released after eight days and then deported to Seoul.

Nine North Koreans were arrested on 22 October 2015 and then reportedly deported to the Chinese city of Shenyang. In April 2019, six North Koreans were stopped by Vietnamese military authorities in the Hà Tĩnh Province; three managed to escape while the other three were reportedly deported to China. On 23 November 2019, 14 defectors who had left China two days earlier were caught in Vietnam as they attempted to make their way to Laos. The Vietnamese authorities returned the group to China on 28 November. Ten of the original 14 were caught again in Vietnam the next day.

According to a Seoul-based activist group in January 2020, 11 North Koreans detained in Vietnam while seeking to defect to South Korea were released with the help of European institutions. A Wall Street Journal report said that US officials had intervened to secure the defectors' release; the report's accuracy was questioned by South Korea's Foreign Ministry and the activist group's leader.

== Psychological and cultural adjustment ==
North Korean defectors experience serious difficulties connected to psychological and cultural adjustment once they have been resettled. This occurs mainly because of the conditions and environment that North Koreans lived in while in their own country, as well as inability to fully comprehend new culture, rules, and ways of living in South Korea.

Difficulties in adjustment often come in the form of post-traumatic stress disorder. In the case of North Koreans, such traumatic events and experiences include brutality from the regime, starvation, and propaganda.

Some studies have found the direct connection between physical illness and PTSD. PTSD serves as an explanation of the link between the exposure to trauma and physical health: exposure to trauma leads to worsening of the physical health condition. Related symptoms include disturbing memories or dreams relating to the traumatic events, anxiety, mental or physical distress, alterations in the ways of thinking. Depression and somatization are two of the conventional forms of PTSD, both of which are diagnosed among North Korean defectors with females having larger statistic numbers of the disorder diagnoses.

According to a recent survey, about 56% of the North Korean defectors are influenced by one or more types of psychological disorders. 93% of surveyed North Korean defectors identify food and water shortages and no access to medical care and, thus, constant illness as the most common types of their traumatic experiences preceding PTSD. Such traumatic experiences greatly influence the ways North Korean defectors adjust in new places. PTSD often prevents defectors from adequately assimilating into a new culture as well as from being able to hold jobs and accumulate material resources.

Traumatic events are not the only reason why North Koreans experience difficulty adjusting to the new way of living. Woo Teak-jeon conducted interviews with 32 North Korean defectors living in South Korea and found that other adjustment difficulties that are not related to PTSD occur due to such factors as the defector's suspiciousness, their way of thinking, prejudice of the new society, and unfamiliar sets of values. In many instances, North Korean defectors seem to be unable to easily adjust to the new way of living even when it comes to nutrition. According to research conducted by The Korean Nutrition Society, North Koreans used to consuming only small portions of food in North Korea daily, continue to exercise the same type of habits even when given an abundance of food and provision.

Psychological and cultural adjustment of North Koreans to the new norms and rules is a sensitive issue, but it has some ways of resolution. According to Yoon, collective effort of the defectors themselves, the government, NGOs, and humanitarian and religious organizations can help make the adjustment process smoother and less painful.

The non-profit NGO Freedom Speakers International (FSI), formerly known as Teach North Korean Refugee (TNKR) has received positive recognition for aiding refugees' adjustment to life outside of North Korea. According to their website, FSI's mission is to empower North Korean refugees to find their own voice and path through education, advocacy, and support. Their primary focus is to assist North Korean refugees in preparing for their future and transitioning to life outside of North Korea by providing free English learning opportunities. FSI also hosts bi-annual English public speaking contests for North Korean refugees and holds public forums that offer first-hand accounts of life in, escape from, and adjustment outside of North Korea. FSI was founded in 2013 by Casey Lartigue Jr. and Eunkoo Lee, who currently co-direct the organization. Lartigue Jr. and Lee gave a joint TEDx Talk in 2017 that tells the history of FSI and offers practical lessons for making the world a better place.

== Return to North Korea ==
In some cases, defectors voluntarily return to North Korea. Double defectors either take a route through third countries such as China, or may defect directly from South Korea. From 2012 to 2021 the Unification Ministry had recorded 30 defector returns, but there were likely more unrecorded returns. A former South Korean MP estimated that in 2012 about 100 defectors returned to North Korea via China. In 2015, it was reported that about 700 defectors living in South Korea are unaccounted for and have possibly fled to China or Southeast Asia in hopes of returning to North Korea. In one case, a double defector re-entered North Korea four times.

Under Kim Jong Un, North Korea has allegedly started a campaign to attract defectors to return with promises of money, housing, employment, and no punishments. A foreign diplomat in Pyongyang said in 2013 that not all returning defectors are trucked to prison; they can instead be put on TV for propaganda purposes. According to unconfirmed reports, government operatives have contacted defectors living in South Korea and offered them guarantees that their families are safe, 50 million South Korean Won ($44,000), and a public appearance on TV. Business Insider reported in 2013 that North Korea had aired at least 13 such appearances on TV where returning defectors complain about poor living conditions in the South and pledge allegiance to Kim Jong Un. In November 2016, North Korean website Uriminzokkiri aired an interview with three double defectors who complained that they had been treated as second-class citizens. ABC News reported in 2017 that 25% of all defectors in South Korea have seriously considered returning home.

In 2013, a re-defector was charged by South Korea upon return. In 2016, defector Kim Ryon-hui's request to return to North Korea was denied by the South Korean government. In June 2017, Jeon Hye-sung, a defector who had been a guest on several South Korean TV shows using the name Lim Ji-hyun, returned to the North. On North Korean TV, she said that she had been ill-treated and pressured into fabricating stories detrimental to North Korea. In July 2017, a man who had defected to the South and then returned to the North was arrested under the National Security Act when he entered the South again.

In 2019, South Korea deported two North Korean fishermen who tried to defect, saying that an investigation had found the men had killed 16 of their crewmates. In July 2020, North Korea reported a suspected case of COVID-19 in a man who had defected to the South and then swam to the North from Ganghwa Island.

On 2 January 2022, a defector returned to North Korea by crossing the DMZ. The man had been in South Korea for about a year, and had been working as a cleaner "barely scraping a living" according to a South Korean official. South Korea launched an inquiry into why, despite surveillance cameras showing his exit, troops did not stop him.

In 2021, a survey by the Database Center for North Korean Human Rights and NK Social Research found that 18% of 407 defectors polled were willing to return to North Korea.

In 2024, a defector stole a bus close to the DMZ and rammed a barricade while attempting to return to North Korea by crossing Tongil bridge. They were sentenced to 2 years of suspended prison with a 3 year probation period. During their trial, they stated that they had never starved in North Korea for more than a day, while in South Korea they had starved for a week, getting to point of thinking they would die due to not having enough money. The defector defected to South Korea in 2011.

== Famous North Korean defectors ==
Yeonmi Park is one of the most vocal and famous North Korean defectors. Despite her fame, there are significant questions about the veracity of her claims and story. The accuracy of her story has been hotly debated since 2014, when John Power, a journalist based in Seoul, South Korea, published an article calling her story into question, citing inconsistencies and inaccuracies.

In May 2016, it was revealed that the North Korean leader, Kim Jong Un, has an aunt and uncle who escaped North Korea and have been living in the United States since 1998. They escaped while living in Europe to raise Kim Jong Un and his older brother Kim Jong Chol. They took their three children to the American Embassy in Bern, Switzerland, and asked for asylum in the United States. This was an unusual path to immigration as they had unique access outside North Korea.

== Representation in fiction and non-fiction ==
=== Books ===
- No Space for Love: A North Korean Defector Story of Love and Survival by Ellen Mason
- A River in Darkness: One Man's Escape from North Korea, by Masaji Ishikawa, a memoir of escape to China
- Dear Leader: My Escape from North Korea, a 2014 memoir by Jang Jin-sung.
- Escape from Camp 14, by Blaine Harden, a 2012 biography of Shin Dong-hyuk, a North Korean defector who was born and raised in Kaechon internment camp.
- Every Falling Star: The True Story of How I Survived and Escaped North Korea, a 2016 book telling the story of Sungju Lee, a defector who grew up as an orphan in North Korea.
- Fortune Smiles, a book of short stories by Adam Johnson whose title story features two defectors adjusting to life in Seoul.
- Greenlight to Freedom: A North Korean Daughter's Search for Her Mother and Herself, a memoir by North Korean defector Songmi Han and Casey Lartigue Jr.
- I Escaped North Korea! – by Ellie Crowe and Scott Peters – 2019 middle-grade story of a North Korean orphan fleeing through China;
- In Order to Live: A North Korean Girl's Journey to Freedom by Yeonmi Park talks about her escape from North Korea into China and finally South Korea.
- Le Défecteur de Pyongyang, by Gérard de Villiers, a two volume graphic novel from the SAS series.
- Nothing to Envy: Ordinary Lives in North Korea, by Barbara Demick, focuses on the pre-and-post defection lives of several individuals from Chongjin.
- The Girl with Seven Names: Escape from North Korea, a 2015 autobiography of Hyeonseo Lee, a woman who escaped from North Korea by crossing the Yalu River in 1997.
- The Orphan Master's Son, a 2012 Pulitzer Prize winning novel by Adam Johnson.
- The Courage To Die: A North Korean Woman’s Escape and Rebirth in Freedom, a self-published auto-biography by Eunhee Park, a North Korean defector who was born and raised in Wonsan, documenting her challenging childhood, her defection at age 22, and life up until her early-30s.

=== Films ===
- Escape – 2024 action thriller film about Lim Gyu-nam, planning to defect to South Korea due to disillusionment with the regime, facing numerous challenges from North Korean officers.
- My Name Is Loh Kiwan – 2024 drama film about the experiences of a North Korean defector (played by Song Joong-ki) who travels to Belgium for refuge.
- Beautiful Days – 2018 dramatic film about a North Korean defector (played by Lee Na-young) who abandons her Korean Chinese family for a better life in South Korea.
- Beyond Utopia – 2023 documentary about a South Korean pastor facilitating the escape of a North Korean family via China, Vietnam, Laos and Thailand, with much of their journey captured by hidden camera.
- Confidential Assignment – the main antagonist of this 2017 movie, Cha Ki-seong (played by Kim Joo-hyuk) is a renegade North Korean official from Hoeryong who, furious at the North Korean regime for killing his wife, steals plates to make counterfeit supernotes and creating his criminal empire, and as a consequence, ends up fleeing to South Korea
- Crossing – 2008 film about a North Korean defector, Kim Yong-soo (played by Cha In-pyo), who flees to China in search of medicine for his sick wife;
- Loyal Citizens of Pyongyang in Seoul (서울의 평양 시민들), a 2018 independent documentary;
- Over the Border – the main character of this movie, Kim Sun-ho (played by Cha Seung-won) is a North Korean classical musician who defects to South Korea after unintentionally putting his family in danger by exchanging letters with his grandfather, who resides in Seoul for several years before the events of the film.
- Poongsan – The female protagonist of this 2011 film, In-Ok (played by Kim Gyu-ri) is a beautiful North Korean defector from Pyongyang, North Korea who is brought to South Korea to be close to her lover, a high-ranking North Korean official (played by Kim Jong-soo) who also defected to South Korea, but she ends up falling in love with the protagonist, a messenger known only as "Poongsan" (played by Yoon Kye-sang).
- Seoul Train – 2004 documentary film that deals with the dangerous journeys of North Korean refugees fleeing through or to China;
- Shadow Flowers – 2019 documentary about Ryun-hee Kim, directed by Seung-jun Yi;
- The Defector: Escape from North Korea, a 2013 documentary film;
- The Journals of Musan – This 2011 film, based on true events, tells the story of Jeon Seung-chul (played by Park Jung-bum), a North Korean defector who struggles to adapt to his new life in South Korea.
- The Suspect – The protagonist of this 2013 film, Ji Dong-cheol (played by Gong Yoo) is a former North Korean spy who defects to South Korea in search of revenge against a former agency colleague who was responsible for his family's death.
- Wild Animals – 1997 film about a North Korean defector and former Korean People's Army soldier, Hong-san (played by Jang Dong-jik), who flees to Paris in search of a better life.
- Mayumi – 1990 film about defected North Korean agent Kim Hyon-hui during her mission to bomb Korean Air Flight 858 and her subsequent arrest and trial.

=== Television ===
- Doctor Stranger
- Blow Breeze – a 2016 MBC weekend drama has as protagonist Kim Mi-poong (played by Lim Ji-yeon), a young North Korean woman who defects to Seoul, South Korea in search of her dancing dream.
- Crash Landing on You – a 2019 South Korean romantic drama about a woman who accidentally lands in North Korea and gets rescued by a Korean People's Army captain who helps her escape the country.
- Move to Heaven – a 2021 Netflix South Korean drama has, among its recurring characters, a North Korean defector, Park Joo-taek (portrayed by Lee Moon-sik).
- Squid Game – a 2021 Netflix South Korean drama which has a North Korean defector from North Hamgyong Province, Kang Sae-byeok (portrayed by Jung Ho-yeon) as one of their main characters.
- Extraordinary Attorney Woo – The main case of episode 6 of ENA's 2022 South Korean legal drama Extraordinary Attorney Woo involves a character named Gye Hyang-shim (played by Kim Hieora), a North Korean defector who suffers from drug addiction and is accused of robbery and assault.

== See also ==
- Deportation of North Koreans by the South Korean Government
- South Korean defectors
- Unconverted long-term prisoners
- Free North Korea Radio
- Liberty in North Korea
- HanVoice
- Americans in North Korea

Similar migrants fleeing to Free World:

- Republikflucht
- Eastern Bloc emigration and defection
- Refugee wave to British Hong Kong
- Operation Passage to Freedom
