= Masaji =

- Gender: Male

Origin
- Origin: Japanese
- Meaning: Different meanings depending on the kanji used

Masaji (written: 政司, 政治, 政次, 正次, 雅治 or 正二) is a masculine Japanese given name. Notable people with the name include:

- Haguroyama Masaji (羽黒山 政司; 1914–1969), Japanese sumo wrestler
- Masaji Hiramatsu (平松 政次; born 1947), Japanese former professional baseball pitcher
- Masaji Iguro (伊黒 正次; 1913–2000), Japanese ski jumper
- Masaji Ishikawa (石川 昌司; born 1947), North Korean defector and author on Zainichi heritage
- Masaji Kitano (北野 政次; 1894–1986), Japanese physician, general and businessman
- Masaji Kiyokawa (清川 正二; 1913–1999), Japanese swimmer and businessman
- Masaji Kusakabe (草壁 政治; born 1946), Japanese professional golfer
- Masaji Marumoto (丸本 正二; 1906–1995), Japanese American justice of the Supreme Court of Hawaii
- Masaji Matsuyama (松山 政司; born 1959), Japanese politician
- Masaji Ogino (荻野 正二; born 1970), Japanese volleyball player
- Masaji Shimizu (清水 雅治; born 1964), Japanese baseball player
- Masaji Tabata (田畑 政治; 1898–1984), Japanese educator, journalist, and swimming coach
- Masaji Taira (平良 正次; born 1952), Japanese karateka
- Masaji Tajima (田島 政治; born 1929), Japanese long jumper
