= Evan Hunziker =

American detainee in North Korea (1970-1996)

Evan C. Hunziker
- Born: June 2, 1970; Tacoma, Washington, U.S.
- Died: December 18, 1996 (aged 26); Tacoma, Washington, U.S.

Detainment
- Country: North Korea
- Detained: August 24, 1996
- Released: November 27, 1996
- Days in detention: 95
- Reason for detention: Illegally entering North Korea

Evan Carl Hunziker (June 2, 1970 – December 18, 1996) was the first American civilian to be arrested by North Korea on espionage charges since the end of the Korean War. On August 24, 1996, Hunziker was taken into custody by North Korean police after swimming into the country across the Yalu River from the People's Republic of China. Hunziker spent three months in North Korean custody before being released and returned to the United States thanks to the negotiation efforts of then-New Mexico congressman Bill Richardson. However, less than a month after his return, Hunziker killed himself.

== Early life ==
Hunziker's father, Edwin Hunziker, was an American veteran of the Korean War who had spent 12 years stationed in South Korea with the United States Forces Korea, and while living there, met Hunziker's Korean mother, Jong Nye, a South Korean citizen. The two later moved to the United States, settling in Tacoma, Washington, where they had three children, and Hunziker's father worked in a variety of jobs including as a bus driver and cement layer. Hunziker's father developed a drinking problem, and in 1974 Hunziker's father and mother divorced. Hunziker moved with his mother to Anchorage, Alaska, where he spent most of his childhood with various relatives of his mother's. Hunziker and his mother eventually moved back to Tacoma, where she opened the Olympus Hotel. In 1988 Hunziker graduated from Stadium High School in Tacoma. He went on to attend colleges in Yakima and South Seattle on a football scholarship, but began drinking and using drugs, and did not graduate.

Hunziker later returned to Anchorage, where his mother was running a motel with her boyfriend, Kevin Hux. There, Hunziker helped out with the business, often driving guests to and from the airport. Hunziker's mother later introduced him to a young South Korean woman in the hopes that the two would develop a relationship, and they married soon after. However, Hunziker's drug and alcohol problems, combined with his increasing violence towards his wife and his relatives, led to the failure of his marriage in 1993. His mother applied for a restraining order against him in that same year, and Hux filed for another restraining order two years later after Hunziker allegedly stabbed him in the face with a pencil, and assaulted twelve motel employees and guests in the space of a month. In another incident, Hunziker attempted to forcibly remove his former wife from a hospital, and attacked a nurse when she attempted to intervene. From 1992 to 1996, Hunziker was arrested seven times on a variety of charges including assault, malicious destruction, and drunk driving.

Hunziker reportedly converted to Christianity while in jail, and upon his seventh release, in 1995, fled back to Washington hoping to avoid being brought up on pending criminal assault charges that his mother had filed against him in Alaska. In mid-1996, Hunziker decided that he wanted to go to South Korea to find a job as an English teacher and evangelize. He borrowed money for an airline ticket to Seoul, and left the United States in July, staying with his cousin Yun Jae-hun. According to his parents, Hunziker could speak Korean well, and it was his third trip to South Korea, including the first one during which he met his wife-to-be. From Seoul, he took a trip to the People's Republic of China beginning on August 16, spending one week in Beijing before proceeding to northeast China by train.

== Detention in North Korea ==
On August 24, 1996, Hunziker swam across the Yalu River from Dandong on the China–North Korea border, on a dare from a friend with whom he had been drinking alcohol. North Korean farmers found him and summoned the police, who arrested him. Swedish diplomats were able to visit Hunziker once after his detention, on September 17. North Korea ignored later requests from the United States that Hunziker be allowed to receive regular visits. The North Korean government did not announce Hunziker's arrest until October 6, and analysts suspected they delayed the announcement until a more strategic time in an attempt to divert attention from two other international controversies: one regarding the unsolved murder of South Korean consul for the Russian Far East, Choe Deok-geun, in which North Korean involvement was suspected, and the other about the landing on South Korean soil of a North Korean submarine containing 26 commandos. On October 8, the North Korean government formally announced that they would charge Hunziker with espionage, a charge which could bring the death penalty.

Edwin Hunziker called his congressman, Randy Tate, in an attempt to learn what, if anything, the United States government was doing for his son. Evan Hunziker was permitted to send a letter home on October 12, in which he stated that "I came across the border as a Christian man first and foremost to promote peace, and ... I have not confessed to being a spy". Soon after, Hunziker was moved from the hotel where he had been held initially to a detention center. Edwin Hunziker would later recall his son's description of the food, that it "was edible and it was sustainable, but it was lousy food". He reportedly signed several confessions, though under psychological duress.

== Release by North Korea ==
Eventually, Bill Richardson, a New Mexico congressman who had a history of negotiating for the release of Americans held by countries with whom the United States had poor or no formal relations, arranged to go to North Korea to discuss the matter. Richardson went as a private citizen, but was accompanied by a representative of the United States Department of State, arriving in North Korea on November 24. According to Richardson, the North Korean mission to the United Nations in New York City initially demanded US$100,000 as a bail and fine for the release of Hunziker, whom they considered a spy and an illegal interloper. However, Richardson refused this demand as an unacceptable quid pro quo which would imply Hunziker's guilt.

Eventually, the two sides settled on payment of $5,000 hotel costs for the period of Hunziker's incarceration, which Hunziker's family, rather than the government, paid. Richardson stated that the money was not the major trigger for Hunziker's release; rather, he speculated that the North Korean side realized they had made a major mistake during the incident where a submarine full of their commandos landed on South Korean soil, which occurred only weeks after Hunziker's arrest, and hoped to reduce tensions and regain aid. He also stated that the North Korean military had been opposed to Hunziker's release. Hunziker was first flown to Yokota Air Base in Japan for a medical examination on November 27, where he was found to have two red marks on his neck, possibly rope burns; North Korea claimed he attempted to hang himself while in custody. He arrived back in the United States via Seattle-Tacoma International Airport.

== Death ==
After his release, Hunziker moved back to Tacoma, into the Olympus Hotel owned by his mother, as he would not return to Alaska due to the three outstanding warrants for his arrest by the Anchorage police. According to friends, relatives, and fellow hotel residents, he seemed happy, though not talkative. Hunziker often spent his nights in the hotel restaurant, where he was found dead on the morning of December 18, lying on a bench with a gunshot wound to the head and his cousin's .357 Magnum revolver lying next to him.

== See also ==
- 2009 imprisonment of American journalists by North Korea
- List of foreign nationals detained in North Korea
