= Lim Ji-hyun =

North Korean defector

Lim Ji-Hyun
- 임지현
- Born: Chun Hye-Sung; April 1991; North Korea
- Disappeared: 2017; Seoul, South Korea
- Known for: Life in North Korea

Jeon Hye-sung (commonly known as Lim Ji-Hyun) is a North Korean defector known primarily for her disappearance from her home in Seoul and subsequent reappearance on North Korean Television in 2017. Before this, she was known for publicly detailing her life in North Korea.

== Career in South Korea ==
In April 2014, Lim escaped from North Korea into China by paying brokers all of her savings. She worked as a bartender in Seoul before becoming famous on social media for telling her stories on life in North Korea.

She became a frequent guest on South Korean Television.

=== Sex worker allegations ===
Lim was accused of being a sex worker while in China. Multiple photos were released supposedly showing Lim engaging in sexual acts. These photos were later revealed to not be of Lim.

== Disappearance and reappearance ==
Lim disappeared from South Korea in 2017. According to the police, her home was left virtually untouched.

In June 2017, Lim reappeared in an interview on North Korean TV. During the interview, she claimed that life in South Korea is "hell on earth," and said that she regretted her decision to defect, and later begged Kim Jong Un for forgiveness. She claimed to be living with her parents in the North Korean city of Anju. It was also her last known appearance.

While she claimed that she returned to North Korea on her own volition, many speculated that she was kidnapped by North Korean agents. She also said that all accounts of her life in North Korea had been scripted.
