= Korea-Mongolia Friendship Forest =

Forest in Sükhbaatar, Ulaanbaatar, Mongolia

Korea-Mongolia Friendship Forest Mongolian: Монгол-Солонгосын Нөхөрлөлийн Ой
- Interactive map of Korea-Mongolia Friendship Forest

Geography
- Location: Sükhbaatar, Ulaanbaatar, Mongolia
- Coordinates: 47°59′03″N 106°56′59″E
- Area: 40 ha (99 acres)

Administration
- Established: 2023

Ecology
- Dominant tree species: 36

The Korea-Mongolia Friendship Forest (Mongolian: Монгол-Солонгосын Нөхөрлөлийн Ой; previously known as Forest Research and Development Center Arboretum Park) is a forest in Sükhbaatar District, Ulaanbaatar, Mongolia.

== History ==
The establishment of the forest was made as part of the second phase of Korea-Mongolia Greenbelt Reforestation Initiative. The project started in 2017 where the design was made and approved by 2018. In 2019, the soil treatment was performed. In 2020, a training and information center was constructed. It was jointly established by the Ministry of Environment and Tourism of Mongolia and Korea Forest Service. It was opened in 2023.

== Geology ==
The forest spans over an area of 40 hectares. It has a total of 55,000 trees and shrubs from 36 different plant species.

== Architecture ==
The forest features bicycle path, playground, sports area and car parks.

== Finance ==
The forest was established with a cost of EUR8 million.

== See also ==
- Geography of Mongolia
- Mongolia–South Korea relations
