= Werner Weinhold =

East German soldier (1949–2024)

Werner Weinhold (8 August 1949 – 2 May 2024) was a trained lathe operator and NVA soldier. He had been convicted four times between 1966 and 1975 for multiple car thefts and a sex crime. While on probation, on 19 December 1975, he shot and killed two East German border guards, Jürgen Lange and Klaus Peter Seidel, during a successful attempt to cross the Inner German border from the German Democratic Republic (East Germany) to the Federal Republic of Germany (then called West Germany). He had deserted and had stolen some weapons, ammunition, and a vehicle from the NVA barracks in Spremberg. The escape took place near the town of Hildburghausen, Thuringia.

Weinhold was tried in the West German courts and was at first acquitted. At a second trial in 1978, he was found guilty of two counts of manslaughter and armed motor vehicle theft and sentenced to 5.5 years in prison. He was released from prison in July 1982. The incident received much press coverage at the time in both German states. The East German government refused to cooperate with the investigation and repeatedly demanded Weinhold's extradition.

In 1993, East German Ministry for State Security General Gerhard Neiber was accused of planning the assassination of Weinhold after he had been released from prison in West Germany, but no charges were brought due to unclear evidence.

On 8 January 2005, Weinhold shot and seriously injured a 43-year-old acquaintance at a bar. He was sentenced to 2.5 years in prison for grievous bodily harm.

Weinhold died on 2 May 2024, at the age of 74.

== Popular culture ==
The computer game Wargame: European Escalation creates an alternate history scenario where Werner Weinhold's 1975 defection causes military skirmishes to erupt between East and West Germany that escalate into World War III between NATO and the Warsaw Pact.

== See also ==
- Deportation of North Koreans by the South Korean Government
