= Zhu Xianjian =

North Korean defector and robber sentenced to prison

Chinese name
- Simplified Chinese: 朱贤健
Transcriptions
Standard Mandarin
- Hanyu Pinyin: Zhū Xiánjiàn

Korean name
- Hangul: 주현건
Transcriptions
- Revised Romanization: Ju Hyeongeon
- McCune–Reischauer: Chu Hyŏn'gŏn

Zhu Xianjian (Chinese: 朱贤健; Korean: 주현건) is a North Korean defector who was sentenced to 11 years in prison in China for robbery and illegally crossing the China-North Korea border. In 2021, he escaped prison for 40 days, but was recaptured by Chinese police. During the manhunt for Zhu, a bounty of up to $100,000 was placed for his capture.

== Background ==
Zhu was a North Korean coal miner and member of the Korean People's Army Special Operations Forces. He is 160 cm in height.

On 21 July 2013, Zhu Xianjian illegally entered China from North Korea. Around midnight, Zhu swam across a river from northeastern North Korea to Tumen, Jilin in Yanbian Korean Autonomous Prefecture in Northeast China. Zhu then broke into several houses and stole money, clothes, and phones. An old woman witnessed Zhu's crimes and called for help. Zhu then took out a knife and stabbed that woman while trying to steal her satchel. The woman was injured but survived. Zhu tried to flee by taxi, but was arrested within hours.

In March 2014, the court of Yanji in Jilin convicted Zhu of larceny, robbery, and illegally crossing the border. Zhu was fined 16,000 yuan and sentenced to 11 years in prison followed by deportation. Zhu would be jailed in a Jilin prison, and after he served his sentence he would be deported back to North Korea.

While in prison, Zhu was forced to do labor and participate in ideological education.

=== Prison break, manhunt, and recapture ===
On 18 or 19 October 2021, Zhu escaped the Jilin prison by scaling a shed and running over a roof. He then damaged the prison electric fence with a rope and escaped. Prison guards chased after Zhu, and police conducted a manhunt for Zhu as well as a house to house search. China placed a bounty of more than $23,000 for Zhu's capture. This was eventually increased to more than $100,000.

After 40 days, on 28 November, Zhu was finally recaptured by the police around 10am Sunday morning (local time), around Fengman District (丰满区松花湖黑瞎子沟). He was 39 years old at the time.

== Aftermath and reactions ==
Zhu's initial escape was captured on video by Chinese state media and widely broadcast. A hashtag related to Zhu and his bounty had garnered over 22 million views on Weibo. But soon, the bounty notice and many videos were scrubbed and deleted from social media.

Another video circulated around Chinese media depicting the recaptured Zhu looking weak and tired while being handcuffed by the police. Some were surprised Zhu could survive in the cold for 40 days (as winter temperatures in Northeast China can dip below freezing point). Some speculated Zhu escaped from prison to avoid being sent back to North Korea and executed. North Korean defectors such as Zhu could be subject to execution, sexual abuse, and torture when deported back to North Korea.

During the manhunt for Zhu, police accidentally captured another man who looked like Zhu five times. Social media remarked that Zhu's lookalike could finally be set free.

China's policy is usually to repatriate North Korean defectors as most are illegal migrants rather than refugees. As such, defectors like Zhu Xianjian can be treated as criminals and tried under China's judicial and legal system.
