= 2019 repatriation of North Koreans by South Korea =

On November 7, 2019, South Korea forcibly repatriated two North Korean fishermen suspected of killing 16 of their fellow fishermen. The pair attempted to defect to South Korea after arriving in the south on November 2, 2019. This was the first deportation of North Koreans by the South Korean Government since the 1953 Korean Armistice Agreement.

== Criticism ==
- According to the Constitution of South Korea, North Korean defectors also have South Korea nationality; therefore according to South Korean law, they should have the right to receive a fair trial.
- The South Korean Government received criticism for the deportation due to the lack of supporting evidence, which was based on just three days of investigation.
- The Minister of Unification (Kim Yeon-chul), Minister of National Defense (Jeong Kyeong-doo), and Director of National Intelligence Service (Suh Hoon) were charged with dereliction of duty, abuse of official authority, and aiding a murder by the prosecution on November 11, 2019 and later at the International Criminal Court.
- The South Korean branch of Amnesty International announced that South Korean Government's deportation was in violation of international human rights norms on November 11, 2019.
- Human Rights Watch announced that the South Korean Government's deportation was in disregard of International Prohibition Against Torture on November 12, 2019.
- Office of the United Nations High Commissioner for Human Rights stated that South Korean Government's deportation was illegal under international law.

== Investigation ==
Prosecutor's investigation was launched in 2022.

== See also ==
- Werner Weinhold
