= Choe Deok-geun =

South Korean diplomat (1942–1996)

Korean name
- Hangul: 최덕근
- Hanja: 崔德根
- RR: Choe Deokgeun
- MR: Ch'oe Tŏkkŭn

Choe Deok-geun (Korean: 최덕근; 2 November 1942 – 1 October 1996), also spelled Choi Duck-keun or Choi Duk-gun, was a South Korean consular official for the Russian Far East who was believed to have been assassinated by poison in October 1996.

== Biography ==
Choe was born in Songtan, Pyeongtaek, Gyeonggido, South Korea. He studied the Russian language at Hankuk University of Foreign Studies. In 1985, he passed the Korean civil service exam. In February of 1993, Choe was appointed to the Ukrainian embassy in Korea. By December 1995, he was dispatched to Vladivostok to be the Consulate General.

Vladivostok was a popular destination for North Koreans working for or fleeing their government. The DPRK had a consulate in nearby Nakhodka. Choe's diplomatic work officially involved him acting as a consul of arts and culture, though it was later reported he was investigating counterfeiting and drug trafficking by North Koreans.

== Assassination ==
Choe's body was discovered in the stairwell of an apartment complex housing other Korean nationals and diplomats. A few residents reported hearing a physical struggle, groans, and someone running away from the area. Blood was discovered from the 6th floor all the way down to the 3rd.

He had moved into this complex about 2 months prior. The complex was known to have lax security and issues with power outages. It is believed Choe was in the stairwell because the elevator power was out on that day.

The official cause of Choe's death was listed as bludgeoning, and he had damage to his skull; two pencil-sized holes on his torso suggested injection of a foreign substance into his body. The injection is believed to have contained neostigmine bromide. When his corpse was discovered, he still had $1,200 cash in his pocket.

It emerged soon after that he had poison in his bloodstream of the same type as that carried by a North Korean submarine which had infiltrated South Korean waters and landed near Gangneung, Gangwon the previous month; North Korea had threatened to retaliate for the killings of their special forces agents by the South Korean Army. North Korea denied all involvement and accused the South of fabricating evidence in order to frame the North. Some news reports at the time suggested that the North Koreans had hired a Russian Mafia hitman to actually carry out the murder.

Two or three assailants participated in the murder.

== Aftermath ==
Russia's two year long investigation concluded Choe was killed in an act of random violence. The South Korean government maintains its disagreement with this conclusion.

As a result of his death, South Korea's Ministry of Foreign Affairs and Trade allegedly instructed their personnel to refrain from contacting with or providing assistance to North Koreans in Russia, even refugees, for fear that they too could be murdered. Some analysts believe that the North Korean government chose to delay announcing their 24 August arrest and detention of American citizen Evan Hunziker until around the time of Choe's murder in an attempt to divert attention.

In 2011, the government requested Russia open a renewed investigation into the killing.

No murderer has ever been accused in Choe's death.
