= Ethnic Chinese in Mongolia =

Chinese Mongolians
Total population
- 40,000 (1987 est.); 2% of the Mongolian population

Regions with significant populations
- No data

Languages
- Chinese, Mongolian

Related ethnic groups
- Overseas Chinese

Chinese Mongolians can be subdivided into three groups: Mongolian citizens of ethnic Chinese background, temporary residents with Chinese citizenship, and permanent residents with Chinese citizenship. Mongolia's 1956 census counted ethnic Chinese as 1.9% of the population; the United States government estimated their proportion to be 2% in 1987, or roughly 40,000 people. The 2000 census showed 1,323 permanent residents of Chinese descent; this figure does not include naturalised citizens, temporary residents, nor illegal immigrants. Illegal immigrants from China were estimated at 10,000 in the 1990s; some use Mongolia as a transit point into Russia.

== Second Turkic Khaganate ==
Ethnic Chinese artists were hired by Bilge Khagan of the Second Turkic Khaganate. Chinese text on a silk piece of yellow color was found in a Turkic tomb.

== Liao dynasty ==
During the Liao dynasty, Han Chinese lived in Kedun, situated in present-day Mongolia. Chinese farmers migrated in. Many Han people migrated to cities located in modern-day Mongolia under Liao rule.

== Yuan dynasty ==
Ethnic Han officials were sent by the Yuan dynasty to the Lingbei Province (modern-day Mongolia and Siberia; 和宁路 益蘭州 謙州). The Yenisei area had a community of weavers of Han origin, and Samarkand and Outer Mongolia both had artisans of Han origin, as observed by Qiu Chuji.

== Ming dynasty ==
During the Ming dynasty, ethnic Chinese military frontiersmen in Liaodong were prone to mixing and acculturating with non-Han tribesmen.

Ethnic Chinese soldiers served in the Yuan army against the Ming, and the Mongols were joined by many Chinese defectors. The Mongol Mangui served in the Ming military and fought the Manchus, dying in battle against a Manchu raid. Some Chinese people who lived among the Mongols in Inner Mongolia, while in their youth, adopted Mongol culture and married Mongol women. A Han military officer who defected to the Mongols was "Monkey Li" (Li Huai) who fought against the Ming dynasty.

== Qing dynasty ==
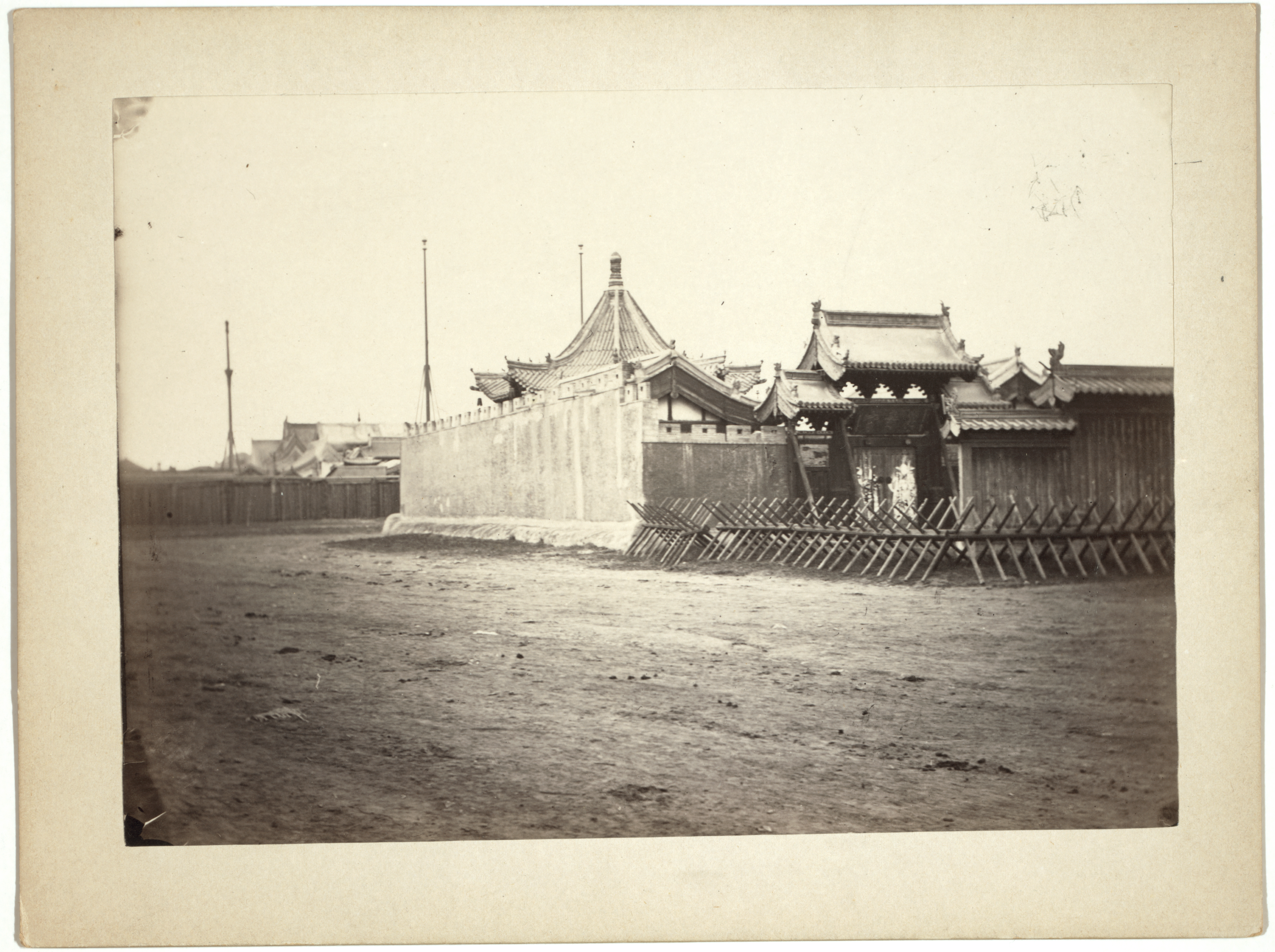
Chinese temple in Maimachin, 1885

Historically, the Gobi served as a barrier to large-scale Han settlement in what was, before 1921, called Outer Mongolia; the unsuitability of most of the territory for agriculture made settlement less attractive. Some Han settlements in Mongolia were founded in 1725, when farmers moved there by decree of the Qing dynasty to cultivate food for soldiers fighting against the Dzungars. They were established in the Orkhon and Tuul river basins, and in 1762, in the Khovd region. After the fighting ended, the Qing closed off Mongolia (then under Qing rule) to immigration and occasionally evicted Han merchants.

Despite those restrictions, trade firms owned by Han people continually penetrated Mongolia, concentrating mainly in Ikh Khüree, Uliastai, Khovd and Kyakhta. Their trade practices and the lifestyle of the Mongol nobility lead to an ever-increasing indebtedness of the banners, nobles, and ordinary people, and Han-owned businesses became a target of public discontent as early as Chingünjav's uprising in 1756. The spill-over from the Dungan rebellions of the 1870s into Mongolia also saw a number of Han-owned businesses in Khovd and Uliastai destroyed. Many of the ethnic Han merchants lived in Mongolia only seasonally or until they had made enough money to return to China proper. Others took Mongol wives, at least for the time of being in Mongolia.

In 1906, the Qing dynasty began to implement policies aimed at Chinese colonization of Outer Mongolia along the lines of those in Inner Mongolia, but these policies never took full effect as a result of the Xinhai Revolution and the Mongolian declaration of independence from China. The total Han population at that time, mainly consisting of traders and artisans, but also of some colonists, can be estimated to have been at some ten thousand.

== Since 1911 ==
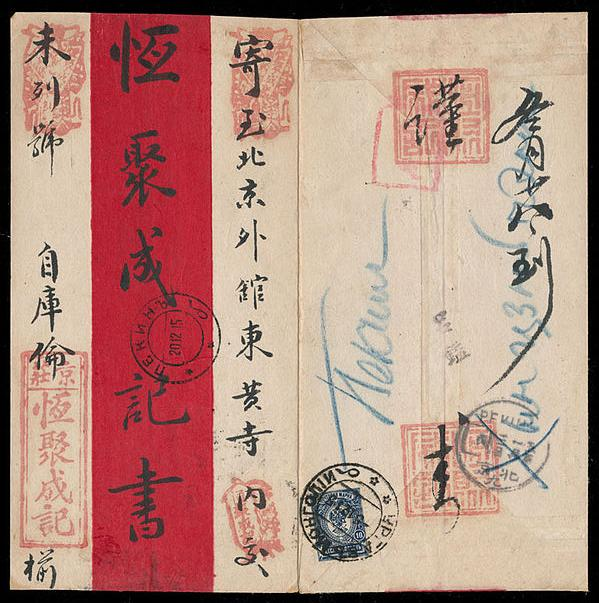
A 1915 cover, red band from Urga to Beijing, written by Chinese merchant.

Upon Mongolia's declaration of independence, many Chinese became victims of atrocities, particularly in Khovd. However, after 1912, Chinese businesses were able to continue their operations, including collection of debts, largely unimpeded. It was only the establishment of communism that meant an end to Chinese trade in Mongolia. Ever-increasing obstacles to commerce were created, and the closure of the border to China for imports in 1928 meant an end for Chinese enterprise in the country.

With the People's Republic of China development aid projects of the 1950s, many Han Chinese entered Mongolia, beginning in 1955. By 1961, they had reached a number of 20,000. However, after the Sino-Soviet split in the early 1960s, in which Mongolia sided with the Soviets, China eventually withdrew most of its workers. At the same time, Mongolian politicians or academicians with alleged links to China (e.g. Ts. Lookhuuz or G. Sükhbaatar) became victims of political purges. In the early 1980s, Ulan Bator was reported to have a small Chinese community, which published a Chinese-language newspaper and which looked to the Chinese embassy there for moral support. However, in 1983, Mongolia systematically began expelling some of the remaining 7,000 Chinese contract workers in Mongolia to China. At the same time, ethnic Chinese who had become naturalized citizens were reported to be unaffected. Because the presence and the status of Chinese residents in Mongolia were politically sensitive subjects, Mongolian sources usually avoided mentioning the Chinese at all.

After the introduction of democracy, another wave of Chinese immigrants has entered the country. Many of the migrants work in the construction sector, while others run small or medium enterprises. Negative sentiment against Chinese migrants remains; China is seen as a potential threat to Mongolia's security and cultural identity. However, not all recent immigrants from China are ethnic Han Chinese; in particular, there are a number of Mongolian Chinese.

== See also ==
- Demographics of Mongolia
- Koreans in Mongolia
