= Masaji Ishikawa =

North Korean defector (born 1947)

- 石川昌司
- Born: Do Chang-sun; 1947 (age 78–79); Kawasaki
- Known for: Defection from North Korea
- Writing career
- Children: 3
- Pen name: Shunsuke Miyazaki (宮崎 俊輔)

Korean name
- Hangul: 도창순
- Hanja: 都昌巡
- RR: Do Changsun
- MR: To Ch'angsun

Masaji Ishikawa or Do Changsun is a North Korean defector and author on Zainichi heritage. Ishikawa was thirteen years old when he moved from Japan to North Korea in 1960. His father was Zainichi Korean and his mother was Japanese. Ishikawa later defected from North Korea in 1996 via the Yalu River, leaving behind three children and a spouse. The Japanese government assisted him in leaving China. In 2003, he was working as a security guard.

== Memoir ==
In 2000, Ishikawa published his memoirs in Japan under the title 北朝鮮大脱出地獄からの生還 and the nom de plume Shunsuke Miyazaki (宮崎 俊輔). They were translated into English in 2017 under the title A River in Darkness. Ishikawa's memoirs are published in Korean under his Korean name (Note: In the English language version of A River in Darkness this name is romanised as "Do Chan-sun" which does not match the hangul used by the Korean publisher; presumably the English translation is romanised from the Japanese ド・チャンスン instead) and the title 역사의 증언자. The book was translated into Persian in 2020. The part of the book focused on the river crossing was published in Literary Hub.

== See Also ==
- North Korean Defectors
- Koreans in Japan
- Chongryon
