= Koreans in Mongolia =

Ethnic group

Total population
- 2,284 South Koreans (2013); 200 North Koreans (2008); Plus an unknown number of North Korean defectors

Regions with significant populations
- Ulaanbaatar

Languages
- Korean, Mongolian

Related ethnic groups
- Korean diaspora

Koreans in Mongolia form one of the Korean diaspora communities in Asia. They consist of both North and South Korean expatriates.

== South Koreans ==
=== Population and business activities ===
In 1994, there were estimated to be around 100 South Korean expatriates in Mongolia. Official statistics from South Korea's Ministry of Foreign Affairs and Trade showed 270 of their nationals in Mongolia in 1997, and about eight times as many by 2013. Some unofficial estimates suggest that their population might be as large as 3,500 individuals. Aside from residents, the number of South Korean tourists has also shown an upward trend, reaching 40,000 individuals in 2007.

Many South Korean expatriates operate small businesses; the number of businesses in Mongolia funded by South Korean capital was estimated at 1,500 as of 2008. The various types of businesses include restaurants serving Korean cuisine, karaoke bars, and even eyeglass shops. A weekend language and culture school for Korean children was set up in 1998 by a local Korean church. Under a bilateral agreement, both South Koreans working in Mongolia as well as Mongolians working in South Korea are exempted from otherwise-mandatory contributions to the national pension plans of the country they reside in.

=== Ethnic tensions ===
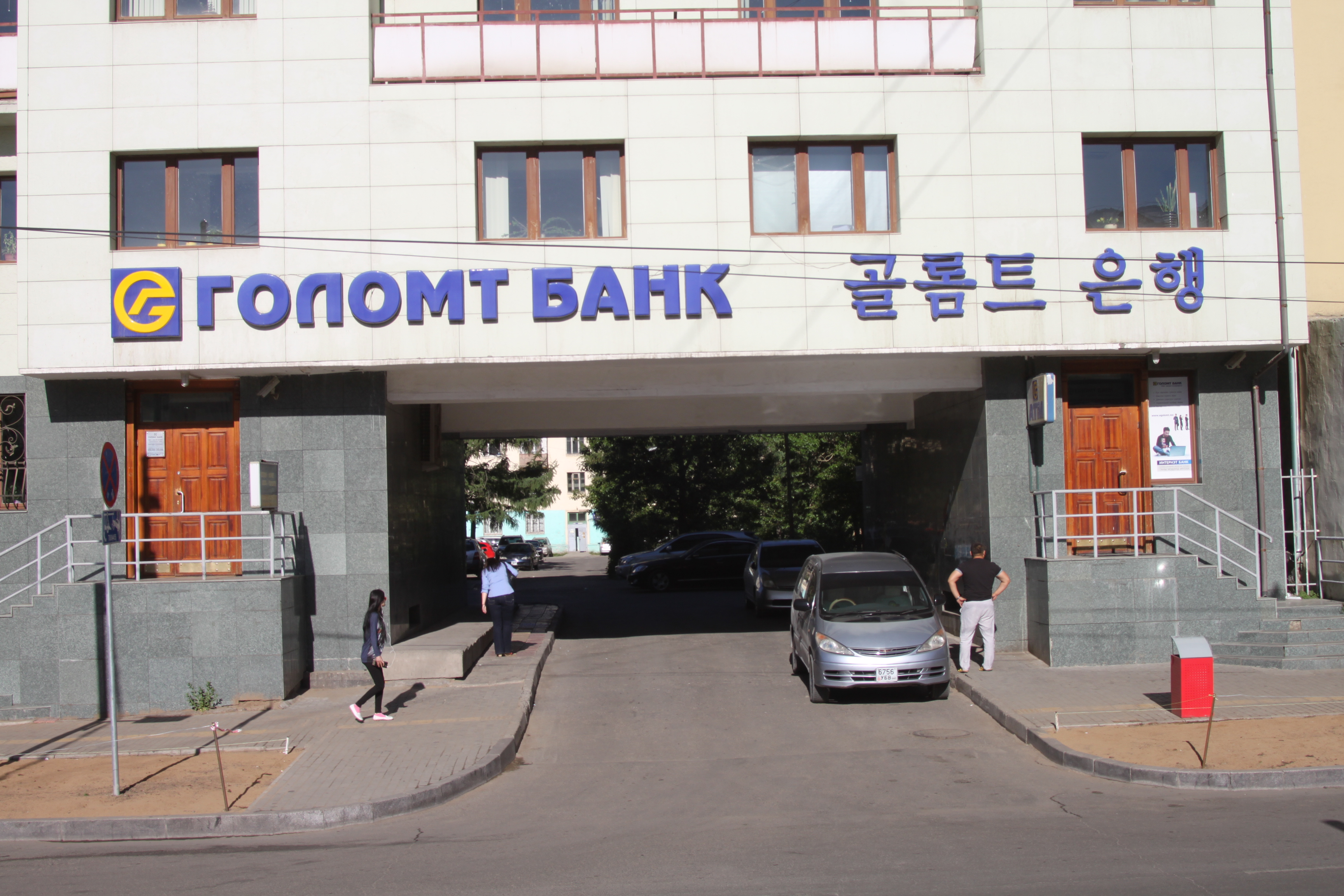
Golomt Bank branch in central Ulaanbaatar which used to use signage in Korean

The growth of the South Korean presence has caused some tensions with their Mongolian hosts. In 2005, Korean-owned businesses in Ulaanbaatar which displayed hangul signs were ordered to switch them to English or Mongolian only, a situation which South Korean news agency YTN attributed to growing Mongolian nationalism.

Among the numerous South Korean owned businesses are a number of karaoke bars operating as fronts for prostitution, which are frequented by clients of South Korean-run businesses in Mongolia (growing from just one in 2002 to an estimated fifty as of 2005).

== North Koreans ==
=== Migrant workers ===
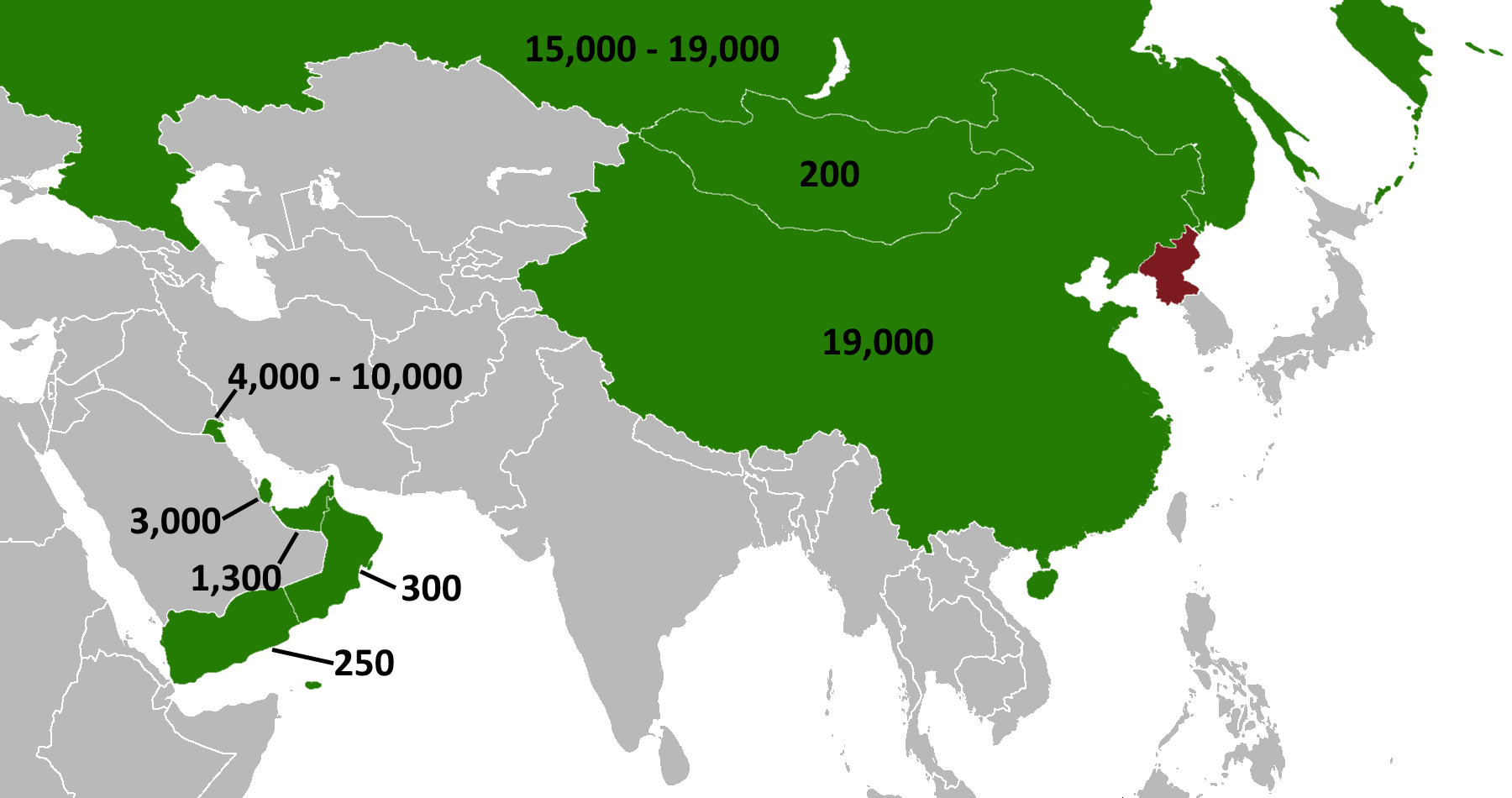
Number of North Korean migrant workers in Asia

As of May 2008, roughly 200 North Korean citizens worked in Mongolia. In February 2008, Ulaanbaatar and Pyongyang reached an agreement which would allow as many as 5,300 North Korean workers to come to Mongolia over the following five years. The relevant agreement came before the State Great Hural for approval in May that year. An open letter from American NGO Human Rights Watch in August called on Mongolian Minister of Social Welfare and Labor Damdiny Demberel to ensure that the workers' freedom of expression, movement, and association would be respected; North Korean workers in similar positions in Europe were often denied such rights by their North Korean government minders. The South Korean ambassador described Mongolia's decision to import North Korean workers as "problematic".

=== Defectors ===
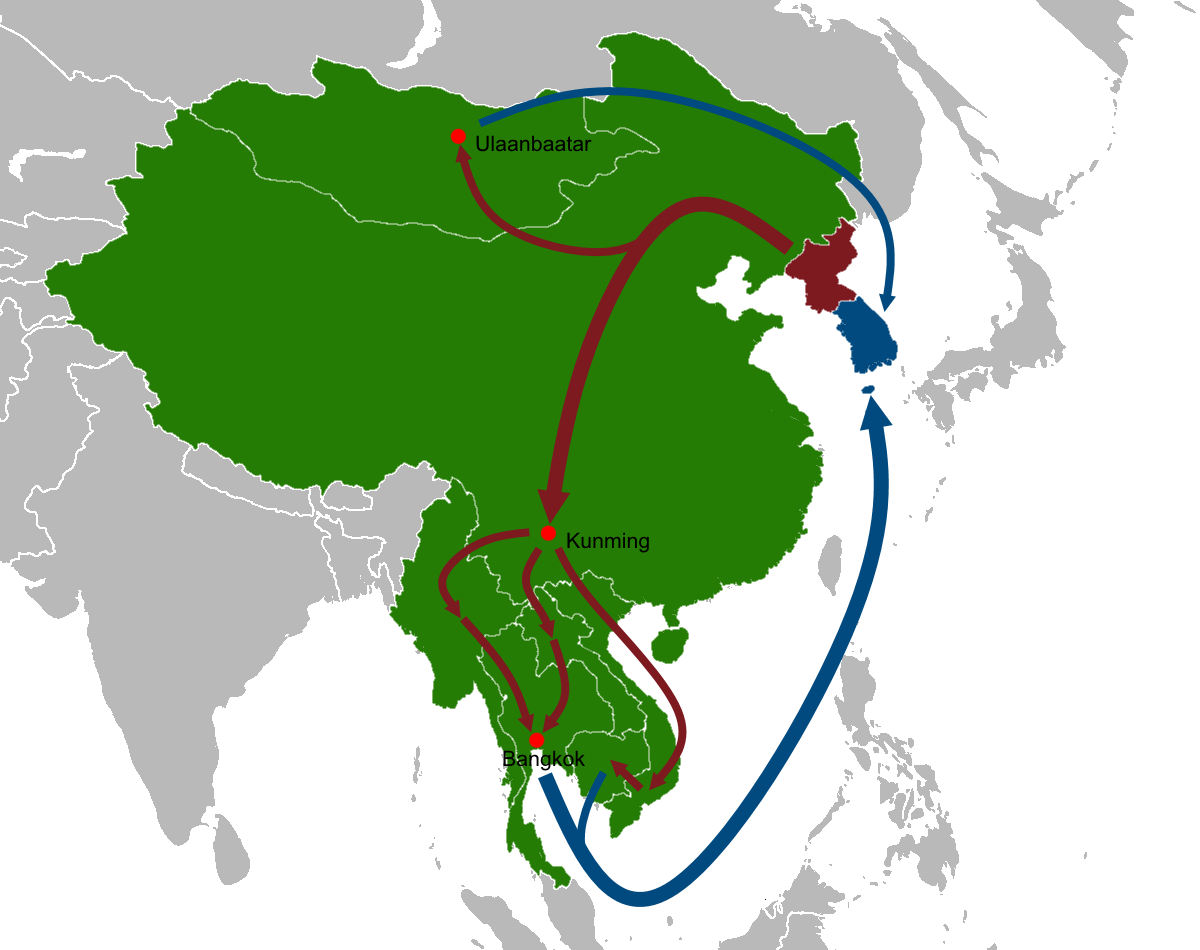
North Korean defectors often pass through Mongolia on their way to South Korea.

As of 2006, it was estimated that 500 North Korean defectors entered Mongolia each month, largely by way of neighbouring China.

As early as 2004, some South Korean citizens' groups had begun laying plans to construct camps in Mongolia to house North Korean refugees; however, they were denied permission by the Mongolian government. In September 2005, South Korean NGO Rainbow Foundation stated that they had been granted 1.3 square kilometres of land near Ulaanbaatar, and would soon begin construction on a centre which could house as many as 200 North Korean refugees However, during his November 2006 trip to Beijing, Mongolian prime minister Miyeegombyn Enkhbold denied reports that his country was planning to set up any refugee camps for North Koreans, though he reaffirmed that they would be treated in a humanitarian manner. In October 2008, South Korean president Lee Myung-bak was reported to have ordered his officials to look further into the possibility of setting up a camp for them in Mongolia.

The Mongolian government does have facilities to provide shelter for North Korean refugees on their territory; in December 2007, Vitit Muntarbhorn, the United Nations Special Rapporteur on Human Rights in North Korea, praised Mongolia's treatment of North Korean refugees in an official report, noting that they had made commendable progress in improving such facilities since his previous visit.

Both the Mongolian and South Korean governments' policies towards refugees have shifted several times. In June 2007, Mongolia began to turn North Korean refugees away from their borders, reportedly with the aim of improving their diplomatic relations with North Korea. Similarly, in October 2007, the South Korean side was reported to be "closing the door" to North Korean refugees in Mongolia and Southeast Asia; North Korea watcher Andrei Lankov, a professor at Seoul's Kookmin University, attributed this to a deliberate policy by the South Korean government to minimise the number of new refugees.

== See also ==
- Ethnic Chinese in Mongolia
