= North Koreans in Russia =

Ethnic group

Total population
- 34,217 (2015)

Regions with significant populations
- Russian Far East

Languages
- Korean, Russian

Related ethnic groups
- Koryo-saram

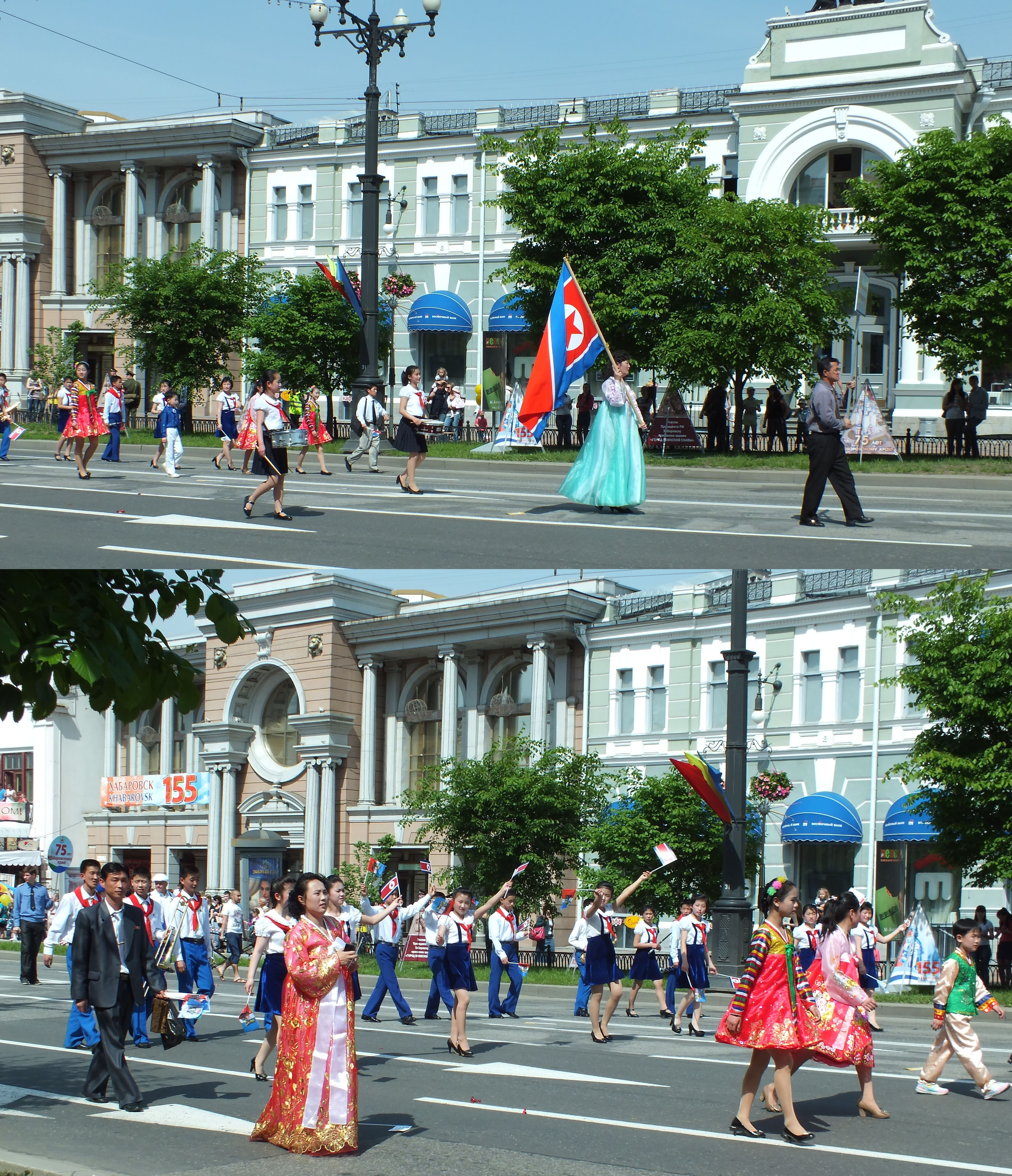
DPRK citizens at the festive procession dedicated to the 155th anniversary of Khabarovsk

North Koreans in Russia consist mainly of three groups: international students, guest workers, and defectors and refugees. A 2006 study by Kyung Hee University estimated their total population at roughly 10,000. Most of them exist as monolithic communities, more difficult to act alone and their discipline is strict. Following the outbreak of the war in Ukraine, a significant number of North Koreans have been observed secretly entering Russia to undertake various jobs, supplementing the labor force and exchanging technical expertise.

Aside from North Korean citizens living in Russia, there has also historically been significant migration from the northern provinces of Korea, especially Hamgyong, to the Russian Far East; this population of migrants became known as the Koryo-saram. 65% of the Sakhalin Koreans also took up North Korean citizenship in the 1950s and 1960s in order to avoid statelessness; roughly one thousand even repatriated to North Korea, though their ancestral homes were in the southern half of the Korean Peninsula. In addition, various senior members of the Workers' Party of Korea, including Kim Il Sung himself, lived in Russia prior to Korean independence and the establishment of North Korea.

== Migration history ==
=== Students ===
During the post-Korean War reconstruction period of North Korea from 1953 to 1962, many North Korean students enrolled in universities and colleges in countries of the Soviet bloc, including Russia, and others came as industrial trainees.

=== Workers ===
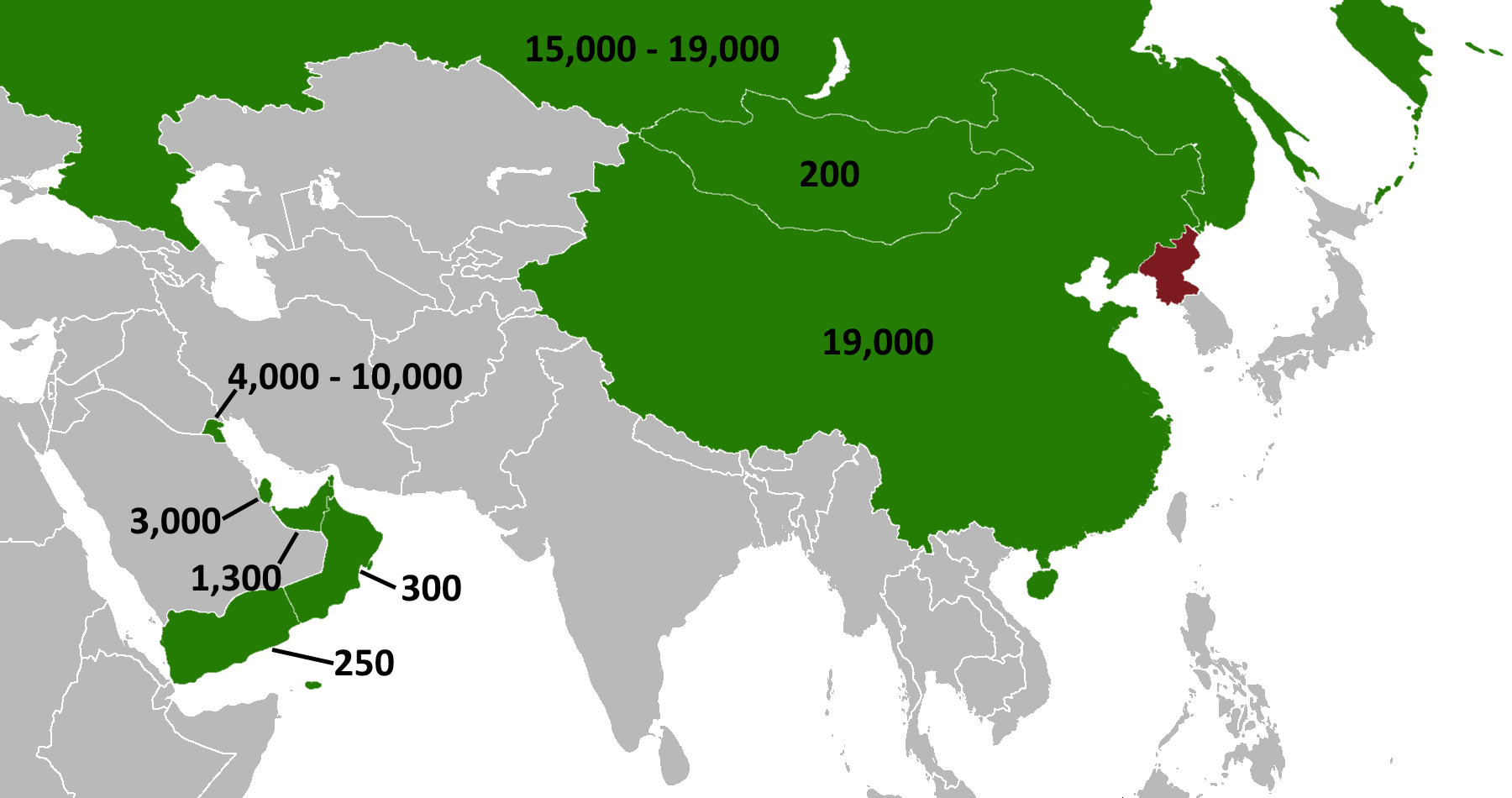
Number of North Korean migrant workers in Asia

In the late 1940s, roughly 9,000 North Korean migrant workers were recruited by the Soviet government to work in state-owned fisheries on Sakhalin. Between 1946 and 1949, one researcher estimated that 50,000 North Koreans went to the Kamchatka Peninsula. Several thousand Kamchatka Koreans refused repatriation orders, which created a community that exists to this day.

Another 25,000 workers also came to work in fisheries during the 1950s. The second wave began in 1966 or 1967 under a secret agreement between Leonid Brezhnev and Kim Il Sung in Vladivostok, which involved North Koreans working as lumberjacks. Roughly 15,000 to 20,000 were present in any given year. The first two waves consisted mostly of criminals or political prisoners.

However, the most recent influx of North Korean workers, which began under the government of Vladimir Putin, is composed of volunteers seeking to escape unemployment and poverty at home. Most are from Pyongyang; recruitment companies prefer workers from urban areas, as they are believed to adapt better to life in other countries. By 2006, more than 10,000 North Koreans entered Russia on work visas annually, largely headed for the Russian Far East. Cities such as Tynda house North Korean camps and offices that oversee operations across a wider area in the Russian Far East. They are closely monitored by North Korean security forces to prevent defections; many report being paid in scrip rather than legal currency. Special dormitories are built for North Koreans residing in these camps, with many featuring facilities such as study rooms for North Korean lectures, and areas laden with North Korean propaganda. A 2011 multi-part documentary filmed by Vice News in partnership with Simon Ostrovsky corroborated these claims.

In 2009, the North Korean government was estimated to earn roughly US$7 million each year in foreign exchange through their workers in Russia. In 2010, reports came out from Nakhodka indicating that North Korean workers and traders there had been evacuated back to their home country due to rising military tensions with South Korea. In 2011, Kim Jong Il made a visit to Russia in which he reportedly negotiated for even more North Korean workers to be sent to Russia. Up to 70% of the $40 to $100 per month wages earned by the workers are reported to be taken away as "loyalty payments".

=== Soldiers ===
It is known that in late 2024, North Korea made an offer to the Russians to send troops to the Far East of Russia for military training, to eventually be sent to the frontlines of the Russian invasion of Ukraine. By late 2024, videos emerged showing North Korean troops in Siberia training with Russian troops, and South Korea and various other intelligence agencies determined that North Korea had sent troops to Russia. These actions were condemned by NATO, the EU, South Korea, and the United States. It is estimated that North Korea dispatched between 10,000-12,000 troops according to Ukrainian, South Korean, and US intelligence. These soldiers eventually ended up on the frontlines of the Russo-Ukrainian War, serving in Kursk to counter the Ukrainian incursion of the Kursk Oblast. Ukraine first noted inflicting casualties on the North Koreans in late 2024. North Korea denied having sent troops to aid the Russians, and have not responded to calls from Ukraine and other countries to withdraw. In 2025, Ukraine captured 2 soldiers from North Korea, confirming that North Korea had sent troops to aid the Russians.

== Refugees ==
The decline of the economy of North Korea has also resulted in an increasing number of North Korean refugees in Russia, also in the eastern regions. Many of these refugees are runaways from the North Korean logging camps. Years ago, both South Korean diplomatic missions and local ethnic Koreans were reluctant to provide them with any assistance. As early as 1994, the South Korean prime minister was quoted as stating "It is legally not tidy for us to grant North Koreans asylum". However, the present sentiment in the region is not well analyzed, despite South Korea's willingness to take in North Koreans in the modern day.

It is believed that North Korea ordered the assassination of South Korean consul Choi Duk-gun in 1996 as well as two private citizens in 1995, in response to their contact with the refugees. In 1999, there were estimated to be only between 100 and 500 North Korean refugees in the area. However, their numbers grew rapidly. In 2003, Sergey Darkin, the Governor of Primorsky Krai, suggested allowing up to 150,000 North Korean refugees in China to settle in Russia, but his plan never came to fruition. In November 2007, Russian law enforcement abducted a North Korean asylum seeker in front of a Federal Migration Service office in Moscow, which turned him over to agents of the North Korean special services. The refugee later escaped from a facility in Vladivostok, and intervention by the NGO Civic Assistance and UNHCR prevented his deportation.

== See also ==
- North Korea–Russia relations
- Korean diaspora
