= Koreans in Kamchatka =

Ethnic group in the Russian Far East

Kamchatka Krai, highlighted in orange

There is a population of North Koreans in Russia on the Kamchatka Peninsula. The largest concentration of Koreans currently lives in Yelizovo.

The population first came to the area as contract workers from 1946 to 1949. According to one estimate, during that time period, 50,000 North Korean workers arrived. They mostly left upon the conclusion of their contracts. However, several thousand refused to repatriate back to North Korea. By 2020, their population was around 1,800, making them 0.43% to 0.49% of the total population of the peninsula. By that year, almost all of the original settlers had died out, and the remaining Koreans were second- or third-generation.

Since the late 1980s, the population has aligned itself more with South Korea. This is mainly due to South Korea's stronger economy and democracy. Many have since visited and worked in the South.

== History ==
In 1946, the Soviet Union and North Korea concluded an agreement to collaborate on the development of fisheries. By the terms of the agreement, 2,000 North Korean migrant workers would go to various parts of the Russian Far East, including Sakhalin and Kamchatka, from May to July of that year. Another 2,200 followed in 1947. Workers worked on contracts of various lengths, from several months to several years.

Exactly how many North Koreans went to Kamchatka is not known. One survey published in 2020 estimated their number to have been 50,000 between 1946 and 1949. The SS Zyrianin had a record of 2,200 North Korean workers going to Petropavlovsk-Kamchatsky from North Korea in 1947. They came from various parts of North Korea; 700 were from Myongchon, 1,000 from Kilju, 875 from Toksong, and 415 from Hyesan.

Working conditions were difficult. In 1947, 300 Koreans died due to an epidemic. Others died from the cold or from starvation.

In 1948, the population of North Korean workers in Kamchatka was 9,081. Most of them worked in various fisheries along the coasts, on labor contracts of up to three years. Upon the conclusion of their contracts, they were ordered to return home. However, some refused, possibly due to apprehension over returning to the poverty in North Korea. When ships came to repatriate them, they fled into the mountains.

Official sources gave the Korean population as 6,740 (3.05% of total) in 1959, 1,952 (0.41%) in 1989, 1,749 (0.49%) in 2002, and 1,401 (0.43%) in 2010.

=== Shifting identity ===
According to later interviews, when they first arrived, they were looked down upon by native residents and discriminated against.

Upon arrival at Kamchatka from North Korea, we were discriminated against harshly. We were asked to go back to the "land of Kim Il Sung". We were asked to sell "Kim Il Sung vegetables" cultivated in Kamchatka. Russians here treated North Korean workers with contempt because we came to Kamchatka to live on Russian bread. Following the contemptuous conducts of their parents, Russian children also made fun of us.

Koreans in Kamchatka visited and associated themselves with North Korea until at latest the late 1980s. An interviewer estimated that original residents visited North Korea an average of three times. However, as North Korea became more closed off and South Korea democratized and became economically successful, they began to associate themselves with (and visit) the South more. One interviewee said:

In the late 1980s, however, [locals] stopped making fun of us and began treating us with respect, for the reason that [South Korea], our motherland, is well off. The 1988 Summer Olympics, which [Soviet athletes participated in], served as a turning point for them to recognize the miraculous economic situation of South Korea. Since then, Russians no longer laughed at us in scorn.

One original immigrant (born in 1928, moved to Kamchatka in 1949) said of this in a 2016 interview:

These days we do not visit North Korea since we no longer have living relatives there. However, I have been to South Korea recently. We had good experiences in South Korea, although we were born in North Korea. My relationship with South Korea is more intimate. It also might be due to the fact that my granddaughters are now living in Busan.

The highest density of ethnic Koreans in Kamchatka now live in Yelizovo. The total population of Koreans in Kamchatka was estimated to be around 1,800 by one researcher in 2020. The population had been intermarrying into the community by the 1990s.

== Coverage ==
A documentary film entitled Where Is Your Homeland? (Korean: 고향이 어디세요?) about the population was released in November 2017.

A book about the population was written by Nikolai Bugay and published on November 20, 2019.
