= Mongolia–North Korea relations =

- Mongolia: North Korea

Mongolia–North Korea relations (Mongolian: Монгол, БНАСАУ-ын харилцаа, Korean: 몽골-조선민주주의인민공화국 관계) are the historic and current bilateral relations between Mongolia and the Democratic People's Republic of Korea (North Korea). Despite Mongolia's good relations with South Korea, their cooperation with the North have been cordial nonetheless.

== History ==
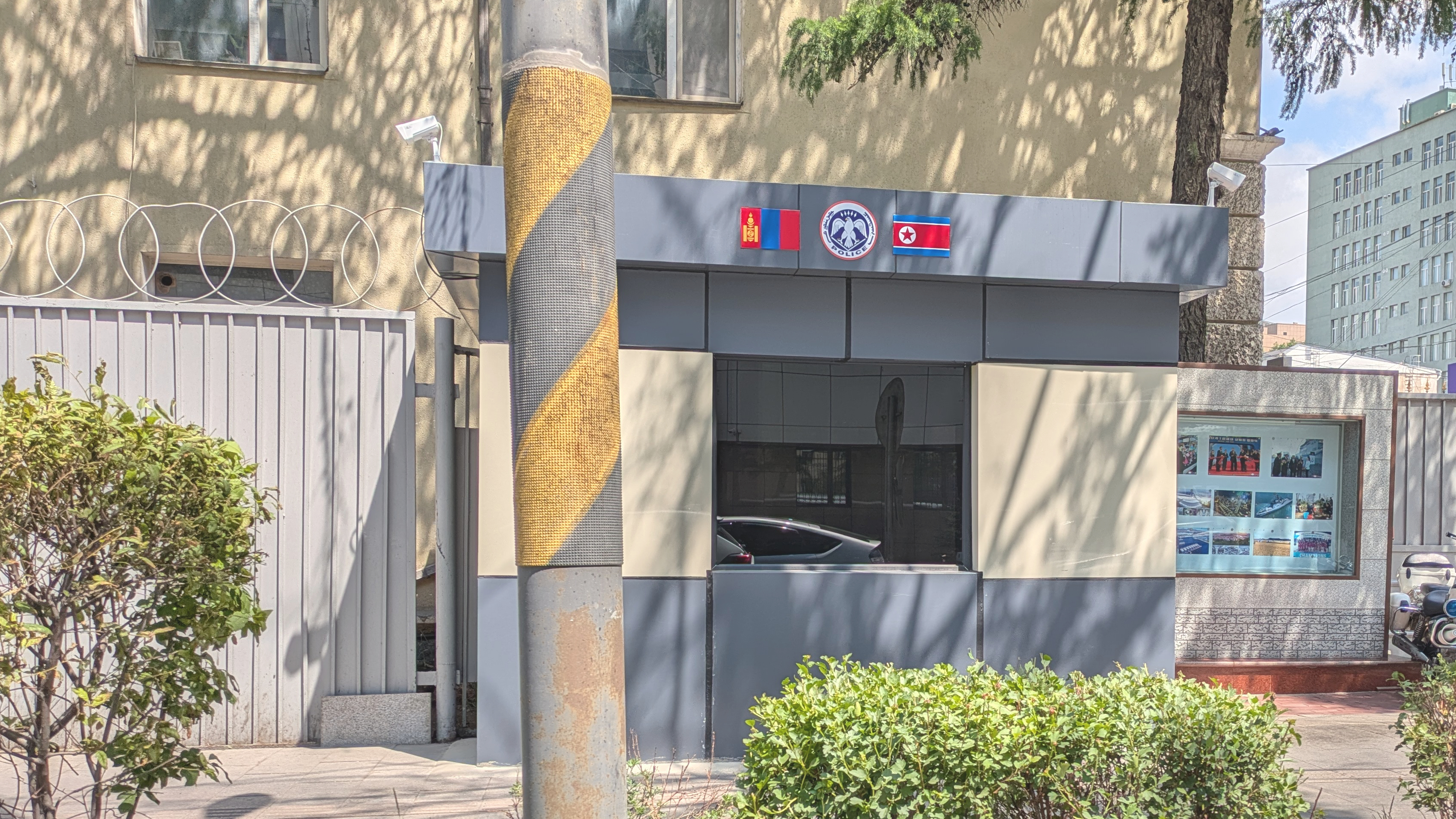
North Korean embassy in Ulaanbaatar

=== Early relationship and Korean War ===
The two countries established diplomatic relations on October 15, 1948. The Mongolian People's Republic was the second country to recognize North Korea after the Soviet Union. Mongolia provided assistance to North Korea during the Korean War, although it did not directly participate. In 1952, during the Korean War, North Korea sent 200 war orphans to Mongolia. Today in Ulaanbaatar, there are remnants of a two-story "North Korean War Orphanage" building remains. Mongolia also contributed to the post-war reconstruction of the DPRK. On the basis of an aid agreement signed at the end of 1953, the Mongolian government sent 10,000 horses to North Korea. After the war, Mongolia received and brought up more than 400 war-orphaned children in 1960–1970s.

=== Cold War ===
From 1960 to the mid-1980s, the Sino-Soviet split – in which Mongolia adopted a consistently pro-Soviet stance, whereas the DPRK's standpoint was usually closer to the Chinese position than to the Soviet one – considerably hindered Mongolian-North Korean cooperation. On several occasions, these disagreements led to various forms of low-intensity friction in Mongolian-DPRK relations. Thanks to the post-1982 improvement of Sino-Soviet relations, in 1986 Mongolia and North Korea signed their first friendship and cooperation treaty. Kim Il Sung also paid a visit to the country in 1988.

=== Post-1990 ===
After the collapse of the Communist regime in Mongolia, relations became strained. The two countries nullified their earlier friendship and cooperation treaty in 1995, and in 1999, North Korea shut down their embassy in Ulaanbaatar on the occasion of an official visit from Kim Dae-jung, the first such visit by a South Korean president. Mongolia had previously expelled two North Korean diplomats for attempting to pass counterfeit United States one-hundred dollar bills. Subsequently, Mongolia began to intensify its policy of engagement with North Korea, with the aim of improving relations. In 2002, Paek Nam Sun became the first North Korean foreign minister to visit Mongolia in 14 years. The most recent high-level visit occurred in July 2007, when Kim Yong-nam, Chairman of the Presidium of the Supreme People's Assembly, made his third visit to the country; he had previously made two trips to Mongolia, in 1985 and 1988.

Unofficially, North Korean visitors show significant interest in studying Mongolia's economic reforms; according to the Mongolian side, North Koreans see them as non-threatening because they are a fellow non-Western country and went through similar experiences under communism. Mongolia's efforts to introduce free-market capitalism to North Korea also have a component of self-interest. The Trans-Siberian Railway, an essential link in the potential continuous rail transit route from South Korea to Europe, passes through Mongolia; North Korean economic liberalisation which allowed South Korean shipping to pass through its borders would remove the major stumbling block to such a route, providing economic benefits for Mongolia.

North Korean refugees are a delicate issue between the two governments. In 2005, South Korean charity groups received from the Mongolian government an allocation of 1.3 square kilometres of land at an unspecified location 40 kilometres outside of Ulan Bator to establish a refugee camp. However, as of November 2006, Miyeegombyn Enkhbold, Mongolia's prime minister, officially denied the existence of such camps. One scholar estimated that 500 North Korean refugees enter Mongolia each month, along with some legal migrant labourers who come under an inter-governmental agreement to work in light industry and infrastructure projects.

In 2013, the Mongolian President Tsakhiagiin Elbegdorj visited North Korea, and the two countries expanded economic ties, particularly with regard to oil refining. In October 2018, North Korean Chairman Kim Jong Un received an official invitation to pay a visit to Mongolia by President Khaltmaagiin Battulga.

== Inter-nation visits ==
=== Heads of State and Government ===
Guest	Host	Place of visit	Date of visit
(Mongolian People's Republic) Chairman Yumjaagiin Tsedenbal	(North Korea) Premier Kim Il Sung	Pyongyang	1956
(North Korea) Premier Kim Il Sung	(Mongolian People's Republic) Chairman Yumjaagiin Tsedenbal	Ulaanbaatar	16-18 July 1956
(North Korea) Chairman Kim Yong-nam	(Mongolian People's Republic) Chairman Jambyn Batmönkh	Ulaanbaatar	1985
(Mongolian People's Republic) Chairman Jambyn Batmönkh	(North Korea) President Kim Il Sung	Pyongyang	1986
(North Korea) President Kim Il Sung	(Mongolian People's Republic) Chairman Jambyn Batmönkh	Ulaanbaatar	1988
(North Korea) Chairman Kim Yong-nam	(Mongolian People's Republic) Chairman Jambyn Batmönkh	Ulaanbaatar	1985
(Mongolia) Prime Minister Rinchinnyamyn Amarjargal	(North Korea) General Secretary Kim Jong Il	Pyongyang	1999
(Mongolia) Prime Minister Nambaryn Enkhbayar	(North Korea) General Secretary Kim Jong Il	Pyongyang	2003
(Mongolia) President Natsagiin Bagabandi	(North Korea) General Secretary Kim Jong Il	Pyongyang	2004
(Mongolia) President Tsakhiagiin Elbegdorj	(North Korea) Chairman Kim Yong-nam	Pyongyang	2013

=== Lower ranking officials ===
Guest	Host	Place of visit	Date of visit	Description of visit
(North Korea) Deputy Premier Jeong Jun-taek	(Mongolian People's Republic) Chairman Yumjaagiin Tsedenbal	Ulaanbaatar	14 July 1971	Visit during the celebrations of the 50th anniversary of the People's Revolution.
(North Korea) Foreign Minister Ho Dam	(Mongolian People's Republic) Chairman Yumjaagiin Tsedenbal	Ulaanbaatar	1973	
(Mongolian People's Republic) Foreign Minister Lodongiyn Rinchin	(North Korea) Member of the WPK Politburo Kim Jong Il	Pyongyang	21 December 1974	
(Mongolian People's Republic) Foreign Minister Tserenpiliyn Gombosüren	(North Korea) Member of the Presidium of the WPK Politburo Kim Jong Il	Pyongyang	1989	

== Diplomatic missions ==
=== North Korean ambassadors to Mongolia ===
- Hong Gyu (2013–2017)
- O Sung Ho (2017–)

=== Mongolian ambassadors to North Korea ===
- Jamsran Sambuu (1950–1952)
- Batyn Dorj (1961–1963)
- Sharavyn Gungaadorj (1992–1997)
- Janchivdorjyn Lomvo (2001–2008)
- Sodovjamts Khurelbaatar (2008–2011)
- Manibadrakh Ganbold (2012–2016)
- Surengiin Tsoggerel (2016–)

== See also ==
- Mongol invasions of Korea
- Mongolia–South Korea relations
