= Mongolia–South Korea relations =

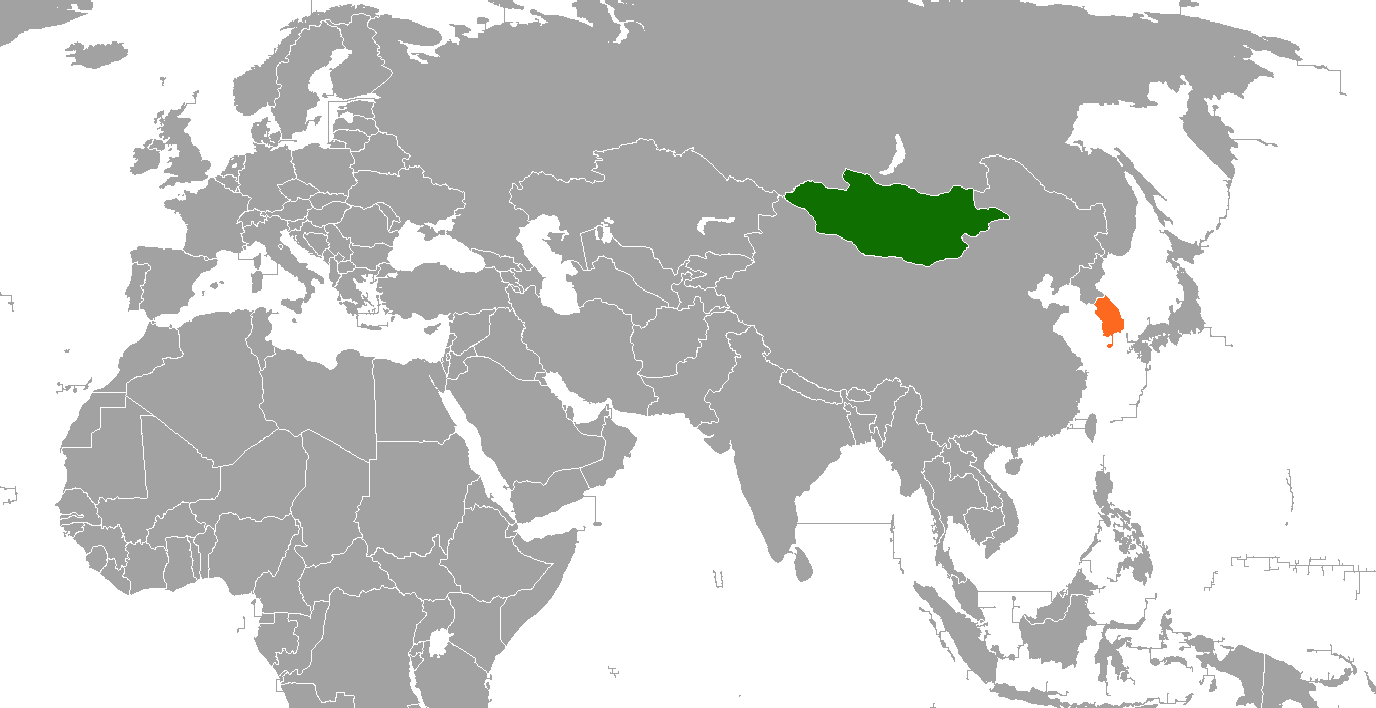

- Mongolia: South Korea

Diplomatic mission
- Embassy of Mongolia, Seoul: Embassy of the Republic of Korea, Ulaanbaatar

Envoy
- Ambassador Erdenetsogtyn Sarantogos: Ambassador Kim Jong-goo

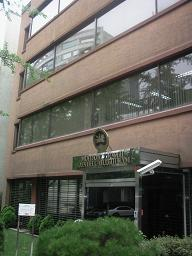
Mongolian embassy in Seoul, South Korea.

Mongolia–South Korea relations (Mongolian: Монгол, Өмнөд Солонгосын харилцаа, Korean: 대한민국-몽골 관계) are foreign relations between South Korea and the Mongolia. South Korea has an embassy in Ulaanbaatar. Mongolia has an embassy in Seoul.

== History ==
Both countries established diplomatic relations on 26 March 1990.

=== High-level visits ===
- May 1999: President Kim Dae-jung made the first ever state visit by a South Korean president to Mongolia, focusing on establishing foundational diplomatic ties and opening up early economic partnerships.
- May 2006: President Roh Moo-hyun visited Ulaanbaatar to expand economic ties by signing bilateral agreements regarding natural resources, information technology, and labor cooperation.
- August 2011: President Lee Myung-bak visited to upgrade the relationship to a “comprehensive partnership" that focuses on joint energy and infrastructure development.
- July 2016: President Park Geun-hye attended the 11th Asia-Europe Meeting (ASEM) in Ulaanbaatar and held side talks on regional trade.
- July 2026: President Lee Jae-myung made the first standalone state visit in 15 years to sign agreements on critical mineral supply chains and trade, while also attending the Naadam Festival as a guest of honor.

== Description ==
Mongolians in South Korea form the largest population of Mongolian citizens abroad. Their numbers were estimated at 33,000 as of 2008. In 2008, there were around 3,500 South Koreans in Mongolia. Under a bilateral agreement signed in 2006, citizens of each country residing in the other are exempted from otherwise-mandatory contributions to the national pension plans of the country they reside in.

In 2024, it was reported that around one in ten Mongolians had experience working in South Korea, and that a significant number of Mongolians could speak Korean.

=== Economic cooperations ===
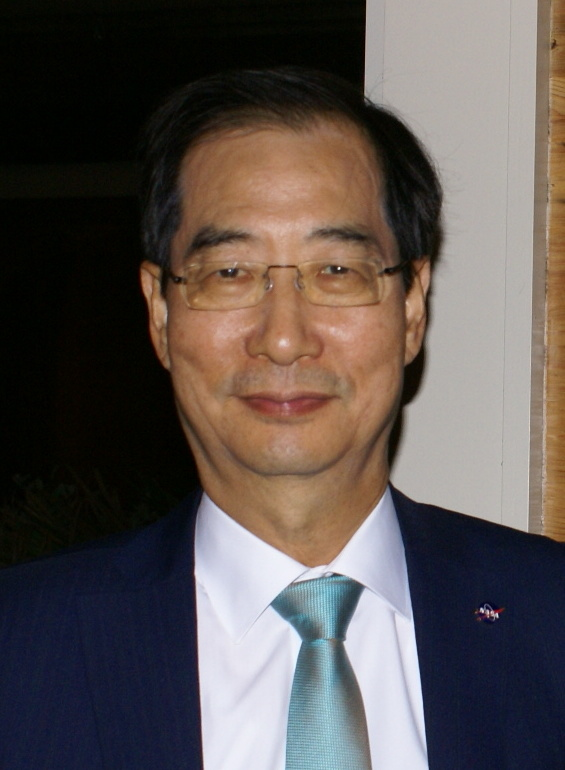
Former Prime Minister of South Korea, Han Duck-soo (2022-2025)

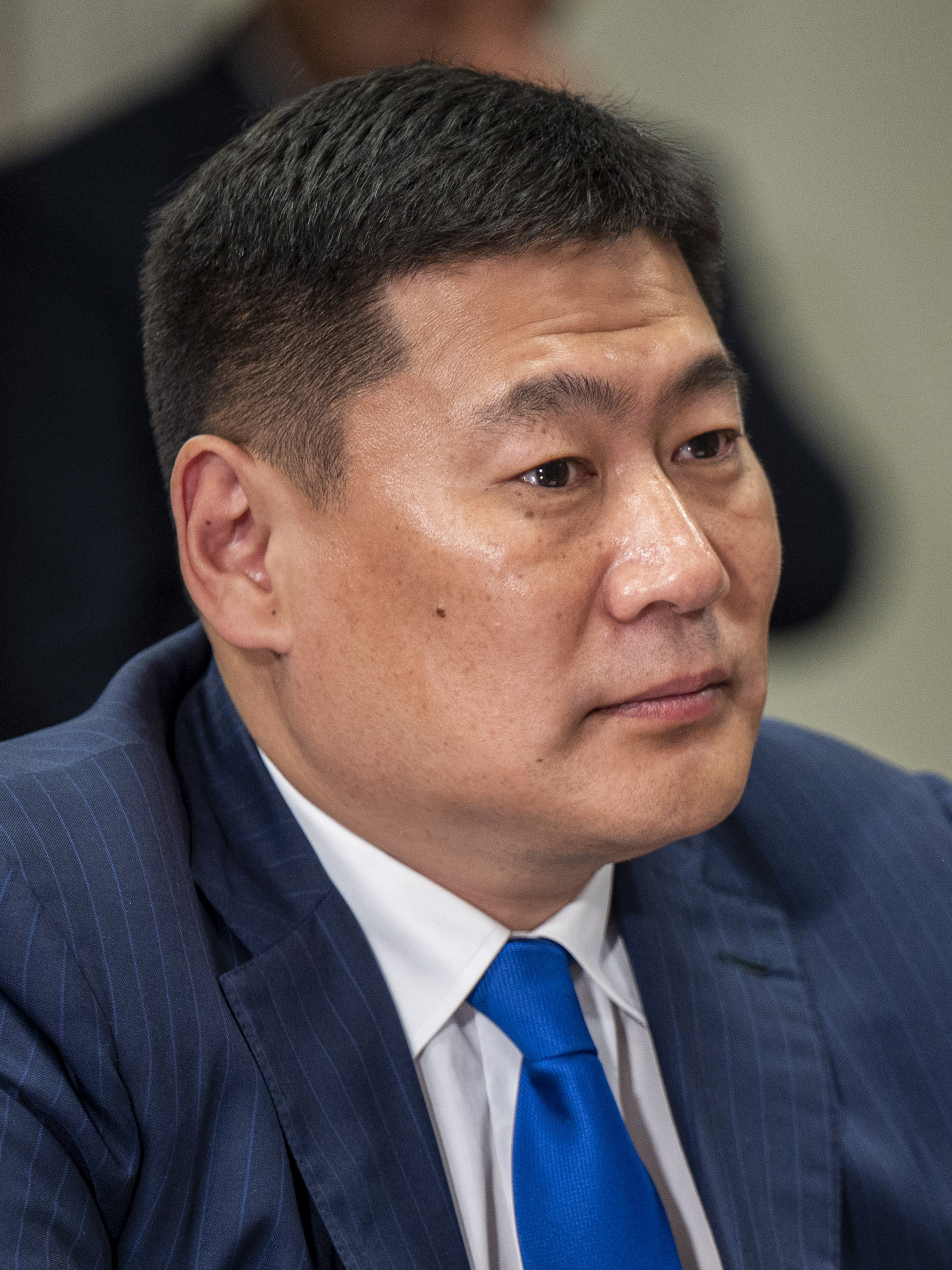
Former Prime Minister of Mongolia, Luvsannamsrai Oyun-Erdene (2021-2025)

In 2024, the two countries pledged to strengthen cooperation in climate action, cultural exchange for content creation, and urban development in Mongolia. Former Prime Minister of South Korea Han Duck-soo said:

"The similarities in the languages and cultures of [South Korea and Mongolia] have elevated the bilaterial relationship remarkably so far."

Former Prime Minister of Mongolia, Luvsannamsrai Oyun-Erdene said:

"I expect [Mongolia and South Korea] to usher in a new era in terms of economy, trade and investment in the next 30 years,"

== Joint projects ==
- Korea-Mongolia Friendship Forest

== Resident diplomatic missions ==
- Mongolia has an embassy in Seoul.
- South Korea has an embassy in Ulaanbaatar.

== See also ==
- Mongol invasions of Korea
- Mongolia–North Korea relations
- Embassy of Mongolia, Seoul
- Consulate of the Mongolia, Busan
- Embassy of South Korea, Ulaanbaatar
- Altaic languages
