= North Korea–Spain relations =

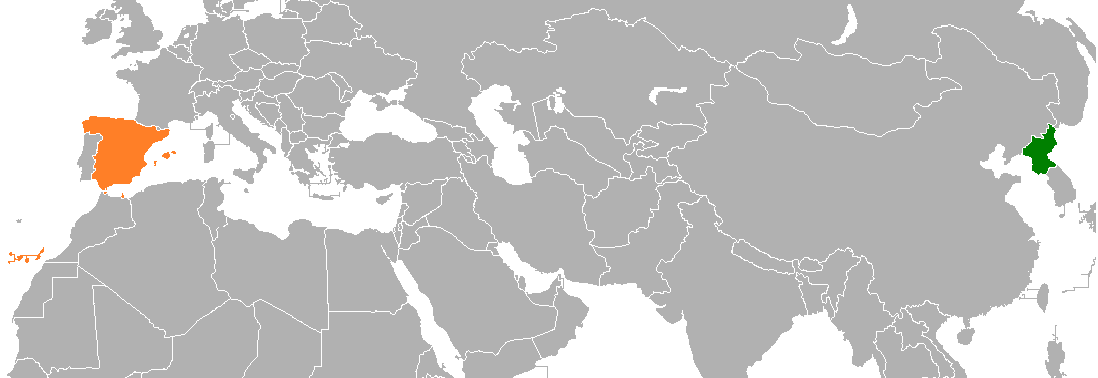

- North Korea: Spain

North Korea–Spain relations (Korean: 에스빠냐-조선민주주의인민공화국 관계) are the bilateral and diplomatic relations between these two countries. North Korea operated an embassy in Spain from 2014 to 2023, although the embassy did not engage in consular affairs as there were no North Korean civilians residing in Spain. Spain does not have an embassy in North Korea, but its embassy in South Korea operates for matters related to Spanish citizens who intend to travel to North Korea. In addition, the Spanish Ministry of Foreign Affairs recommends its registration at the Seoul embassy, given the possibility that relations between the two Koreas, already delicate, may worsen at any time. That is why Spain considers the entire territory of North Korea as a risk zone for Spanish citizens traveling to this country.

All Spanish consular matters to be resolved on North Korean territory are carried out by the Swedish Embassy in Pyongyang, under a Swedish-Spanish bilateral agreement.

== Diplomatic relations ==
On December 15, 2000, the Council of Ministers gave the green light to the establishment of diplomatic relations with the Democratic People's Republic of Korea. Spain formally maintains diplomatic relations with Pyongyang since February 7, 2001. The relations have been channeled since 2006 under multiple accreditation from the Spanish Embassy in Seoul and from the North Korean Embassy in Paris. North Korea opened its own embassy residing in Madrid in October 2013.

Spain has supported and participated in the humanitarian aid program for North Korea developed by the EU. In September 2007, it also contributed to alleviate the damage caused by the floods that ravaged the country in August. The government signed an agreement with the Spanish Red Cross to channel aid through this agency that would work directly with the North Korean Red Cross and under the supervision of International Red Cross.

On December 11, 2001, the Vice Minister of Foreign Affairs, Paer Nam Sun, made an official visit to Spain. The Vice Minister of Foreign Affairs, Kung Sok-ung, visited Madrid (October 25, 2013) as part of the formal opening of a resident embassy and held meetings with the Secretary of State for Foreign Affairs and the Director General of America North, Asia and Pacific.

On September 19, 2017, the Spanish Minister of Foreign Affairs, Alfonso Dastis reported that Spain was going to expel the ambassador North Korean in Spain, Kim Hyok Chol due to the launch of Japan missiles by North Korea. It was reported that the ambassador would have until the end of that month to leave the country.

In February 2019, people affiliated with anti-DPRK group Free Joseon allegedly entered North Korea's embassy in Madrid, attacked the staff and stole electronic hardware. The Spanish government issued arrest warrants for the suspects.

In 2023, North Korea closed its embassy in Spain in response to international sanctions and the expulsion of the North Korean ambassador in 2017.

== Private diplomacy ==
Alejandro Cao de Benós de Les y Pérez is a Spanish private citizen, best known for being the first Western cultural representative of North Korea in relations with the West, so that he has North Korean honorary nationality. He is the president of the Korean Friendship Association (KFA) and has been a permanent advocate for the Democratic People's Republic of Korea since 1990. He is a special honorary delegate of that country and a special delegate of the Committee on Cultural Relations with Foreign Countries. In North Korea, he is known by the name of 조선일 Choseon-il (‘Korea is one’).

He has his residence in Spain, where he performs representation functions for North Korea.

== See also ==
- Foreign relations of North Korea
- Foreign relations of Spain
- South Korea–Spain relations
