= Embassy of North Korea, Madrid =

Embassy of the Democratic People’s Republic of Korea in Madrid
- Location: Aravaca, Madrid
- Address: 43 Darío Aparicio, Madrid
- Coordinates: 40°28′19″N 3°46′15″W
- Opened: 1 October 2013
- Closed: 1 November 2023
- Ambassador: Kim Hyok-chol
- Chargé d'affaires: Yun Suk So

The Embassy of the Democratic People's Republic of Korea in Madrid was the diplomatic mission of North Korea to Spain. In February 2001, Spain and North Korea established diplomatic relations. In 2003, plans to open a diplomatic mission were halted due to North Korea's withdrawal from the Nuclear Non-Proliferation Treaty. On 1 October 2013, Kim Hyok-chol became the first DPRK ambassador in Spain when his country opened its new embassy in Madrid. In September 2017, he was expelled as a persona non grata in response to a North Korean nuclear test. On 22 February 2019, the Free Joseon political group allegedly broke into the embassy and stole several digital devices. As of 2019, Yun Suk-so remained the highest ranking diplomatic official, with the title of Commercial Attaché. The Embassy was closed on 1 November 2023.

== See also ==
- North Korean Embassy in Madrid incident
- Foreign relations of North Korea
- List of diplomatic missions of North Korea
- North Korea–Spain relations
