= Charles Ryu =

North Korean defector (born 1994)

- Ryu in 2019
- Born: Cheol Woo Ryu; October 1, 1994 (age 32); North Korea
- Citizenship: American
- Occupation: North Korean defector
- Years active: 2019–present

YouTube information
- Channel: Charles North Korea
- Years active: 2019–present
- Subscribers: 685 thousand
- Views: 428.8 million
- Last updated: October 17, 2026
- Website: charlesryu.com

- Cheol Woo Ryu
- Hangul: 류철우
- RR: Ryu Cheolu
- MR: Ryu Ch'ŏru

Charles Ryu (born Cheol Woo Ryu; Korean: 류철우; October 1, 1994) is a North Korean defector to the United States. He runs the YouTube channel Charles North Korea, where he speaks about the North Korean experience. An associate of Liberty in North Korea and Free Joseon, he was involved in the North Korean Embassy in Madrid incident, for which an international warrant for his arrest was issued.

== Life in North Korea ==
Ryu was born on October 1, 1994, in North Korea. He described North Koreans as "so isolated that they believe even absurd propaganda" and that "Kim Jong Il was taught about as some sort of God". His father was a Chinese man who returned to China when Charles was five. He said that at age 11, his mother starved to death and that he became a homeless orphan. In 2008, he fled to China and lived there for some time, but was later sent back to North Korea by the Chinese government. After returning to North Korea, he was put in a prison camp, and according to him, was "beaten, fed only 150 kernels of corn per day, and worked eighteen-hour shifts" in a coal mine. He also said he once ate grains of rice from dried vomit. He was released from the prison after serving a nine-month sentence, after which he again fled to China, via the Yalu River. He then fled to Thailand, where the United Nations gave him asylum status before transporting him to the United States.

== Life as a defector ==
In the United States, Ryu created the YouTube channel Charles North Korea, where he primarily speaks of his experience in North Korea. His videos include man on the street interviews, in which he wears a sign that reads "ask a North Korean". He is a software engineer and lives in Rancho Palos Verdes, California as of 2017. He also converted to Christianity.

Ryu is anti-communist. Since 2018, he has publicly spoken out in opposition to North Korea. He criticized the 2018 North Korea–United States Singapore Summit, saying he felt unsafe in the United States as a result of it. He also criticized Executive Order 13769, believing that refugees should be allowed entry into the United States, as he himself was.

Ryu interned for Liberty in North Korea in 2017 and later involved himself in Free Joseon. In June 2019, investigations showed he was connected to the North Korean Embassy in Madrid incident, where he and co-conspirators violently broke into a North Korean embassy and stole sensitive documents, later handing them to the FBI. Judge José de la Mata issued an international warrant for his arrest.
