= Saejowi =

South Korean non-profit

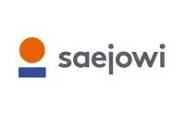
- Founded: 1988
- Founder: Hong, Sa-deok†
- Type: NGO
- Purpose: North Korean defectors, Korean reunification, refugee resettlement, medical & counseling services
- Location: Seoul, South Korea
- Region served: South Korea, East Asia, United States
- Managing Representative: Shin, Mi-nyeo
- Key people: Shin, Mi-nyeo, CEO, Hwang, Jung-geun; Jung, Su-seong
- Website: http://www.saejowi.org

Saejowi (Korean: 새조위), also known as Saejowi Initiative for National Integration (새롭고 하나된 조국을 위한 모임), operates in Seoul, South Korea, as a nongovernmental organization (NGO) that assists North Korean defectors with settlement in South Korea. Saejowi sponsors programs that provide medical support, job training, and other educational opportunities in order to aid with defector adjustment to South Korean society. Additionally, Saejowi works to encourage civil involvement in the Korean reunification movement, especially among the defector community. The organization hosts programs that facilitate open communication between South Koreans and defectors from North Korea. It has previously worked with the Korean Ministry of Unification, Korea Hana Foundation, and the Community Chest of Korea.

== History ==
Saejowi was first established on October 15, 1988, by Hong, Sa-deok (홍사덕), a former Korean senator and former Acting Representative of the Korean Council for Reconciliation and Cooperation (민족화해협력범국민협의회). Saejowi was founded with the publication of Hong's book "My Dream, My Challenge" (나의 꿈, 나의 도전), which advocates the reconsideration of Korean reunification among South Koreans.

In March 1991 the Korean Ministry of Unification registered Saejowi as a social movement, and in July 2001 Saejowi was officially registered as a nongovernmental organization. The organization's first resettlement support center for North Korean defectors began operations in 2003. Three years later in 2006, Saejowi opened the first medical support center at the National Medical Center. A year later a call center was established in the same location for refugees with medical questions. In the next six years, three other medical counseling centers were opened in the following locations: Chungnam National University Hospital (2009), Incheon Red Cross Hospital (2011), and the Seoul Medical Center (서울특별시 서울의료원) (2012).

Beginning in 2007 Saejowi has hosted coaching sessions for North Korean defectors looking to become professional counselors. In 2012, Saejowi began a domestic violence counseling service that focuses on providing women with information regarding self-defense in sexual and domestic violence situations. In 2013 Saejowi celebrated its 25th anniversary with a special international policy forum held in conjunction with the Hanns Seidel Foundation from Berlin, Germany.

Since March 2009 Dr. Shin, Mi-nyeo has been the acting representative of Saejowi.

== Medical support ==
Since its inception in 1988, Saejowi has worked primarily in the medical community, where it has established medical counseling centers for North Korean defectors in four South Korean hospitals. By the end of 2014, Saejowi had provided medical counseling assistance to approximately 7,500 North Korean refugees.

Saejowi's four medical centers were established to provide medical counseling to supplement and explain professional diagnoses and treatments. The organization's counselors are North Korean defectors, so they are able to describe medical recommendations using the North Korean dialect. The medical counseling offered by Saejowi specifically addresses the following situations: North Korean defectors who arrive in South Korea with untreated physical illness and posttraumatic stress disorder (PTSD), North Korean defectors who are unable to obtain necessary medical treatment because of misunderstandings caused by differences between medical procedures in North and South Korea, and North Korean defectors who experience difficulties understanding medical terms and phrases derived from English and other Western languages.

So far, Saejowi has helped licensed 220 counselors. The medical counseling centers have become a place to share and to meet over personal difficulties as well as a place to connect with other refugees.

== Job training ==
In order to help North Korean defectors obtain employment in South Korea, Saejowi provides them with programs that address their physical, psychological, social, and emotional needs. The organization has also created other short-term programs on an as-needed basis, such as a language program initiated in 2010 with the Daewon Foreign Language High School to provide English language training to defectors.

=== Coaching ===
Through Saejowi's "Coaching" (코칭) program, North Korean defectors can develop the necessary skills to become licensed as counselors who can provide assistance to other defectors as they utilize the South Korean healthcare system. These classes teach participants how to assist patients as they obtain medical referrals, schedule necessary appointments, receive discharge information, and communicate with medical staff. Counselors also provide defectors with social support by visiting them in the hospital, listening to their concerns, and sharing information regarding life in South Korea. By the end of 2013, 118 North Koreans were certified as counselors, with 59 defectors officially employed in a career related to their counseling training.

=== Domestic violence counseling ===
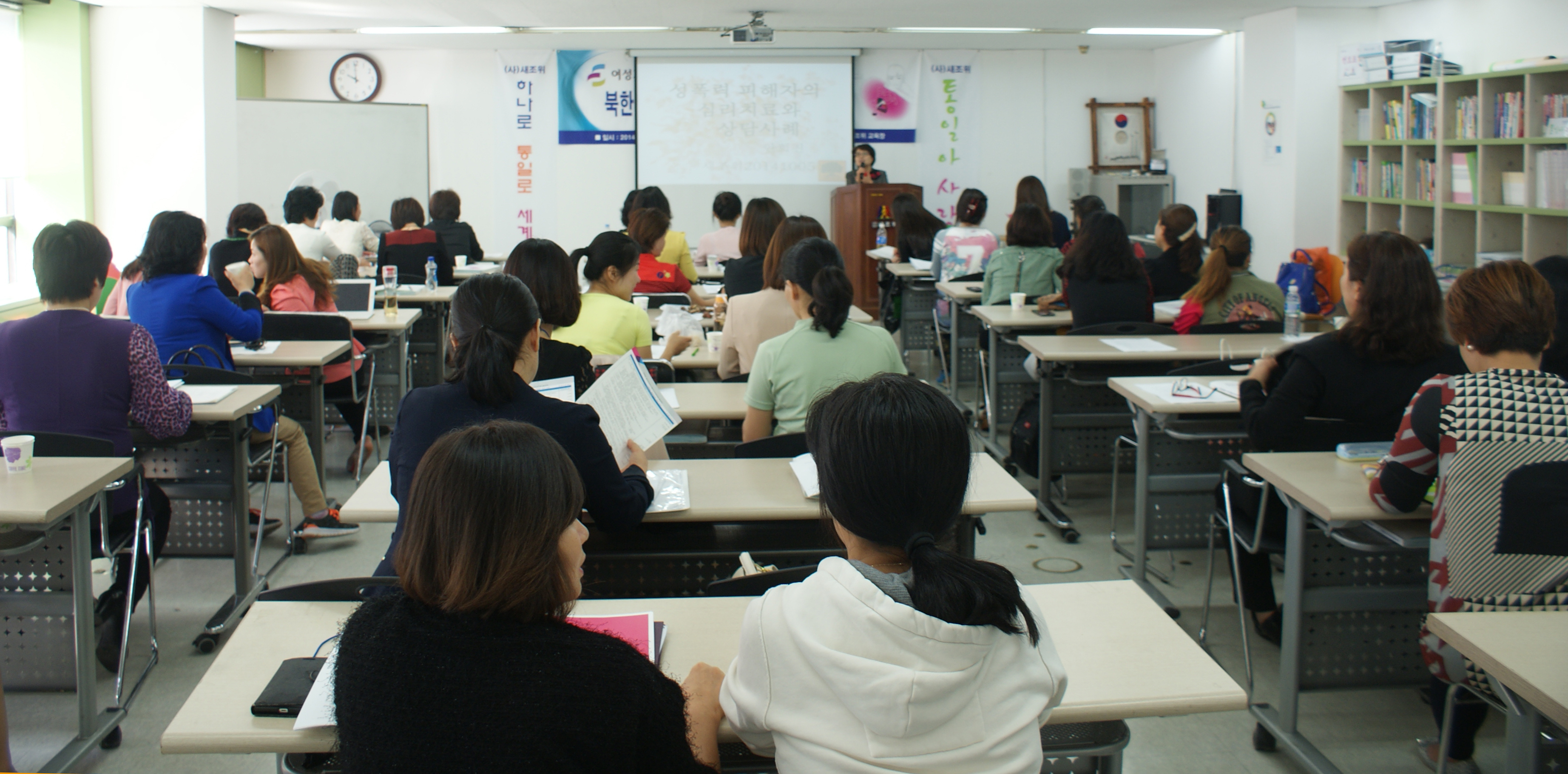
Saejowi's Sexual Violence Counseling for North Korean Women in Seoul, South Korea (2014)

The organization's domestic and sexual violence counseling for North Korean defectors is for defectors who have suffered through abusive family situations. Because many North Koreans believe that their abusive family situations are "normal," they do not seek assistance for domestic violence offenses. Through these counseling sessions Saejowi provides these defectors with the information they need to both recognize and avoid abusive situations.

=== Home care service ===
Saejowi's "Home Care Service" (홈케어 서비스) trains defectors in the basics of childcare and household duties. Participants in this program provide home care services to North Korean defectors who lack the financial means to pay for similar services offered by South Korean companies. These household helpers focus on assisting families with single parents needing to work, elderly needing regular hospice care, and sick family members needing medical services.

== Designed Support ==
Saejowi provides North Korean refugees with a designed range of types of support : Counseling Support, an Emotional Support, a Living Support Linkage and a Program Support Linkage. As their core purpose, these programs aim toward a full integration of North Korean refugees into South Korean society. For they count on "deep connection with the local Seoul community and its ongoing cooperation with government agencies".

=== Annual Family Home Care Service ===
After an interruption, the annual program "Family Home Care Service" restarted in March 2024, it runs from May to November in Seoul. The program works in cooperation with Seoul's local government and approximately 25 professionals specialized in North Korean counseling. They provide medical care, emotional care, a social network and an emotional support.

=== A Lifeline for Elderly Defectors ===
As a major part of the defectors population, the elderly people are particularly vulnerable to health issues or social isolation. The Home Care Service comes directly to their houses. Meetings are organised on a regular basis in order to break with the elder's isolation. These activities are also designed to help connect with their neighbors and assure their everyday healthcare.

== Educational and Cultural Programs ==
Saejowi works to educate South Koreans and the global community about the difficulties faced by North Korean defectors. Initially founded as a "reunification movement," Saejowi continues to operate by advocating Korean reunification as well as the human rights of the North Korean people.

=== Reunification coordinator school ===
The educational opportunities provided by Saejowi are intended to facilitate improved relationships between North Korean defectors and South Koreans. In 2014, Saejowi hosted the"Reunification Coordinator School"(통일 코디네이터 학교) program, where approximately fifteen South Koreans and fifteen North Korean defectors met together on a weekly basis to discuss what needs to happen before North and South Korea can effectively reunify. The North Korean defectors in this program offered insights into what South Korea could do better to more effectively accommodate the needs of the North Korean population.

=== Performances ===
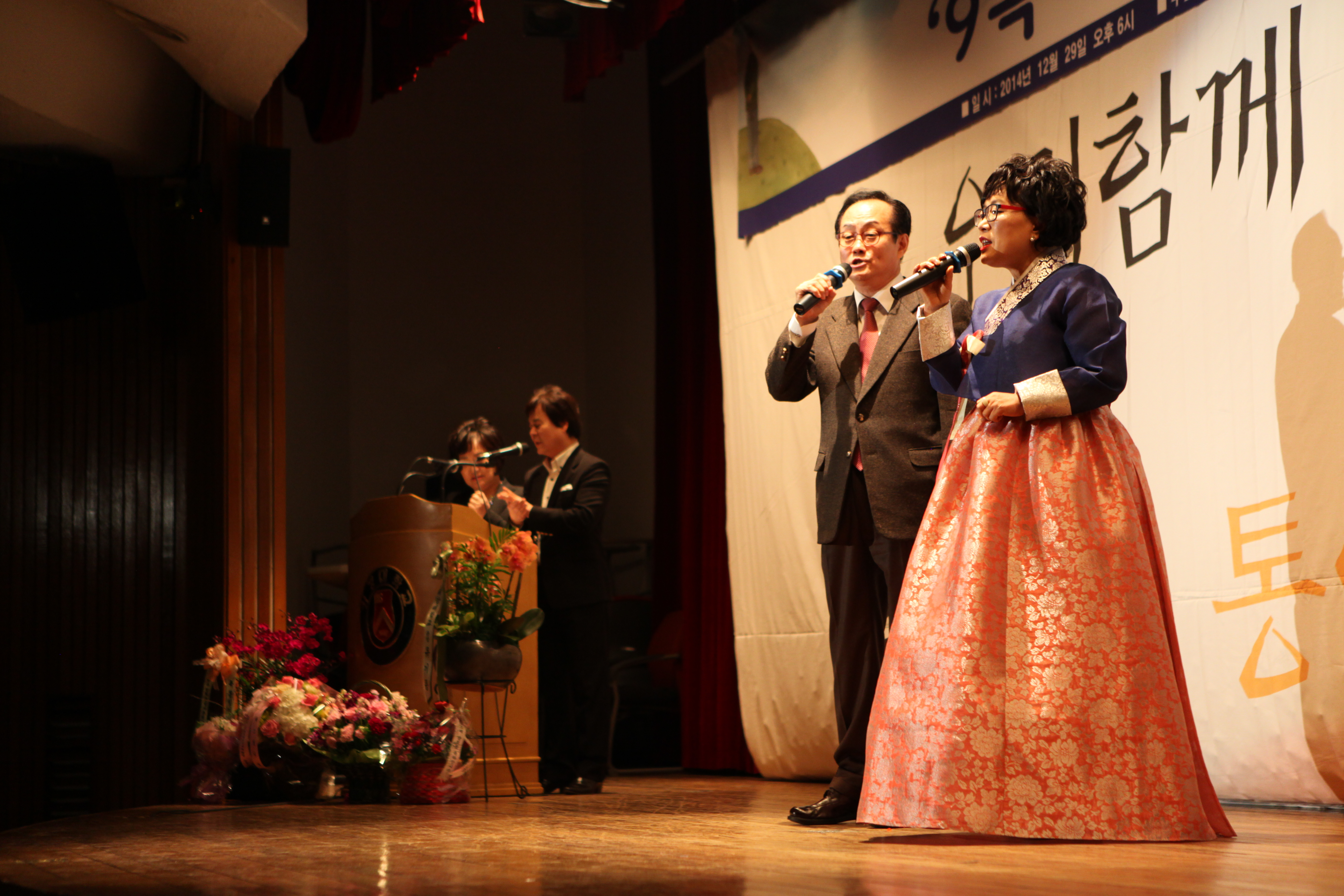
Dr. Shin, Mi-nyeo and Prof. Kim, Young-soo perform songs about Korean reunification at Sogang University (December 2014)

In November 2014 Saejowi co-sponsored the performance "The Story of Those Who Left" with the Seoul Foundation for Arts and Culture. This was a modern dance performance aimed at expressing the human will to survive. The Promise Team from Berlin, Germany, adapted and performed the stories of four North Korean women and highlighted their ability to discover a new life despite the difficulties and challenges they had previously faced. This performance provided the participating North Korean women with an opportunity to share their stories through an artistic medium.

On December 29, 2014, Dr. Shin Mi-nyeo of Saejowi and Prof. Kim Young-soo, professor at Sogang University's Political Science Department, performed nine songs from their new album, which features music focused on the emotions surrounding the division of the Korean peninsula. The songs were produced in collaboration with Seo Seung-il, a popular composer in South Korea.

Saejowi continues hosting annual tour performances through South Korea with a new theater play each year.

In October 2019, started the tour of Saejowi's play "If Spring arrives". Through the common work of two North Korean actors and South Korean actors, the show gives an insight on how North Korean continue to live while arriving in South Korea. It was created through a various mix of real stories and personalities encountered in Saejowi's program "Stitches for Reunification".

In October 2020, Saejowi hosted the first part of its annual tour online due to Covid-19 restrictions. The play "Superstar Lee Dong Hyun" (슈퍼스타 리동현) ran from October 21 to October 26 and was performed at the 남북통합문화센터 (North-South Unification Cultural Center) with a diffusion on YouTube. In an imaginary scenario, Dong-Hyun, a North Korean defector participate in a singing contest, in order to find his lost brother. He receives help from his South Korean friend, Yejin, and her family.

Due to Covid-19 pandemic, the second part of the tour was postponed until November. As a result of the sanitarian situation, it was headed live-streaming on YouTube. The play "Romeo and Juliet : Lee Joong-Ho and Kim Ye-Sul" (로미오&주리엣:리중호와 김예슬이) showcases an imaginary scenario settled in a reunified Korea and in which a North-South Korean couple tries to stick together despite cultural differences, linguistic barriers and their families' possible objections.

In 2023, the production "Azalea Village Story"(진다래 마음 이야기) was performed in 13 schools across South Korea between July 3 and July 20, with the aim on reaching 9,309 students among the country. It focused on showing struggles North Korean face among the integration process. With the Director Kim Young-soo, playwrighter Jang Han-byeol and directed by Lee Joo-han. Among the casting : Gang Kang, Lee Seon, Chang Yu-ri, Kim Ha-Young, Han Dong-hee, Yoon Min-goo, Kim Soo-chan, Kwon Hyun-woo.

An advisory meeting was held by Saejowi on June 27 at the Saejowi Lecture Hall (under CEO Dr Shin Mi-nyeo's supervision) to concert advisors and dramaturges. Among them, Geumsang Kwon (Doctor of Education, North Korean Studies), Youngsoo Kim (Director of the Institute of North Korean Studies), Yeonsook Park (Professor at Soongsil University), Jinwook Seo (Professor at Paichai University), Yeong-jong Lee (Reporter), Seong-il Lim (Humanities Specialist), and Jeonghee Jeon (Visiting Professor at Ewha Womans University).

2024 marked the 15th production hosted by Saejowi, this year focused was on North Korean's human rights through two plays : "Small Happiness"(작은 행복) and "Hope"(소망). They were directed by Kim Young-soo and Lee Joo-han with a script from Jang Han-byeol. These production have been made in collaboration with the Ministry of Unification as well as the Gyeonggi-do region's officers and the 18 schools where the production could be played. Its purpose was presented by Saejowi as a way to educate younger generation on the reunification. The tour concluded on August 29, 2024 with the last performance of "Hope"(소망).

== Research activities ==
In recent years Saejowi has increased its focus on researching the problems surrounding defection from North Korea. While the organization emphasizes analyzing medical trends in the North Korean defector community in South Korea, it has also partnered with other research foundations in order to further research on how Korean reunification may impact North Korean defectors and the larger North Korean population. Saejowi also disseminates information and primary sources regarding defectors through various publications and forums in an effort to counteract discrimination against refugees.

=== International Policy Forum ===
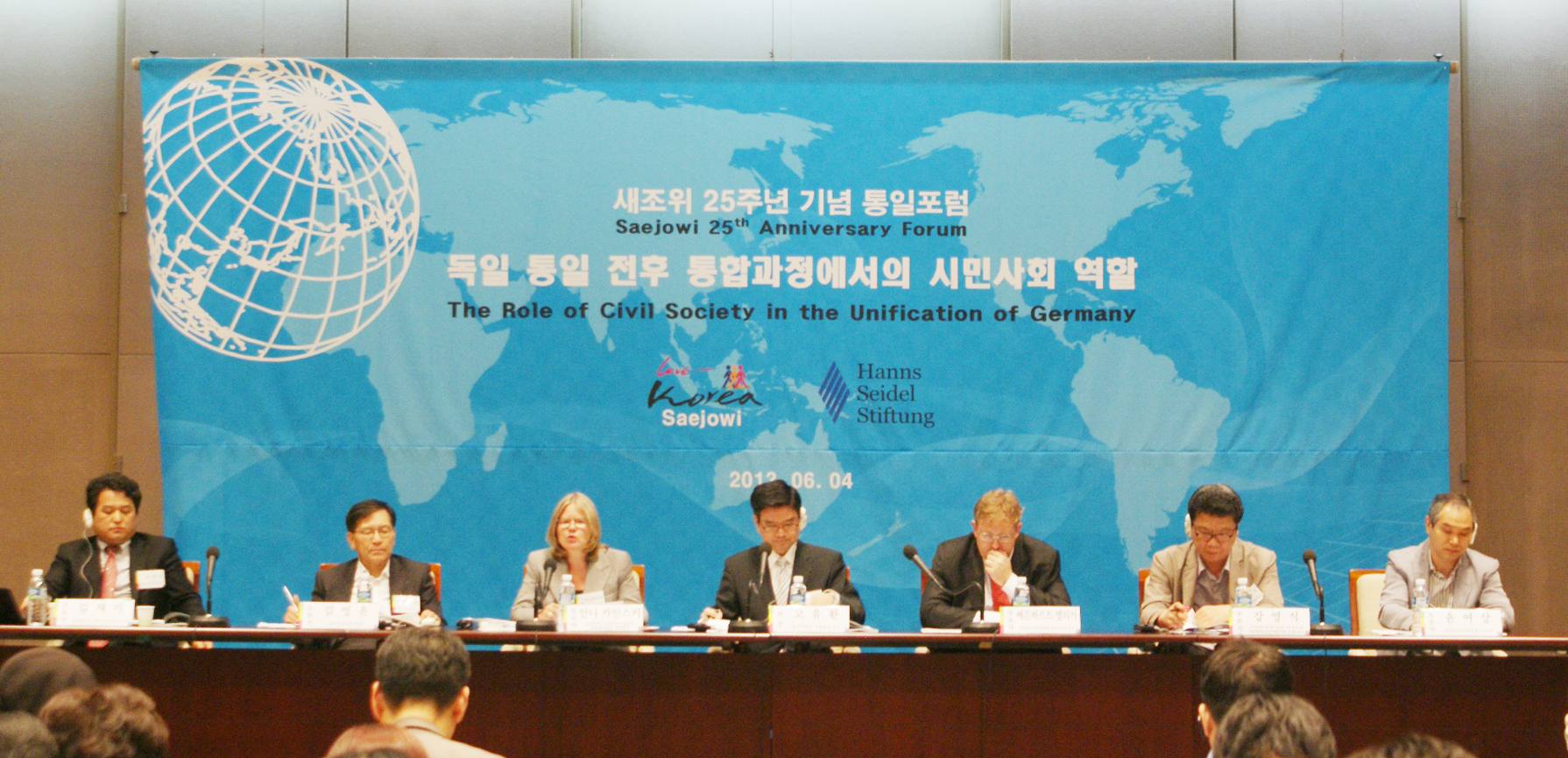
International Conference between the Hanns Seidel Foundation from Germany and Saejowi from South Korea (Korea Press Center, 2013)

As part of its 25th anniversary, Saejowi co-hosted a conference with the Hanns Seidel Foundation on June 4, 2013. The forum focused on how the West German government adapted to the flow of refugees from East Germany into West Germany between 1945 and the fall of the Berlin Wall. The role of civil society and non-governmental organizations in the German reunification process was also discussed, as well as the lessons applicable in the Korean context.

=== Letters to North Korea ===
Since 2004 Saejowi has been collecting letters written by North Korean defectors back home to North Korea. Because letters posted from South Korea are not deliverable in North Korea, the letters are never sent; however, the defectors have given permission for the publication of the letters on an annual basis. Saejowi recently completed an English translation of forty of these letters and published the collection in 2015 with the title "Under the Apricot Tree." These letters provide insight into the inner thoughts of refugees before and after they leave North Korea.

== Partners ==
- Community Chest of Korea
- Hanns Seidel Foundation
- Korea Hana Foundation
- Seoul Foundation for Arts and Culture
- South Korean Ministry of Gender Equality and Family
- South Korean Ministry of Security and Public Administration
- South Korean Ministry of Unification

== See also ==
- Durihana
- Liberty in North Korea
