= Hannah Song =

American activist

- Born: Michigan
- Education: College
- Occupations: President and CEO of LiNK
- Known for: Human Rights in North Korea Advocate

Hannah Song is the president and CEO of US nonprofit Liberty in North Korea (LiNK), which raises awareness of the human-rights situation in North Korea and provides resettlement support to North Korean refugees.

== Early life and education ==
Song grew up in New Jersey. She is one of three children born to Korean immigrants and the granddaughter of a woman who emigrated to the U.S. before the Korean War from what is now North Korea.

== Career ==
Before joining LiNK, Song worked in advertising at OgilvyOne and Mindshare, with a focus on digital media and emerging technologies.

Song, who had previously been unaware about the situation in North Korea, says that she was changed by her reading of Aquariums of Pyongyang, the true account of a boy who spent 10 years in a North Korean prison camp in North Korea. In 2006, she started working full-time at LiNK's headquarters in Washington, D.C. She worked as Deputy Director until 2008, when Hong chose her to become the organization's new CEO and Executive Director. The next year, headquarters was moved to California. LiNK's headquarters are currently located in Long Beach, California.

LiNK's revenue more than doubled between 2008 and 2009.

== Other professional activities ==
In a TEDx talk entitled "Changes in North Korea", given in Tripoli, Libya, in 2012, Song said that while "many people have written North Korea off, saying that it is hopeless," the fact is that "North Korea is changing," and that that change "is being driven by the people." The change is not at "the level of high politics" but is "on the ground." Although the country is "still incredibly closed off and incredibly impoverished," the changes that have occurred in the last ten years have also been "incredible," and if they continue, a dramatic transformation is "inevitable."

She spoke at an event, "North Korea's Political Prison Camp System and the Plight of North Korean Refugees," held at the Museum of Tolerance in Los Angeles in October 2012, sponsored by the Committee for Human Rights in North Korea (HRNK), The Simon Wiesenthal Center, and LiNK.
