= Durihana =

South Korean aid organization

Durihana North Korea Mission (북한선교 두리하나; Bukhan-seongyo Durihana) is a defector aid Christian organization based in South Korea, founded by Pastor Chun Ki-won. The organization assists North Korean defectors escape from North Korea and China, often by helping refugees to pay their "brokers" fee, which allows them to cross borders. The group also provides migrants with temporary hideouts and helps them move to more secure areas. Durihana has been recognized as one of the main South Korean NGOs involved in aiding North Korean defectors in China.

== History ==
Chinese police arrested founder Pastor Chun Ki-won in 2002 on the Mongolian border, on the escape route he pioneered. His arrest and eight month imprisonment caused a stir in South Korea, exposing the plight of North Korean defectors.

In 1995, as a missionary in the Yanbian Korean Autonomous Prefecture, Chun met his first North Koreans in hiding. "These people had lost all their rights," he said. "The most important thing I could do was revive their humanity." Chun orchestrated the escapes of more than 1,200 North Koreans with only a handful of failures.

Nonetheless, the group has been criticized by some for complicating the relations between North and South Korea.

In September 2023, Chun was arrested in Seoul on suspicion of sexually molesting six North Korean teenagers, including defectors staying in the dormitories of the alternative school he established at Durihana's headquarters. In February 2024, Chun was convicted and sentenced by the Seoul Central District Court to five years' imprisonment over the charges.

== See also ==
- Liberty in North Korea
- Saejowi
