= North Korean Embassy in Madrid incident =

2019 violent clash in Spain

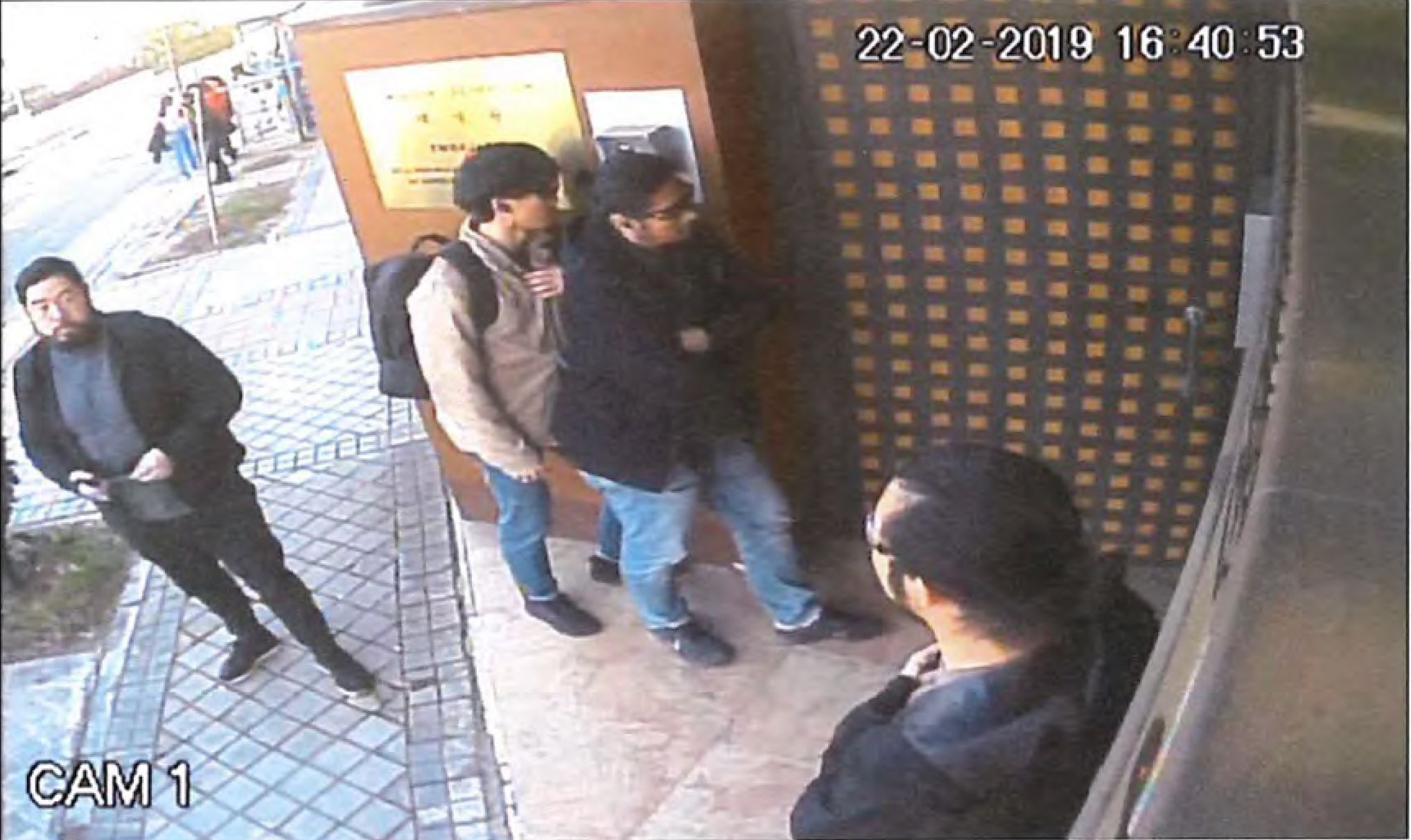
- Members of Free Joseon waiting outside of the North Korean embassy in Madrid, moments before the raid
- Date: 22 February 2019
- Location: Embassy of North Korea, Madrid, Spain; 40°28′19″N 3°46′15″W

Parties
Free Joseon	North Korea

Lead figures
Adrian Hong Chang	Yun Suk So

Casualties
- Injuries: 8
- Arrested: 1
- Location of the embassy

On 22 February 2019 at the Embassy of North Korea in Madrid, the political group Free Joseon, which is opposed to Kim Jong Un and the current government of North Korea, is alleged by Spanish and American authorities to have attacked the embassy. Free Joseon maintains that they were invited in to facilitate a high-level defection. A group of individuals stole mobile telephones, two USB flash drives and a hard drive from the embassy and handed them over to the Federal Bureau of Investigation (FBI) in the United States. The event took place after the Singapore summit between North Korea (DPRK) and the United States and prior to the Hanoi summit. As of early April 2019, one person had been arrested in connection with the incident and two international arrest warrants had been issued by the Spanish Audiencia Nacional. The suspected perpetrators are citizens of Mexico, the US and South Korea, although the latter two governments denied any connection with the incident.

The incident is alleged to have been violent; the suspected perpetrators purportedly possessed knives and replica guns, and a number of embassy staff were treated for injuries. Another member of the embassy staff injured herself by leaping from an upper window before alerting police. The Spanish authorities' investigations were kept secret for the first month; when they released their findings—including the names of the suspected perpetrators—they were criticised for possibly endangering the named peoples' lives. The Spanish privately briefed the media that they suspected but could not prove Central Intelligence Agency (CIA) involvement because the attack was professional in its precision. One former CIA agent, however, said the timing of the attack and its high-profile nature would have made it impossible for the CIA to have condoned it or taken part. The Government of North Korea described the incident as an act of terrorism and demanded an international investigation; the embassy and its attaché, however, did not report the attack or any injuries sustained by the staff to the Spanish police.

Free Joseon has denied allegations that this incident was a break-in raid of the compound, and accusations of being directed by foreign intelligence services. Rather, the group asserts that it was invited in by some undisclosed number of embassy staffers who wished to defect. In order to protect their family members in North Korea, who would ostensibly be punished for a relative's defection, these embassy staffers reportedly requested a staged kidnapping and physical injuries to absolve themselves of suspicion from the North Korean government. It is alleged that a staffer's panic around the plot being discovered precipitated the botched defection effort.

== Background ==
Logo of Free Joseon

Free Joseon — also known as Cheollima Civil Defense — the group alleged to have carried out the attack, has been described by The Washington Post as a "secretive dissident organization" and a "shadowy group trying to overthrow Kim Jong Un", whose government they claim to be an "immoral and illegitimate regime". Free Joseon is alleged to be composed primarily of North Korean defectors, and claims to have "hundreds of members across ten countries", says Chestnut Greitens. (Note: Although Chestnut Greitens also continues, "though its actual membership is unclear".) Two days before the attack the group's website was recruiting field agents, guards and field intelligence agents; the advertisements were tailored towards young people who had previously lived in China and were "willing to devote to the liberation of the North". According to the website, these roles required "insight, intelligence and physical strength". Sung-Yoon Lee of Tufts University said the group "is the first known resistance movement against North Korea, which makes its activities very newsworthy". Greg Scarlatoiu, the executive director of the Committee for Human Rights in North Korea, said "this is the first time we see organized, apparently militant resistance outside of North Korea". The group previously tried to make a name for itself by attempting to provide protection for Kim Jong Un's nephew, Kim Han-sol, whose father had recently been assassinated two years earlier.

The incident took place just before the US President Donald Trump was due to meet Kim Jong Un for further talks on the DPRK's proposed denuclearisation program; a previous summit held in January 2019 in Hanoi, Vietnam, had failed and relations between North Korea and the US had deteriorated further.

The DPRK's embassy in Madrid, located at 43 Darío Aparicio in the quiet, affluent northern suburb of Aravaca, consists of a two-story "luxurious villa" with a swimming pool and is surrounded by pine trees. The compound is in the middle of a patch of open land that has remained undeveloped because it assists natural drainage for the area. According to El País, since the previous ambassador Kim Hyok-chol was expelled in 2017, only one diplomat and two assistants with their immediate families living a relatively "spartan" existence were resident at the time of the attack. Neighbours, however, reported that a few days prior to the incident, a grand party that had attracted local attention had been held at the embassy.

The CIA is known to work closely with defector organisations opposed to regimes unfriendly to the US, although such work "does not, in itself, prove CIA involvement in the Madrid episode".

=== Perpetrators ===
Adrian Hong Chang, was a resident of the US but a citizen of Mexico. Educated in the US, he was instrumental in the foundation of the US-based human-rights group Liberty in North Korea and also the Joseon Institute. BBC journalist Laura Bicker wrote that Hong Chang was "a well-known North Korean human rights activist [who] has helped defectors flee North Korea in the past"; his "associates", reported the Financial Times, "say he has links to US intelligence agencies". Hong appears to have been arrested in China in 2006 for reportedly helping North Korean defectors there. Another North Korean defector, Kang Chol-hwan, has stated that, whereas Hong previously worked in "mainstream" NGOs, he had recently moved into increasingly "secretive, underground activities" preparing for "imminent, dramatic change". In 2011 he suggested that the Arab Spring uprisings were "a dress rehearsal for North Korea", and had travelled to Libya to research the events more closely. The gang's leader, Christopher Ahn was an ex-US Marine and human rights activist. Another person involved was defector Charles Ryu.

=== Kim Hyok-chol ===
The previous DPRK Ambassador to Spain Kim Hyok-chol had been expelled by the Spanish Government in September 2017 in response to North Korea's continued testing of nuclear missiles in defiance of the international community. Although persona non-grata in Spain, Kim returned to the DPRK to become one of the architects of Kim Jong Un's diplomacy with the US, including the failed Vietnam summit. Analyst Andrei Lankov describes Kim Hyok-chol as Stephen Biegun's North Korean counterpart.

Little is known in the West of Kim Hyok-chol's personality or career. It was noted that the computers and telephones that were seized by the attackers would be a "treasure trove" to intelligence services around the world for the information and communications they probably contained, and would be "eagerly sought after". Obtaining private information on Kim Hyok-chol, who has been described as "a natural target" for those interested in the DPRK's nuclear program, and information on North Korea's re-armament program may have been the purpose of the attack.

Tufts University professor Sung-Yoon Lee believed it likely the seized materials could contain valuable information about any recent plans by the DPRK to evade the sanctions against its government, claims that were repeated on Fox News by Gordon G. Chang. Noting that Kim Hyok-chol had been recalled from Spain to lead North Korea's negotiations, Lee suggested any information held on those computers, including information on his activities in Spain, would have helped the US and its allies "to gain an edge in the negotiations" in Hanoi. For the Free Jeoson group, securing such top-secret information would "enhance their own status".

== Attack ==
Grounds of the Embassy

The group began its operation two weeks in advance, when Hong Chang, using the alias Matthew Chao and posing as managing partner of fictional investment firm "Baron Stone Capital", had a brief meeting with commercial attaché Yun Suk So regarding investment in the DPRK. Around 16:34 CET on Friday, 22 February 2019, Hong Chang asked and was admitted to see Yun on the same matter. Street lights in front of the embassy were dimmed around this time; other security systems around the building were also found to have been neutralised.

Once Hong had been admitted inside the building, the remaining members of the group allegedly burst in after him. Other possibilities include that Hong let them while unattended, that they climbed a perimeter wall, or that embassy staff invited them in. The ten intruders were described as masked, Asian in appearance and Korean-speaking. All but one appeared below the age of 30. The group carried various weapons including replica firearms, balaclavas, a 3.8-metre (12 ft) telescopic ladder and 33 rolls of double-sided tape.

At the time, there were eight embassy staff members and guests present including a group of North Korean architecture students; Yun was the embassy's highest-ranking diplomat in residence. It was uncertain the Free Joseon members were aware of the embassy's business that day and may have been surprised by the guests' presence.

The intruders allegedly tied up and hooded all staff and guests present. Then, they allegedly interrogated and assaulted the embassy staff, principally Yun whom they tried to persuade to defect and then assaulted when he refused. Two staff members later required medical attention, mainly as a result of bruising from multiple, heavy blows. A particular topic of interest appeared to be Kim Hyok-Chol, about whom they questioned Yun intensively.

It was an unusual sight in the normally quiet streets of the wealthy Valdermarín neighbourhood on the edge of Madrid: an Asian woman, badly injured, stumbling down the pavement pleading for help.

— Journalists Ian Mount, Edward White and Kang Buseong

A female Korean staff member, Cho Sun Hi—who lived in the embassy with her husband—hid in a second-floor room and locked the door. Around an hour into the raid (5 pm), she escaped from the compound by jumping from the window, injuring herself. Cho screamed for help, alerting neighbours who called the police. When the police arrived, they had difficulty understanding her, since she spoke no Spanish and had sustained a head injury; initially, police wondered if Cho was mentally ill. They took her to a police station and tried to find an interpreter. Eventually they used a translation app on her phone.

Cho told police that "a group of men have entered the embassy and gagged the staff", spurring the police to return to the embassy and attempt entry. Hong Chang answered the door wearing a Kim Il Sung and Kim Jong Il badge, and assured them there was nothing untoward occurring. As Chang appeared to be a staff member and entry without authorization from the head of the mission would violate the Vienna Convention on Diplomatic Relations, (Note: Per the convention, the host state "must take all appropriate steps to protect the diplomatic/consular premises ... while it is forbidden for agents of the receiving state to enter these premises without due consent". Generally "the inviolability of diplomatic missions is strictly interpreted: without consent of the head of the mission, the agents of the receiving state may not enter the diplomatic missions".) they instead set up a security perimeter outside.

While the police waited outside, additional men entered and were identified by the police. The intruders filmed themselves ransacking the building, and collected most of the embassy's electronic equipment to take with them. Then the embassy gates suddenly opened and embassy vehicles sped away with eight intruders; the police did not follow. These cars were found abandoned a few streets away hours later and removed for forensic examination. Another car with Hong Chang in it apparently left from the rear of the building soon after; it later transpired this was an Uber taxi he had ordered in the name of Oswaldo Trump. (Note: Hong Chang had an Uber account in the name of Oswaldo Trump, and an Italian driving licence as Matthew Chao.)

The incident lasted for about five hours; it had ended by 21:40. When the SAMUR paramedics arrived, they treated three injured. Spanish police entered the building and performed a visual search, finding a substantial cache of automatic weaponry, presumably left by the intruders.

Following their escape, the group split into four groups and made their ways to Portugal and then to the US. Chang apparently telephoned the FBI on 27 February to make a statement giving the assailants' view of events.

== Reactions ==
The raid represents the most ambitious operation to date for an obscure organization that seeks to undermine the North Korean regime and encourage mass defections.

— Washington Post

There was little initial reaction to the incident, even in South Korea. The North Korean government did not make a public comment.

Then, in mid-March 2019, the Spanish daily newspaper El País reported that at least two of the perpetrators had links to the CIA. BBC News described such allegations as "explosive", given the delicate relations between the US and North Korea at the time. Any CIA involvement would have also violated Spanish sovereignty and disrupted accepted diplomatic norms, severely damaging US relations with both the DPRK and Spain and setting a dangerous precedent for the many US embassies worldwide. Moreover, if the CIA were involved, then it would have been working with other western intelligence agencies.

At a news briefing, Robert Palladino of the US State Department denied any US government involvement in the raid. Sources whom The Washington Post described as "familiar with the incident" denied the involvement of intelligence agencies, however, saying they would have been unwilling to involve themselves in such a high-profile incident at a critical juncture in US–DPRK relations. (Note: Sue Mi Terry, ex-North Korea analyst for the CIA expanded on this, saying that "infiltrating a North Korean embassy days before the nuclear summit would throw that all into jeopardy ... this is not something the CIA would undertake".) Anonymous Spanish government officials were not convinced by the CIA's claim, but acknowledged that even if their suspicions about CIA involvement were accurate it would be difficult to prove the allegations in court.

Pyongyang stated that the raid was a breach of their sovereignty and a terrorist attack, suggesting FBI involvement. In a statement, the embassy said the attack had caused "severe mental, physical and material damage on the members of the diplomatic staff and their families". The government demanded an investigation into an "act of extortion" by a "small-fry organisation" that Korean Central News Agency said "should never be tolerated". They said they would wait patiently and acknowledge the Spanish investigation in line with international law, although former North Korean diplomat Thae Yong-ho said the DPRK government would be "putting pressure" on Spain over the incident. They also said their embassy staff had been tortured, and the DPRK summoned their ambassadors to Russia, the United States and the United Nations back to Pyongyang.

Citing unnamed Spanish police investigators and officials from the National Intelligence Center and the General Information Office, El Mundo speculated information could also have emanated from within the embassy to the group. The police said this would explain the precision of the attackers; the paper pointed to other occasions in which North Korea had attacked its own diplomatic staff, such as the former North Korean ambassador to Rome who had disappeared in January 2018. Free Joseon later claimed that the procedure was originally a staged kidnapping to hide a high-level defection from the North Korean government.

The embassy raid led to speculation that it suggested a new, more militant form of North Korean nationalism could be emerging. However, argues political analyst Sheena Chestnut Greitens, this did not come to pass. Indeed, Free Joseon's activity declined substantially in the years following the raid. Greitens argues, as a result, that notwithstanding the embassy attack, "there appears to be little potential for sustained armed diasporic resistance".

=== Spanish investigation ===
Neither the embassy nor any of the affected staff made an official report or complaint to the Spanish police. Nevertheless the Guardia Civil and the CNI carried out parallel, "highly secret" investigations into attack, each focusing on different theories.

The attack's "perfectly coordinated" military precision suggested that the attack was not common criminality, but rather professional political espionage. Investigators believed that the participants knew precisely what they were looking for before they attacked.

Police visited the South Korean embassy to see if any of the staff could be identified. A few days later, the South Korean Ambassador Chun Hong-jo wrote to El Mundo denying his government's involvement in the affair. A spokeswoman for the South Korean embassy stated that "we do not know anything, we can not say anything else, we heard about the assault by the press, the police did not come here".

This operation has exposed a group which was once in the shadows and put it firmly in a legal spotlight where it may not want to be.

— Laura Bicker

On 26 March, Judge José de la Mata lifted the injunction suppressing public knowledge of the case because the group had by then publicly "identified themselves as members of a human rights movement seeking to liberate North Korea" and acted without state assistance. The identities and nationalities of the Free Joseon members were called "particularly sensitive" appearing to be US involvement with an invasion of extraterritorial immunity. Judge de la Mata issued international arrest warrants for Hong Chang and Sam Ryu in March 2019, and stated that he would be formally requesting their extradition when they were served. NBC News said it was unclear whether the Spanish authority's own investigation had revealed the identities of those involved or whether the US had passed them the information. Another member of the group was Woo Ran Lee from South Korea.

Lee Wolosky, the lawyer representing Free Joseon, disputed the legitimacy of the judge's conclusions, saying he had reached them without any evidence from the accused themselves. He also accused de la Mata of irresponsibility in releasing the names of individuals engaged in "opposition to a brutal regime that routinely and summarily executes its enemies". The group also denied weapons or violence had been used in the incident. Free Joseon subsequently stated on their website they had "received a request for help from comrades in a certain Western country" that involved "a highly dangerous situation". (Note: The group also stated that an explanatory statement would be published, but, according to Reuters, "no details of any operation have been released" as of 15 March 2019.) On 27 March 2019, they accepted responsibility for the incident in question, claimed responsibility for a graffiti attack on the DPRK embassy in Kuala Lumpur early the following month and warned of a "spectacular" in the near future, saying, "the Kim Jong-un regime will continue to feel humiliated if it rejects the order of freedom".

According to investigative journalist Suki Kim, who had been investigating Free Joseon for over a year, the group has been at odds with intelligence agencies such as the CIA, which intervened against Cheollima Civil Defense's efforts to protect Kim Han Sol and escort him to safety following the assassination of his father in 2017. Likewise, the South Korean intelligence services would likely oppose a group such as Free Joseon given the South Korean government's non-recognition of North Korean sovereignty in its constitution. The group's statement later reiterated that they had acted without state assistance.

=== Interaction with the FBI and arrests ===
Free Joseon subsequently announced they had "shared information of enormous potential value under mutually agreed terms of confidentiality" with the FBI, handing over everything they had taken from the embassy, including audiovisual material. The statement also denied anyone had been beaten or gagged. The FBI refused to deny or confirm the existence of the material or whether it was part of an investigation, although they emphasised the "good, working relationship" the Bureau enjoys with its Spanish counterpart. US news sources reported that the information received by the FBI from an anonymous ex-intelligence officer was "pretty significant". According to DPRK defector Thae Yong-ho, (Note: Thon-ho was North Korea's ambassador to the Court of St James until he defected to Britain with his family in 2016.) the computer equipment taken by the group could have included decryption software essential for secure communications between Pyongyang and its embassies and missions. Known as the "transformation computer", Thae said that to the DPRK leadership it was "considered more important than human lives" due to the perception that its code was unbreakable.

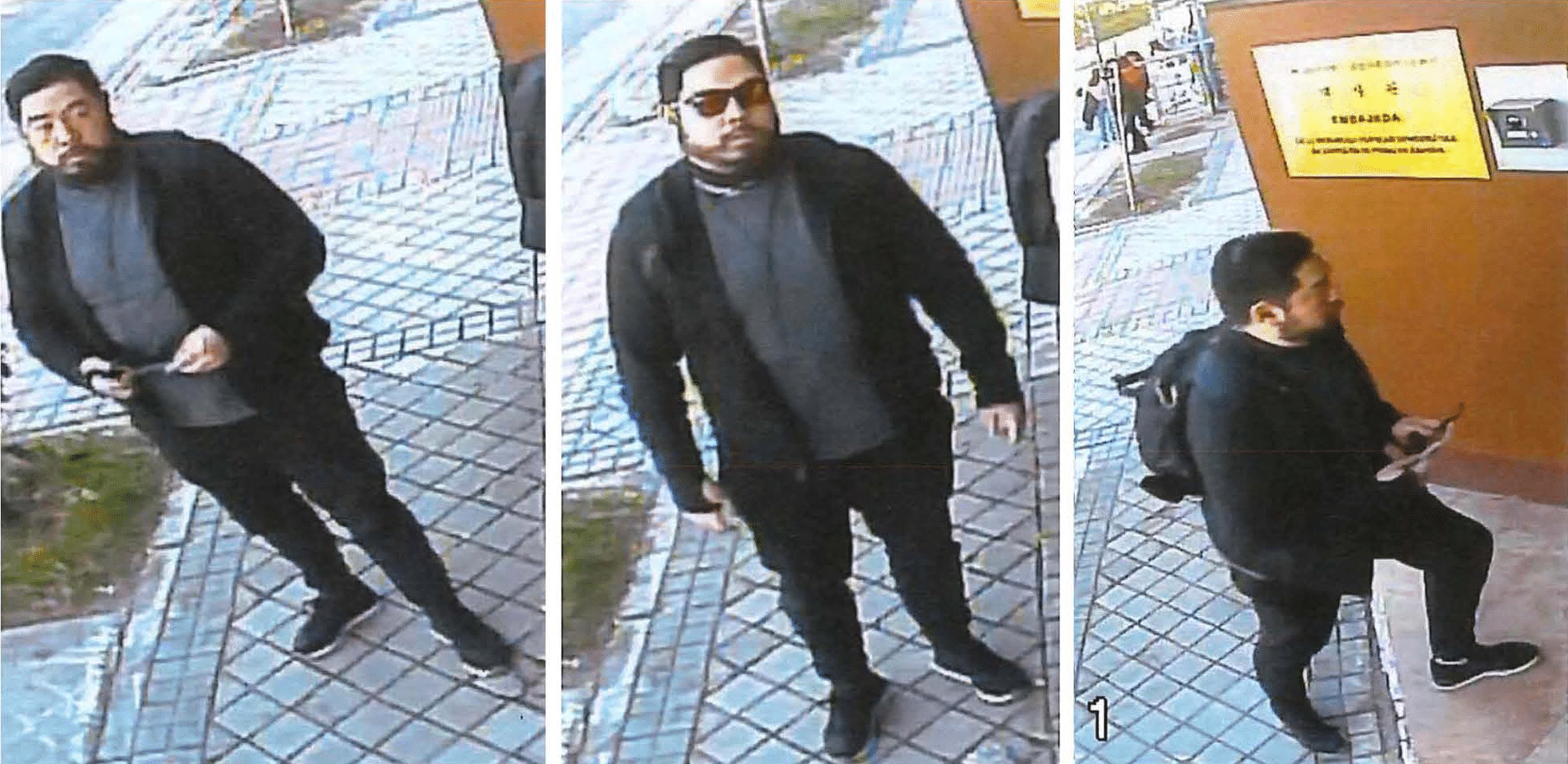
Christopher Ahn entering the embassy before the raid

Despite the group's claims of confidential agreements with the FBI, soon after they handed over the stolen materials, details of the event appeared in the American press, publicly linking the group with the embassy incident. Free Joseon said the media coverage amounted to a "betrayal of trust" and a "breach of confidentiality" by the FBI, which they said had requested their intelligence and had been given it voluntarily. The group said "speculative" press reporting would endanger its members from North Korean retaliation.

Free Joseon failed to gain immunity from prosecution for its members who had been involved in the incident; journalist Laura Bicker notes that Hong Chang is "undoubtedly a wanted man" by the Spanish High Court and probably by Pyongyang. Ahn, also wanted by Spain, was arrested in April 2019 in Los Angeles, but freed on a bail of $1.3 million in July. In a subsequent statement, the Cheollima Civil Defense website stated, "parties seeking to 'out' those in Madrid have painted a target on the backs of those seeking only to protect others ... they have chosen to side with Pyongyang's criminal, totalitarian rulers over their victims". The FBI later returned the items seized in the embassy to the Spanish authorities who in turn returned them to the embassy.

The US authorities issued an arrest warrant for Adrian Hong on 9 April 2019. Christopher Ahn, one of the perpetrators, was arrested on 18 April. In April 2023, on the raid's fourth anniversary, the embassy accused the US of protecting Ahn, which it called "openly protecting and encouraging acts of terrorism against our citizens abroad based on groundless claims". That November, a Hungarian court ordered an unnamed South Korean citizen to be extradited to Spain under a simplified extradition procedure, to which the South Korean government consented. Hong Chang was still a fugitive as of the same date.

On March 31, 2026, Judge Fernando Aenlle-Rocha of the U.S. District Court for the Central District of California issued a ruling granting habeas relief to Christopher Ahn on the basis of his petition for a writ of habeas corpus which had been previously filed in response to the extradition court's reluctant decision to approve his extradition to Spain. On May 11, 2026, Christopher Ahn released a statement on a website intended to coordinate assistance to him and his legal defense in connection with the prosecution over the embassy incident that the U.S. Department of Justice had declined to appeal Judge Aenelle-Rocha's ruling. Ahn was then freed from house arrest.
