= Kim Hyok-chol =

North Korean diplomat

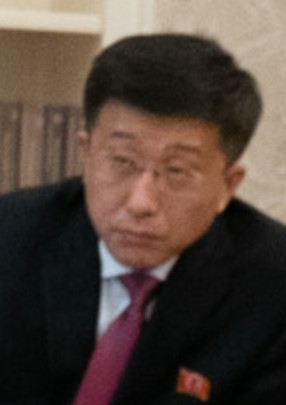
Kim Hyok-chol in 2019

Kim Hyok-chol (Korean: 김혁철, born 1971) is a North Korean diplomat. He was the first North Korean ambassador in Spain from October 2013 until his expulsion in 2017.

== Early life and education ==
Kim was born in Pyongyang and studied French at the Pyongyang University of Foreign Studies.

== Career ==
Kim served as the North Korean ambassador to Ethiopia from 2000 to 2012, as well as the ambassador to South Sudan starting in 2011.

On 1 October 2013, Kim became the first North Korean ambassador in Spain when the country opened an embassy in Madrid. In September 2017, he was expelled after being declared persona non grata by the Ministry of Foreign Affairs. On 22 February 2019, the Madrid embassy was raided by members of the political group Free Joseon prior to the 2019 North Korea–United States Hanoi Summit. Earlier that month, Kim was appointed North Korea's chief nuclear negotiator, replacing foreign affairs minister Choe Son-hui. It was speculated that the raid was an attempt to gather information on Kim, who was the counterpart to American Stephen Biegun in the summit. The summit was abruptly cut short on 28 February with no agreement reached.

In May 2019, South Korean newspaper The Chosun Ilbo claimed that after the failed summit, Kim and four other officials were executed at Mirim Airport in Sadong-guyok, Pyongyang sometime in March. It was also reported Kim Yong-chol and other summit participants had been sent to reeducation camps. The reports were not confirmed by other sources.

In June 2019, North Korean state media published a photo of Kim Yong-chul at a public event with Kim Jong Un and CNN reported, based on multiple sources, that Kim Hyok-chol was alive and in custody.
