= The Chosun Ilbo =

South Korean daily newspaper

- The Chosun Ilbo Building in Gwanghwamun Plaza (2012)
- Type: Daily newspaper
- Format: Broadsheet
- Owner: Chosun Media Group
- Founder: Sin Sogu
- President: Bang Sang-Hun
- Editor: Park Doo-Sik
- Founded: 5 March 1920
- Political alignment: Right-wing; Conservatism (South Korean); Anti-communism; South Korean nationalism; Historical: Far-right (Note: until 1987); Pro-military; Pro-Chinilpa (Note: until 1940, it was forcibly closed from 1940 to 1945.); Pro–Empire of Japan
- Language: Korean
- Headquarters: Jung District, Seoul, South Korea
- Circulation: 5,262,070 news subscribers; 4,000,000+ digital-only; 1,212,208 print; 49,862 print for child
- Website: chosun.com (in Korean) english.chosun.com (in English)

Korean name
- Hangul: 조선일보
- Hanja: 朝鮮日報
- RR: Joseon ilbo
- MR: Chosŏn ilbo

The Chosun Ilbo (Korean: 조선일보, lit. 'Korea Daily Newspaper'), also known as The Chosun Daily, is a Korean-language newspaper of record for South Korea and among the oldest active newspapers in the country. With a daily circulation of more than 1,800,000, The Chosun Ilbo has been audited annually since the Audit Bureau of Circulations was established in 1993. The Chosun Ilbo and its subsidiary company, Digital Chosun, operate the Chosun.com news website, which also publishes news in English, Chinese, and Japanese.

== History ==
The Chosun Ilbo Establishment Union was created in September 1919. The Chosun Ilbo newspaper was founded on 5 March 1920 by Sin Sogu with the financial support of the Daejong Business Association. Cho Jin-Tae, the vice-chairman of the Daejong Business Association was appointed the first President of the newspaper in 1920. However, as the Business Association failed to pay promised finances, the relationship between the Association and The Chosun Ilbo broke down five months after its founding, and Cho Jin-Tae was replaced by Yoo Moon-Hwan on 15 August 1920.

On 6 April 1921, after only a year of publishing, The Chosun Ilbo went on hiatus due to financial troubles.

On 31 July 1940, the newspaper published "Lessons of American Realism", the fourth part of an editorial series. Ten days later – following issue 6,923 – the paper was declared officially discontinued by the Japanese ruling government. In the twenty years since its founding, the paper had been suspended by the Japanese government four times, and its issues confiscated over five hundred times before 1932.

When Korea gained independence in 1945, The Chosun Ilbo resumed publication after a five-year, three-month hiatus.

On 1 March 1999, The Chosun Ilbo announced that starting the following day (2 March 1999), it would be switching to the horizontal left-to-right writing style already adopted by most other newspapers by the time, ahead of the paper's 79th anniversary. It also made a commitment to preserve and continue using hanja characters despite the change. Consequently, the 1 March 1999 issue (Issue No. 24305) became the last issue of The Chosun Ilbo written in the vertical right-to-left style and the last mainstream Korean paper that published in the style. All issues since 2 March 1999 have been in the modern horizontal left-to-right style.

== Subsidiaries ==
Besides the daily newspaper, the company also publishes the Weekly Chosun, the Monthly Chosun, Digital Chosun, Edu-Chosun, and ChosunBiz.

== Controversies ==
The Chosun Ilbo has historically taken a hardline stance against North Korea. For example, it opposed South Korean President Kim Dae-jung's Sunshine Policy, aimed at engaging North Korea through cooperation, mitigating the gap in economic power and restoring lost communication between the two Koreas. For this reason, the newspaper has attracted heavy criticism and threats from the North.

On 6 April 2019, Deutsche Welle described The Chosun Ilbo as "an outlet notorious for its dubious and politically motivated" reporting on North Korea.

On 31 May 2019, the newspaper reported that, based on "an unidentified source", the head diplomat of North Korea's nuclear envoy Kim Hyok-chol, had been executed by a North Korean Government firing squad. However, two days later, on 2 June 2019, the top diplomat was seen at a concert sitting a few seats away from North Korea's leader Kim Jong Un.

The Educational Broadcasting System's popular instructor Choi Tae-seong, sued a Chosun Ilbo reporter for publishing an article that defamed him as a supporter of North Korea.

The Chosun Ilbo has been accused of being "chinilbanminjokhaengwi" (친일반민족행위, 親日反民族行爲, "pro-Japanese anti-ethnic activist"), because of controversy over its advocacy of the Korea under Japanese rule. In 2005, the South Korean government and Korean nationalist civic activists investigated whether Chosun Ilbo 'collaborated' with the Japanese Empire. The Chosun Ilbo published articles described as excessively praising the Imperial House of Japan every year from 1938 to 1940. Until 1987, the newspaper had reported favorably on South Korea's military dictatorships.

In 2002, the prosecution sought a sentence of seven years in prison and a fine of 12 billion won for The Chosun Ilbo chairman Bang Sang-hoon, who was indicted on charges of tax evasion and embezzlement. Chairman Bang was accused of evading 6.2 billion won in gift and corporate taxes, as well as embezzling 4.5 billion won in company funds. He was arrested in August of the previous year but was released on bail and has been on trial since. On 29 June 2006, he was indicted for evading 2.35 billion won in gift taxes by transferring 65,000 shares of The Chosun Ilbo to his son through a nominal trust, and for misusing 2.57 billion won in company funds under the names of family members to increase capital in affiliates like Jogwang Publishing and Sports Chosun. The Supreme Court sentenced Chairman Bang to three years in prison with a four-year suspended sentence and a fine of 2.5 billion won for tax evasion and the misappropriation of company funds.

== Gallery ==
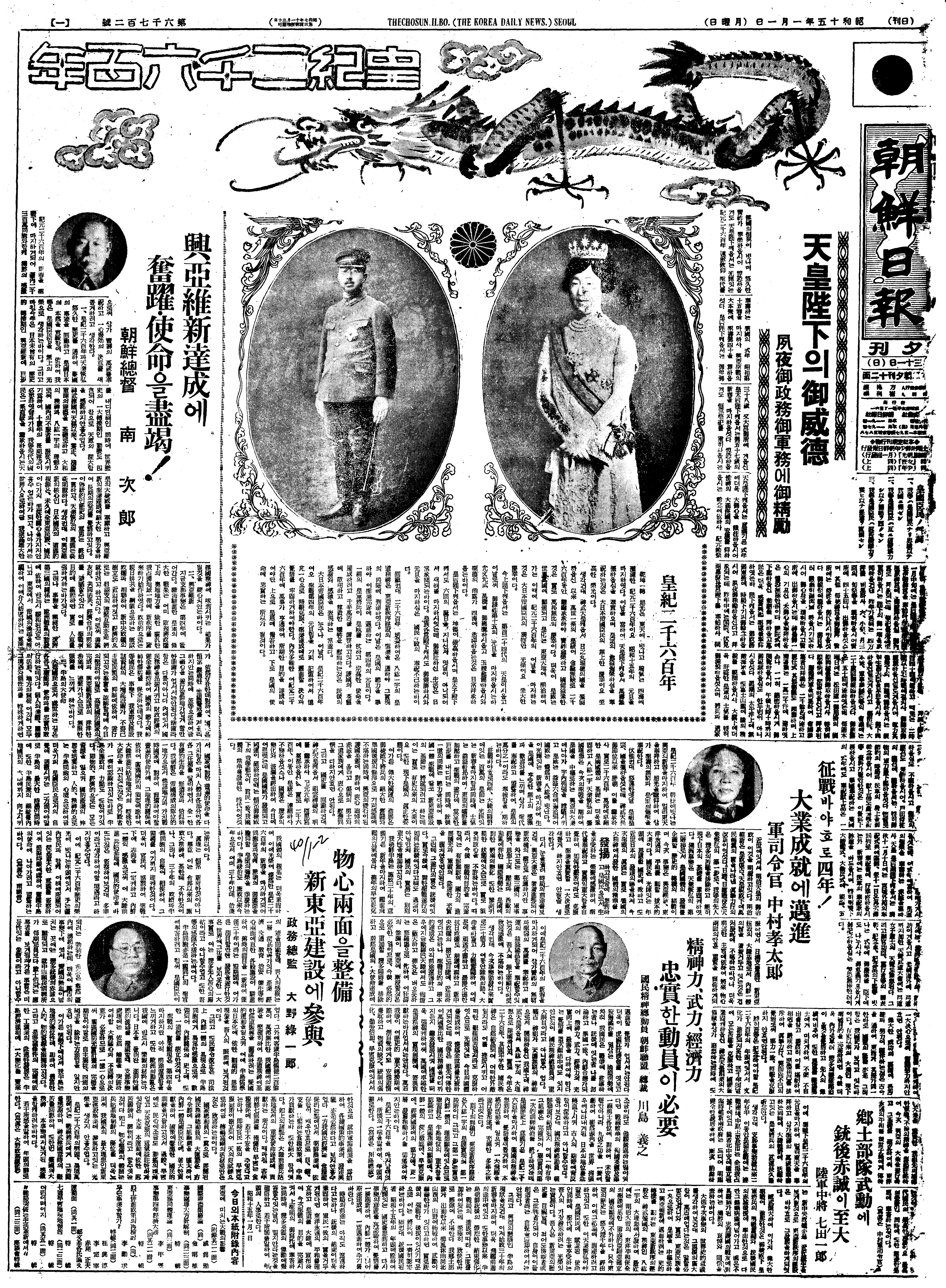
The Chosun Ilbo on 1 January 1940

== See also ==
- Chojoongdong
- List of newspapers in South Korea
- Communications in South Korea
- Issues in reporting on North Korea
- Media of South Korea
