= Liberty in North Korea =

U.S-based nonprofit organization

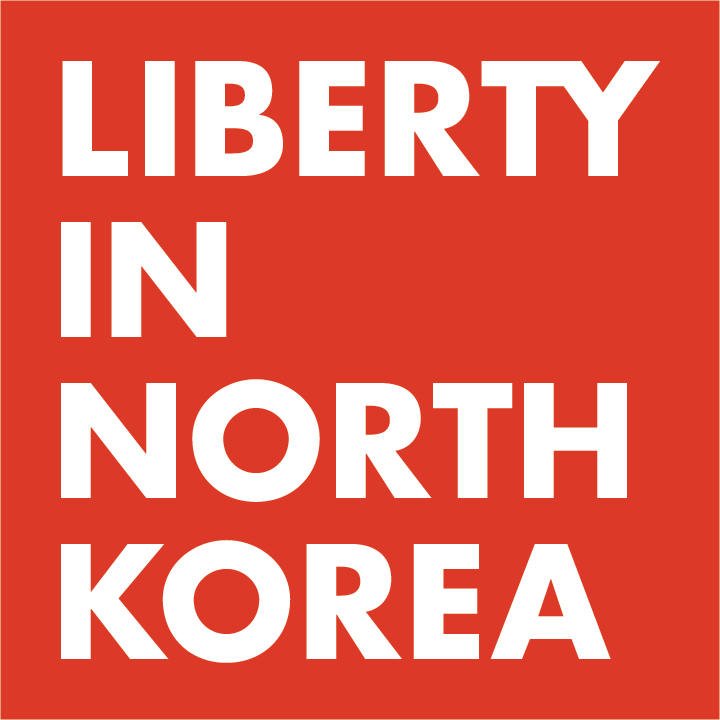
- Founded: 2004
- Type: NGO, 501(c)(3)
- Purpose: Refugee Rescue & Resettlement, Raising Awareness, Research & Strategy
- Location: Long Beach, California, United States
- Origins: Yale University, Washington, D.C.
- Region served: United States, South Korea, Southeast Asia
- Key people: Hannah Song (President/CEO); Justin Wheeler (Vice President); Sokeel Park (Director of Research & Strategy)
- Website: www.libertyinnorthkorea.org

Liberty in North Korea (LiNK) is a 501(c)(3) nonprofit organization registered in Long Beach, California, United States. It maintains an office in Seoul, South Korea. The organization rescues refugees hiding in China and resettles them in South Korea or the United States, so that they can avoid being forcibly repatriated back to North Korea, where they can face harsh punishments. The refugees first travel from China to Southeast Asia through what the organization calls an "Underground Railroad", and then on to South Korea where they are recognized as refugees.

LiNK also seeks to raise awareness of human rights issues in North Korea through media production, conducting research, and through tours. Having sprung out of Korean-American student activism at universities in the United States, the organization grew rapidly and produced several feature-length documentaries, as well as TED talks by its leaders and rescuees. The organization now has a Research & Strategy department based in Seoul, that conducts research on North Korean issues with an emphasis on human rights issues. The organization positions itself as different from governmental positions and media narratives that focus on the dismantling of North Korea's nuclear weapons program and other national security issues, focusing instead on refugees who were considered economic migrants by the Chinese government and who risked repatriation. LiNK provides support to resettlement programs for North Koreans beyond those provided by the South Korean government.

== History ==
=== Early years and leadership ===
Liberty in North Korea was founded at Yale University on March 27, 2004, the last day of the eighteenth annual Korean American Students Conference (KASCON) which described LiNK as "an explosive organization." The co-founders were Adrian Hong and the comedian Paul Kim. The launch included a talk from a North Korean defector and video clips of escape attempts. In December 2004, LiNK sent two teams to the border of China and North Korea to interview North Korean refugees and to investigate conditions.

Led by Adrian Hong, LiNK's name recognition spread through the efforts of Korean-Americans at universities and colleges who registered 40 chapters in a short period of time. Volunteers worked on staging protests, petition drives, and public awareness campaigns. In January 2007, Adrian Hong wrote that "two LiNK field workers and 6 North Korean refugees were caught and imprisoned by Chinese authorities" en route from Shenyang, and that Hong himself had been detained in Beijing. The Wall Street Journal took interest in the case and one of its reporters, Melanie Kirkpatrick, supported LiNK's activities in China in her book Escaping North Korea: The Untold Story of Asia’s Underground Railroad. The organization continued to grow and LiNK's mission expanded to include more field projects; by March 2007, LiNK had 100 chapters in the United States, Canada, Europe, Japan, and Korea. In March 2007, its director Adrian Hong stated that "LiNK has briefed and advocated to the highest levels of governments and agencies around the world," then called for a day of fasting.

In 2007–08, LiNK made changes to its strategy and leadership. In March 2007, LiNK altered its grassroots strategy and shifted to a membership-based model, which led to the disbanding of all chapters that year and a more unified approach to events. In the summer of 2008, Hannah Song took over as executive director, replacing Adrian Hong. Song began talks with Justin Wheeler of The Option, another organization focused on North Korean refugees, and in the fall of 2008 the two groups merged, retaining the structure and name of LiNK. South Korean newspaper Chosun Ilbo reported that "Hong left LiNK when he became convinced that bolder action was required in 2009," and according to a statement made by LiNK, Adrian Hong's involvement with the organization ended around this time. Wheeler was a persuasive advocate for the organization, giving TED talks and other presentations in the early 2010s. Wheeler noted that from 2011, all funding received went to LiNK programs.

=== Move to Los Angeles ===
In 2009, LiNK moved from Washington, D.C., to Los Angeles. The organization also changed its activism strategy from political lobbying to bringing attention to the people of North Korea instead of the politics already frequently reported on. Beginning in the spring of 2009, they also began to send groups of interns to give presentations to schools, colleges, churches and other venues about the North Korean human rights crisis. LiNK has conducted 13 tours as of fall 2014, which occur twice a year on a semester basis.

== Refugee assistance ==
LiNK has focused its work on North Korean refugees in China, who are vulnerable to exploitation and punishment in China, and can be repatriated if caught. If repatriated, North Koreans face reprisal in the forms of interrogation, prison camps, and execution. As a result, LiNK works to rescue North Korean refugees hiding in China and helps them escape through Southeast Asia. As of October 2025, LiNK had rescued over 1,300 refugees and resettled them throughout South Korea and the United States.

According to LiNK, the cost of each rescue is US$3,000. LiNK coordinates a "Resettlement Assistance Program" to help newly resettled refugees. In LiNK's 2024 annual report, $952,761 was allocated towards refugee rescues and resettlement support.

== Raising awareness ==
LiNK works to shift the attention on North Korea away from high politics and towards the North Korean people through a combination of media, tours, and campaigns. They are supported in their efforts by Rescue Teams.

=== Rescue Teams ===
Formerly known as chapters, Rescue Teams are groups formed at universities, colleges, high schools, churches, and other venues that raise funds for refugee rescues through bake sales, concerts, and other fundraising activities.

=== Tours ===
In the past LiNK conducted biannual informational national tours of the United States and Canada. The tours generally lasted eleven weeks and consisted primarily of LiNK Nomads visiting high schools, colleges, churches, and other community locations to screen LiNK media and answer questions about North Korea and LiNK's work.

=== Campaigns ===
LiNK creates and implements campaigns which highlight specific facets of importance regarding North Korea and work to bring under-publicized issues to the attention of the public. The most recent campaign was titled Jangmadang, referring to the Korean word for "market" (Jangmadang) that is used in North Korea to refer to a place where North Koreans gather to buy and sell goods. Past campaigns have included Bridge (2013), SHIFT (2012), The Reliance (2011), and TheHundred (2009).

==== Jangmadang (2014) ====
Jangmadang focused on the markets (Jangmadang) that are proliferating in North Korea to circumvent the government's control of trade. These markets began forming in the late 1990s in response to a severe famine in the country and an inability of the government to provide adequate food supplies. The markets also provide a venue for information dissemination through electronic media, such as DVDs and portable DVD players, USB flash drives, SD cards, portable radios, Chinese cell phones with international calling capabilities, and through word-of-mouth.

The event included videos from North Korean defectors Joo Yang, Yeon-mi Park, and Joseph Kim. The campaign ran during the fall of 2014.

==== Bridge (2013) ====
Bridge focused on rescuing "game-changers" who can build "bridges" of information and money back to North Korea. This campaign focuses on the power an individual has to bring change to North Korea. By helping these refugees, LiNK hoped to spark increased market and information-sharing activity within the country. The initiative's goal was to raise $200,000.

==== SHIFT (2012) ====
SHIFT was focused on changing the public's perception on North Korea from politics to the people. SHIFT encouraged people to tell the stories of the North Korean people themselves and to challenge media moguls to change the way that they are reporting on the North Korean issue. It has since become an integral part of LiNK's focus.

==== The Reliance (2011) ====
The Reliance was a drive to create a human network of people committed to seeing every North Korean refugee free. LiNK used social media to mobilize people across the world to start their own fundraising campaigns online with 100% of proceeds going to rescue missions.

==== TheHundred (2009) ====
TheHundred was started to kick start LiNK's fundraising efforts to begin rescuing refugees. The initial goal was to fund 100 rescue missions, which has since been accomplished.

=== Videos ===
==== Bridge to North Korea (2013) ====
In the fall of 2013, LiNK released "Bridge to North Korea", which discussed the ongoing changes within the country as well as highlighting how refugees are helping to drive those changes even while residing in other countries by sending back money and information to their families.

==== Danny from North Korea (2013) ====
In 2013, LiNK released a documentary titled "Danny From North Korea". It features Danny Lee and focuses on his story of escape from North Korea in March 2005 and resettlement into the United States. It has been used in both their spring and fall tours of 2013, and has been featured in a number of independent film festivals.

==== SHIFT campaign video (2012) ====
In the fall of 2012, LiNK released a short film to support its SHIFT campaign, loosely referred to as "The SHIFT Campaign Video". Supported by an anonymous partner, every view of the video on YouTube raises $0.25 on behalf of LiNK's work.

==== The People's Crisis (2012) ====
In 2012, LiNK released its first independent feature-length documentary titled "The People's Crisis". Rather than seeking to evoke an emotional reaction, the film was purposed to inform the viewer about North Korea as a whole and LiNK's work.

== Summit ==
Liberty in North Korea held its first Summit at Pepperdine University in Malibu, California, in June 2014. North Korean speakers included activists Joseph Kim, Joo Yang, Yeon-mi Park and others. The event concluded with a private show from Run River North, David Choi, and Eatyourkimchi.

== Research and strategy ==
LiNK's Research and Strategy department, led by Director of Research and Strategy Sokeel Park, contributes independent research and analysis to the North Korea issue while collaborating with experts around the globe in seeking an end to the North Korea crisis. Park is an academic with degrees from the London School of Economics and experience working at the United Nations. He regularly is quoted in major newspapers and on major broadcasts. His Research and Strategy team produces a weekly summary of North Korea-related news, which serves as an aggregate regarding North Korea's internal situation, human rights, economy and food security, refugee issues, international politics and security, and expert analysis and opinion.

=== Theory of change ===
LiNK advocates for a people-centered theory of change and lobbies on behalf of a citizen empowerment model. Their goals include the sharing of illegal media such as foreign DVDs and conveying subversive information fosters dependence on others outside the government. Marketization is another area of emphasis for change, recognizing that corruption among officials at local levels both eases access to foreign media and drives black market activity that erodes people's dependence on the regime. Cross-border trade and attendant ideological erosion are also areas which the organization sees as essential to change in North Korea.

== Partnerships ==
LiNK partners with several like-minded organizations to increase its reach. One of these partnerships is with the U.S. Committee for Human Rights in North Korea (HRNK), which has collaborated with LiNK and the Simon Wiesenthal Center to host an event at the Museum of Tolerance titled "North Korea's Political Prisoner Camp System and the Plight of North Korean Refugees: A Call for Action".

== Media attention ==
In May 2008, Google Tech Talk hosted an event with then-Director of LinK, Adrian Hong, and the North Korean refugee and former ambassador for LiNK, Shin Dong-hyuk.

Shin spoke of his time with the organization in his biography, Escape from Camp 14: One Man's Remarkable Odyssey from North Korea to Freedom in the West, written by Blaine Harden. In his book, he criticizes LiNK for excessively controlling his movements and appearances.

Current President/CEO Hannah Song and Director of Research & Strategy Sokeel Park have each been hosted individually by TED. Joseph Kim, one of LiNK's first rescued refugees, also appeared at TED Global in June 2013. In a speech that reached more than one million viewers, he spoke about his life in North Korea during the famine of the 1990s, the family he lost and gained, and the power of hope.

Adding a hard research edge to the more emotional narratives of North Korean escapees, Sokeel Park has been interviewed by major media outlets on topics regarding North Korea, and cited in The Economist. His writings have included "China's better route for North Korean refugees" and "Kim Jong-eun prepares balancing act" for Asia Times Online and "How to Build on Growing NKHR Interest" for Daily NK.

In March 2019, LiNK founder Adrian Hong was identified in Spanish court documents as Adrian Hong Chang, the leader of an assault on the North Korean embassy in Madrid on February 21, 2019. LiNK responded to the controversy around this event with a statement to NK News: "Adrian Hong was a co-founder of Liberty in North Korea as a college student but has had no involvement with the organization for over ten years. We have no knowledge of his recent activities, and we have no information on the Madrid Embassy incident other than what has been published by the media."

LiNK publishes news and analysis via its blog and Facebook page. In addition, financially oriented annual reports are published each year, and this financial data is confirmed by GuideStar, a third-party charity monitoring service.

== See also ==
- Durihana
- Saejowi
- Amnesty International
- Human Rights Watch
- International Coalition to Stop Crimes Against Humanity in North Korea (ICNK)
- U.S. Committee for Human Rights in North Korea
- Cyberactivism in North Korea
