= Adrian Hong =

Korean Mexican activist (born c. 1983)

Adrian Hong Chang
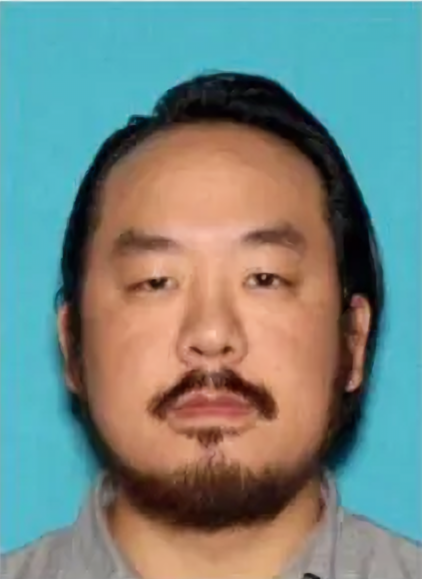
- Hong Chang in 2019
- Born: 1983 or 1984; Tijuana, Baja California, Mexico
- Other names: Mathew Chao; Adrian Hong; Oswaldo Trump
- Citizenship: Mexico - United States
- Education: Yale University
- Organization: Free Joseon
- Known for: Activism for human rights in North Korea
- Website: https://www.freefj.is/who-is-adrian-hong/

Adrian Hong Chang (b. 1983 or 1984 in Tijuana), is a Mexican-American human rights activist of Korean descent. He is known for his leadership of the political group Free Joseon, a self-described North Korean provisional government based in Los Angeles.

Hong serves as managing director of Free Joseon and was previously head of Pegasus Strategies LLC, an advisory firm. His commentary calling attention to North Korean human rights abuses has been published in many American newspapers and magazines, including The Christian Science Monitor. He is a co-founder of the Street Symphony, a classical music group based in Los Angeles.

== Early life and education ==
Hong's father, Joseph, was a Christian missionary and taekwondo champion, who immigrated to Tijuana, Baja California, Mexico. He taught martial arts in Tijuana under the name 'El Tigre'. Hong was born in Tijuana in either 1983 or 1984, making him a Mexican national by birth. In 1991, at the age of seven, he immigrated along with his family to Chula Vista, California.

Hong attended Yale University.

== Co-Founder of Liberty in North Korea ==
Hong was the co-founder and executive director of Liberty in North Korea (LiNK), an international NGO devoted to human rights in North Korea. In May 2006, LINK helped arrange the first asylum to be given to North Korean refugees by the US. In 2009, his work with Liberty in North Korea appears to have ended, according to a statement from that group in 2019. In 2009, Hong was selected as a TED fellow, and was appointed as an Alfred Wolfers Fellow at Yale University.

== Arrest and deportation from China ==
Hong was arrested and deported from China for his efforts to help North Korean refugees living in the country illegally.

== Humanitarian work in Libya and Los Angeles ==
In 2011, he traveled to Libya to "help open the door for the evacuation of tens of thousands of injured civilians and provide them with urgent medical care in Jordan." He also co-founded the group Street Symphony with another TED fellow, Robert Vijay Gupta, in order to bring "live classical music to mentally ill individuals living in deeply impoverished, disenfranchised communities in Los Angeles".

== Awards and recognition ==
In 2012, Hong was the co-recipient of a National Endowment for the Arts grant.

== Involvement in 2019 North Korean embassy in Madrid incident ==
In February 2019, Hong was charged by Spanish authorities along with other perpetrators for invading the North Korean embassy and assaulting the staff during the 2019 North Korean embassy in Madrid incident, during which he used the aliases 'Mathew Chao' and 'Oswaldo Trump'.

Free Joseon and Hong have denied that this was a raid, and assert that its members were invited into the embassy compound by one or more staff members. Rather than a raid, the North Korean embassy incident was reportedly an attempted defection made to appear as a kidnapping to protect the defectors' family members in North Korea.

== See also ==
- Human rights in North Korea
- Phillip Buck
- TED Fellows
- Ahn Changho

== Bibliography ==
- Hope, Bradley (2022). The Rebel and the Kingdom: The True Story of the Secret Mission to Overthrow the North Korean Regime. Crown. ISBN 9780593240656.
