= Free Joseon =

Korean political group

- The Provisional Government of Free Joseon
- 자유조선
- Logo of Free Joseon
- Formation: 4 March 2017; 9 years ago
- Website: www.cheollimacivildefense.org
- Formerly called: Cheollima Civil Defense

Free Joseon (Korean: 자유조선), formerly known as Cheollima Civil Defense (Korean: 천리마민방위) and formally styled as The Provisional Government of Free Joseon (Korean: 자유조선임시정부), is an anti-North Korea activist group established on 4 March 2017. It has been noted for protecting the family of Kim Jong Nam (including Kim Han Sol) following his assassination in Malaysia. It is also known to support North Korean defectors. On 1 March 2019, "Cheollima Civil Defense" was renamed to "Free Joseon", which is also the proposed name for North Korea if it "overthrows its current government".

== Mission ==
On March 1, 2019, Free Joseon issued the "Declaration for a Free Joseon". Within this declaration, Free Joseon enumerated nine accusations against the Kim regime in North Korea. These ranged from accusations of torture and terrorism to failures to provide food for the people of North Korea. By virtue of these accusations, Free Joseon declared the Kim regime an illegitimate government and proclaimed itself to be the true representative government of the people of North Korea: "We declare on this day the establishment of Free Joseon, a provisional government preparing the foundations for a future nation built upon respect for principles of human rights and humanitarianism, holding sacred a manifest dignity for every woman, man, and child. We declare this entity the sole legitimate representative of the Korean people of the north." The declaration continues on by calling upon resistance to the Kim regime of those who currently live under its rule and for Koreans abroad to lend their support to Free Joseon.

== Activities ==
On 15 March 2019, The Washington Post reported that Free Joseon was involved in the 22 February incident at North Korea's embassy in Madrid. Spanish media claimed 2 participants in the raid were linked to the CIA.

The group's activities have included numerous defections of North Koreans escaping the country and their embassies abroad. These include the former North Korean ambassador to Italy, Jo Song-gil. It is also reported that the incident at the North Korean embassy in Madrid in 2019 may have been a botched defection effort disguised as a staged kidnapping, rather than an alleged raid.

On 18 April 2019, the United States Department of Justice arrested Free Joseon member Christopher Ahn and raided the apartment of member Adrian Hong.

On 30 June 2019, Free Joseon released a statement on the 2019 Koreas–United States DMZ Summit, in which United States President Donald Trump met with Kim Jong-un and symbolically stepped across the border into North Korea at the Korean Demilitarized Zone. The statement was critical of the true intent of the North Korean regime in reopening dialogue with the United States on the issue of denuclearisation, stating "Millions starved to death, hundreds of thousands of citizens in concentration camps, and hundreds of foreigners kidnapped and assassinated will attest that, unfortunately, the regime in Pyongyang has never acted in good faith and only seeks to stall while it continues to proliferate weapons of mass destruction and commit mass atrocities. Regretfully, these empty gestures by the Kim regime serve only to deceive the world and empower an immoral criminal regime".

== See also ==
- Provisional Government of the Republic of Korea
- Righteous army
- Fighters for a Free North Korea
- Free North Korea Radio
- North Korean People's Liberation Front
- Human rights in North Korea
